= Bayard Dodge =

American scholar of Islam (1888–1972)

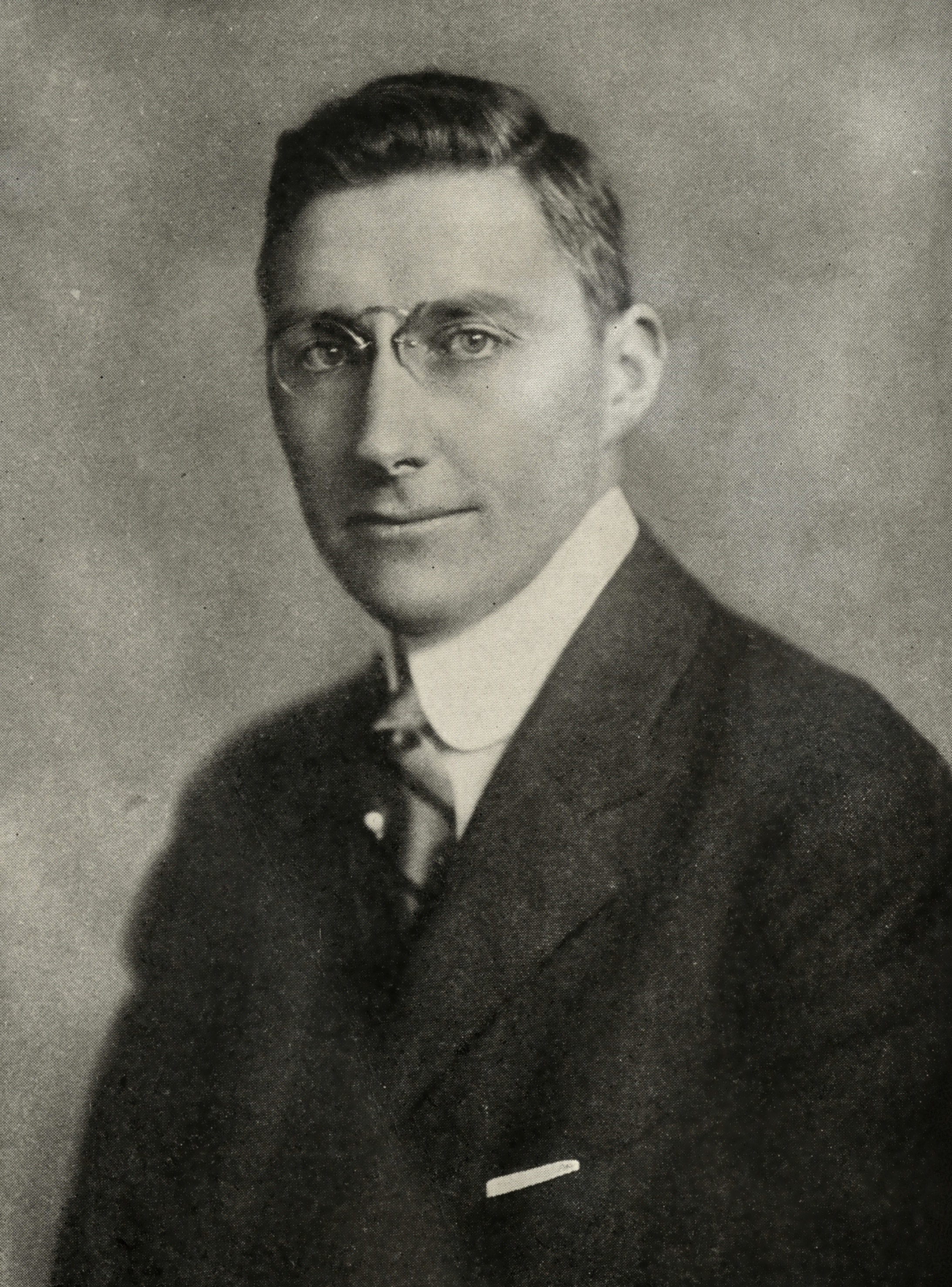
- Bayard Dodge in 1923, during his inauguration as the president of the American University of Beirut
- Born: 1888
- Died: 1972 (aged 83–84)
- Parent(s): Cleveland Hoadley Dodge; Grace Wainwright Parish

Bayard Dodge (February 5, 1888 in New York City –1972) was an American scholar of Islam and president of the American University in Beirut.

== Background ==
The son of Cleveland Hoadley Dodge and Grace Wainwright Parish, he graduated from Princeton University in 1909.

== Career ==
In 1923 Dodge succeed his father-in-law, Howard Bliss, to become the president of a university in Beirut then known as the Syrian Protestant College. His great uncle, Reverend David Stuart Dodge, had been one of the first professors to teach at the faculty in the 1860s. Dorothy Rowntree, the first woman engineering graduate from the University of Glasgow, worked as Bayard Dodge's personal assistant at the university in Beirut.

After his retirement from the presidency in 1948 he continued teaching at several universities. His son, David S. Dodge, later served the same role.

== Works ==
- The American University of Beirut: A Brief History of the University and the Lands Which It Serves, Beirut, Khayat's, 1958
- Aspects of the Fatimid Philosophy, The Muslim World, L, No.3 (Jul, 1960)
- Al-Azhar Mosque: A Millennium of Muslim Learning. Washington, Middle East Institute (1961) – a comprehensive history of the world famous university mosque of Cairo.
- The Fatimid Hierarchy and Exegesis, The Muslim World, L, No.2 (Apr, 1960), pp. 130–41
- The Fatimid Legal Code, ibid., L, No.1 (Jan 1960), pp. 30–38
- Al-Isma'iliyah and the Origin of the Fatimids, ibid, XLIX, No.4 (Oct 1959), pp. 295–305
- Muslim Education in Medieval Times, Washington, Middle East Institute, 1962
- The Sabians of Harran in Sarruf, ed., American University of Beirut Festival Book: Festschrift, pp. 60–85.
- The Fihrist of al-Nadīm: A Tenth-Century Survey of Islamic Culture. An English translation of the 10th-century Arabic encyclopedia by the Baghdadī bibliophile, Ibn Ishāq al-Nadīm.

Family Tree of Bayard Dodge

David Low Dodge (1774–1852)	Married; 1798	Sarah Cleveland (1780–1862)	Anson Green Phelps (1781–1853)	Married; 1806	Olivia Egleston (1784–1859)
William Earl Dodge (1805–1883)	Married; 1828	Melissa Phelps (1809–1903)
William E. Dodge, Jr. (1832–1903) m.1854 Sarah Hoadley (1832–1909)	Anson Greene Phelps Dodge (1834–1918) m(1).1859 Rebecca Grew (1836–1927) m(2).1886 Rachel Rose Voorhees (1852–1910)	Reverend David Stuart Dodge (1836–1921) m(1).1860 Ellen Ada Phelps (1838–1880) m(2).1885 Elizabeth Scott Boyd (1846–1888)	Charles Cleveland Dodge (1841–1910) m.1863 Maria Theresa; Bradhurst Schieffelin (1840–1910)	Norman White Dodge (1846–1907) m(1).1869 Grace Gillette (1848–1870) m(2).1880 Emma Hartley (1849–1881)	George Eglestone; Dodge (1849–1904) m.1874 May Cossitt (1853–1911)	Arthur Murray Dodge (1852–1896) m.1875 Josephine Jewell (1855–1928)
Grace Hoadley Dodge (1856–1914)	William Earl Dodge III (1858–1886) m.1879 Emmeline Harriman	Cleveland Hoadley Dodge (1860–1926) m.1883 Grace Parish (1858–1949)	Mary Melissa Hoadley Dodge (1861–1934)	Alice Clinton Hoadley Dodge (1865–1948) m.1886 William Church Osborn (1861–1951)	Morris Jesup Dodge (1867–1875)
Elizabeth Wainwright Dodge (1884–1976) m(1).1916 George Herbert Huntington (1878–1953) m(2).1956 Rev. Dr. Dumont Clark (1884–1960)	Julia Parish Dodge (1886–1965) m.1911 James Childs Rea (1882–1973)	Cleveland Earl Dodge (1888–1982) m.1919 Pauline Morgan (1893–1971)	Bayard Dodge (1888–1972) m.1914 Mary Bliss (1890–1982)

== See also ==
- William E. Dodge
- William E. Dodge Jr.
- Cleveland Hoadley Dodge
- David S. Dodge
