= Grace Hoadley Dodge =

American philanthropist (1856–1914)

- Born: May 21, 1856; Manhattan, New York, U.S.
- Died: December 27, 1914 (aged 58); Manhattan, New York, U.S.
- Education: Miss Porter's School
- Known for: Philanthropy
- Parent(s): William E. Dodge Jr. Sarah Tappan Hoadley Dodge
- Relatives: Cleveland H. Dodge (brother); Mary M. H. Dodge (sister); William E. Dodge (grandfather); David Hoadley (grandfather)

Grace Hoadley Dodge (May 21, 1856 – December 27, 1914) was an American philanthropist who was the first woman appointed a member of the New York Board of Education.

== Early life ==
Grace was born in Manhattan on May 21, 1856, the eldest of six children born to Sarah Tappan (née Hoadley) Dodge (1832–1909) and William Earl Dodge Jr. (1832–1903), a merchant devoted to religious and philanthropic works. He was known as the "Christian Merchant". Her younger siblings included William Earl Dodge III; Cleveland Hoadley Dodge; Mary Melissa Hoadley Dodge; Alice Clinton Hoadley Dodge (who married William Church Osborn); and Morris Jesup Dodge, who died young.

She was the granddaughter of U.S. Representative from New York William E. Dodge and the great-granddaughter of David Low Dodge. Her grandfather William and her great-grandfather (William's his father-in-law), Anson Greene Phelps, formed the import firm of Phelps Dodge, which was one of the largest copper mining corporations in the United States, and created the family's vast wealth. Her maternal grandfather was David Hoadley, the president of the Panama Railroad, and her great-grandfather was prominent architect David Hoadley.

Grace was mostly educated at home by private tutors, but also spent two years at Miss Porter's School in Farmington, Connecticut between 1872 and 1874. As a young woman, she taught Sunday school at the Madison Square Chapel and, later, at industrial schools for the Children's Aid Society.

== Philanthropy ==
She donated millions of dollars and years of service to philanthropic work. She was instrumental in forming the Kitchen Garden Association, which became the Industrial Education Association. She was the main source of funds, and first treasurer, for the New York College for the Training of Teachers, which became Teachers College, and subsequently a school of Columbia University.

Committed to helping working girls, she organized the first Working Girls Society among a group of silk workers in 1884. According to Dodge, the specific objectives of the Society were to "furnish pleasant rooms where its members can pass the evening; to organize classes for mutual enjoyment and improvement; to collect a circulating library for use of members; and to develop co-operative measures which shall be for the benefit of the members."

On February 16, 1885, eleven of the clubs in New York City united to form the Association of Working Girls' Societies, with Dodge as founder and driving force. She negotiated the merger of two opposing young women's groups into the Young Women's Christian Association (YWCA) of the United States. She also organized the Travelers Aid Society of New York in 1907 to protect female travelers from falling victim to vice, especially the so-called "white slave traffic" (the coercion of white women into prostitution). She had called for the creation of a National Travelers' Aid Society, but died before this could be accomplished.

The Grace Dodge Career and Technical Education High School, named in her honor, was located in the Bronx, New York. It closed its doors in 2015.

== Personal life ==
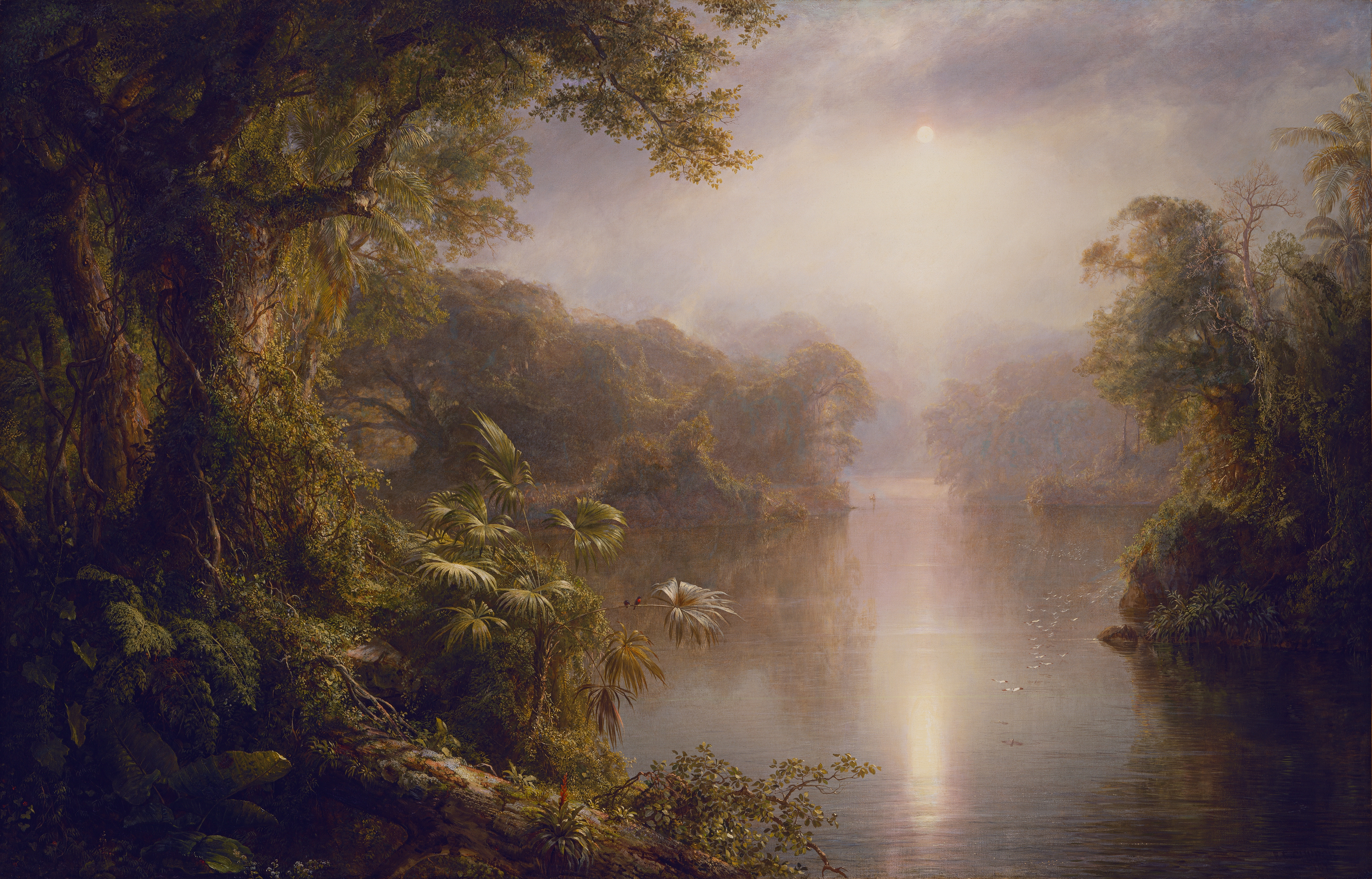
El Rio de Luz, by Frederic Edwin Church.

Grace Hoadley Dodge died at her family home, 262 Madison Avenue in Manhattan, on December 27, 1914, aged 58. She left an estate valued at $6,977,747 of which $1,500,000 was bequeathed directly to religious, charitable, and educational institutions. Among her estate was her home, known as Greystone, and various artworks, including a landscape painting by Homer Dodge Martin, a painting called The River of Light by Frederic Edwin Church (inherited from her father), a landscape with pool and cattle by James McDougal Hart, Valley, Hills, and Stream by Alexander Helwig Wyant, and A Girl with Basket and Pigeons.

=== Legacy ===
A biography of Grace H. Dodge was written by Abbie Graham, copyright 1926.

== Family ==
Family of Grace Hoadley Dodge

David Low Dodge (1774-1852)	Married; 1798	Sarah Cleveland (1780-1862)	Anson Green Phelps (1781-1853)	Married; 1806	Olivia Egleston (1784-1859)
William Earl Dodge (1805-1883)	Married; 1828	Melissa Phelps (1809-1903)
William E. Dodge, Jr. (1832-1903) m.1854 Sarah Hoadley (1832-1909)	Anson Greene Phelps Dodge (1834-1918) m(1).1859 Rebecca Grew (1836-1927) m(2).1886 Rachel Rose Voorhees (1852-1910)	Reverend David Stuart Dodge (1836-1921) m(1).1860 Ellen Ada Phelps (1838-1880) m(2).1885 Elizabeth Scott Boyd (1846-1888)	Charles Cleveland Dodge (1841-1910) m.1863 Maria Theresa; Bradhurst Schieffelin (1840-1910)	Norman White Dodge (1846-1907) m(1).1869 Grace Gillette (1848-1870) m(2).1880 Emma Hartley (1849-1881)	George Eglestone; Dodge (1849-1904) m.1874 May Cossitt (1853-1911)	Arthur Murray Dodge (1852-1896) m.1875 Josephine Jewell (1855-1928)
Grace Hoadley Dodge (1856-1914)	William Earl Dodge III (1858-1886) m.1879 Emmeline Harriman	Cleveland Hoadley Dodge (1860-1926) m.1883 Grace Parish (1858-1949)	Mary Melissa Hoadley Dodge (1861-1934)	Alice Clinton Hoadley Dodge (1865-1948) m.1886 William Church Osborn (1861-1951)	Morris Jesup Dodge (1867-1875)
