= Mary Melissa Hoadley Dodge =

American activist who mostly lived in England

Mary Melissa Hoadley Dodge (August 21, 1861 – December 24, 1934) was an American heiress who moved to England and sponsored many causes during her life, including women's suffrage, theosophy and the arts.

== Move to London ==
She was the daughter of Sarah Tappan Hoadley (August 16, 1832 – January 10, 1909) and William Earl Dodge, Jr. (1832–1903) from New York. The family wealth came from a mercantile business that developed into one of the largest copper mining and copper wire manufacturing companies in America called Phelps, Dodge & Co. Mary was one of six children and she, like her sister Grace Hoadley Dodge (1856–1914), remained unmarried and lived with her parents for several years. To seek some independence, Mary moved to London, England. Her father supported her decision, and purchased a house for her in Brompton Square, where she lived with a female companion from New York named Julia Fairchild Schreiner (1864–1953). (Note: Julia Fairchild Schreiner (1864 – July 27, 1953). In 1914 Julia married English diplomat Sir Robert Hyde Greg (December 24, 1876 – December 3, 1953), who in his lifetime held several diplomatic posts, including that of British Commissioner for the Public Debt in Egypt (1929-1940). Julia died in England. Robert died in Cairo, Egypt, and is buried in the Cairo War Cemetery, Misr Al Qadimah, Cairo Governorate, Egypt.)

Dodge moved from Brompton Square to the more fashionable Eaton Square, and then to Warwick House in the precincts of St James's Palace. She also had a residence named West Side House, located on West Side, Wimbledon Common, in south-west London. She was well-connected in London society, and corresponded with authors, artists and others including Lord Baden-Powell, Henry James and John Singer Sargent. She took pleasure in spending her money on friends, and once took seven guests to the Baltic Sea on board a hired yacht. One of the party, architect Sir Edwin Landseer Lutyens (1869–1944), wrote of the experience:

... Miss Dodge is really a wonderful hostess and we are all such a happy party. We have everything you can think of ... and no one is allowed to pay for anything.

He also remarked that she seemed to tire easily, and that this was the result of an arthritic condition.

Another example of her generosity was when she hired His Majesty's Theatre and paid all production costs for six performances of an opera titled The Wreckers by another friend, composer and author Dame Ethel Smyth (1858-1944).

== Theosophy ==
Dodge gained a new companion at Warwick House, Muriel, Countess De La Warr (1872-1930), daughter of Lord Brassey, who had divorced her husband Gilbert Sackville, 8th Earl De La Warr in 1902. Lady Emily Lutyens (1874-1964), architect Edwin Lutyens' wife and daughter of Robert Bulwer-Lytton, 1st Earl of Lytton, introduced Mary and Muriel to theosophy and to the works of Annie Besant (1847-1933).

Dodge provided financial support for the Theosophical Society and for the construction of its London headquarters (designed by Edwin Lutyens) in Tavistock Square. The building is now BMA House, the headquarters of the British Medical Association.

On May 5, 1911 Besant arrived in London from India with Jiddu Krishnamurti (1895-1986) – identified as their future spiritual leader – and his brother Nitya (1898-1925). (Note: Nitya Krishnamurti (May 30, 1898 – November 13, 1925). His full name was Jiddu Nityananda Krishnamurti, but he was usually referred to as "Nitya" in order to distinguish him from his older brother Jiddu (1895-1986). Nitya had weak lungs, and died of pneumonia and tuberculosis in Ojai, California.) When in England during the period 1911-1919, the Krishnamurti brothers lodged in quite a few different places, including with Mary Dodge at West Side House, and in lodgings provided by Muriel De La Warr in 2 different locations: sometimes Old Lodge in Ashdown Forest, Sussex, and sometimes a flat at No. 2 Robert Street, Adelphi, London.

In 1913, Dodge settled £500 per year for life on Jiddu, and £300 per year on Jiddu's brother, Nitya, during the years Nitya was a student at Oxford University.

== Suffrage ==
Dodge and De La Warr also supported the Suffragette movement and became involved with Sir Francis Meynell. They helped him and George Lansbury purchase the Daily Herald, a bankrupt Labour newspaper. It was relaunched as a socialist daily newspaper and supported the militant suffrage campaign. Later the two women helped Meynell create the Pelican Press.

== Final Years ==
Despite her great wealth, Dodge was hit by the Depression years and had to cut back on her generosity. Her illness also confined her to a wheelchair in later years. She downsized in London and eventually moved to Wick Hall, Hove, on the south coast of England in about 1930, giving up her houses in London and Wimbledon. Esmond Harmsworth, 2nd Viscount Rothermere became the new owner of Warwick House in 1923. Mary Dodge died on Christmas Eve 1934, leaving about $3 million, mainly to family and friends.

== Family ==
Family of Mary Melissa Hoadley Dodge

David Low Dodge (1774-1852)	Married; 1798	Sarah Cleveland (1780-1862)	Anson Green Phelps (1781-1853)	Married; 1806	Olivia Egleston (1784-1859)
William Earl Dodge (1805-1883)	Married; 1828	Melissa Phelps (1809-1903)
William E. Dodge, Jr. (1832-1903) m.1854 Sarah Hoadley (1832-1909)	Anson Greene Phelps Dodge (1834-1918) m(1).1859 Rebecca Grew (1836-1927) m(2).1886 Rachel Rose Voorhees (1852-1910)	Reverend David Stuart Dodge (1836-1921) m(1).1860 Ellen Ada Phelps (1838-1880) m(2).1885 Elizabeth Scott Boyd (1846-1888)	Charles Cleveland Dodge (1841-1910) m.1863 Maria Theresa; Bradhurst Schieffelin (1840-1910)	Norman White Dodge (1846-1907) m(1).1869 Grace Gillette (1848-1870) m(2).1880 Emma Hartley (1849-1881)	George Eglestone; Dodge (1849-1904) m.1874 May Cossitt (1853-1911)	Arthur Murray Dodge (1852-1896) m.1875 Josephine Jewell (1855-1928)
Grace Hoadley Dodge (1856-1914)	William Earl Dodge III (1858-1886) m.1879 Emmeline Harriman	Cleveland Hoadley Dodge (1860-1926) m.1883 Grace Parish (1858-1949)	Mary Melissa Hoadley Dodge (1861-1934)	Alice Clinton Hoadley Dodge (1865-1948) m.1886 William Church Osborn (1861-1951)	Morris Jesup Dodge (1867-1875)
