= David Dodge =

David Dodge may refer to:

- David A. Dodge (born 1943), Canadian economist and Governor of the Bank of Canada from 2001 to 2008
- David Dodge (novelist) (1910–1974), American novelist
- David Low Dodge (1774–1852), American philanthropist, founder of the New York Peace Society
- David S. Dodge (1922–2009), former President of the American University of Beirut
- David Stuart Dodge (1836–1921), professor for English and modern languages
