= Cleveland Hoadley Dodge =

American businessman and philanthropist (1860–1926)

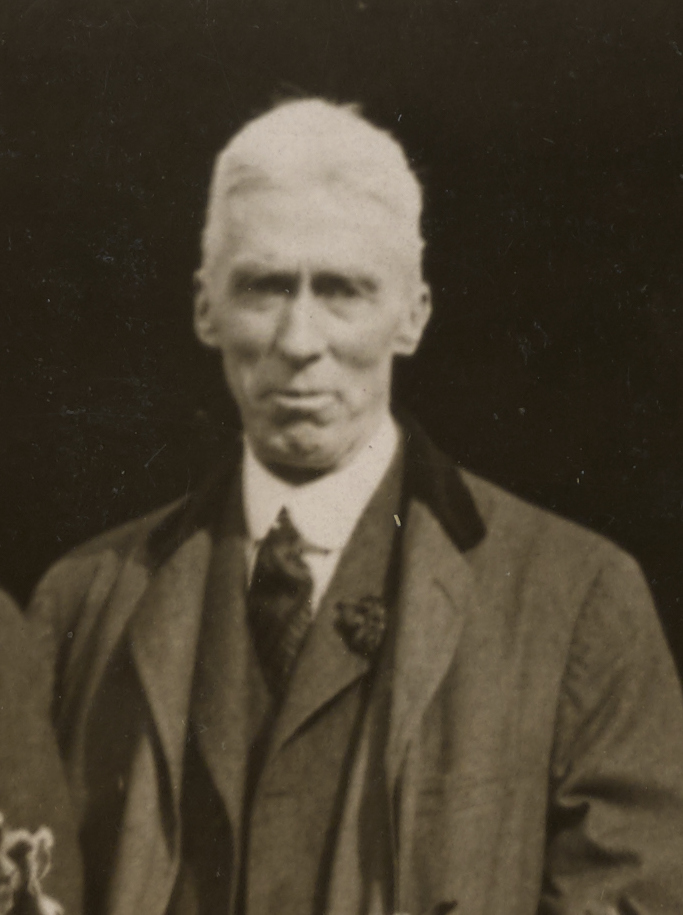
- Dodge in 1918
- Born: January 26, 1860
- Died: June 24, 1926 (aged 66)
- Education: Princeton University
- Occupations: Businessman, investor, philanthropist
- Known for: Charity work in World War I, advisor to Woodrow Wilson
- Board member of: Dawson Fuel Sales Company, Golden Hill Corporation, National City Bank of New York, Old Dominion Company of Maine, Phelps Dodge and the Southern Pacific Railroad
- Spouse: Grace Wainright Parish
- Children: Cleveland E. Dodge, Bayard Dodge, Elizabeth Dodge Huntington
- Parent(s): William Earl Dodge Jr. (1832-August 9, 1903), Sarah Hoadley
- Relatives: Brother, W. Earl Dodge III (d. 1884); sisters, Grace Hoadley Dodge and Mary Melissa Hoadley Dodge

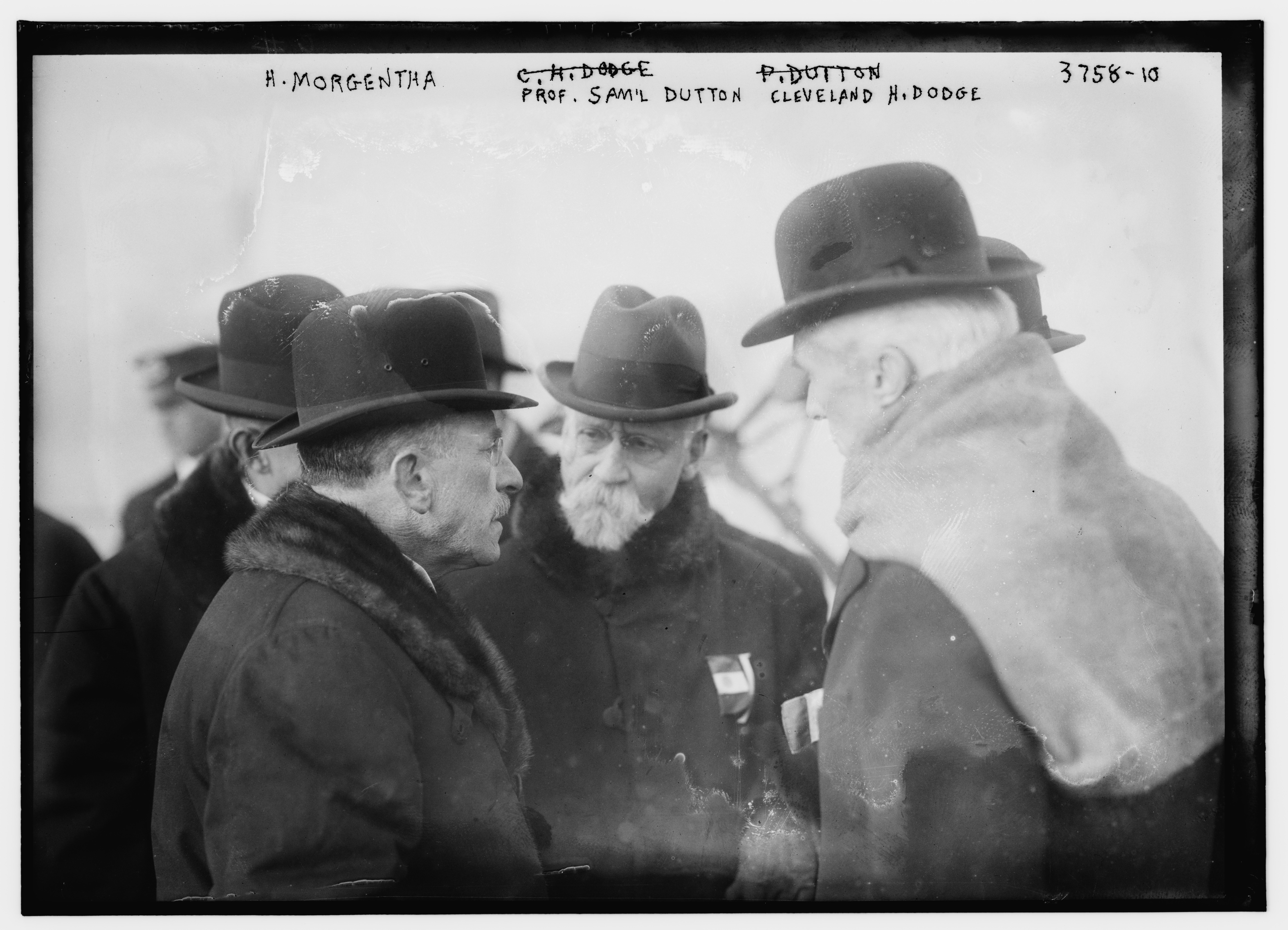
Henry Morgenthau Sr. and Samuel Train Dutton and Cleveland Hoadley Dodge in 1916

Cleveland Hoadley Dodge (January 26, 1860 – June 24, 1926) was an American businessman, investor, and philanthropist. He was active in New York City politics and was president of Phelps Dodge mining and served as "adviser and financier" to Woodrow Wilson. He was known for his charity work in World War I.

== Biography ==
He was born on January 26, 1860, the son of Sarah Hoadley and William E. Dodge Jr., who was a principal partner in the firm of Phelps Dodge & Co. Their family homes were at 262 Madison Avenue, and Greyston, in the Riverdale section of the Bronx. When the Dodge children were young, their playmates included members of the Roosevelt family, one of whom was Theodore Roosevelt.

=== Education ===
Cleveland Dodge and his brother, William Earl Dodge III, attended Williston Seminary at Easthampton, Massachusetts, and in 1875 entered Princeton University, graduating the same year as Woodrow Wilson (1879). After graduation, William joined the family firm of Phelps Dodge while Cleveland entered the lumber business under the direction of his uncle, Arthur Murray Dodge.

=== Marriage ===
Cleveland married Grace Wainwright Parish in 1883; Grace was a friend of Theodore Roosevelt's sister and Cleveland had known her since childhood. Their first child, Elizabeth, was born in August 1884. Two sons, Cleveland and Bayard followed.

=== Business ===
When Cleveland's brother, William, died in September 1884, Cleveland was now the eldest son in the family and was required to take William's place at Phelps Dodge. The company had started as a mercantile business in 1834 but diversified into copper mining, smelting and manufacturing.

The old mercantile side of the business was closed in 1906 and in 1908 Phelps Dodge became a holding company for its mining activities. The officers of the new corporation were James Douglas, Cleveland Hoadley Dodge, Arthur Curtiss James, George Notman and James McLean.

Cleveland was a vice-president from 1909 to 1924 and chairman of the board from 1924 until 1926.

One of Cleveland's two sons, Cleveland Earl Dodge, followed him into the business. His other son, Bayard Dodge, became president of the American University of Beirut (formerly, Syrian Protestant College) in 1923. The Dodge family had long been supporters of the college, and of its founder, Rev. Daniel Bliss. In 1914 Bayard married Mary Bliss, the granddaughter of the founder.

=== Near East Connections ===
Cleveland was also connected with the Robert College in Istanbul, Turkey, where he was the Chairman of the Board of Trustees from 1909 to 1926.

In 1915, the American ambassador in Turkey, Henry Morgenthau Sr., called for urgent humanitarian aid for the Armenian people who were being threatened with annihilation. Cleveland Dodge was asked to help and he met with a group of affluent people who pledged funding. Out of that came the formation of the American Committee for Armenian and Syrian Relief (ACASR) where Cleveland would serve as Treasurer, absorb the administrative expenses as well as offer his boardroom for Executive Committee gatherings.

=== The Woodrow Wilson Connection ===
Government facilities were placed at their disposal and the following year a national fund raising campaign was organised by President Wilson.

Cleveland was a loyal friend to Woodrow Wilson throughout his life. With other influential friends Cleveland managed to get Wilson elected as the President of Princeton in 1902. Cleveland became a trustee of the University in 1904 and supported Wilson's radical reforms. However, by 1907 Wilson was meeting serious resistance to his changes. Within a few years he accepted the Democratic nomination for the governorship of New Jersey.

Wilson next ran for president of the United States in 1912 and was elected. Cleveland was one of the largest financial backers for Wilson's presidential campaign and enlisted contributions from many of his former classmates and sympathetic Princeton trustees. He continued to provide financial support for Wilson throughout his years in office and appears to have asked for only one favor. That was in 1917, when war with Germany seemed inevitable, he asked Wilson to do all in his power to keep the United States from declaring war on Turkey and Bulgaria.

=== Philanthropy ===
In addition to his steadfast work with the American Committee for Armenian and Syrian Relief (which became the Near East Relief Committee (1919)), Cleveland's philanthropic interests included the YMCA, Princeton, American Red Cross, New York Museum of Natural History, the New York Public Library, Metropolitan Museum of Art, the Zoo, Botanical Garden and several colleges in the Near East. During the Spanish–American War he was in charge of the American Red Cross distribution center in New York.

He established the Cleveland H. Dodge Foundation in 1917 with an initial funding of five million dollars, wanting to give money away that came to him during the war years. As well as those large sums, he gave many smaller gifts to individuals with immediate needs.

=== Railroad Ties and Transfer ===
Towards the end of his life he and his second cousin and fellow director, Arthur Curtiss James, were instrumental in bringing about the transfer of the railroad system owned by Dodge Phelps, the El Paso and Southwestern Railroad. It went to the Southern Pacific Company for $64 million.

=== Death ===
Cleveland H. Dodge died on June 24, 1926, in Riverdale, New York, of pneumonia.

== Yachting ==
Cleveland owned a series of yachts starting with a small boat called Kittiwake and then a 46 footer called Wasp. Next came a seventy footer called Hester followed by Corona, a yacht built in 1893 as Colonia to defend the America's Cup although she failed to be selected. She was a very fast vessel and Cleveland, who was a member of the New York Yacht Club, had some success racing her.

== The "Christian Student" ==
Cleveland made a gift to Princeton of a bronze sculpture of his dead brother, W. Earl Dodge, called The Christian Student, which had been commissioned by Cleveland from Daniel Chester French, and showed his brother in sports clothing with books under his arms and academic gown over his shoulder. It became the target of student pranks and these became so bad that the authorities eventually had to remove the sculpture to storage.

== Family tree ==
Family Tree of Cleveland Hoadley Dodge

David Low Dodge (1774-1852)	Married; 1798	Sarah Cleveland (1780-1862)	Anson Green Phelps (1781-1853)	Married; 1806	Olivia Egleston (1784-1859)
William Earl Dodge (1805-1883)	Married; 1828	Melissa Phelps (1809-1903)
William E. Dodge Jr. (1832-1903) m.1854 Sarah Hoadley (1832-1909)	Anson Greene Phelps Dodge (1834-1918) m(1).1859 Rebecca Grew (1836-1927) m(2).1886 Rachel Rose Voorhees (1852-1910)	Reverend David Stuart Dodge (1836-1921) m(1).1860 Ellen Ada Phelps (1838-1880) m(2).1885 Elizabeth Scott Boyd (1846-1888)	Charles Cleveland Dodge (1841-1910) m.1863 Maria Theresa; Bradhurst Schieffelin (1840-1910)	Norman White Dodge (1846-1907) m(1).1869 Grace Gillette (1848-1870) m(2).1880 Emma Hartley (1849-1881)	George Eglestone; Dodge (1849-1904) m.1874 May Cossitt (1853-1911)	Arthur Murray Dodge (1852-1896) m.1875 Josephine Jewell (1855-1928)
Grace Hoadley Dodge (1856-1914)	William Earl Dodge III (1858-1886) m.1879 Emmeline Harriman	Cleveland Hoadley Dodge (1860-1926) m.1883 Grace Parish (1858-1949)	Mary Melissa Hoadley Dodge (1861-1934)	Alice Clinton Hoadley Dodge (1865-1948) m.1886 William Church Osborn (1861-1951)	Morris Jesup Dodge (1867-1875)
Elizabeth Wainwright Dodge (1884-1976) m(1).1916 George Herbert Huntington (1878-1953) m(2).1956 Rev. Dr. Dumont Clark (1884-1960)	Julia Parish Dodge (1886-1965) m.1911 James Childs Rea (1882-1973)	Cleveland Earl Dodge (1888-1982) m.1919 Pauline Morgan (1893-1971)	Bayard Dodge (1888-1972) m.1914 Mary Bliss (1890-1982)

== Legacy ==
- Cleveland H. Dodge Foundation

== Gallery ==
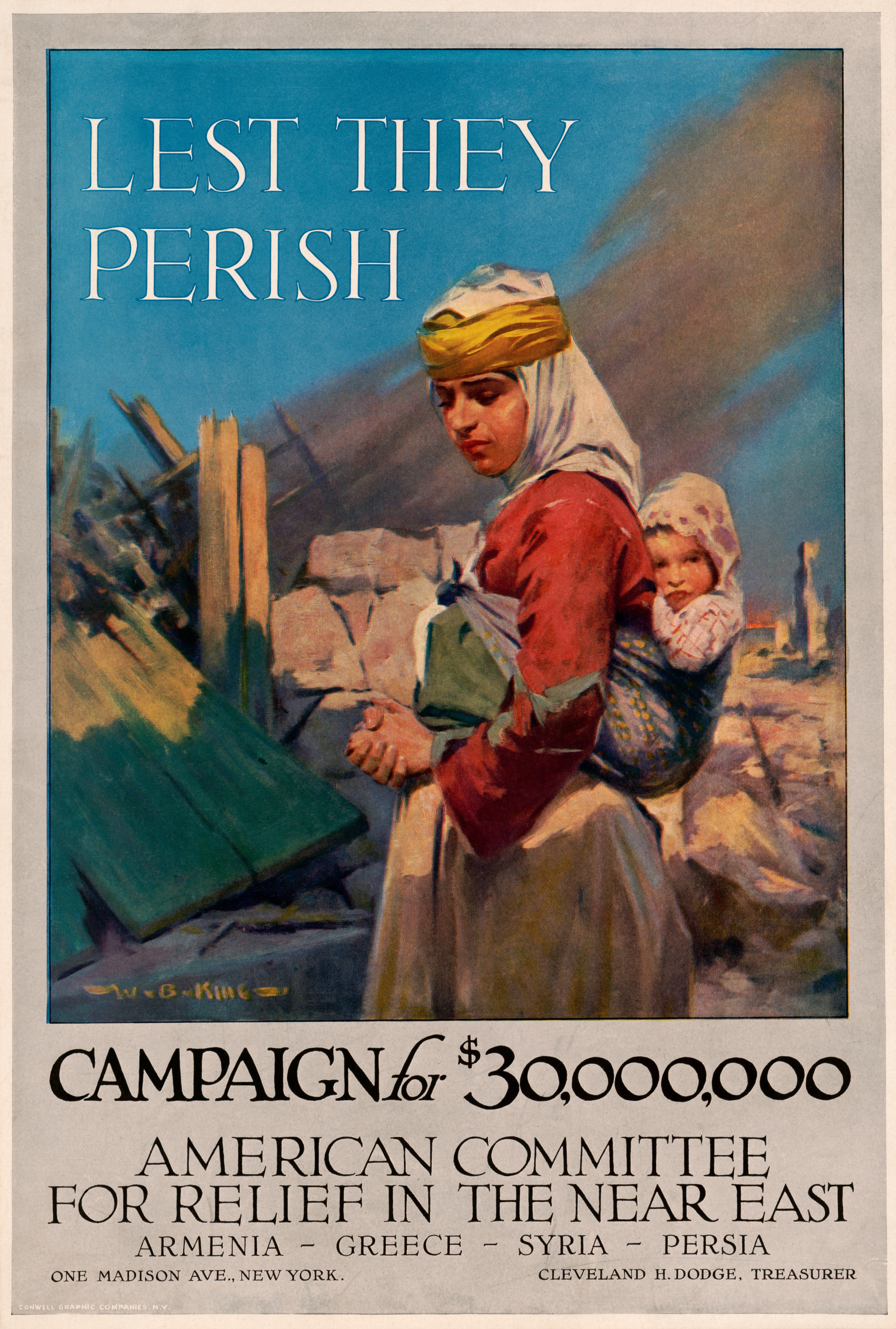

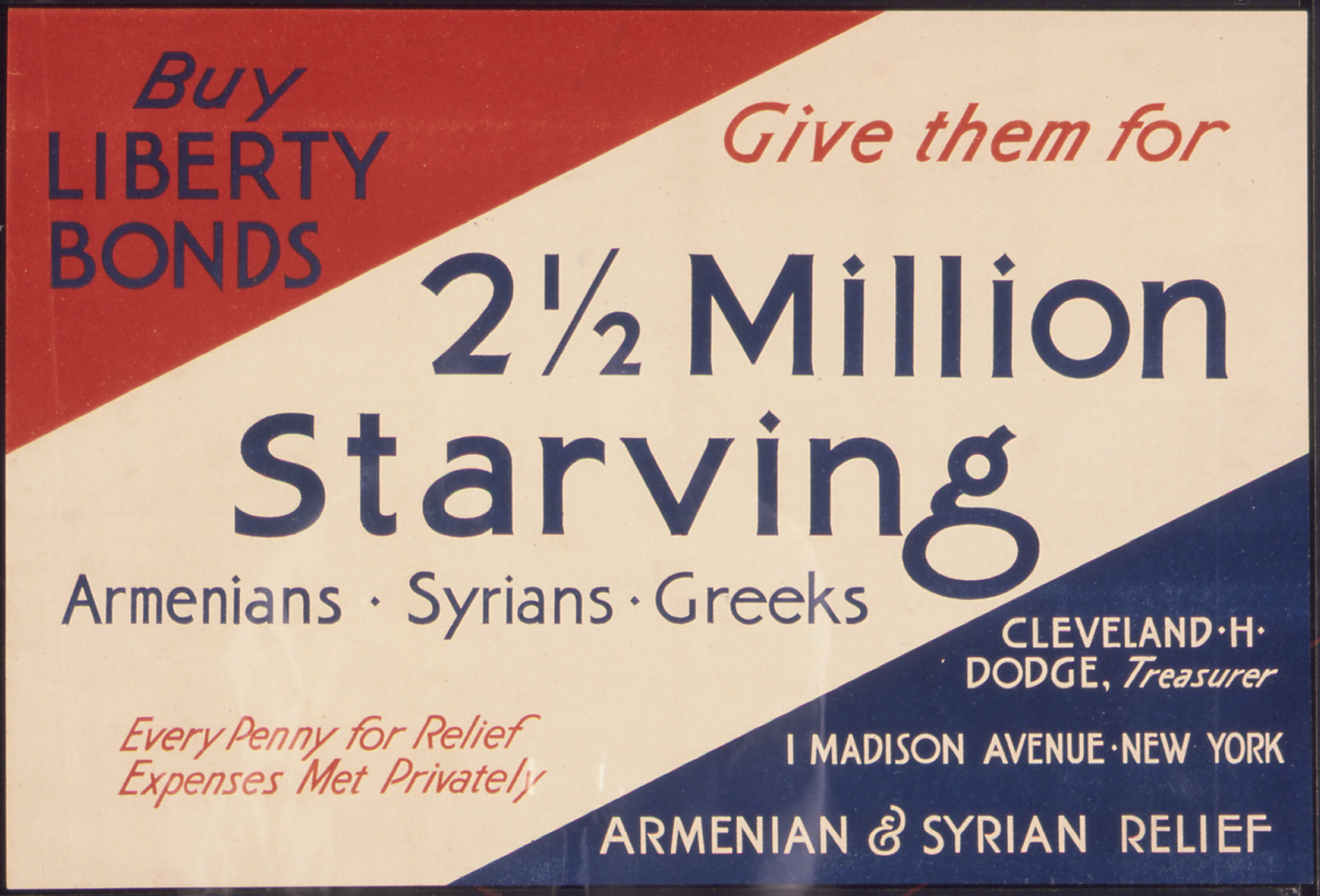

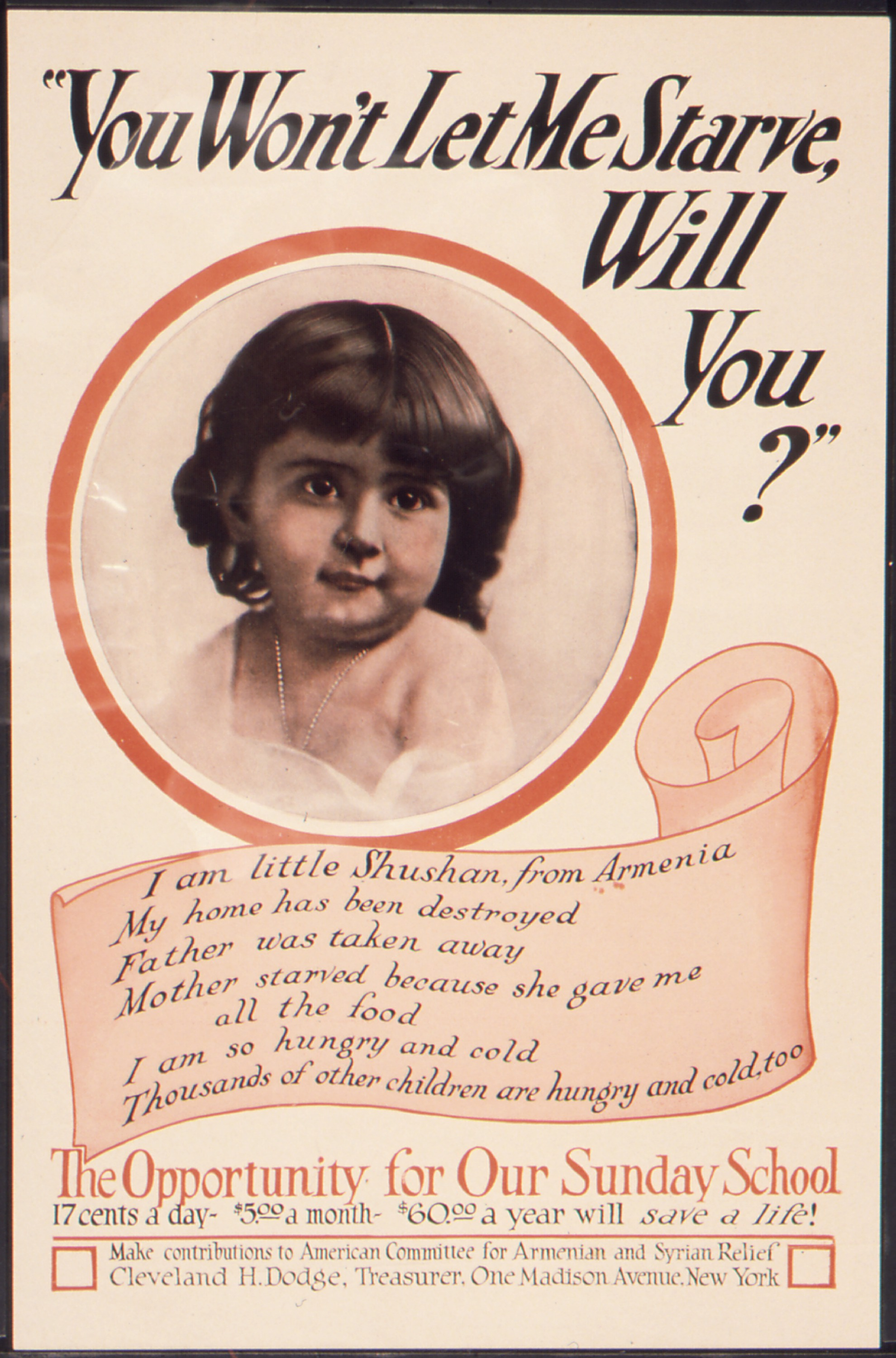

== See also ==
- William E. Dodge
- William E. Dodge Jr.
- Bayard Dodge
- David S. Dodge
