= Mary Dodge =

Mary Dodge may refer to:

- Mary Abigail Dodge (1833–1896), American writer and essayist who wrote under pseudonym Gail Hamilton
- Mary Mapes Dodge (1831–1905), American children's writer and editor, best known for her novel Hans Brinker
- Mary Melissa Hoadley Dodge (1861–1934), American heiress who moved to England
