= Elisha Peck =

Massachusetts born merchant

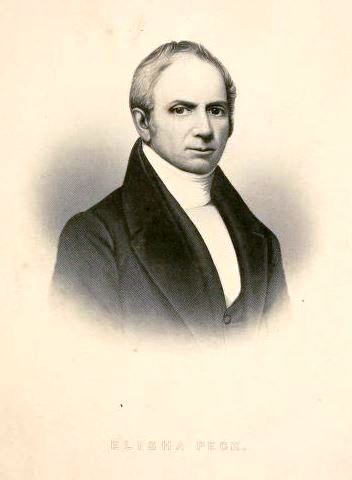
Elisha Peck

Elisha Peck (1789–1851) was a Massachusetts-born merchant who formed a partnership with Anson Green Phelps. He ran the British side of their business from Liverpool for about thirteen years. The partnership ended in 1834 after an accident at their New York warehouse claimed the lives of seven people. Their assets were divided and Peck took ownership of the metal manufacturing plants at Haverstraw, New York. Phelps continued with the mercantile business that he had developed with Peck, forming a new company called Phelps Dodge.

== Early life ==
Peck was born in Lenox, Massachusetts; his parents were Lucretia Pattison and Elisha Peck, whose ancestors had landed in America from Essex, England, in about 1635. Peck left Lenox at an early age and moved to Berlin, Connecticut, becoming involved in business with his uncle, Shubael Pattison, a tinsmith and trader. He also married Pattison's daughter, Chloe, in about 1814.

Shubael Pattison (Note: Spellings of the name vary, often seen as "Patterson".) was the son of Edward Patterson, a tinsmith of Scots/Irish Presbyterian descent, credited with bringing the manufacture of tinware to America. Before this time tinware utensils were normally imported from Britain. In addition to making and selling tinware, Shubael Pattison also ran a general store in Berlin and dealt in furs.

== Partnership with Anson G Phelps ==
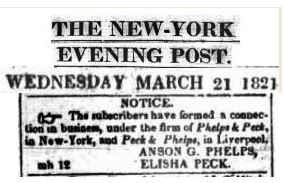
Notice of formation of business

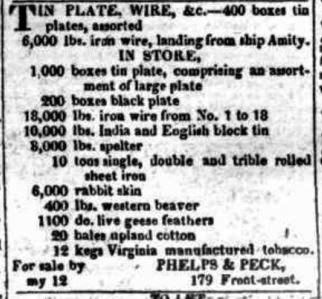
Advertisement for Phelps & Peck; NY Evening Post 1821

Anson Green Phelps was born in 1781 and served an apprenticeship in the saddler's trade in Hartford, Connecticut. He found a market for his leather goods in South Carolina and expanded his business by shipping cotton from there to New York. The cotton was then sold to England and in return Phelps imported manufactured goods for sale in America. He also started to run a small shipping company and moved his business from Hartford to New York, where he formed a partnership in 1821 with Peck. In America the partnership was called Phelps & Peck, located at 179/181 Front Street, and in Britain it was called Peck & Phelps, operating from Liverpool. The company imported metals but also diversified, selling such things as furs, feathers, and tobacco. They distributed goods along the Atlantic seaboard using their coasters, and peddlers took their wares to sell at inland settlements. The opening of the Erie Canal in 1825 and the rapidly expanding West also provided an unlimited market for their manufactured goods. Between 1821 and 1824 their annual average profit was approaching forty thousand dollars.

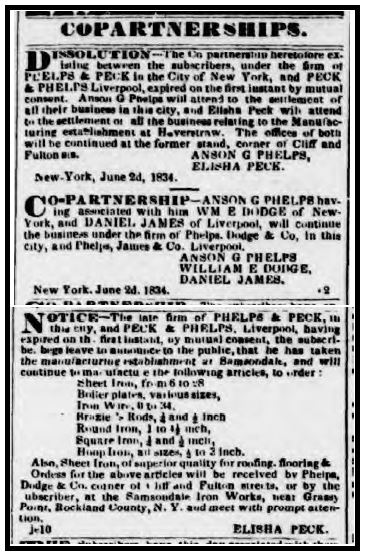
Partnership of Phelps & Peck dissolved 1834

Peck moved to Liverpool, England, with his wife and children in about 1821. At this time, 80% of all cotton exported from America to Britain came into the country via Liverpool, from where it was transported to mills in Manchester and beyond via the canal system. Coastal shipping also delivered manufactured metals to Liverpool, such as tin-plate from Wales, for export to America. By 1830 Peck was almost certainly the largest exporter of tin-plate from Britain, shipping about 51,000 boxes in that year. (Note: A basic box of tin-plate contained 112 sheets, each measuring 14 inches X 20 inches. During much of the 19th century, Wales was the centre of world production for tin-plate.)

== Return to America ==
Anson G. Phelps's daughter, Elizabeth, married Daniel James in 1830 and he was invited by his father-in-law to join the Phelps, Peck company. James was from a farming background and had moved to New York to start business in wholesale groceries, so his knowledge of the metal trades was limited. He and Elizabeth were sent to Liverpool to work for Elisha Phelps, arriving in June 1831 with their new baby. In September of that year Peck left Liverpool with his family on the ship Sampson and returned to America leaving his assistant, Thomas Morris Banks, and the inexperienced Daniel James in charge of the business. James would eventually take over the Liverpool operation, remaining in Britain until his death in 1876. Thomas Banks was his chief clerk and became a partner in about 1838.

== Sampsondale ==
Anson G. Phelps had purchased land at Haverstraw, Rockland County, New York, adjacent to the Minisceongo Creek and Hudson River, with the intention of starting an iron works. Peck obtained the machinery for the rolling mill in Britain and employed Welsh engineer, Rhys Davies, to install and commission the equipment. (Note: Rhys Davies remained in America and engineered the construction of the Tredegar Iron Works in Richmond, Virginia.) The mill opened in about 1833 and Peck named the works Sampsondale in reference to the ship that brought him and his family back to America in 1831. In addition to the rolling mill, other production on the site included the manufacture of screws, wire and chemicals such as sulphuric acid. The New York office for the company was 21 Cliff Street.

== Break-up of the partnership ==
Phelps and Peck opened a new warehouse on the corner of Cliff and Fulton streets, New York, in about 1828. It was a large structure of six stories, with 100 feet frontage in Cliff Street, 75 feet in Fulton. On May 4, 1832 there was a catastrophic structural failure and the building partly collapsed, killing seven employees. Phelps and Peck continued in business together for a short time afterwards, but the formal partnership officially ended in 1834. Phelps restarted with two of his sons-in-law: William E. Dodge in America and Daniel James in Liverpool. The two new businesses were named Phelps Dodge in America and Phelps James in Britain.

The assets of the old business were split and Peck received $175,000 in cash and the iron works at Sampsondale. He operated this with his eldest son Shubael Peck and called his new company E. Peck & Son. Phelps and Peck remained joint owners in some aspects of their old business including the shipping and property interests.

Tragically the 22 year old Shubael was killed in 1837 when a steam boiler on a pleasure craft he had designed exploded. A companion, Henry Beecher, was also killed and Shubael's cousin, John J. Peck, was seriously injured, but survived. (Note: Henry Beecher was the manager of the Sampsondale chemical works) The rolling mill closed some years later due to economic conditions, but was reopened in 1860 under the management of Elisha's son John Peck.

== Other interests ==
Elisha Peck had business interests in railroads including the Somerville & Easton and Elizabeth & Easton Railroads (which became the Central Railroad of New Jersey), the Providence Railroad and the Hudson River Railroad. He also became involved in steam boat connections between Haverstraw and New York.

His brothers, Elijah and Jebez Peck, were owners of mills in Pittsfield, Massachusetts and they operated under the name of J. & E. Peck Manufacturing. Another brother, Oliver, was involved with Lenox Iron Works and later produced window glass with his partner and brother-in-law William Augustus Phelps. Elisha Peck's nephews, John J. Peck and Henry M. Peck, became residents of Haverstraw and they were both involved with the production of bricks. (Note: Haverstraw was renowned for the manufacture of bricks, with the industry employing thousands of people in the area. It became known as "brick making capitol of the World". Henry M. Peck was the son of Jebez Peck and John J. Peck was the son of John Peck, both brothers of Elisha.)

Elisha Peck died in 1851; his wife, Chloe, died in 1844. They had five children: Shubael, Harriet and John who were all born in Berlin, Connecticut, plus Edward and Mary Ann who were both born in England.

Peck built himself a prestigious mansion in Haverstraw in 1833. It remained in the family until 1959 when it was demolished and the site is now a shopping plaza.

== Legacy ==
Peck's association with Anson G. Phelps laid the foundation for the creation of Phelps, Dodge & Co., a business that became the dominant importers of metals into America, and the dominant exporters of tin-plate from Britain for half a century. The company eventually became one of the largest copper mining and copper producing concerns in the world.
