= William E. Dodge Jr. =

American businessman, activist and philanthropist

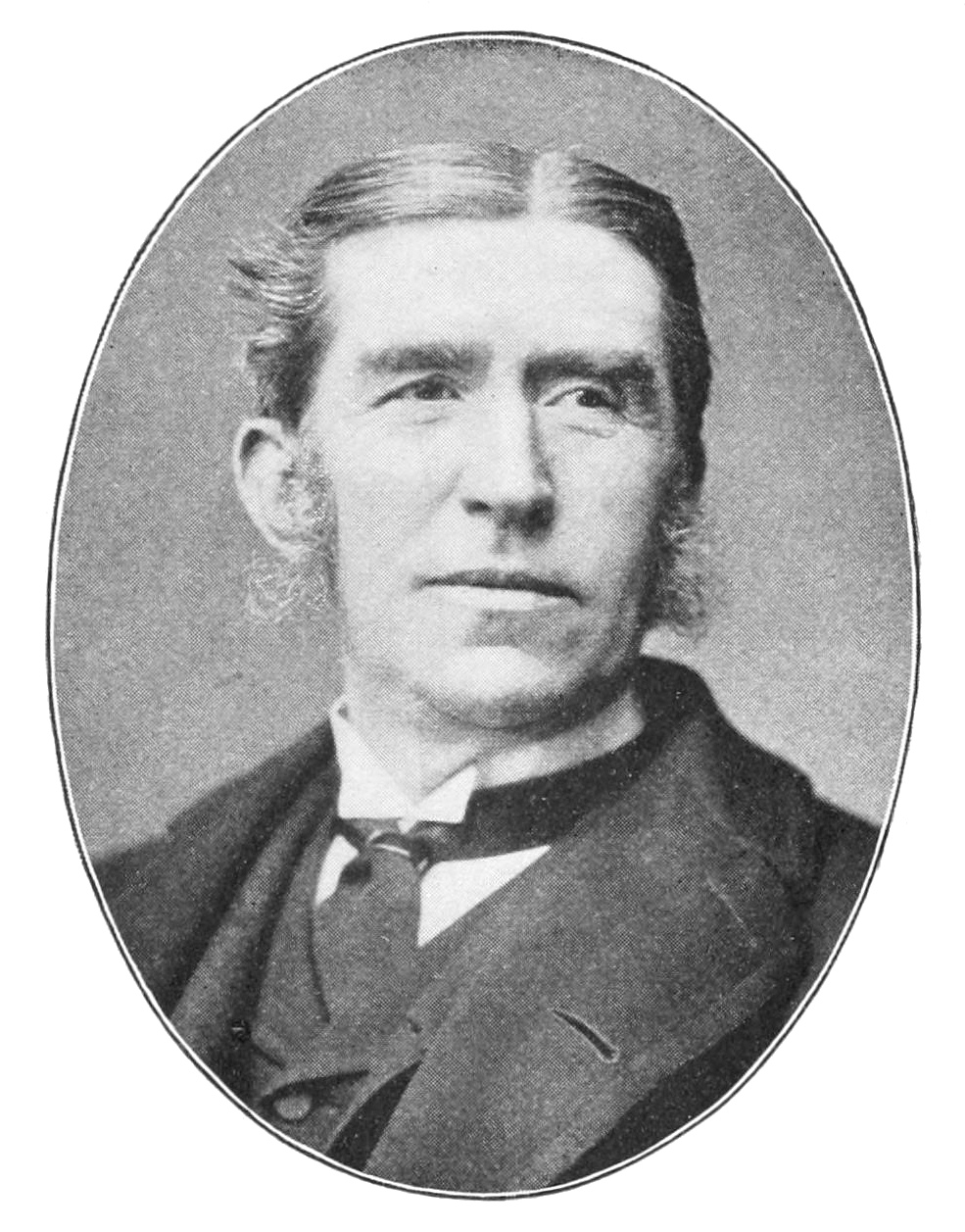
- Born: February 15, 1832; New York City, New York, U.S.
- Died: August 9, 1903 (aged 71); Bar Harbor, Maine, U.S.
- Occupations: Businessman, activist, philanthropist
- Spouse: Sarah Tappan Hoadley (m. 1854)
- Children: Grace Hoadley Dodge; William E. Dodge III; Cleveland Hoadley Dodge; Mary Melissa Hoadley Dodge; Alice Clinton Hoadley Dodge; Morris Jesup Dodge
- Parent(s): William E. Dodge; Melissa Phelps

William Earl Dodge Jr. (February 15, 1832 – August 9, 1903) was an American businessman, activist, and philanthropist. For many years, he was one of two controlling partners in the Phelps Dodge Corporation, one of the largest copper mining corporations in the United States.

== Early life ==
Dodge was born in New York City on February 15, 1832, the eldest son of Melissa (née Phelps) Dodge and William E. Dodge Sr. (1805–1883), a U.S. Representative from New York. His father and maternal grandfather, Anson Greene Phelps, were co-founders of the import firm of Phelps Dodge.

Dodge was very active in his support of the Union cause during the Civil War, becoming a member of the Union League Club and an advisor to the Women's Central Association of Relief. His service on a commission of the State of New York to supervise the conditions of New York State troops in the field led the New York Legislature to pass a resolution honoring him for his work.

== Career ==
He began working for the Phelps Dodge Corporation, and in 1864 was named a partner in the firm. Dodge and his cousin, Daniel Willis James, transformed the Phelps Dodge company from a placid and profitable import business into one of the world's largest and wealthiest mining corporations. The Phelps Dodge company had decided to enter the mining industry, and hired professor of chemistry James Douglas to make an inspection of mining claims in the Southwestern United States. Douglas suggested that the two men invest in the Detroit Copper Mining Company of Arizona, which owned a copper mining claim in Warren, Arizona. In 1881, Phelps Dodge not only took a controlling interest in the Detroit Copper Mining Company but also purchased a minority interest in the adjoining Copper Queen Mine in Bisbee, Arizona. After the Copper Queen and Detroit Copper both struck the Atlanta lode in 1884, Phelps Dodge bought out the remaining interest in the Copper Queen. The company merged its various mining interests into the Copper Queen Consolidated Mining Company in 1885, and installed Douglas as president and part-owner.

With production in the Bisbee expanding, Dodge and his business partners formed the Arizona and South Eastern Railroad (later more widely known as the El Paso and Southwestern Railroad) in 1888. In time, Dodge sat on the board of directors of a number of mining, railroad, real estate, water, and other companies, and Phelps Dodge was on its way to becoming one of the largest mining companies in the world.

Dodge had other interests outside of Phelps Dodge, too. He was a leader of the Ansonia Clock Company, American Brass Company, Atlantic Mutual Insurance Company, Lackawanna Steel Company, Morningside Realty Company, United Globe Mines, and the New York Life Insurance Company. He was vice president of the New York Chamber of Commerce at the time of his death.

=== Philanthropic work ===
A Presbyterian, Dodge was president of the American branch of the Evangelical Alliance and the National Temperance Society (as his father was before him), and vice-president of the American Sunday School Union. He was active in the New York City chapter of the Young Men's Christian Association, and led the efforts to build the chapter's first and second buildings.

He was chairman of the National Arbitration Committee, and helped raise funds for and guide the Metropolitan Museum of Art (he was chairman of the executive committee), the American Museum of Natural History (he was vice-president for a time), and the New York Botanical Garden

He was a member of the Linnean Society, American Historical Association, New York Academy of Sciences, American Fine Arts Society, New York Geographical Society, New-York Historical Society, the New England Society of New York, the Century Association, and the National Academy of Design.

== Personal life ==
In April 1854, Dodge was married to Sarah Tappan Hoadley (1832–1909), daughter of David Hoadley, president of the Panama Railroad Company. Together, the couple had six children:

- Grace Hoadley Dodge (1856–1914), who co-founded Teacher's College and was the first woman to sit on the New York City Board of Education.
- William Earl Dodge III (1858–1886), who married Emmeline Harriman (1859–1938), daughter of Oliver Harriman, in 1879. After his death, she married Stephen Henry Olin.
- Cleveland Hoadley Dodge (1860–1926), who followed his father into the family business and founded the Cleveland H. Dodge Foundation in 1917.
- Mary Melissa Hoadley Dodge (1861–1934), who did not marry.
- Alice Clinton Hoadley Dodge (1865–1948), who married philanthropist William Church Osborn who served as the president of the Metropolitan Museum of Art.
- Morris Jesup Dodge (1867–1875), who died young.

William E. Dodge Jr. died of heart failure on August 9, 1903, at his summer home in Bar Harbor, Maine.

In 1905, Sarah Tappan Hoadley purchased the Willamette Meteorite, and after displaying it at the Lewis and Clark Centennial Exposition, she donated it to the American Museum of Natural History in New York City, where it has been on display since 1906.

=== Residence ===
In 1863, Dodge built a summer retreat known as Greyston, a gambrel-roofed Gothic Revival mansion of granite designed by James Renwick Jr., in Riverdale, Bronx, New York City. With Lyndhurst, Tarrytown, and Ingleside, Dobbs Ferry, it is one of only three mid-nineteenth century survivors along the intensely redeveloped lower Hudson. His Dodge heirs donated it in 1961 as a conference center for Teachers College, Columbia University, who used it until the 1970s, then sold it to Zen Buddhist Community, who sold it again.

== Family tree ==
Family Tree of William Earl Dodge Jr.

David Low Dodge (1774–1852) | Married; 1798 | Sarah Cleveland (1780–1862) | Anson Green Phelps (1781–1853) | Married; 1806 | Olivia Egleston (1784–1859)
William Earl Dodge (1805–1883) | Married; 1828 | Melissa Phelps (1809–1903)
William E. Dodge Jr. (1832–1903) m.1854 Sarah Hoadley (1832–1909) | Anson Greene Phelps Dodge (1834–1918) m(1).1859 Rebecca Grew (1836–1927) m(2).1886 Rachel Rose Voorhees (1852–1910) | David Stuart Dodge (1836–1921) m(1).1860 Ellen Ada Phelps (1838–1880) m(2).1885 Elizabeth Scott Boyd (1846–1888) | Charles Cleveland Dodge (1841–1910) m.1863 Maria Theresa; Bradhurst Schieffelin (1840–1910) | Norman White Dodge (1846–1907) m(1).1869 Grace Gillette (1848–1870) m(2).1880 Emma Hartley (1849–1881) | George Eglestone; Dodge (1849–1904) m.1874 May Cossitt (1853–1911) | Arthur Murray Dodge (1852–1896) m.1875 Josephine Jewell (1855–1928)
Grace Hoadley Dodge (1856–1914) | William Earl Dodge III (1858–1886) m.1879 Emmeline Harriman (1859–1938) | Cleveland Hoadley Dodge (1860–1926) m.1883 Grace Parish (1858–1949) | Mary Melissa Hoadley Dodge (1861–1934) | Alice Clinton Hoadley Dodge (1865–1948) m.1886 William Church Osborn (1861–1951) | Morris Jesup Dodge (1867–1875)
