= National Temperance Society and Publishing House =

National Temperance Society and Publishing Company
- Founded: 1865
- Country of origin: United States

The National Temperance Society and Publishing House was a publishing house which advocated personal alcohol temperance and a governmental ban on the personal consumption of alcohol. It was based in New York City.

== Foundation ==
It was founded in 1865 following a two-day, non-denominational conference of temperance advocates Saratoga Springs, New York. Among its founders were William E. Dodge, Neal Dow and James Black. Dodge was elected president and held the position until his death in 1883.

== Publications ==
During its first 60 years, it published over a billion pages of literature in support of the temperance movement. Its three monthly magazines had a combined circulation of about 600,000. They were The National Temperance Advocate for adults, The Youth's Temperance Banner for adolescents, and The Water Lily for children. The Society also published over 2,000 books and pamphlets in addition to textbooks, posters and flyers.

The group's archive is held by the Presbyterian Historical Society in Philadelphia.

== Notable people ==
- James Black (prohibitionist) (1823-1893), American temperance movement activist and a founder of the Prohibition Party.
- Julia Colman (1828–1909), American temperance educator, activist, editor, writer
- Sara Jane Crafts (1845–1930), educator, author, social reformer
- George Cruikshank (1792-1878), British caricaturist and book illustrator
- William E. Dodge (1805-1883), American businessman, politician and activist who served as the organization's founding president (1865-1883)
- William E. Dodge Jr. (1832-1903), American copper magnate, activist, and philanthropist. He was the son of William E. Dodge
- Neal Dow, (1804-1897), American temperance advocate and politician
- James J. Spelman (1841-1894), American was a journalist and politician in New York and Mississippi
