= David Hoadley (businessman) =

American businessman and executive

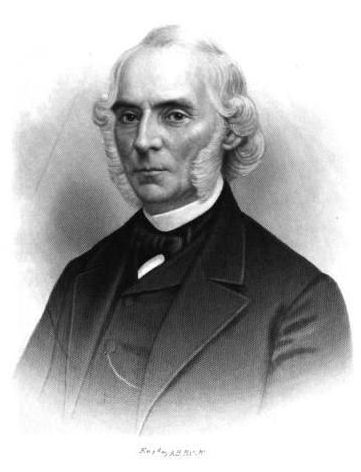
- Born: 13 February 1806; Waterbury, Connecticut, Connecticut, US
- Died: 20 August 1873 (aged 67); Englewood, New Jersey, US
- Occupation: Businessperson
- Spouse(s): Mary Hotchkiss (d. June 9, 1837); Elizabeth Tappen
- Children: First marriage: Mary, Sarah, Russell; Second marriage: Alice, Tappen, Elizabeth, Olivia, Adelaide
- Parent(s): David Hoadley and Rachel Hull Hoadley

David Hoadley (February 13, 1806 – August 20, 1873) was an American businessman, and an executive in the banking and railroad industries. He is best known for taking over the Panama Railway in November 1851 as the company faced bankruptcy while attempting to build a railroad across the Isthmus of Panama. Hoadley was able to stabilize the company as well as complete the railroad a year ahead of schedule.

== Early life ==
Hoadley was born in Waterbury, Connecticut, in 1806. He was a direct descendant of William Hoadley, who had settled Branford, Connecticut, in 1666. He was the eldest son of David and Rachel (Beecher) Hoadley. His father was a carpenter and architect who built several well-known Congregational churches and many fine homes (including the Samuel Wadsworth Russell House) in the area.

Hoadley worked in his future father-in-law's pharmacy in New Haven, Connecticut. In April 1827, he founded his own wholesale drug business in New York City, an enterprise which proved extremely profitable. He married Mary Hotchkiss, daughter of his old employer, on December 23, 1829. The couple had three children: Mary (born November 17, 1830), Sarah (born August 16, 1832), and Russell (born August 19, 1834). On April 5, 1854, Sarah married the wealthy mine owner William E. Dodge, Jr. of Phelps Dodge fame. Mary Hotchkiss Hoadley died June 9, 1837, at the age of 26.

David Hoadley then married Elizabeth Crannel Tappen, daughter of a Danbury, Connecticut, doctor, on June 12, 1838. The couple had three more children: Alice (born July 4, 1839), Tappen (born February 11, 1841), Elizabeth (born June 1, 1844), Olivia (born November 17, 1848), and Adelaide (born February 4, 1855).

Illness forced Hoadley to retired from the wholesale pharmaceutical supply business in 1848. But his health improved the following year, and he was named vice president of the American Exchange Bank (now part of the Bank of New York Mellon Corporation.He proved extremely adept at finance, and his leadership of the bank gained him widespread fame.

== Panama Railroad presidency ==
Hoadley's managerial expertise became so widely regarded that he was named President of the Panama Railway on November 1, 1851. The goal of the Panama Railway was to build a railroad across the Isthmus of Panama, linking the Atlantic and Pacific oceans which would lessen the length of shipping and avoid the Cape of Good Hope for cargo. The railway was chartered on April 18, 1849, and construction began in May 1850. Construction proceeded very slowly due to the poor condition of the soil, the exceedingly hot and humid climate, and numerous tropical diseases (especially malaria). By November 1851, construction had proceeded so slowly that the Panama Railroad Company faced bankruptcy. The chief engineer John Trautwine was forced to resign. Company president C.J. Young also resigned, and David Hoadley was named his successor.

Under Hoadley, the railroad not only survived but thrived. In part, this was due to sheer luck: Three weeks after Hoadley assumed control of the railroad, two steamships with over 1,000 passengers were forced by a storm to put in at Aspinwall (the western terminus of the railroad). The railroad had only just completed construction of its docks at Aspinwall. The ships' passengers demanded to be put ashore and were granted passage aboard the railroad (at outrageously high prices). Although the rail line was only a third complete, the passengers were extremely grateful at being able to cut months from their long sea voyage. When news of the incident reached the United States, Panama Railroad Company shares soared and the company saved from bankruptcy.

Hoadley re-ordered the management of the construction teams, adding thousands of workers and additional equipment as well as the construction of the line from the east to the west (not just west to east). With Hoadley's firm managerial hand, construction of the railroad was finished a year in advance, despite its early troubles. The railway ran its first train on January 28, 1855, making it the first transcontinental railroad in North America. Hoadley chartered a steamship and traveled to Panama for the occasion, where he rode the train to the Pacific Ocean.

== Retirement and death ==
Hoadley retired from the Panama Railroad in 1869.He sold his home in New York City and moved to Englewood, New Jersey, taking up residence in his former summer home. He lived there until his death in 1873.
