= El Rio de Luz =

Painting by Frederic Edwin Church

El Rio de Luz (The River of Light)
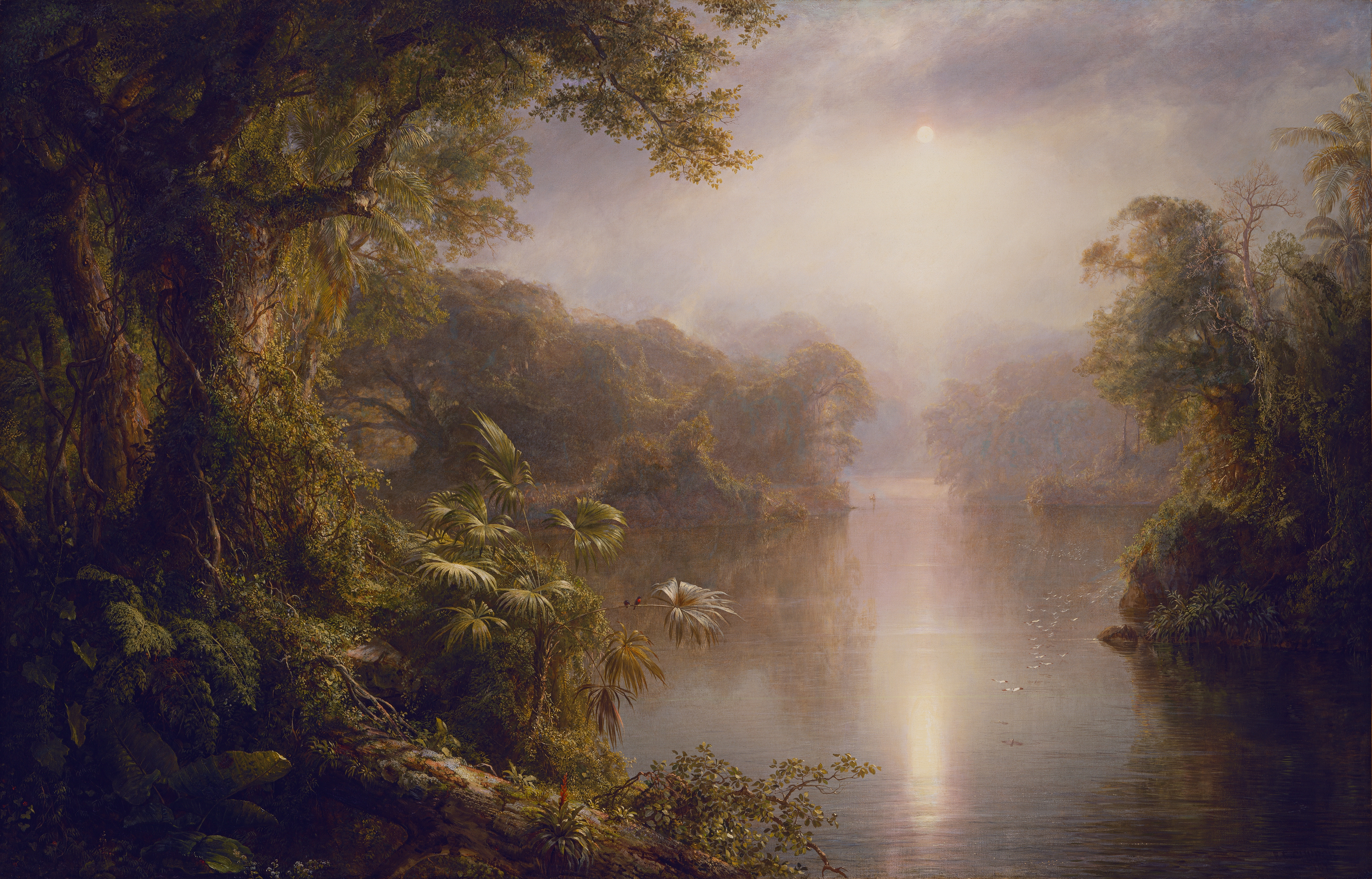
- Artist: Frederic Edwin Church
- Year: 1877
- Medium: oil on canvas
- Dimensions: 138.1 cm × 213.7 cm (54.4 in × 84.1 in)
- Location: National Gallery of Art; Washington, D.C.

El Rio de Luz (Spanish for The River of Light; also known as Morning in the Tropics) is an 1877 oil painting by American landscape artist Frederic Edwin Church. It is his last large-scale painting of South America, following pieces such as The Andes of Ecuador (1855) and The Heart of the Andes (1859). Like them, the painting is a composite of the many sketches and drawings Church made while traveling in South America twenty years earlier.

== Analysis ==
The work differs in important ways from Church's earlier, monumental South American canvases. While a high degree of realism and attention to detail remains, the landscape in The River of Light is more local; it no longer attempts to capture numerous topographies or climate zones in one image. As a result, the composition is more intimate than other South American works. The National Gallery of Art notes that "the tightly focused realism, the overall tonal harmony and restrained coloration, and the compositional unity all lend a remarkable cohesiveness to the work". The vantage point is no longer high and detached, but seemingly low enough that a viewer might stand there. Details include a canoeist, a flock of birds over the river and two others (possibly the amethyst woodstar hummingbird) perched close to the viewer, and a hut on the right bank.

Church's once-stellar reception by the 1870s had diminished, though he was still prominent; his work was often criticized for an excess of detail and a sense of melodrama. In 1880 art critic William Crary Brownell called it "a magnificent drop-curtain. A drop-curtain may be the work of incontestable genius; it may have a thousand merits; ... it is simply not painting." In the 1960s, Church scholar David C. Huntington offered interpretive reminders of the symbolism of Church's art for its 19th-century American audience, who were Christians optimistic about the future of their young country (though the Civil War, a decade past, tempered these feelings):

Morning in the Tropics is the mystical re-creation and resurrection of earth and man. A fallen Adam and a suffering world are forgotten. This is the second dawn of human consciousness and the second coming of the cosmic savior: an Easter-Genesis on the Amazon. You, remade, redeemed, twice-born spectator, are the first new man to fix his eyes on that beautiful untouched and unnamed planet. You, self-made New World man, are to be its namer. You, American, are the New Adam. Morning in the Tropics was Church's last and perhaps his greatest psychic landscape.

As in The Andes of Ecuador, the sunlight forms a subtle cross. Huntington finds in the painting the influence of Gustave Doré's prints for Paradise Lost, of engravings after J. M. W. Turner such as Bacchus and Ariadne, and illustrated books on the tropics, such as those by Paul Marcoy.

== Exhibition and provenance ==
The painting was exhibited in New York in 1877 at the Century Association (called A Tropical Morning), and in 1878 at Exposition Universelle.

William Earl Dodge, Jr. (1832–1903) was the first owner of the work and passed it to his descendants, who reported that the painting had once been called The Amazon. In 1965, it was given to the Preservation Society of Newport County, Rhode Island, and purchased in December 1965 by the National Gallery of Art. The painting was restored in 1988.

== See also ==
- List of paintings by Frederic Edwin Church
