= Dorothy Rowntree =

- Rowntree in her graduation gown.
- Born: Dorothy Rowntree; 16 January 1903; Glasgow, Scotland
- Died: 5 February 1988 (aged 85); Hampshire, England
- Other name: Dorothy Joly
- Occupation: Engineer
- Known for: First woman in the UK to qualify as a Naval Architect.

Dorothy Rowntree (16 January 1903 – 5 February 1988) was the first woman in the UK to qualify in naval architecture and the first woman to graduate in engineering from the University of Glasgow.

== Early life ==
Dorothy Rowntree was born in Glasgow, Scotland, in 1903. At the time of Dorothy Rowntree's matriculation at the University of Glasgow, her father, Robert Stanley Rowntree, was a surveyor to Lloyd's Register of Shipping and Dorothy is registered as living in Westbourne Gardens, in Kelvinside, an area of Glasgow.

== Education ==
Rowntree began studying at the University of Glasgow in the academic year 1922/23. She achieved a BSc Engineering (Naval Architecture) on 24 April 1926, the first woman graduate in engineering from the University and the first woman graduate in the UK in naval architecture.

== Working life ==
Rowntree worked in Fairfield Shipbuilding Yard then subsequently moved to Beirut, Lebanon, and worked from 1928 for President Professor Bayard Dodge, American University of Beirut. Whilst there, she wrote an article on her travelling experiences in the Middle East for The Woman Engineer, the journal of the Women's Engineering Society of which she was a member. Rowntree appears in the "Inspiring Women" list of the Women's Engineering Society.

== Personal life ==
In Beirut, Rowntree met Norman Joly and married him. The couple lived in Palestine and Israel and returned to Lebanon in 1948. They had two sons. Rowntree died in Hampshire, England, in 1988.
