= G. H. Nichols and Company =

- Founded: 1872
- Founder: G. H. Nichols
- Headquarters: USA

G. H. Nichols and Company was an American industrial chemistry company founded by William Henry Nichols and his partner, Charles W. Walter.

== Background ==
In 1870, Nichols, assisted by Walter, started making acids. He attended the Brooklyn Polytechnic Institute when it was a prep school and worked at the institute laboratory for two years. Nichols later enrolled at Cornell University in the Science Department with the class of 1872, staying only for a few months. For a supposed participation in a prank, he was expelled from Cornell, refusing to divulge or acknowledge the names of his accomplices. Nichols then went to New York University, where he received his bachelor's degree in 1870, and his M.S. in 1873. His choice of career was attributed to, or influenced by John W. Draper, under whom he chose to study. Draper was considered an outstanding chemist who later became a founder of the American Chemical Society.

In an interview conducted by Gerhard Hershfeld, Nichols revealed that the greatest characteristic of his father (George Henry Nichols) was his "bent for research." He also described his father George as a dreamer who was "always trying to figure out what the world would look like twenty years hence." During the 1870s, with the coming of the electrical age, Nichols put every bit of his ability and resources into producing high-grade copper on a large scale. Nichols was the first man in the chemical industry to use pyrite (the common sulphide of iron) in place of brimstone. According to Nichols in an interview, "the more he discovered, the more he found to discover, and the greater his business grew, the greater was his effort to make it grow."

== G. H. Nichols and Company and production ==
In 1872, both Nichols and Walter, in order to expand their acid production to sulphuric acid and support their entrepreneurial needs, formed G. H. Nichols and Company, with the financial backing of William's father George Henry Nichols. The company was so named for two reasons: 1) George Henry Nichols provided the majority of the capital; and 2) because William and Walter were too young to incorporate a company in New York State. During their partnership, Nichols looked after the plant and laboratory, while Walter took care of the office and business. Sometime during 1872, the company purchased land and built buildings in the Laurel Hill (now Maspeth) neighborhood in Queens, New York on Newtown Creek. This site offered good fishing, and it afforded convenient water and rail transportation to move their raw and finished material. In 1875, Walter died, leaving the firm's entire responsibility to Nichols.

Nichols hired chemist John Brown Francis Herreshoff in 1880 or 1882. Herreshoff invented and built a water-jacketed furnace and quickly became a partner in the company.

From the 1870s to the 1880s, the sulfuric acid produced by the company from the mineral brimstone was stronger than the industry standard, thus upsetting their competition, and greatly increasing their market share. The 1880s were the decades in which both G. H. Nichols and Company and adjoining landowner Samuel Schifflin purchased and filled in a portion of Newtown Creek. Additionally, the company developed and installed a special burner at the plant to produce sulfuric acid from pyrites, a cheaper raw material with a stable price. In order to ensure a steady supply of this raw material, the company purchased a Canadian pyrite mine. This process created a by-product, copper matte, which the company sold. Additionally, economic circumstance propelled the company to discover a new process to refine copper called the electrolytic method, a.k.a. Electrowinning.

== Expansion and renovation ==
During the 1880s, the company built and renovated a number of buildings, including two shops on the south side of the South Side Rail Road tracks (now the Lower Montauk Branch owned by and merged with the Long Island Rail Road), a building by Samuel Berg Strasser, and large additions to buildings on both sides of the railroad tracks; all of these structures were on the grounds of Laurel Hill/Newtown Creek.

During the latter part of the 19th century in 1899, Nichols Chemical Co. and 11 other companies in the heavy chemical field consolidated and formed General Chemical Co. The reason for this was because these companies believed that pooling their resources would provide greater financial strength and enable them to effect economies in operation, while at the same time they permitted broader research and better service to their customers. Along with Nichols Copper Co., some of these companies included the Martin Kalbfleisch Co., Chappel Chemical Co., Jas. Irwin & Co., National Chemical Co., Dundee Chemical Co., Fairfield Chemical Co., and others. The plants of these component companies, located near the industrial centers of Philadelphia, New York, Pittsburgh, Buffalo, Cleveland, Chicago, St. Louis, and in eastern Canada, produced and offered 33 products: sulfuric acid was the most important, while other principal chemicals included muriatic, nitric, acetic, and hydrofluoric acids, sulfate of alumina and related alums, and sulfate of soda (crude salt cake and refined Glauber's salt). All of these materials involved the use of sulfuric acid as a raw material.

== Contracts and Phelps Dodge Corporation ==
In an interview, Charles Walter Nichols (or C.W. Nichols) explained that the reason his father William Henry Nichols' business grew and became one of the largest and most successful in the country was because of Phelps Dodge with its huge copper volume. During the 1890s, the Nichols Copper Company (renamed from G.H. Nichols and Company in 1891) signed the first contract with Phelps Dodge, and since then around 90 percent of Laurel Hill's business came from Phelps Dodge. The contract also granted the Phelps Dodge Corporation to deliver a minimum of one million pounds of blister copper for over three years. This economically symbiotic relationship lasted until 1922. Phelps Dodge provided 90 percent of the blister copper Nichols Copper Company used, to produce 100 percent pure copper. During the 1920s, Phelps Dodge invested $3.5 million in the Nichols Copper Company's plant modernization projects in exchange for stock in Nichols Copper Company. The plant's production of copper dramatically increased.

According to "The Trustees of the Nichols Chemical Co.: Addition to Draft," the writer explains how Dr. James Douglas, the founder of the Phelps Dodge Corporation, suggested to William Earle Dodge that "the time would come when refineries would be built near mines." Problems these companies had to consider included transportation, distribution, and administration. In 1928, it was agreed that Nichols' capital would be increased and the stock issued to finance a proposed new plant in El Paso, Texas. All the new stock was taken by Phelps Dodge Corporation.

In 1930, Dr. William Henry Nichols died; Phelps Dodge purchased the Laurel Hill Plant that same year. According to C.W. Nichols in his interview, Phelps Dodge took an active financial interest in 1937. The construction of the El Paso refinery was covered by Phelps Dodge and Calmat Arizona purchases of Nichols' Stock.

== Bankruptcy ==
In February 1984, the company closed the El Paso refinery permanently due to high costs and changing markets. The plant's final products included copper, silver, gold, copper and nickel sulphates, and small amounts of selenium, tellurium, platinum, and palladium; the company had produced these materials throughout the twentieth century. The El Paso refinery was expected to fulfill the company's production needs. In September 1986, the company was sold to the United States Postal Service. Ten years later, the postal service sued the company for not sufficiently cleaning up the site; the court then ordered the Phelps Dodge Corporation to buy back the property. Finally, in 2001, all buildings belonging to the company were torn down.
