= Daniel Bliss =

Christian missionary

Daniel W. Bliss
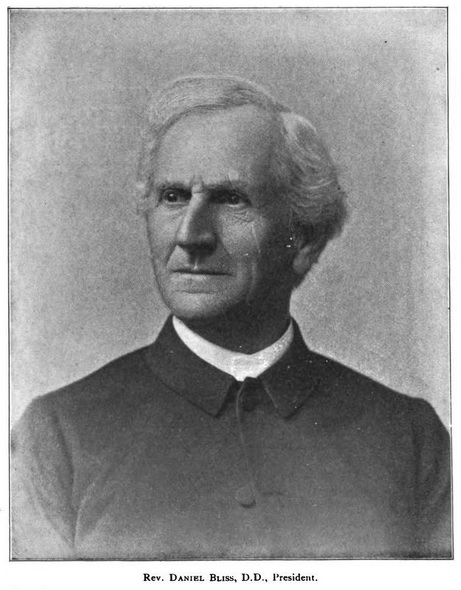
- Daniel Bliss portrait
- Born: August 17, 1823; Georgia, Vermont
- Died: July 27, 1916; Beirut, Lebanon
- Education: Amherst College; Andover Theological Seminary
- Occupations: Missionary; President of the American University of Beirut (1866-1902)
- Known for: Establishing the American University of Beirut (formerly the Syrian Protestant College)

Daniel Bliss (August 17, 1823 in Georgia, Vermont, United States – July 27, 1916 in Beirut, Lebanon) was a Christian missionary from the United States and the founder of the American University of Beirut.

== Life and work ==
Born in the town of Georgia, Vermont, Daniel was one of seven children in his household. His parents were Loomis and Susanna Bliss. His mother died when Daniel was only nine years old. Bliss spent much of his youth in the state of Ohio. He began to support himself at the age of sixteen mainly by farming, tanning, and tree grafting.

He graduated from Kingsville Academy in 1848 and went on to attend Amherst College. Once he graduated from Amherst in 1852, Bliss went on to attend Andover Theological Seminary to prepare for foreign and overseas missions. By October 1855, he was ordained at Amherst and in November of the same year he was married to Abby Maria Wood.

After being assigned to Syria by the American Board, he and his wife sailed from Boston, Massachusetts, in December 1855. By April 1856, they arrived at their destination in Aley, Lebanon. Bliss and his wife worked there for roughly one and a half years in a small school which had opened in 1843. Under his direction, the school rose into prominence in the area. From October 1858 until 1862, Bliss was in charge of a boarding school in a town just north of Aley called Souk-al-Gharb. He also studied Arabic during this time. His success there led the Syrian mission to open a new college in Lebanon. Bliss got the project chartered in 1864 by the New York State and raised funds in both the United States and the United Kingdom.

Once he had accumulated enough money, he founded the Syrian Protestant College. The school, which opened in Beirut in 1866, later came to be known as the American University of Beirut (AUB). Bliss was named president of the college he had founded and also took on the responsibilities of treasurer and Professor of Bible and Ethics. Having been one of its prime movers, he returned to the United States, arriving in New York in September 1862. He met with the American Board of Commissioners for Foreign Missions where he spoke in support of the resolutions adopted in Beirut. The Hon. William E. Dodge, impressed by Bliss's presentation, helped him form a board of trustees. A certificate of incorporation was drafted on April 18, 1863, and on April 24, 1863, a charter for establishing a college was granted by the legislature of the State of New York. A building in the AUB and a well-known street in Beirut were named after him. He resigned in 1902 and was succeeded by his son, Howard Bliss.

Daniel Bliss died on campus on July 27, 1916. He published several tracts, and is the author of a “Mental Philosophy” and “Natural Philosophy” in Arabic.

== Theology ==
Bliss described himself as being born a Baptist, raised as Methodist, ordained a Congregationalist, and serving among Presbyterians.

== Family ==
Bliss was married to Abby Maria Wood Bliss; they had four children, Frederick, Howard, William and Mary.

His grandson Huntington Bliss was the principal of Tripoli Boys’ School.

William Dodge’s son, David Stuart Dodge, became a friend of the Bliss family and taught languages at the college.
