= W. Earl Dodge =

American football player (1858–1884)

Earl Dodge
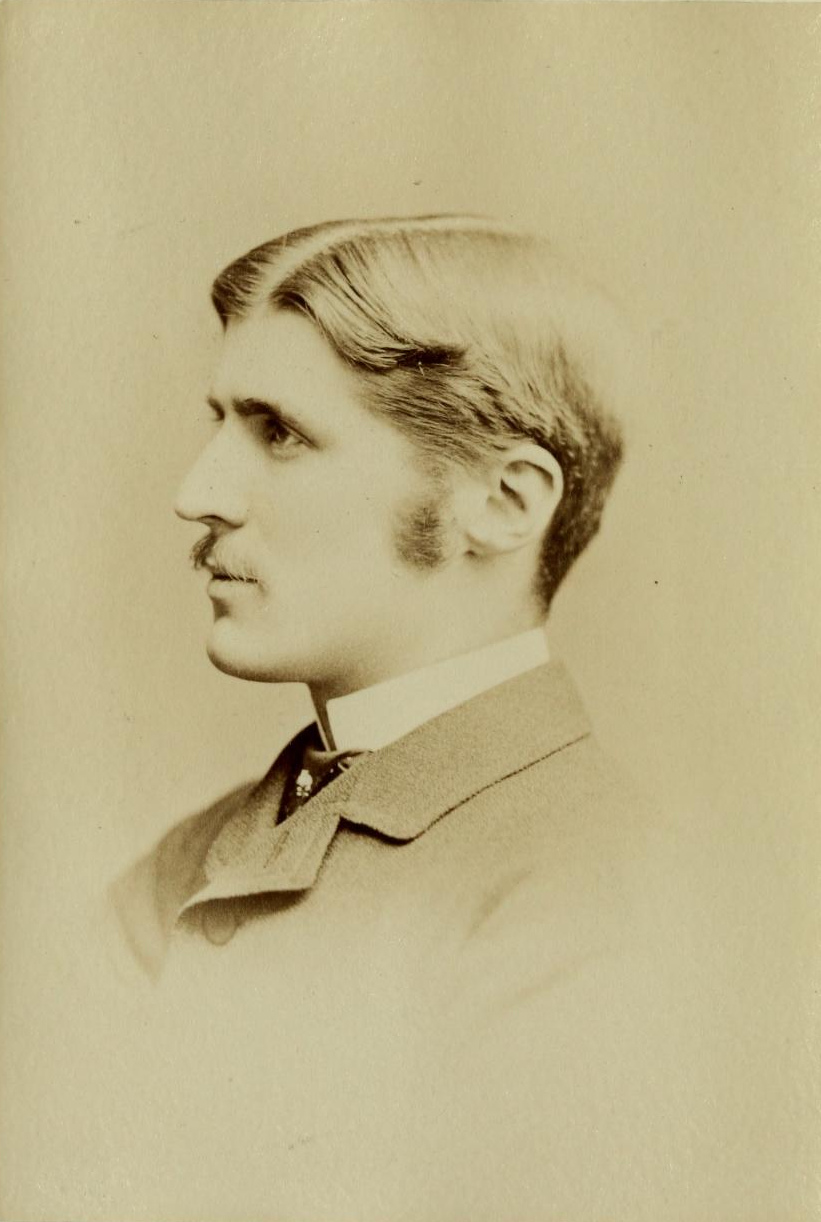

Profile
- Position: Halfback

Personal information
- Born: October 17, 1858
- Died: September 14, 1884 (aged 25)

Career information
- College: Princeton (1876–1878)

Awards and highlights
- National championship (1877)

William Earl Dodge III (October 17, 1858 – September 14, 1884), was an American college football player at Princeton University, captain of the national champion 1877 Princeton Tigers football team.

== Early life ==
Dodge was born in New York City on October 17, 1858. Commonly known as Earl, he was the eldest son of William E. Dodge Jr. Along with his younger brother Cleveland Hoadley Dodge, he attended Williston Seminary at Easthampton, Massachusetts, and was a good friend of Woodrow Wilson at Princeton.

== Career ==
Dodge was the captain of the national champion 1877 Princeton Tigers football team.

He also led the meeting of the group on Nov. 18, 1876, in East College that launched the collegiate branch of the International YMCA.

== Personal life ==
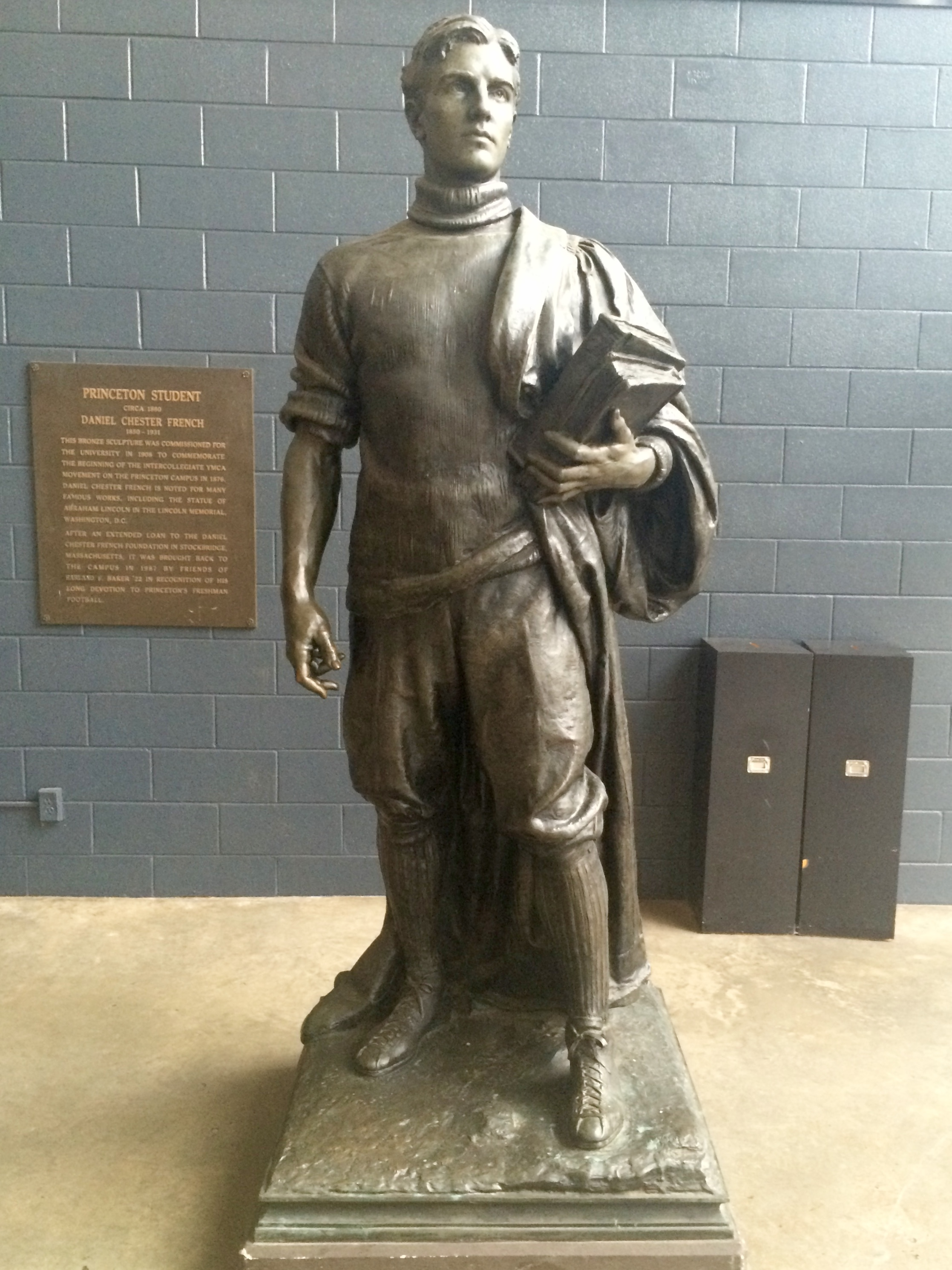
Earl Dodge Memorial (The Princeton Student), Daniel Chester French

In 1879, he married Emmeline Harriman (1859–1938), daughter of Oliver Harriman and the sister of Anne Harriman Vanderbilt, Oliver Harriman, Jr., J. Borden Harriman, and Herbert M. Harriman. Together, they were the parents of two children:

- Annie Cleveland Dodge (b. 1880), who married John H. McCullough.
- William Earl Dodge IV (1883–1927), who married Jessie Sloane (1883–1968), daughter of Henry T. Sloane. They divorced and she later remarried to George D. Widener Jr.

Dodge died on September 14, 1884. After his death, she married Stephen Henry Olin, the one-time acting president of Wesleyan University

=== Legacy ===
Dodge is the namesake of Dodge-Osborn Hall. His brother Cleveland commissioned sculptor Daniel Chester French to build a memorial to Earl, dedicated May 30, 1913. Officially titled Earl Dodge Memorial (The Princeton Student), the statue became popularly known as 'The Christian Student'.
