= Women's Central Association of Relief =

American Civil War aid organization

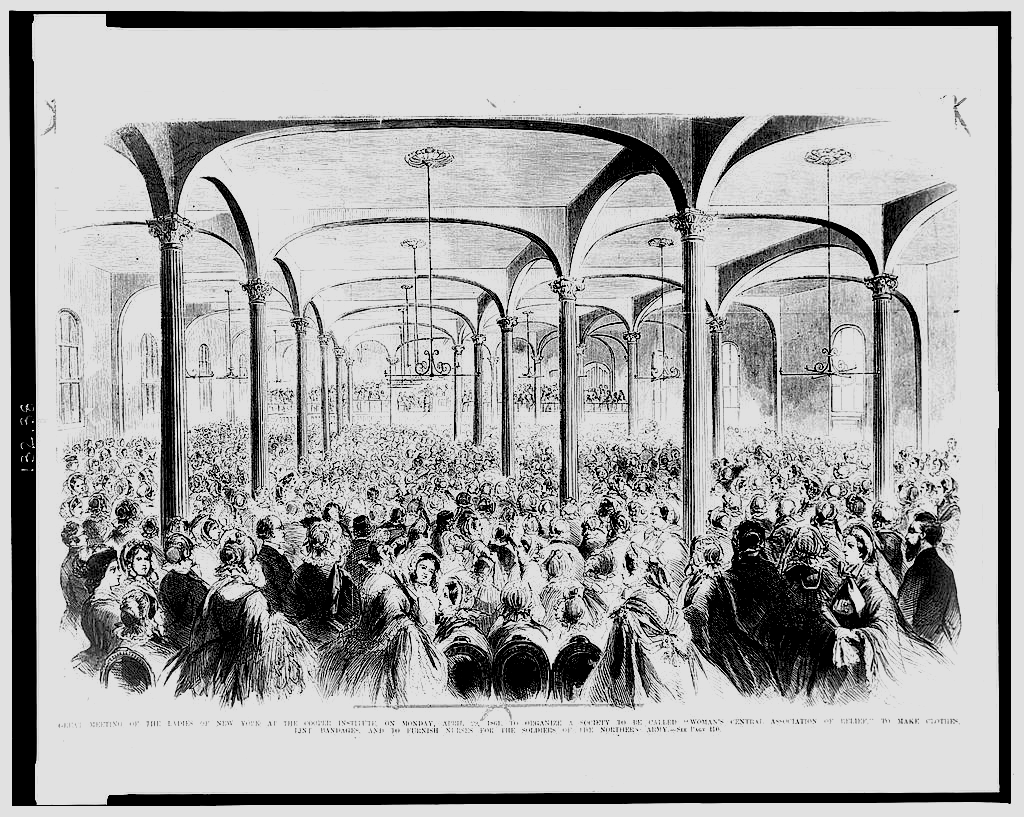
Great meeting of the ladies of New York at the Cooper Institute, on Monday, April 29, 1861, to organize a society to be called "Women's Central Association of Relief," to make clothes, lint bandages, and to furnish nurses for the soldiers of the Northern Army [1861], Unknown author

The Women's Central Association of Relief (WCAR) was an organization of women primarily active during the American Civil War, whose main function was to collect supplies in aid of the Union war effort. Founded in April 1861, it was absorbed into the United States Sanitary Commission (USSC) later that year in June before officially going into operation. Following the end of the war, the WCAR held its last official meeting in July 1865, though the organization remained functional for a small time after, until October of the same year.

== Founding ==
Following the fall of Fort Sumter, there was a series of meetings that resulted in the creation of the WCAR. The first meeting was in Cleveland on April 17, where women first met to discuss the organization of a Soldiers' Aide Society. The second was in New York on April 25, where women met at the New York Infirmary for Women to discuss what possible relief efforts they could provide in the oncoming war. Finally, on April 29, there was a grand meeting at the Cooper Institute in New York where the Women's Central Association of Relief was officially formed.

Louisa Lee Schuyler became the first president of the WCAR, and facilitated recruitment and organization in the early days of the association. The WCAR began sending representatives to the federal government, specifically the secretary of War, early in the Summer of 1861 to create an official connection to the government to further the aid of soldiers. On June 9, 1861, the WCAR became a branch of the United States Sanitary Commission.

== Function during the Civil War ==
A prominent function of the WCAR was to collect donations on behalf of the USSC and redistribute them accordingly among the army. In addition to money collections, donations included a wide range of supplies, from clothes, bedding, and food. Medical supplies aside, the largest collection was donations of clothes for soldiers. This includes coats, flannel shirts, trousers, socks, and general cotton.

Another function of the WCAR was the registration and training of female nurses. With a program run by Dr. Elizabeth Blackwell, the association had 60 nurses registered with the Registration Committee and trained by Dorothea Dix by 1862. Due to its efficiency in collecting donations and providing nurses to military hospitals, the WCAR held a fairly respectable relationship with the military.
