= Ingleside, Dobbs Ferry =

Coordinates: 41°0′25.0″N 73°52′51.7″W

Ingleside is an American country house overlooking the Hudson River in Dobbs Ferry, New York. It is one of only three survivors of the Gothic Revival "Hudson River castles" built in the mid-nineteenth century, in the now "heavily suburbanized strip" between Riverdale, north of Manhattan, and North Tarrytown. There were at least eighteen villas with picturesque "manor house" details on this reach of the Hudson, as well as two full-blown châteaux: Strawberry Hill, Irvington (c. 1855) and Glenview, Yonkers (considerably altered, now the Hudson River Museum). Ingleside was built in 1854-57 for the English immigrant Edwin B. Strange, a silk importer in New York City, who commissioned its design from Alexander Jackson Davis, the pre-eminent American architect of picturesque villas with Gothic Revival detailing. Much of the original crenellations have been removed over the years, but the stuccoed villa still stands, housing St. Christopher's School, Dobbs Ferry.
