= David S. Dodge =

American politician and academic administrator (1922–2009)

David Dodge
- Born: David Stuart Dodge; November 17, 1922; Beirut, Lebanon
- Died: January 20, 2009 (aged 86); Princeton, New Jersey, U.S.
- Education: Princeton University (BA, MA)
- Relatives: Bayard Dodge (father)

David Stuart Dodge (November 17, 1922 – January 20, 2009) was an American politician and university president. He was the Vice-President for Administration (1979–83), Acting President (1981–82) and President (1996–97) of the American University of Beirut (AUB).

== Early life ==
Dodge was born in Beirut on November 17, 1922. Dodge was a member of a prominent American family who were closely involved with Lebanon for well over a century. His father was Bayard Dodge, a former AUB president, his maternal grandfather was Howard Bliss, also a former president, and his great-grandfather was Daniel Bliss, who founded AUB in 1866. His paternal grandfather, Cleveland Hoadley Dodge, was a founder of the Near East Foundation.

Dodge received his high school education at Deerfield Academy and received a B.A. degree from Princeton University in 1945. For his masters, also at Princeton, he studied Arabic and Middle East Studies.

== Career ==
Dodge served in the OSS during World War II. After the war, he found employment at Aramco in the late 1940s and worked for the Trans-Arabian Pipeline Company; the Tapline (TAPCO) from 1952 to 1977. He returned to the States and served as president of the Near East Foundation from 1977 to 1979.

In 1961, Mr. Dodge had joined the Board of Trustees of AUB. In 1979, he returned to Beirut and joined the faculty of AUB. He served as acting president of AUB from 1981 to 1982, when his service was interrupted violently. Following his ordeal, Mr. Dodge moved to Princeton, New Jersey, where he worked briefly as recording secretary of Princeton University. That same year (1983), he rejoined the board of AUB. He served as president of AUB from 1996 to 1997 from its offices in New York City.

During his career, Dodge also served as president of the Cleveland H. Dodge Foundation.

=== Hostage ===
On July 19, 1982, Dodge was abducted from the AUB campus by pro-Iranian Shiite Muslim extremists, flown to a prison near Tehran, and held until his release exactly one year later. The New York Times would write after Dodge's death, "The kidnapping, and the ensuing diplomatic efforts to secure Mr. Dodge’s release, received worldwide news coverage." The Syrian government helped secure his release from Iran, after being held initially in Lebanon. The kidnapping was considered significant because it directly implicated Iran in the hostage-taking activities of Shiite factions in Lebanon. Malcolm Kerr, who preceded Dodge as president of AUB, was shot and killed outside his AUB office in January 1984.

== Personal life ==
Dodge married Doris Westfall Dodge; they were married until her death in 2000. Together, they had four children.

After the death of his first wife in 2000, he remarried to the former Margaret White in 2002.

Dodge retired to Princeton. He died there of cancer on January 20, 2009. He was survived by his second wife Margaret (née Keating) White.

== See also ==
- List of kidnappings
