= William E. Dodge =

American businessman

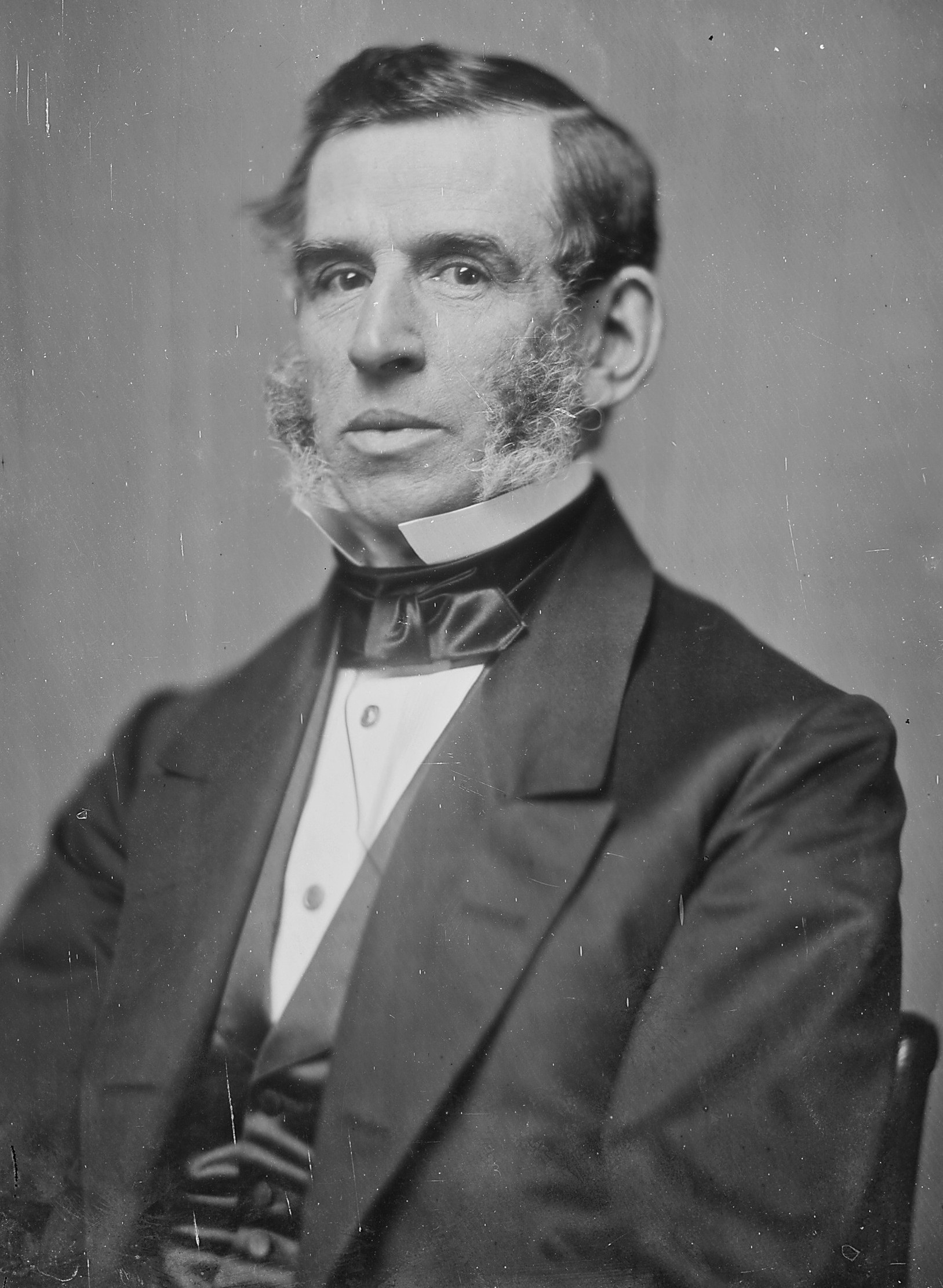

Member of the U.S. House of Representatives from New York's 8th district
- In office April 7, 1866 – March 3, 1867
- Preceded by: James Brooks
- Succeeded by: James Brooks

Personal details
- Born: September 4, 1805 Hartford, Connecticut
- Died: February 9, 1883 (aged 77) New York City, New York
- Resting place: Woodlawn Cemetery
- Party: Republican
- Spouse: Melissa Phelps
- Children: 7
- Occupation: Businessman, politician, activist

William Earl Dodge Sr. (September 4, 1805 – February 9, 1883) was an American businessman, politician, and activist. He was referred to as one of the "Merchant Princes" of Wall Street in the years leading up to the American Civil War. Dodge saw slavery as an evil to be peaceably removed, but not to be interfered with where it existed. He was a Native American rights activist and served as the president of the National Temperance Society from 1865 to 1883. Dodge represented New York's 8th congressional district in the United States Congress for a portion of the 39th United States Congress in 1866–1867 and was a founding member of the YMCA of the US.

== Biography ==
William Earl Dodge was born in Hartford, Connecticut, the second son of David Low Dodge, founder of the New York Peace Society, and his wife Sarah Cleveland, the daughter of minister Aaron Cleveland. He married Melissa Phelps (1809–1903), a daughter of Anson Green Phelps and Olivia Egleston. The couple had seven sons. In 1833, Dodge and his father-in-law founded the trading firm Phelps, Dodge and Company. In 1908 they became one of Americas largest mining companies Phelps Dodge Corporation.

Dodge is the namesake of Dodge County, Georgia. A consortium of businessmen led by Dodge purchased large tracts of timberland in this area following the Civil War. The Dodge Land Company laid claim to over 300,000 acres (1,200 km^{2}) of land through questionable land deeds. The consortium's ownership of these lands led to land wars which resulted in nearly fifty years of court cases.

Dodge and his associates built the Macon and Brunswick Railroad, connecting Macon to what was then a remote area of the state. Dodge County was formed in 1870 and Eastman, the county seat, was established at the railroad's Station Number 13. Dodge visited the area only once, to dedicate a two-story courthouse that he donated to the county. Dodge's sons later administered the timber businesses in this area.

Dodge was active in the post-Civil War Native American policy reform movement. He joined Peter Cooper in organizing the privately funded United States Indian Commission in 1868 and helped institute Ulysses S. Grant's Peace Policy toward Native Americans. In 1869, Dodge toured the Indian Territory (present-day Oklahoma) and Kansas as a member of the government-sponsored Board of Indian Commissioners. He met and discussed U.S. Indian policy with representatives of the Cheyenne, Arapaho and Kiowa nations. Dodge lobbied for the prosecution of the U.S. cavalry commanders responsible for the 1870 Marias Massacre in Montana, which left 173 Blackfeet dead. Dodge unsuccessfully campaigned to establish a cabinet-level Department for Indian Affairs. He also used his influence in Washington on behalf of Native educational programs and the General Allotment Act of 1887. Dodge's core belief regarding Native Americans during the 1880s was that the only way to save Native Americans from perceived destructed from Euro-American immigration and railway development was the forced education of Native American children that would ultimately lead to American citizenship.

A monument to William E. Dodge stands on the North side of Bryant Park in New York City.

Dodge was a founding member of the board of trustees for the Syrian Protestant College, later renamed the American University of Beirut. As Treasurer, he laid the cornerstone of College Hall, the first building on the present campus in Ras Beirut, on December 7, 1871.

His eldest son, William Earl Dodge Jr., assumed control of the Phelps Dodge company after his death.

Family Tree of William Earl Dodge

David Low Dodge (1774-1852)	Married; 1798	Sarah Cleveland (1780-1862)	Anson Green Phelps (1781-1853)	Married; 1806	Olivia Egleston (1784-1859)
William Earl Dodge (1805-1883)	Married; 1828	Melissa Phelps (1809-1903)
William E. Dodge Jr. (1832-1903) m.1854 Sarah Hoadley (1832-1909)	Anson Greene Phelps Dodge (1834-1918) m(1).1859 Rebecca Grew (1836-1927) m(2).1886 Rachel Rose Voorhees (1852-1910)	David Stuart Dodge (1836-1921) m(1).1860 Ellen Ada Phelps (1838-1880) m(2).1885 Elizabeth Scott Boyd (1846-1888)	Charles Cleveland Dodge (1841-1910) m.1863 Maria Theresa; Bradhurst Schieffelin (1840-1910)	Norman White Dodge (1846-1907) m(1).1869 Grace Gillette (1848-1870) m(2).1880 Emma Hartley (1849-1881) m(3).1897 Grace Vernon (1870-1953)	George Eglestone; Dodge (1849-1904) m.1874 May Cossitt (1853-1911)	Arthur Murray Dodge (1852-1896) m.1875 Josephine Jewell (1855-1928)

== See also ==
- William E. Dodge Jr.
- Cleveland Hoadley Dodge
- Bayard Dodge
- David S. Dodge
- Marcellus Hartley Dodge Sr.

U.S. House of Representatives
Preceded by James Brooks	Member of the U.S. House of Representatives from New York's 8th congressional district April 7, 1866 - March 3, 1867	Succeeded by James Brooks
