= David Stuart Dodge =

American clergyman

Rev. David Stuart Dodge (1836–1921) was a friend and supporter of the Reverend Dr. Daniel Bliss, the founder of the Syrian Protestant College, Beirut. Dodge became the professor for English and modern languages at the institute, a position he held for nine years. He was later appointed the America-based chairman of trustees for the college.

== Syrian Protestant College ==
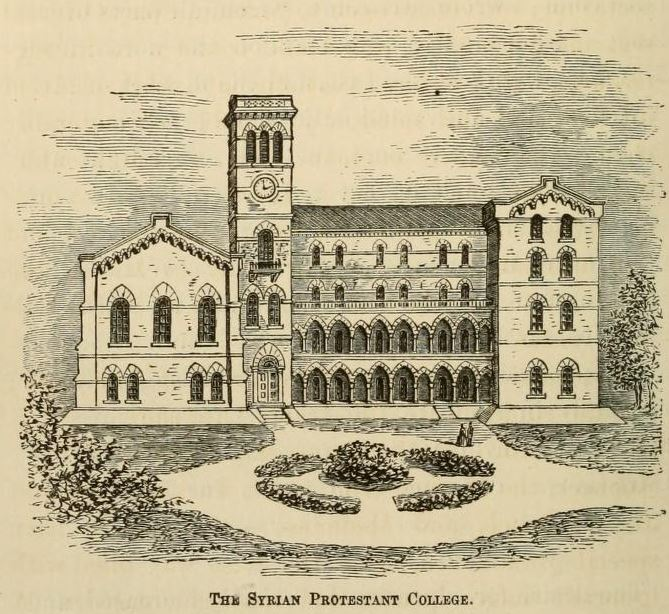
The Syrian Protestant College c1874

Dodge was the third son of wealthy New York merchant William Earl Dodge and Melissa Phelps. He was educated at the Phillips Academy at Andover before attending Yale and later the Union Theological Seminary from where he graduated in 1860. In the same year he married, Ellen Ada Phelps, the daughter of John Jay Phelps and Rachel Badgeley Phinney. (Note: The Dodge and Phelps families were next door neighbours in Madison Avenue.) Their honeymoon took them to the Holy Land where they met and befriended the Reverend Daniel Bliss and his wife Abby Wood who had been in Syria for five years, working for the American Board of Commissioners for Foreign Missions, initially running a small school and later a larger boarding school for girls.

The American missionaries saw the need for a higher education facility in Syria, but funding had to be raised independently. Bliss was asked to spearhead this task and in 1862 travelled to America to seek sponsorship, where he met Dodge's father who became the College's largest sponsor. In 1866 Bliss returned to Beirut with Dodge and sufficient money to make a start; they initially rented a house where they taught sixteen students, with Dodge as the first professor. Four years later they had acquired a site to build the Syrian Protestant College and Dodge returned to America to seek further funding. The corner stone of the main building was laid in 1872 by Dodge's father.

== Career ==
Dodge was ordained in 1864 and was awarded the honorary degree of Doctor of Divinity by Yale in 1899. As well as serving as president of the board of trustees of the Syrian Protestant College, a position he held until his death in 1921, he was president of the Presbyterian Board of Home Missions, president of the National Temperance Society and president of the Chester Crest Home for Intemperate Men. Dodge also compiled and edited a biography of his father called Memorials of William E. Dodge, published in 1887. A core element of this work was his father's reminiscences recorded by a stenographer before his death in 1883.

== Twombly Motor Car ==
In 1915 Dodge filed a petition for bankruptcy against the Twombly group of motor companies. He was president and chief backer of the business and was claiming the return of $428,238 for loans and interest on the money. He had taken over the stock from his brother, Charles Cleveland Dodge, who had died in 1910. Willard Irving Twombly was an inventor involved with the early production of steam-powered cars and was developing a low-cost vehicle suitable for the taxi-cab industry. Within a year of this petition, Twombly was in court accused of having an affair with Ethel Helen Long, the wife of Francis Reese, who sued him for alienation, demanding $50,000. Twombly divorced his first wife and married Long, but the relationship soured, and she eventually accused him of bigamy and misconduct, for which he was sent to prison in Michigan. (Note: In later life Twombly used Osgood for his middle name (mother's maiden name))

== Family ==
Dodge was widowed in 1880 and remarried in 1885 to Elizabeth Scott Boyd who died in 1888. Dodge died on the 17 December 1921 in Manhattan, New York. He had five children from his first marriage to Ellen Ada Phelps. They were Ellen Ada Dodge (1862-1883); Walter Phelps Dodge (1869-1931); Francis Phelps Dodge (1872-1926); Guy Phelps Dodge (1874-1923) and Clarence Phelps Dodge (1877-1939). After his death his nephew, Cleveland Hoadley Dodge, said of him that he had led a long and useful life but was critical of his four sons who "instead of being a great comfort to him in his old age, were all clamouring for money, and trying to get what they could out of him, and made his life miserable".

Family Tree of David Stuart Dodge

David Low Dodge (1774-1852)	Married; 1798	Sarah Cleveland (1780-1862)	Anson Green Phelps (1781-1853)	Married; 1806	Olivia Egleston (1784-1859)
William Earl Dodge (1805-1883)	Married; 1828	Melissa Phelps (1809-1903)
William E. Dodge, Jr. (1832-1903) m.1854 Sarah Hoadley (1832-1909)	Anson Greene Phelps Dodge (1834-1918) m(1).1859 Rebecca Grew (1836-1927) m(2).1886 Rachel Rose Voorhees (1852-1910)	David Stuart Dodge (1836-1921) m(1).1860 Ellen Ada Phelps (1838-1880) m(2).1885 Elizabeth Scott Boyd (1846-1888)	Charles Cleveland Dodge (1841-1910) m.1863 Maria Theresa; Bradhurst Schieffelin (1840-1910)	Norman White Dodge (1846-1907) m(1).1869 Grace Gillette (1848-1870) m(2).1880 Emma Hartley (1849-1881)	George Eglestone; Dodge (1849-1904) m.1874 May Cossitt (1853-1911)	Arthur Murray Dodge (1852-1896) m.1875 Josephine Jewell (1855-1928)

== Daughter's elopement ==
In 1878 Dodge's sixteen-year-old daughter, Ellen Ada, eloped with her first cousin, eighteen-year-old Anson Greene Phelps Dodge Jr., (1860–1898). The parents gave chase and the incident was reported widely in both the national and international newspapers; eventually they were located in Washington where they were attempting to get a marriage license. They were separated, but permitted to marry two years later in London; Ellen Ada died in 1883 whilst visiting India with her husband. Her body was returned to the United States and buried in the church on St Simon's Island, Georgia. Anson was ordained after studying at the General Theological Seminary, New York, and returned to St Simon's Island, where he became the rector at the same church.

== Son's prank misfires ==
Dodge faced further problems with his children when his son, Walter Phelps Dodge (1869-1931), put a notice in New York newspapers in 1888, falsely announcing his engagement and marriage to cousin Miss Lily Stokes. At first he denied having done this but eventually admitted to it. He was attending Yale University at the time and the authorities there took a dim view of his behaviour. He was shipped off to Europe, where he promptly married Ida Rose Lena Cooke, the seventeen-year-old daughter of trapeze artist and circus proprietor, Alfred Eugene Godolphin Cooke – "The Marvellous Eugene". Walter continued his education abroad before returning to America for a period. He attended Oxford and studied English law, being called to the bar at the Middle Temple, London in 1899. He wrote and published several short stories and historical works. (Note: Lily Stokes was the grand-daughter of James Boulter Stokes and Caroline Phelps.)
