= Phelps Dodge =

Company

Phelps Dodge Corporation

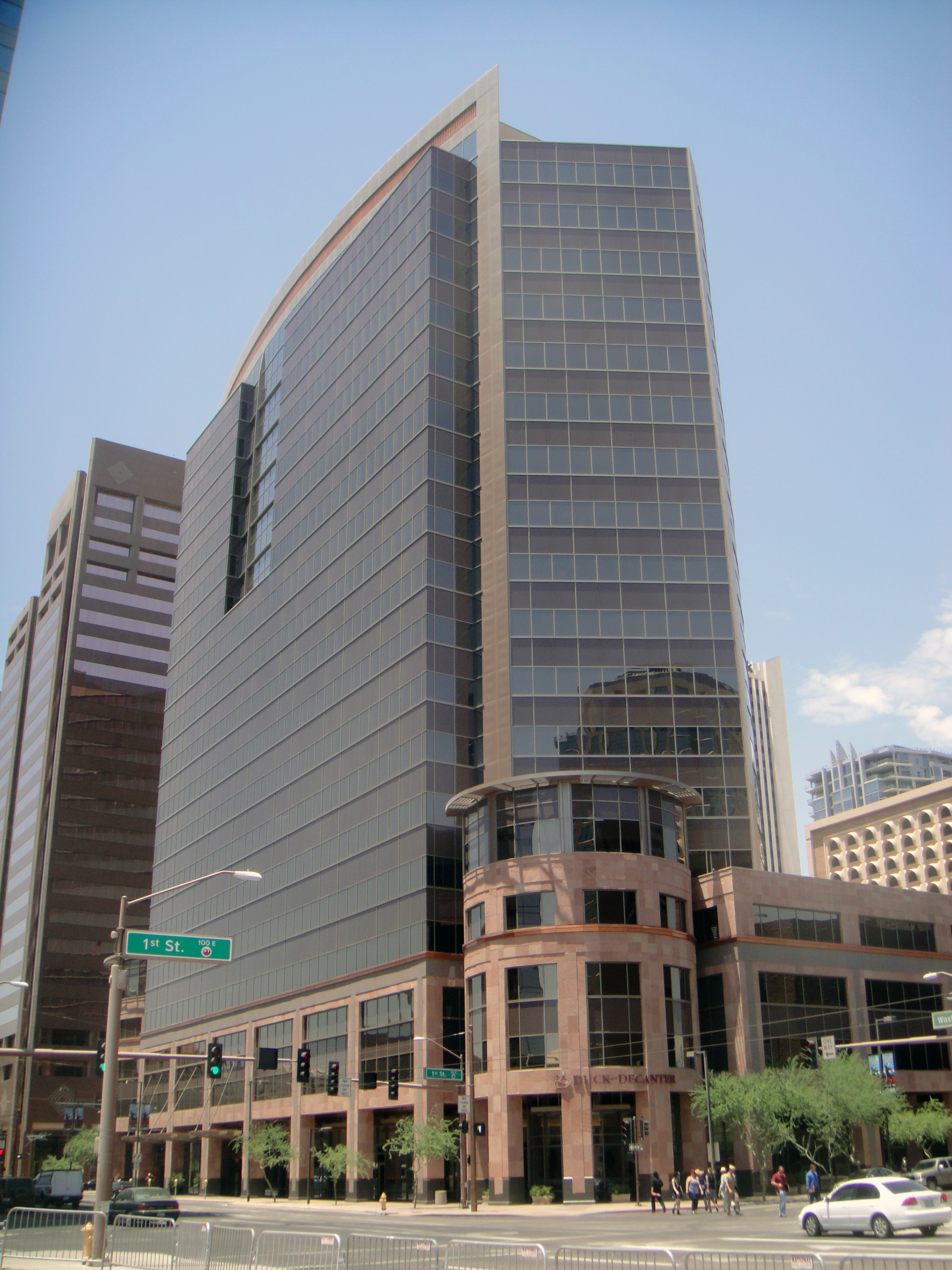
- Phelps Dodge Tower in downtown Phoenix.
- Type: Subsidiary
- Traded as: NYSE: PD until 2007
- Industry: Mining
- Founded: 1834
- Founders: William Earle Dodge, Sr.; Anson Greene Phelps
- Defunct: 2007
- Fate: Friendly takeover
- Headquarters: Phoenix, Arizona, United States
- Key people: J. Steven Whisler, Chairman & CEO
- Products: Copper
- Number of employees: 15,000 (2006)
- Parent: Freeport-McMoRan

Phelps Dodge Corporation was an American mining company founded in 1834 as an import-export firm by Anson Greene Phelps and his two sons-in-law William Earle Dodge, Sr. and Daniel James. The latter two ran Phelps, James & Co., the part of the organization based in Liverpool, England. The import-export firm at first exported United States cotton from the Deep South to England and imported various metals to the US needed for industrialization. With the expansion of the Western frontier in North America, the corporation acquired mines and mining companies, including the Copper Queen Mine in Cochise County, Arizona and the Dawson, New Mexico coal mines. It operated its own mines and acquired railroads to carry its products. By the late 19th century, it was known as a mining company.

On March 19, 2007, Freeport-McMoRan completed a $25.9 billion acquisition of Phelps Dodge Corporation.

== History ==
in 1821, Anson G. Phelps started a partnership in New York City with Elisha Peck, a merchant who had been in trade in Berlin, Connecticut. Peck moved to Liverpool to run the British end of their business, an import-export company that shipped US-grown cotton from the Deep South to England, importing tin, iron, copper and other metals essential for industrial growth and development in the United States. In 1834, Peck left the business and was replaced in Liverpool by Daniel James, who remained there until his death in 1876. It was at this time that the concern of Phelps Dodge and Company was begun.

In 1940, the Phelps Dodge Corporation provided the copper used to bind a commemorative book on the making of the film Arizona. The text inside the back cover reads "Columbia Pictures gratefully acknowledges the cooperation of the Phelps Dodge Corporation in making available the copper in the covers of this book."

== Expansion ==
When Anson G. Phelps died, his sons-in-law purchased his portion of the company, but retained the name, and the import-export business. In 1880, the company invested in the Detroit Copper Company of Clifton, Arizona, at the time a very small copper camp in the eastern Arizona Territory. Phelps-Dodge interested Dr. James Douglas of Phoenixville, Pennsylvania to inspect the property and make recommendations. Dr. Douglas inspected the Detroit Copper Co of Morenci and also ventured south to the Warren District. On his advice, Phelps-Dodge began its own mining operations in the Warren District with the purchase of the Atlanta Copper Mine in 1882, neighboring the Copper Queen Mine. When both mines discovered the same ore body, instead of fighting over it, they merged in 1885, creating the Copper Queen Consolidated Mining Company. The Copper Queen Mine in Bisbee, Arizona Territory, became one of the most productive in the state of the early 20th century.

The company focused largely on providing copper wire and cables to industry, products that were in high demand as the Industrial Revolution took hold. As the company diversified, it began investing in new railroads, essential in the company's efforts to keep costs as low as possible, especially in Arizona Territory. It used its own lines to transport products to and from major railroads for its markets on the eastern/northeastern shores.

In 1895, the first contract was signed by Phelps Dodge and Company and the Nichols Copper Company (which was renamed from G. H. Nichols and Company in 1891) to have Phelps Dodge deliver a minimum of 1,000,000 pounds (450,000 kg) of blister copper over three years. This economically symbiotic relationship lasted until 1922, in which Phelps Dodge provided 90% of the blister copper Nichols Copper Company used to produce 100% pure copper. During the 1920s, Phelps Dodge invested $3.5 million in the Nichols Copper Company's plant modernization projects in exchange for stock in Nichols Copper Company. This dramatically increased copper production of the plant. In 1930, Dr. William Henry Nichols died; Phelps Dodge purchased the Laurel Hill plant that same year.

During the late 19th century, in concert with its metal interests, Phelps Dodge Corporation became one of the largest producers of lumber and lumber products in the United States.

In Tombstone, Arizona during 1900, E. B. Gage, Frank Murphy, and William Staunton consolidated their various mining properties into a single entity, the Tombstone Consolidated Mines Company. They worked to drain mines that had filled with water, laid a rail spur into town, and revived mining. They experienced some success until the pumps failed in 1909. The new company filed for bankruptcy and the Phelps-Dodge Corporation acquired its claims.

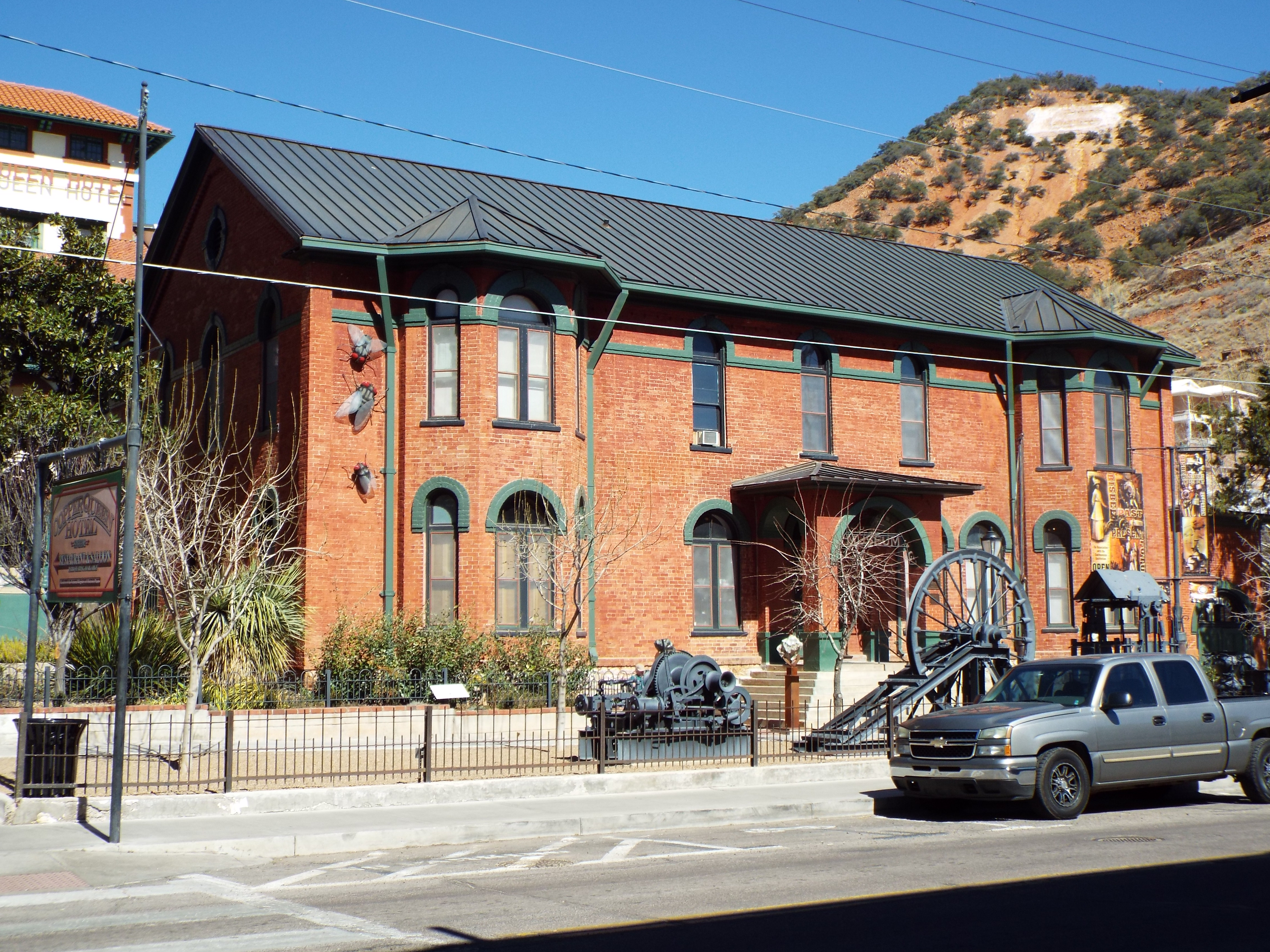
The Phelps Dodge Headquarters Building in Bisbee, Arizona.

In 1908, with the Phelps Dodge owners no longer alive, the company was re-organized as a public company and the name changed to Phelps Dodge Corporation, a holding company for all of the various properties and operations. Dr. Douglas was its first president.

== Labor relations ==
The company became notorious for its anti-union tactics, primarily for the 1917 Bisbee Deportation. The company worked with a local group of private citizens and the county sheriff to deputize about 2,000 members of a posse. Given names of Industrial Workers of the World (IWW) members and other miners, they arrested nearly 1,300 striking miners at gunpoint in an early morning raid at Bisbee, Lowell and Warren. Portraying those affiliated with the IWW as bent on war-related sabotage, the company ordered them expelled from the jurisdiction, deporting them to Hermanas, New Mexico. Company officials and Sheriff Harry C. Wheeler seized telegraph and telephone lines to keep news of this from getting out.

The Phelps Dodge copper mine at Morenci, Arizona was the site of a violent strike from 1983 to 1986, culminating in one of the largest union decertifications in American labor history.

== Subdivisions ==
In South America, the company had several very large copper mining operations in Peru. In the Congo of Africa, Phelps Dodge Corporation was the majority owner and operator of the Tenke Fungurume project, generally considered to be the world's largest undeveloped copper/cobalt project.

A subsidiary of Phelps Dodge Corporation, Climax Molybdenum, is the largest primary producer of molybdenum in the world. At the Henderson mine west of Empire, Colorado, Climax Molybdenum has produced more than 160 million tons of ore and 770 million pounds of molybdenum since the mine opened in 1976. Climax Molybdenum also owns the Climax molybdenum mine, north of Leadville, Colorado.

In 1906, Phelps-Dodge acquired the Dawson Fuel Company of Dawson, New Mexico to mine coal for its copper smelting operations. Major accidents include the explosion at the Dawson Stag Canyon No. 2 mine which resulted in 264 deaths, and is one of the deadliest coal mining accidents in U.S. history.

The company employed more than 13,500 people worldwide.

== Expansion and acquisition ==
On Sunday, November 19, 2006, Freeport-McMoRan announced that it planned to acquire Phelps Dodge for $25.9 billion in cash and stock. Stockholders for both companies voted on the proposal March 14, 2007. On Monday, March 19, 2007, Phelps Dodge Corporation was acquired by Freeport-McMoRan (NYSE: FCX), creating the world's largest publicly traded copper company, with 25,000 employees at acquisition.

At the time of its acquisition in 2007, Phelps Dodge Corporation had large copper mining operations in Bagdad, Morenci, Sahuarita, Safford and Miami, Arizona. In New Mexico, the Tyrone, between Lordsburg and Silver City and the El Chino Mine, northeast of Bayard. Several of these locations provide ores rich in molybdenum as well. It had recently begun development of the Safford Mine near Safford, Arizona. In 2006, revenue was $11.910 billion USD, operating income was $4.226 billion, and net income was $3.017 billion.

== Environmental record ==
As of 2013, the Political Economy Research Institute identified Phelps Dodge as the 41st-largest corporate producer of Air pollution in the United States, with roughly 4.50 million pounds of toxins released annually into the air. Major pollutants included sulfuric acid, chromium compounds, lead compounds, and chlorine. The Center for Public Integrity has reported that Phelps Dodge is named as a potentially responsible party in at least 13 Superfund toxic waste sites.

== Worker death ==
By June 1998, Reynaldo Delgado had worked for the Phelps Dodge smelting plant in Hurley, New Mexico, for two years. The plant had recently incurred a 10-day shut-down, and, on June 30, 1998, the crew Mr. Delgado was assigned to was short-handed. When the crew encountered an emergency situation known as a "runaway," Mr. Delgado's supervisors ordered him to enter – alone – a tunnel to remove a ladle that was overflowing with molten slag. Mr. Delgado was not qualified to perform this task and had never done so under runaway conditions, facts which he repeatedly told his supervisors. Following several instances of protesting and requesting help, which were refused by his supervisors, Mr. Delgado was sent to perform this task. There was an explosion inside the tunnel, and he subsequently emerged from the tunnel fully engulfed in flames and collapsed at the scene. He suffered third degree burns over his entire body and later died at an Arizona hospital.

== See also ==
- Cleveland Hoadley Dodge
- James Douglas
