= List of American University of Beirut alumni =

The American University of Beirut is a private international university which has its campus in Beirut, Lebanon. As of January 2020, the university has 9,495 students, 1,214 faculty and over 70,000 alumni.

== Afghanistan ==
Name	Class year	Notability	Ref(s)
Anwar ul-Haq Ahady	1973	Minister of Commerce and Industry (2010–2013), Minister of Finance (2004–2009)	
Farouq Azam	1973	chairman, Movement for Peaceful Transformation of Afghanistan. Ex-minister of education, ex-minister of refugees & repatriates	
Ashraf Ghani	1973	president of Afghanistan 2014-2021	
Yousef Pashtun	1973	Minister of urban development (2002, 2004–2009), governor of Kandahar Province (2003)	

== Armenia ==
Name	Class year	Notability	Ref(s)
Avedis Donabedian	1944	Armenian doctor and pioneer in study of health care, known for the Donabedian model	

== Bahrain ==
- Yusuf Al-Shirawi (former minister of trade and industry)
- Ali Fakhro (former minister health between 1972 and 1982, and education between 1982 and 1995. The first Bahraini medical doctor)
- Abdulrahman Mohammed Jamsheer (leading businessman and chairman of the foreign affairs, defence and national security of the Shura Council in the Kingdom of Bahrain)
- Amal Joseph Mousa Zabaneh (currently dean at the University of Bahrain-College of Health Sciences, director of Quality and Excellence Centre 2010–2017 – Arabian Gulf University, associate dean of the College of Health Sciences 1999–2004, head analyst head registration and student affairs 1983–1998, Bahrain Flour Mills 1980–1982 Bahrain)

== Canada ==
- Ayah Bdeir (CEO of littleBits)
- Dr. Fouad Mohammad, Ph.D.
- Maha Shebbani

== China ==
- Ma Haide (1910–1988) (doctor credited with eradication of leprosy and many venereal diseases in China, first foreigner granted citizenship in the People's Republic of China, did clinical training at AUB)

== Eritrea ==
- Beyene Haile, (Writer, public administrator, and founder of the Eritrean Center for Organizational Excellence)

== Germany ==
- Brigitta Siefker-Eberle (ambassador to Jordan and former ambassador to Lebanon)

== Iran ==
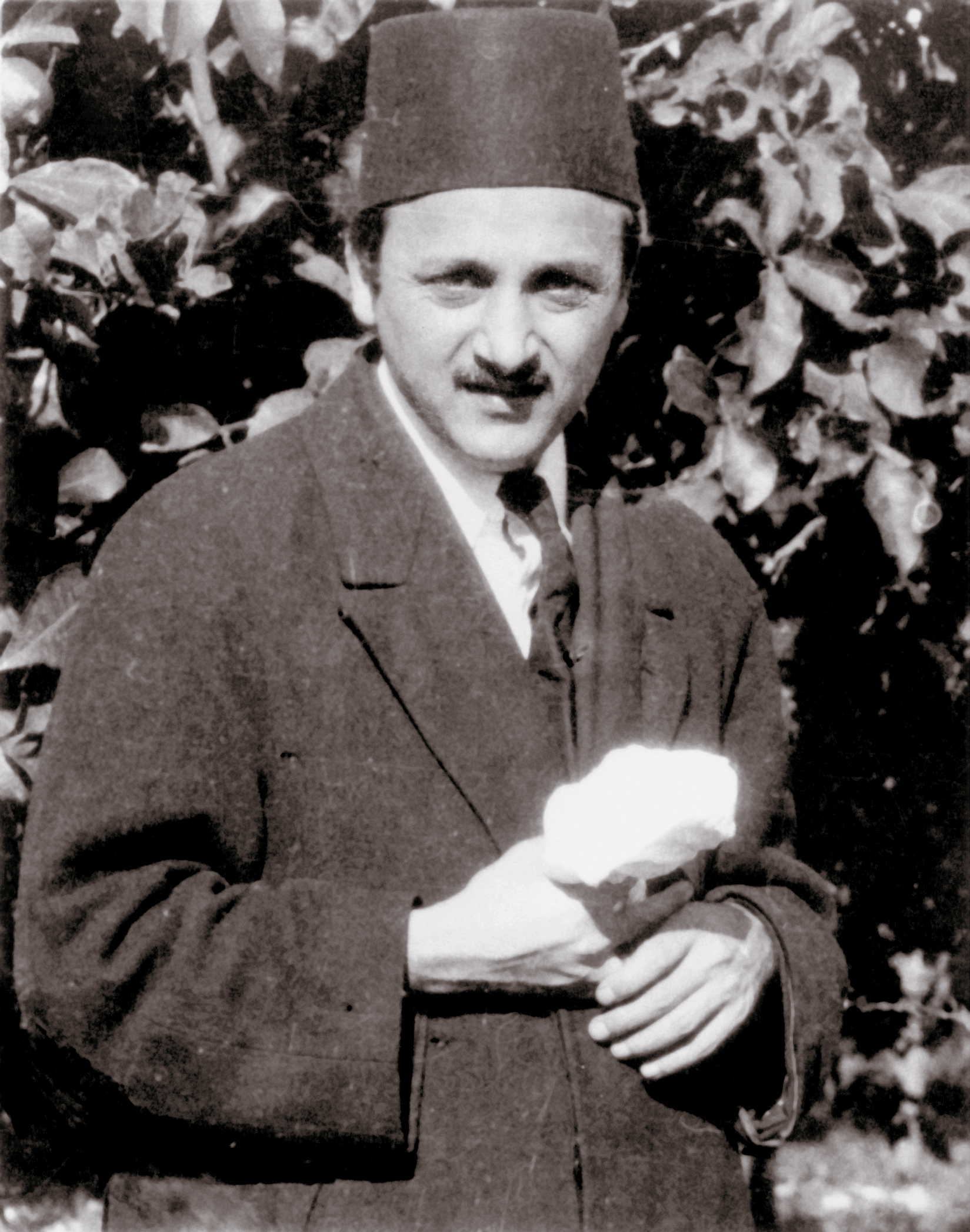
Shoghi Effendi, Guardian of the Bahá’í Faith

- Shoghi Effendi Rabbani (Guardian of the Baháʼí Faith 1921–1957)
- Ali Akbar Salehi (former foreign minister, currently head of the Iran Nuclear Agency)
- Sayyed Mahmoud Hessaby (Iranian scientist)
- Abu'l-Qásim Faizi, Hand of the Cause in the Baháʼí Faith

== Iraq ==
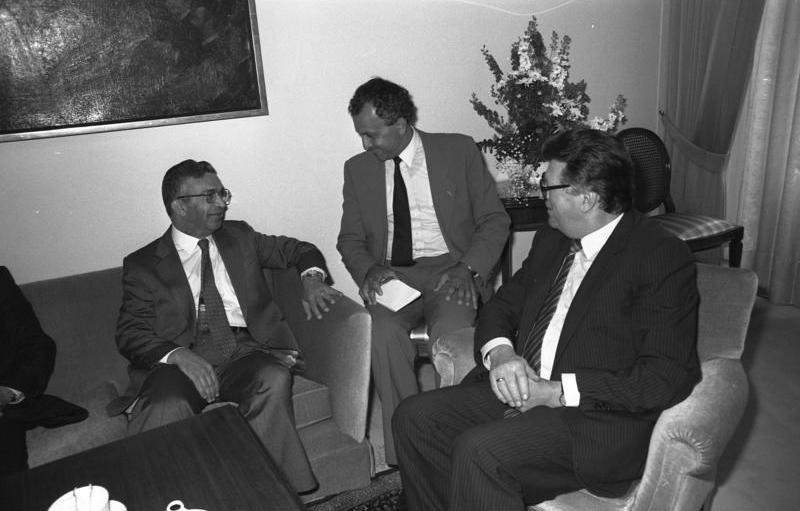
AUB Alumni and former Prime Minister of Iraq Sa'dun Hammadi

- Abdul-Jabbar Abdullah (scientist and academic, the second president of the University of Baghdad)
- Abdulahad AbdulNour (physician and politician)
- Mohammed Tawfiq Allawi (minister of communications)
- Fadhil Al-Jamali (prime minister)
- Adnan Al-Pachachi (foreign minister and president/member of the Interim Ruling Council)
- Matti Aqrawi (academic, the first president of the University of Baghdad)
- Ali Al-Wardi (anthropologist and social historian)
- Taha Baqir (archaeologist and scholar)
- Zaha Hadid (first woman to receive the Pritzker Architecture Prize)
- Saadun Hammadi (prime minister and speaker)

== Israelis (Mandatory Palestine) ==
- Menachem Avidom (1908–1995), Israeli composer
- Gabriel Baer (1919–1982), Israeli historian of the Middle East and Islam
- Yehuda Cohen (1914–2009), Israeli judge of the Supreme Court of Israel
- Eliyahu Eilat (1903–1990), Israeli diplomat and orientalist, ambassador of Israel to the US and the United Kingdom; president of the Hebrew University of Jerusalem
- Natan Panz (1917–1948), Jewish football player from Mandatory Palestine

== Japan ==
- Shigeru Endo (diplomat) Japanese page) (born 1945), (ambassador to Tunisia and Saudi Arabia)
- Mei Shigenobu (born 1973)

== Jordan ==
- Zuheir A. Malhas, MD (minister of health)
- Hussein Fakhri Al-Khalidi (prime minister)
- Suleiman Nabulsi (prime minister from 1956 to 1957)
- Wasfi Al-Tall (prime minister)
- Abdul Hamid Sharaf (prime minister)
- Ahmad Touqan (prime minister)
- Abdul Raouf Al-Rawabdeh (prime minister)
- Abdullah Al-Nsour (prime minister)
- Makhluf Haddadin (chemist, co-discoverer of Davis–Beirut reaction)
- Rima Khalaf (deputy prime minister, minister of finance, and senior UN official)
- Riad al Khouri (economist; former dean of the business school, Lebanese French University, Iraq; currently member of the board of directors, Global Challenges Forum, Switzerland)
- Mohammad Salameh Al Nabulsi (Minister of Youth)
- Leila Najjar-Sharaf (second woman minister and current member of the Upper House "Majlis Al-A'yan")
- Kadri Touqan (foreign minister and academic)
- Umayya Touqan (finance minister, and former governor of the Central Bank of Jordan)
- Akram Zu'eiter (foreign minister, ambassador and writer)
- Abdul Hamid Shoman (former chairman of Arab Bank)
- Samih Darwazah (founder of Hikma Pharmaceuticals, one of the United Kingdom's largest pharmaceutical businesses)
- Talal Abu-Ghazaleh (founder of Talal Abu-Ghazaleh Organization)
- Khaled Touqan (minister of higher education and scientific research and chairman of Jordan Atomic Energy Commission)
- Ja'afar Tuqan (architect)
- Laith Shubeilat (politician)
- Maha Khatib (tourism minister)
- Saleh Burgan (doctor, MP, minister of health and labor and assistant director general of I.L.O.)
- Farid Yaghnam (plastic surgeon)

== Kuwait ==
- Nabeela Abdulla Al Mulla B.A. (1968) and M.A. (1972), diplomat
- Abdul Rahman Al Awadhi (former minister of health)
- Ahmad Al Khatib (one of the earliest parliamentarians)
- Abdullah Al Nafisi (a politician and academic)
- Rula Dashti (Cabinet minister – one of the first four women members of Parliament – Transferred to California State University – Chico during the Lebanese War)

== Lebanon ==
- Abdallah Bou Habib (foreign minister, Ambassador to the U.S.)
- Gebran Bassil (minister of energy)
- Saleh Barakat (art curator)
- Nazih El-Bizri (minister in several Lebanese cabinets and long-serving member of parliament; also physician)
- Lucien Dahdah (economist)
- Bassel Fleihan (minister of economy, assassinated in 2005))
- Anis Freiha (author)
- Ghada El-Hajj Fuleihan (medical doctor, professor, researcher)
- Samir Geagea (born 1952) (Lebanese leader and politician)
- Bilal Hamad (former mayor of Beirut)
- Maan Hamadeh (pianist-composer, musician)
- Wafaa Dikhah Hamze (one of Lebanon's first two women ministers)
- Ali A Haydar (Lebanese physician)
- Philip Khuri Hitti (historian)
- Salim Al-Hoss (prime minister)
- Walid Jumblat (leader of the Progressive Socialist Party, member of parliament and former cabinet minister)
- Wadad Kadi (established Avalon Distinguished Professor of Islamic Studies, University of Chicago)
- Nadim Karam (artist)
- Salim Bey Karam (minister)
- Angela Jurdak Khoury (Lebanon's first woman diplomat)
- Nazem El Khoury (minister of environment)
- Vera El Khoury Lacoeuilhe (diplomat and lecturer)
- Charles Malik (philosopher, key drafter of Universal Declaration of Human Rights, former president of the UN General Assembly; president of the UN Economic and Social Council; Foreign Minister of Lebanon)
- Rouba Mhaissen (activist and economist)
- Najib Mikati (prime minister, billionaire and co-founder of Investcom)
- Aya Mouallem (co-founder, co-director, and board advisory member of All Girls Code)
- Emily Nasrallah (writer and women's rights activist)
- Adel Osseiran (founding figure of modern Lebanon; Speaker of Parliament and Cabinet Minister)
- Ahmad Qamaruddun (mayor of Tripoli)
- Hassan Kamel Al-Sabbah (engineer, mathematician and inventor)
- Manal Abdel Samad (politician)
- Walid Sadek (artist and writer)
- Iskandar Safa (billionaire French Lebanese CEO of P.I. Dev SAL)
- Dalal Khalil Safadi (writer)
- Mohammad Safadi (minister of finance)
- Edvick Jureidini Shayboub (activist, educator and journalist)
- Riad Salameh (governor of the Central Bank of Lebanon)
- Kamal Salibi (Historian)
- Fawzi Salloukh (diplomat and politician)
- Fouad Siniora (prime minister)
- Hamed Sinno (lead singer, Mashrou' Leila)
- Ghassan Tueni (journalist and publisher of An-Nahar newspaper)
- Pierre Zalloua (biologist)
- Huda Zoghbi (professor of pediatrics, molecular and human genetics, and neurology and neuroscience at Baylor College of Medicine. Her work has helped uncover genes and mechanisms responsible for Rett syndrome and spinocerebellar ataxia neurological disorders)
- Alfred Tarazi (artist)

== Malaysia ==
- Mohamad Noah bin Omar (first speaker of Malaysian Parliament [Dewan Rakyat], also the father-in-law of the second and third prime minister of Malaysia)

== The Maldives ==
- Mohamed Waheed Hassan (president of The Maldives – appointed in 2013 when President Mohamed Nasheed resigned)
- Abdulla Yameen (president of The Maldives – elected in 2013)
- Ibrahim Naeem (auditor general of The Maldives)
- Zahiya Zareer (minister of education of The Maldives – held office from 2005 to 2008; high commissioner of Maldives for Sri Lanka (2013))
- Aishath Mohamed Didi (minister of gender and family of The Maldives – held office from 2005 to 2008)

== Palestine ==
- Haidar Abdul-Shafi (Gaza politician and physician)
- Lina Abu Akleh (human rights advocate)
- Salma Al-Khadra Al-Jayyusi (academic and poet)
- Suad Amiry (writer and architect)
- Hanan Ashrawi (academic and politician)
- Gabi Baramki (former president of Bir Zeit University)
- Mohammed Dajani Daoudi (professor and peace activist)
- Salam Fayyad (prime minister of the Palestinian authority)
- George Habash (physician and politician – leader of the Popular Front for the Liberation of Palestine)
- Wadie Haddad (physician and leader of the Popular Front for the Liberation of Palestine’s armed wing)
- Khalil Hindi (current president of Bir Zeit University)
- Marwan Awartani (current president of Palestine Technical University and mathematician)
- Nabeel Kassis (nuclear physicist and politician)
- Said Khoury (entrepreneur and philanthropist – one of the three founders of Consolidated Contractors Company (CCC))
- Hanna Nasser (founding president of Birzeit University)
- Kamal Nasser (famous poet, political leader and member of the Jordanian Parliament)
- Munir H. Nayfeh (professor of particle physics)
- Raja Shehadeh (Orwell Prize-winning author and lawyer)
- Hasib Sabbagh (businessman, activist, and philanthropist – one of the three founders of Consolidated Contractors Company (CCC))
- Ahmad Shukeiri (the first chairman of the Palestine Liberation Organization)
- Ibrahim Touqan (poet)
- Leila Khaled (member of the Popular Front for the Liberation of Palestine and airplane hijacker)

== Saudi Arabia ==
- Aziz Diya (writer, critic, translator, journalist, and broadcaster)
- Abdullah Jum'ah (former president, director, and CEO of Saudi Aramco)
- Omar al-Saqqaf – (former minister of foreign affairs)
- Farida Al-Sulayman (first Saudi woman medical doctor)

== Somaliland ==
- Ubah Ali (activist opposing female genital mutilation)

== Sudan ==
- Ismail al-Azhari (1900–1969), (first president of independent Sudan)

== Syria ==
- Mary Ajami (journalist and writer)
- Nazim al-Qudsi (president and prime minister)
- Fares al-Khoury (prime minister and Speaker of the House)
- Mansur al-Atrash (head of the National Revolutionary Council 1965–1966)
- Abdel Rahman Ash-Shahbandar (Physician, nationalist leader and minister)
- Madani al-Khiyami (health minister and physician)
- Ghada al-Samman (novelist and writer)
- Omar Abu Rishah (ambassador and poet)
- Ignatius IV of Antioch (patriarch of the Greek Orthodox Church of Antioch between July 1979 and December 2012)
- Hassaan Mureiwid (foreign minister)
- Raoul Gregory Vitale (musicologist)
- Constantin Zureiq (academic and historian)

== United States ==
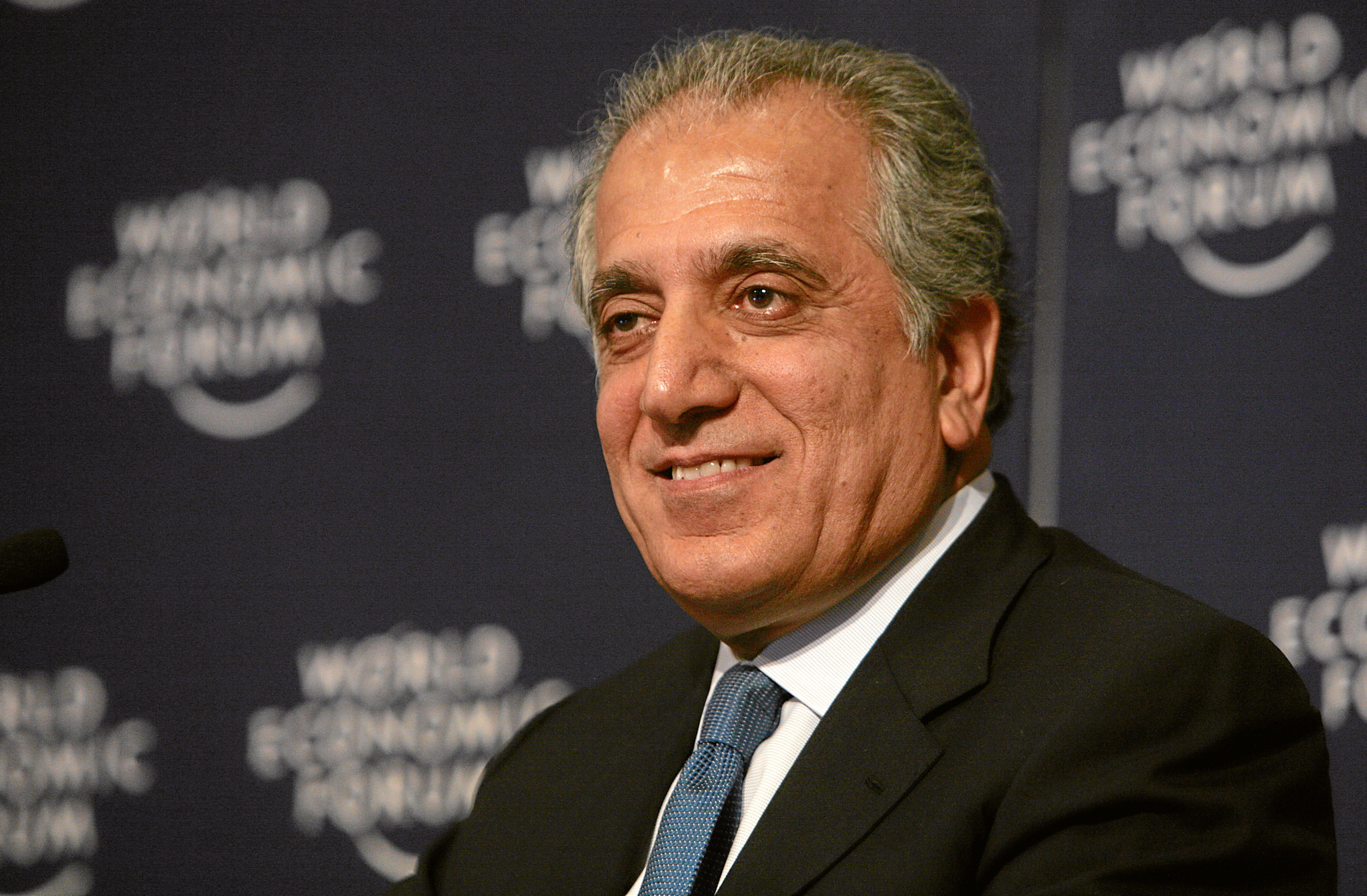
AUB alumni and American ambassador Zalmay Khalilzad at the World Economic Forum

- Ismail al-Faruqi (philosopher and Islamic scholar)
- Osama Abi-Mershed (director, Center for Contemporary Arab Studies, Georgetown University)
- Zayn Alexander (filmmaker)
- Miles Copeland III (manager of The Police)
- Jawad Fares (researcher at Northwestern University)
- Yusuf Hannun (director, Stony Brook University School of Medicine Cancer Center, vice dean for cancer medicine)
- Charles W Hostler (former American ambassador to Bahrain)
- Ray Irani (chairman and CEO, Occidental Petroleum)
- Malcolm H. Kerr (academic, former president of AUB, former professor at UCLA)
- Zalmay Khalilzad (former American ambassador to the United Nations and Afghanistan)
- Lina M. Obeid (dean for research, professor of medicine at Stony Brook School of Medicine)
- Hassan Kamel Al-Sabbah (mathematician, inventor, and electrical engineer)
- Farid Hourani (author, physician, academic)
- Herant Katchadourian (psychiatrist, Stanford University; former president of the Flora Family Foundation; former dean of undergraduate studies and vice provost of undergraduate education, Stanford University)
- Tony Nader (international leader of the Transcendental Meditation movement, neuro-scientist, researcher, university president, author)
- Hagop Panossian (aerospace engineer, academic and philanthropist)
- Viviane Tabar, American neurosurgeon

== Yemen ==
- Farea Al-Muslim (activist)
- Mohammed Abobakr (Researcher)
