= Maurizio Del Poeta =

American lipid and cancer researcher

- Born: Maurizio Del Poeta; February 2, 1966 (age 60); Macerata, Italy
- Education: University of Ancona
- Occupation: Medical researcher
- Known for: Fungal pathogenesis, sphingolipids, antifungal drug design
- Scientific career
- Workplaces: Stony Brook University

Maurizio Del Poeta is a Distinguished Professor in the Department of Microbiology and Immunology at the Stony Brook University Renaissance School of Medicine. His research focuses on novel anti-fungal drug discovery and lipid-mediated fungal pathogenesis.

== Early life ==
Maurizio Del Poeta was born in Macerata, Italy, of Italian parents, Celsa Foglia and Pierino Del Poeta. He conducted his early education at the Liceo Scientifico Galileo Galilei in Macerata and earned a Bachelor of Science in 1984. Following his undergraduate degree, Del Poeta was accepted into the School of Medicine at the University of Ancona, obtaining an MD with Honors in 1992. He then completed his internship and residency in internal medicine at the University of Ancona in 1994. In August 1995, Del Poeta left Italy to take up specialty training at Duke University with a fellowship in infectious disease, as well as undergoing post-doctoral training in the Division of Infectious Diseases under Professor John Perfect in the area of fungal pathogenesis.

== Discovery of sphingolipid-mediated fungal pathogenesis ==
While performing his training at Duke University, Del Poeta initiated a collaboration with Yusuf Hannun and Lina Obeid, both of whom were established experts in sphingolipid signaling. In 1998, Hannun moved to the Medical University of South Carolina (MUSC) to be Chair of Biochemistry and Molecular Biology, and subsequently recruited Del Poeta as an Assistant Professor in his department in 1999. During these initial years at MUSC, Del Poeta made the pivotal discovery that fungal sphingolipids were essential for microbial pathogenesis, two concepts that were previously thought to be disparate. Successive work by his laboratory in this new field of study identified new anti-fungal targets for the research and development of new anti-fungal drugs. Notably, the linking of the sphingolipid glucosylceramide to fungal pathogenicity pioneered a new road for the testing of this molecule as an immunomodulator not only against infection but also against cancer. In 2003, while at MUSC, Del Poeta was elected a Burroughs Wellcome New Investigator in Pathogenesis of Infectious Diseases. Following this award, Del Poeta was later promoted to Associate Professor with tenure in 2006 and to full Professor with tenure in 2011.

== Subsequent career ==
In 2012, Del Poeta was recruited by the Department of Microbiology and Immunology at Stony Brook University to continue his research program on the study of lipids, metabolism, and imaging in Infectious Diseases with a focus on pathogenic fungal infections. Under his leadership, the infectious disease research and care at Stony Brook has expanded, including the establishment of a new lipidomics and metabolomics core facility to collect and analyze biological data at the University.

Soon after his arrival to Stony Brook University, Del Poeta engaged with the Center of Biotechnology and through their entrepreneurship-in-residency program, he co-founded MicroRid Technologies Inc. with John B. McCarthy and John Mallamo, a start-up company that has the primary goal to research and develop new classes of anti-fungal compounds. The research from this company helps to advance infectious disease research and rapidly translate basic research findings into new clinical tools and immunotherapies.

== Research contributions, honors, and awards ==
In the field of bioactive sphingolipids, Del Poeta has contributed over 130 academic primary research and review articles, published several book chapters, and co-edited a book on sphingolipid signaling. In 2007, he was elected into the American Society for Clinical Investigation, and in 2016 into the Association of American Physicians. In 2020, Del Poeta was elected in the American Academy for Microbiology. In 2021, Del Poeta was named a Distinguished professor by the SUNY system, a prestigious award that recognizes faculty who epitomize excellence in their profession, and in doing so, distinguish themselves and honor SUNY. In 2023, Dr. Del Poeta was inducted into the National Academy of Inventors.

== Personal life ==
While at Duke University, Del Poeta met his wife Chiara Luberto, a fellow scientist and biomedical researcher who also made seminal contributions to the sphingolipid field. Both Del Poeta and Dr. Luberto hold professorships at Stony Brook University, and they have two sons.

“It’s 3 o’clock in Italy.” - Maurizio Del Poeta
