= Word of mouth =

Passing information orally from person to person

Word of mouth is the passing of information from person to person using oral communication, which could be as simple as telling someone the time of day. Storytelling is a common form of word-of-mouth communication where one person tells others a story about a real event or something made up. Oral tradition is cultural material and traditions transmitted by word of mouth through successive generations. Storytelling and oral tradition are forms of word of mouth that play important roles in folklore and mythology. Another example of oral communication is oral history—the recording, preservation and interpretation of historical information, based on the personal experiences and opinions of the speaker. Oral history preservation is the field that deals with the care and upkeep of oral history materials collected by word of mouth, whatever format they may be in.

== Storytelling ==
Storytelling often involves improvisation or embellishment. Stories or narratives have been shared in every culture as a means of entertainment, education, cultural preservation and in order to instill moral values.

The earliest forms of storytelling were thought to have been primarily oral combined with gesture storytelling for many of the ancient cultures. The Australian Aboriginal people painted symbols from stories on cave walls as a means of helping the storyteller remember the story. The story was then told using a combination of oral narrative, music, rock art, and dance.

Traditionally, oral stories were committed to memory and then passed from generation to generation. However, in literate societies, written, televised, and internet media have largely replaced this method of communicating local, family, and cultural histories. Oral storytelling remains the dominant medium of learning in some countries with low literacy rates.

== Oral tradition ==
Oral tradition (sometimes referred to as "oral culture" or "oral lore") is cultural material and traditions transmitted orally from one generation to another. The messages or testimony are verbally transmitted in speech or song and may take the form, for example, of folktales, sayings, ballads, songs, or chants. In this way, it is possible for a society to transmit oral history, oral literature, oral law and other knowledges across generations without a writing system.

Sociologists emphasize a requirement that the material is held in common by a group of people, over several generations, and thus distinguish oral tradition from testimony or oral history. In a general sense, "oral tradition" refers to the transmission of cultural material through vocal utterance, and was long held to be a key descriptor of folklore (a criterion no longer rigidly held by all folklorists). As an academic discipline, it refers both to a set of objects of study and a method by which they are studied—the method may be called variously "oral traditional theory", "the theory of Oral-Formulaic Composition" and the "Parry-Lord theory" (after two of its founders). The study of oral tradition is distinct from the academic discipline of oral history, which is the recording of personal memories and histories of those who experienced historical eras or events. It is also distinct from the study of orality, which can be defined as thought and its verbal expression in societies where the technologies of literacy (especially writing and print) are unfamiliar to most of the population.

== Oral history ==
Oral history is the recording of personal memories and histories of those who experienced historical eras or events. Oral history is a method of historical documentation, using interviews with living survivors of the time being investigated. Oral history often touches on topics scarcely touched on by written documents, and by doing so, fills in the gaps of records that make up early historical documents. Oral history preservation is the field that deals with the care and upkeep of oral history materials, whatever format they may be in.

== Verbal communication ==
Verbal communication in the literal sense is oral communication with words that a person or other people speak out loud.

== Social media ==
Social media is a form of electronic communication through which users create online communities to share information, ideas, personal messages, and other content (such as videos). Social media involves the way individuals communicate with others online. Social media in itself is not word of mouth, but it is one way that word of mouth spreads. In fact, half of all word of mouth takes place online. Practitioners have started using electronic word of mouth for consumer insight through text analytics, sentiment, hashtag analytics, and other machine learning tools. However, researchers of the Keller Fay Group found discussions are often face-to-face and not primarily dominated by social media. Alluding to offline word of mouth (real life conversations) being just as persuasive as online word of mouth.

Researchers argue that social media itself is not word of mouth, but rather a medium through which word of mouth spreads. Word of mouth is a story or verbal recommendation, as some researchers view social media as a mechanism. Social media is thus a big part of how word of mouth travels between people.

== Systems ==
Long-established systems using word-of-mouth include:

- the "grapevine"
- the salon
- the "bush telegraph"
- the lecture circuit
- preaching

== See also ==
- Electronic word-of-mouth
- Communication
- Klout
- Oral communication
- Oral history
- Oral tradition
- PeerIndex
- Storytelling
- Telephone, an oral communication device
- Telephone, a game
- Train of thought
- Two-step flow of communication
- Walkie-talkie, designed for walking and talking
- Word-of-mouth marketing
