= Davis–Beirut reaction =

Chemical reaction

Named after	University of California, Davis; American University of Beirut
Reaction type	Ring forming reaction

The Davis–Beirut reaction is N,N-bond forming heterocyclization that creates numerous types of 2H-indazoles and indazolones in both acidic and basic conditions The Davis–Beirut reaction is named after Mark Kurth and Makhluf Haddadin's respective universities; University of California, Davis and American University of Beirut, and is appealing because it uses inexpensive starting materials and does not require toxic metals.

Formation of 2H-indazoles by the Davis–Beirut reaction

== Mechanism in base ==
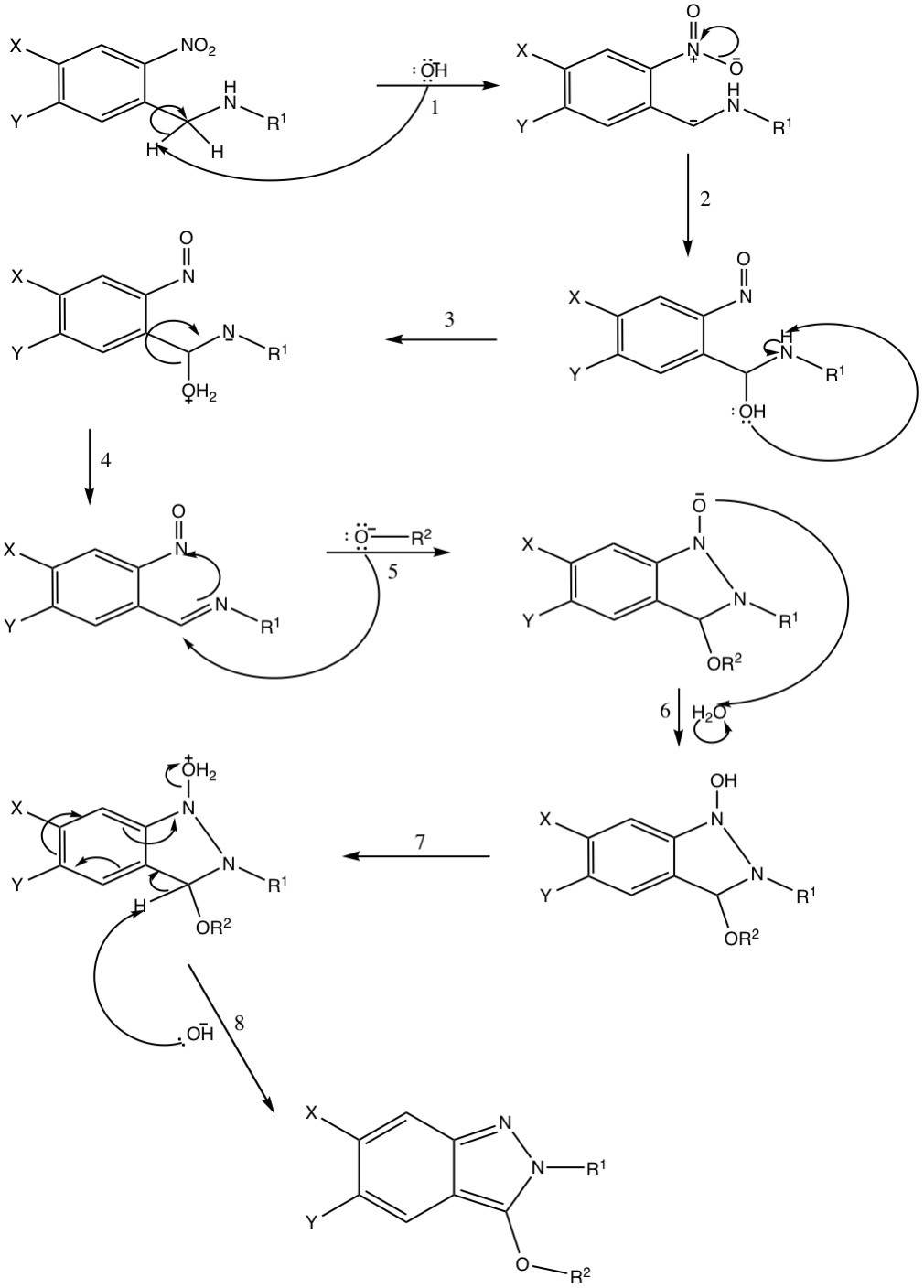
Davis–Beirut 2H-indazoles mechanism

The current proposed mechanism for the Davis–Beirut reaction in base was first published in 2005 by Kurth, Olmstead, and Haddadin. The reaction occurs when a N-substituted 2-nitrobenzylamine is heated in the presence of base, such as NaOH and KOH, and an alcohol and includes the formation of a carbanion The reaction begins with the base removing a hydrogen (1) adjacent to the secondary amine-group, creating a carbanion. The carbanion then extracts an oxygen from the nitro group (2), which is then subsequently protonated, most likely by water. The newly formed hydroxyl group (3), then extracts the secondary amines hydrogen, leaving a negative charge on nitrogen and creating a protonated hydroxyl group. The oxygen and its hydrogens then leave as a molecule of water (4), creating a double bond with the previously negatively charged nitrogen atom. The new pi bond makes the carbon adjacent to the nitrogen more susceptible for attack by a present alcohol (5), which in turn creates an oxygen-carbon bond, a bond between the two nitrogen atoms, and pushes electrons onto the oxygen molecule originally from the amide. This molecule is then protonated (6) to create an overall net neutral charge. The hydroxyl group is protonated similarly to step three (7), creating a good leaving group. Therefore, when the alpha hydrogen of the nitrogen atom and ether group (8) is extracted by the base, the flow of electrons creates two new carbon-nitrogen bonds and causes the loss of the protonated hydroxyl group as a molecule of water. The final product produced by this mechanism is therefore a 3-oxy-substituted 2H-indazole.

Slight variations of this mechanism exists depending on the starting materials and the conditions (acid or base) of the reaction. In instances of intramolecular oxygen attack (i.e. step 5 of the proposed mechanism is intramolecular) an o-nitrobenzylidene imine intermediate is formed compared to the secondary imine of the displayed mechanism.

O-nitrosobenzylidine imine

Furthermore, Davis–Beirut reactions in acids form a carbocation as one of its transition states instead of the proposed carbanion one when the reaction occurs in base.

== Other variants of the Davis–Beirut reaction ==
By manipulating the starting materials of the Davis–Beirut reaction, researchers can create a large number of 2H-indazoles derivatives, many of which can be utilized for further synthesis. In 2014, Thiazolo-, Thiazino-, and Thiazipino-2H-indazoles were synthesized utilizing o-nitrobenzaldehydes or o-nitrobenzyl bromides and S-trityl-protected primary aminothiol alkanes with a base, such as KOH, in alcohol. Creating Thiazolo-, Thiazino-, and Thiazipino-2H-indazoles is beneficial since they are generally more stable than the oxo-2H-indazoles formed without the S-trityl-protected group, and they can easily be oxidized to sulfones.

1H-Indazole example

Creating 2H-indazoles via the Davis–Beirut reaction can also help in producing 1H-indazoles, naturally occurring and synthetically made molecules with known pharmaceutical uses such as anti-inflammatories and anti-cancer drugs. By creating 2H-indazoles via the Davis–Beirut reaction, the product can subsequently be reacted with electrophiles, such as anhydrides, to create disubstituted 1H-indazoles that can be utilized for pharmaceutical and other industrial purposes.

== Applications ==
Heterocycles, especially those containing nitrogen atoms, are highly prevalent in many pharmaceutical drugs currently on the market. Some, like those coming from 1H-indazoles, contain naturally occurring molecules, while others are purly synthetic. 2H-indazoles, though, are very rare in nature compared to 1H-indazole compounds, most likely due to the complex nature of a heterocycle including a nitrogen-nitrogen bond and an ether side chain. The discovery of the Davis–Beirut reaction therefore provides any easy and cost effective way to synthetically create 2H-indazoles. Breakthroughs, including the success of introducing thioether moiety at C3 of the 2H-indazole structure, has aided in creating drug treatments for a variety of ailments, including cystic fibrosis, with the use of myeloperoxidase inhibitors. Due to the recentness of the discovery of this reaction, though, most research is primarily headed by Haddadin, Kurth, or both, therefore causing a currently limited scope.
