= Ghada El-Hajj Fuleihan =

Professor of medicine

Ghada El-Hajj Fuleihan is a professor of medicine, researcher and physician scientist at the American University of Beirut. Prior to that she held the position of founding Director of the Calcium Metabolism Program at Brigham and Women's Hospital. She is also the Bernard Lown Scholar in the Department of Global Health and Population at the Harvard T. H. Chan School of Public Health. In 2022, she became a member of the editorial board of Mayo Clinic Proceedings.

== Education ==
El-Hajj Fuleihan earned her medical degree from the American University of Beirut in 1983. She completed her residency and fellowship training at the New England Deaconess and Brigham and Women's Hospital. She went to Harvard University for her master's degree in public health, which she earned in 1997.

== Career ==
El-Hajj Fuleihan is a professor at the Department of Internal Medicine at the American University of Beirut and is founding director of the Calcium Metabolism and Osteoporosis Program, World Health Organization (WHO) Collaborating Center for Metabolic Bone Disorders, and AUB's Scholars in HeAlth Research Program. Her work entails conducting clinical trails, research, systematic reviews, and meta analysis with the aim of enhancing the understanding of hypovitaminosis D, osteoporosis, and other metabolic bone disorders.

Her research primarily focuses on metabolic bone disorders. This encompasses investigations into the epidemiology, pathophysiology, and treatment of osteoporosis, as well as the impact of hypovitaminosis D on musculoskeletal health. Additionally, she explores women's health issues and the utilization of densitometry measurements. Her work extends to the examination of secondary causes of bone loss, including their underlying mechanisms and treatment options. She studies hyperparathyroidism and investigates how assay variations influence guidelines and medical practices. She directed the establishment and refinement of the blueprint, governance structure, and policies for the AUBMC's Human Research Protection Program and its Clinical Research Institute. Her research focuses on metabolic bone disorders, and she conducts clinical trials and analyses for the formulation of prevention and treatment strategies.

El-Hajj Fuleihan oversees the IOF Middle East Africa osteoporosis audit and leading the National Task Force for Metabolic Bone Disorders, an international non-governmental organization that collaborates with global alliances to enhance awareness, prevention, and care of osteoporosis. She is the guideline committee chair of the Endocrine Society and collaborates with the Lebanese Ministry of Health, ASBMR, WHO, IOF, and ISCD.

== Awards and honors ==
El-Hajj Fuleihan received the Alumni Award from the Harvard T.H. Chan School of Public Health in 2017 in part for her contributions regarding the prevention of osteoporosis and vitamin D deficiency. She was also awarded the John Bilezikian Leadership Award from the International Society of Clinical Densitometry, the Endocrine Society International Excellence in Endocrinology award, and the Harvard T.H. Chan School of Public Health Merit award.

== Selected publications ==
El-Hajj Fuleihan has published in over 190 publications on topics in calcium metabolism, endocrinology, and osteoporosis.

- Ambrish Mithal, Danys A Wahl, J-P Bonjour, Peter Burckhardt, Bess Dawson-Hughes, John A Eisman, Ghada El-Hajj Fuleihan, Robert G Josse, Paul Lips, Jorge Morales-Torres, IOF Committee of Scientific Advisors (CSA) Nutrition Working Group, Global vitamin D status and determinants of hypovitaminosis D, Osteoporosis International 20, 1807–1820, 2009.
- Bess Dawson-Hughes, Ambrish Mithal, J-P Bonjour, Steven Boonen, Peter Burckhardt, Ghada El-Hajj Fuleihan, Robert G. Josse, PTAM Lips, Jorge Morales-Torres, N Yoshimura, IOF position statement: vitamin D recommendations for older adults, Osteoporosis International 21(7), 1151–1145, 2010.
- John P. Bilezikian, John T. Potts Jr, Ghada El-Hajj Fuleihan, Michael Kleerekoper, Robert Neer, Munro Peacock, Jonas Rastad, Shonni J Silverberg, Robert Udelsman, Samuel A Wells, Summary statement from a workshop on asymptomatic primary hyperparathyroidism: a perspective for the 21st century, The Journal of Clinical Endocrinology & Metabolism 87 (12), 5353–5361, 2002.
