= Nabeela Abdulla Al Mulla =

Kuwaiti Diplomat

Nabeela Al Mulla
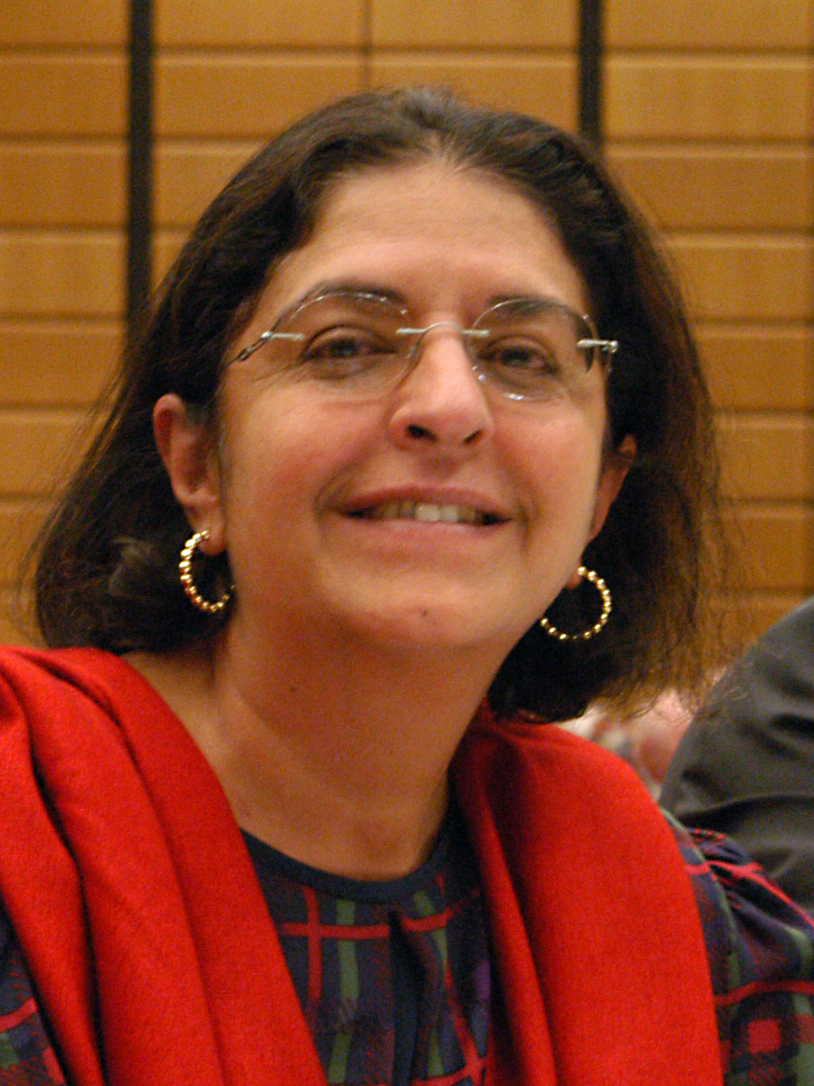
- Al Mulla in 2002
- Other names: H.E. Nabeela Al-Mulla
- Education: American University of Beirut (BA, MA)

Nabeela Abdulla Al Mulla is a Kuwaiti diplomat, scholar, and educator. Al Mulla was the first woman ambassador from Kuwait and the Gulf Cooperation Council. She was also the first woman from the Middle East and South Asia to chair the Board of Governors of the International Atomic Energy Agency in 2002. In 2004, Al Mulla became the first Arab woman to be named Permanent Representative to the United Nations. Throughout her career, Al Mulla has represented Kuwait in diplomatic missions in Belgium, Luxembourg, Austria, Slovenia, Hungary, Slovakia, South Africa, Zimbabwe, Namibia, Mauritius, Botswana, and the Bahamas. She has also represented Kuwait in international organizations such as the United Nations, European Union, and the North Atlantic Treaty Organization. In 2022, she was appointed by the United Nations Secretary General Antonio Guterres as a member of the United Nations' Advisory Board on Disarmament Matters (ABDM).

== Education ==
Al Mulla pursued her studies in international affairs at the American University of Beirut, obtaining her Bachelor of Arts in Political Science in 1968 and Master of Arts in International Relations in 1972, both with distinction.

== Career ==
Al Mulla began her diplomatic career when she joined the Kuwaiti Ministry of Foreign Affairs in 1968 after completing her education. In 1973, she was posted to the United Nations in New York where she represented Kuwait in various committees of the United Nations General Assembly.

In 1993, Al Mulla made history as the first woman from Kuwait and the Gulf Cooperation Council to serve as an ambassador, paving the way for increased representation of women in diplomatic circles in the region. From 1993-1995 Al Mulla was appointed Ambassador Extraordinary and Plenipotentiary to Zimbabwe and non-resident ambassador to South Africa, Namibia, and Botswana. In 1996, she served as ambassador to South Africa and non-resident ambassador to Namibia, Mauritius, and Botswana.

In 2000, Al Mulla was appointed ambassador to Austria, Hungary, Slovakia, and Slovenia, with the latter three countries on a non-residency basis. She was also appointed as Permanent Representative of the State of Kuwait to the United Nations organizations in Vienna. From 2002-2003 she was Chairwoman of the Board of the International Atomic Energy Agency. She also represented Kuwait at the Organization of Petroleum Exporting Countries (OPEC) and the Comprehensive Nuclear Test Ban Treaty Organization.

In 2004, Al Mulla was appointed as the Permanent Representative of Kuwait to the United Nations, becoming the first Arab woman to hold this position.

From 2007-2013, Al Mulla served as ambassador to Belgium and Luxembourg as well as Head of Mission to the European Union and NATO.

Following her retirement from the diplomatic service in 2013, Al Mulla became involved in the academic sector, joining the American University of Kuwait as a distinguished lecturer in 2015 where she teaches a seminar in International Law and Organizations. In 2022, Al Mulla was appointed by the UNSG as a member of the UN Advisory Board on Disarmament Matters and the Board of Trustees of the UN Institute for Disarmament Research (UNDIR) for a period of two years.

== Selected publications ==
- Al-Mulla, Nabeela (2024). "The Quest for Peace: The Peace That Eluded the UN Founders". Horizons: Journal of International Relations and Sustainable Development (26): 24–33. ISSN 2406-0402.
- Al Mulla, Nabeela (2024). Breaking new ground on the global stage. ISBN 9798989118380.

== Awards and honors ==
Over the course of her career, Al Mulla has been the recipient of a number of decorations and awards. In 2004 she was awarded the Austrian Grand Golden Decoration of Honor for First Class Merit for her work with the IAEA during the Korean and Iranian crises. Al Mulla also received the Order of the Crown (Belgium) in 2013 and the SOS Children's Villages Badge of Honor in Gold in 2014.
