= Vera El Khoury Lacoeuilhe =

Lebanese diplomat and lecturer

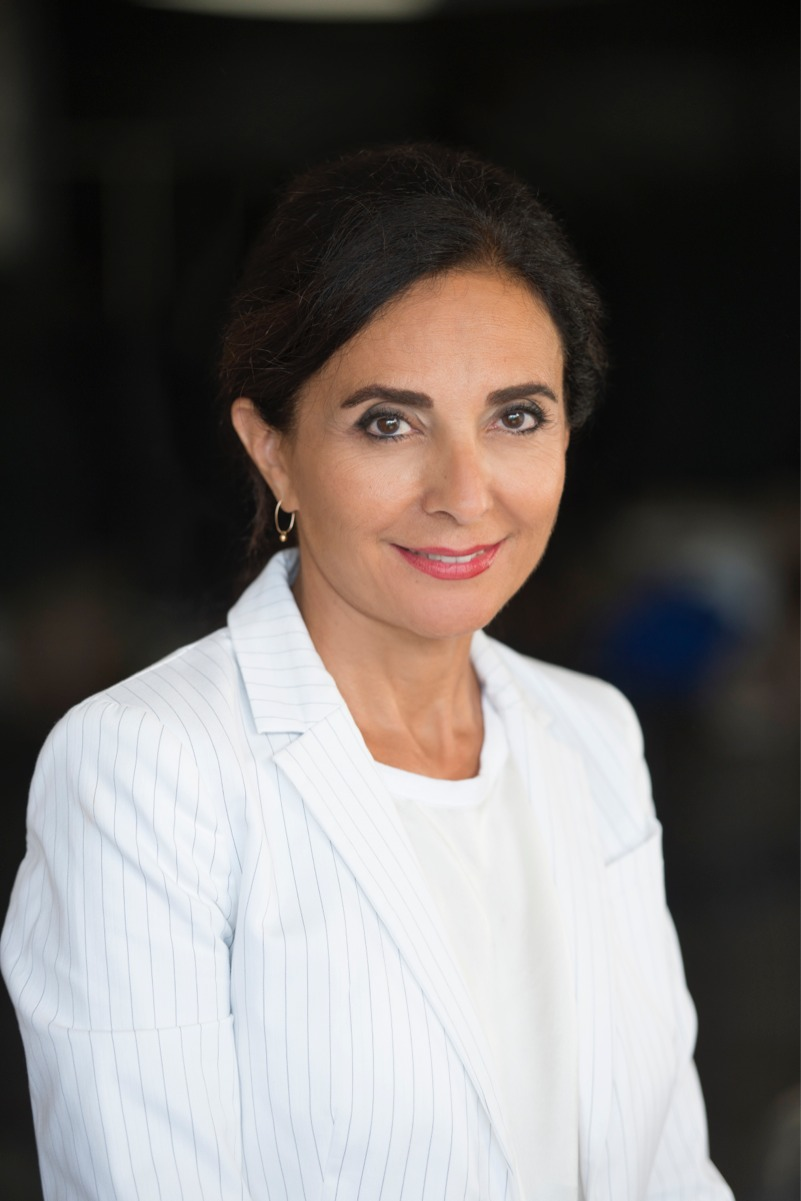
Vera El Khoury Lacoeuilhe

Vera El Khoury Lacoeuilhe is a Lebanese-born diplomat and lecturer in international law.

She is an advisor to the Lebanese Ministry of Culture and member of the “Independent Team of Advisors” (ITA) set up by the United Nations Economic and Social Council (ECOSOC). She is a lecturer in international law at the Sorbonne School of Law in Paris.

== Early life and education ==
Vera El Khoury Lacoeuilhe was born in Beirut in 1959 and was the first child of Georges and Elham El Khoury. She obtained a bachelor's degree in political science, from the American University of Beirut. She holds a master's degree in near eastern affairs from the New York University. She is fluent in Arabic, English and French.

== Career ==
El Khoury Lacoeuilhe is an advisor to the Lebanese Ministry of Culture and member of the “Independent Team of Advisors” (ITA) set up by the United Nations Economic and Social Council (ECOSOC). She is a lecturer in international Law at the Sorbonne School of Law in Paris, Department of International and European Studies, Master 2 level Seminar entitled "International Institutions and Organizations".

Prior to that, she had embraced a diplomatic career from 1996.

She was deputy permanent delegate of Saint Lucia to UNESCO and the Alternate Representative of the Government of Saint Lucia to the Organisation Internationale de la Francophonie from 2001 to 2016

She rapidly played important roles in the General Conference such as Chairperson of the Joint Commission, Administrative and Program (1999), President of the Group on the Right to Vote (2003), Vice Chairperson of the Administrative Commission (1999-2001; 2013).

She also played important roles in the Executive Board of UNESCO such as Chairperson of the Group of Experts on Finance and Administration Matters (2000-2001), Chairperson of the Group on the introduction of the Euro (2001), President of the Ad Hoc Group on the Independent External Evaluation of UNESCO (IEE) (2009-2010) and Chairperson of the Preparatory Group (2012-2013).

She was elected Chairperson of many working groups/committees including on the reform of the General Conference and the Executive Board of UNESCO. She chaired the 27th session (2003) and was the Vice-Chair of the 28th session (2004), of the World Heritage Committee She also chaired the 1st Extraordinary General Assembly (2014) of the World Heritage Convention. She was nominated to chair the Committee on the Protection and Promotion of the Diversity of Cultural Expressions(2009).

She chaired the Drafting group of the International Convention against Doping in Sport (2003) and the Intergovernmental Meeting of Experts for the negotiation of the Recommendation on the "Historic Urban Landscape» (2011).

She was head of the Delegation to the Global Education for All Meeting (GEM) in Muscat, Oman (2014).

== UNESCO Director-General candidacy ==
In March 2016, El Khoury Lacoeuilhe was officially nominated as Lebanon's candidate for the position of Director-General of UNESCO. There were nine candidates for this post. All were interviewed during the 201st Board session on 26 and 27 April 2017 and received press coverage from various international newspapers.

== Distinctions ==
El Khoury Lacoeuilhe received awards including:

- Knight of the National Order of Merit (France) - Chevalier de l'Ordre national du Mérite (November 2005).
- Insignia of the Order of Vytautas the Great (Lithuania) - Vytauto Didžiojo ordino medalis President of the Republic of Lithuania (June 2005).

== Personal life ==
El Khoury Lacoeuilhe is married and has two grown up children.
