= Rouba Mhaissen =

Syrian-Lebanese economist and activist

- Born: Beirut, Lebanon
- Education: American University of Beirut (B.A.); London School of Economics (M.A.); SOAS University of London (PhD)
- Occupations: Economist, activist
- Awards: DVF Award (2021)

Rouba Mhaissen (born 1987/1988) is a Syrian-Lebanese economist and activist. She is the founder of Sawa for Development and Aid, a grassroots organization which serves Syrian refugees in Lebanon, and the British-based Sawa Foundation.

== Early life and education ==
Mhaissen was born in Beirut. She has two brothers and a sister, of whom she is ten years younger. Her mother was a Lebanese homemaker, while her father was a Syrian businessman. As a child she frequently visited Syria to see family.

She attended the American University of Beirut, earning a degree in economics, and then the London School of Economics, where she earned a master's degree in development studies. She was persuaded to study economics by her parents, rather than to pursue her love of theater. She also holds a PhD in gender and development from the School of Oriental and African Studies at the University of London.

== Activism ==
In 2006, Mhaissen worked with Palestinian refugees in Lebanon; in later years, she worked with Lebanese refugees in Syria.

In December 2011, Mhaissen founded Sawa for Development and Aid. The organization provides support related for basic needs to Syrian refugees in the Beqaa Valley, such as shelter, blankets, and food. It also organizes workshops to educate refugee women.

Mhaissen has promoted grassroots activism over international aid efforts.

== Awards and recognition ==
In 2016, Mhaissen received the Marsh Award for Peacemaking and Peacekeeping from the British Foreign and Commonwealth Office.

In 2017 she was named on Forbes 30 Under 30 list of the most influential people in Policy and Law.

In 2019 she was given the Vital Voices Global Leadership Award, and the Rafto Prize “for defending human rights from the local to the global level for people living as refugees”.

In 2021 she was given a DVF Award.

== Personal life ==
Mhaissen is married and has three children.
