= Herant Katchadourian =

American academic (born 1933)

Herant A. Katchadourian
- Born: January 23, 1933; İskenderun, Turkey
- Occupations: Psychiatrist, professor
- Years active: 1964–2008
- Spouse: Stina Lindfors (m. 1964)

‘’’Herant A. Katchadourian’’’ (born January 23, 1933) is an Armenian-American psychiatrist and professor. He was born in Turkey and raised in Beirut. He was a Dean at Stanford University, and a Professor of Human Biology. He became renowned in the late 20th Century as an pioneering author and instructor of human sexuality. In later life, he served as trustee of many organizations. He is the father of artist Nina Katchadourian.

== Early life ==
Herant Aram Katchadourian was born on January 23, 1933, in İskenderun, Turkey. His parents were Aram Adour and Efronia (Nazarian) Katchadourian. He earned a Bachelor’s degree at the American University of Beirut in 1954, and a Doctor of Medicine, also from American University, Beirut, in 1958. He did postgraduate work in psychiatry at the University of Rochester, finishing in 1961. He is fluent in five languages. Katchadourian immigrated to the United States in 1958. He was naturalized as a citizen in 1972.

== Career ==
Katchadourian arrived at Stanford University in 1966. He became a professor of psychiatry and behavioral sciences as well as human biology. He also served as university ombudsman, vice provost, and dean of undergraduate studies.

In 1968, Katchadourian began teaching Stanford’s class in Human Sexuality, Human Biology 10. It became known as “the most heavily subscribed class in the history of the university”; over 20,000 students took the course before Katchadourian stopped teaching it in 2002. At its peak, one-quarter of Stanford’s undergraduate students were enrolled in the class.

As time passed, the scope of the course expanded to include additional topics such as sexual orientation, sexually-transmissible diseases, date rape, and harassment. Katchadourian wrote and subsequently expanded the textbook, ‘’Fundamentals of Human Sexuality’’, which went through numerous editions and revisions.

Katchadourian became a trustee of his ‘’alma mater’’, American University of Beirut, in 2001, retiring in 2008. He was also a trustee of Haigazian University, a trustee of the William and Flora Hewlett Foundation, and president of the Flora Family Foundation..

== Personal life ==
Katchadourian married Stina Lindfors, a literary translator and writer from Finland, in 1964. They have two children, Nina and Kai.

== Bibliography ==
Works by Katchadourian include:

- ’’Fundamentals of Human Sexuality’’ (1972)
- ’’Human Sexuality: Sense and Nonsense’’ (1974)
- ’’Biological Aspects of Human Sexuality’’ (1975)
- ’’The Biology of Adolescence’’ (1977)
- ’’Human Sexuality: A Comparative and Developmental Perspective’’ (1979)
- ’’La sexualidad humana: un estudio comparativo de su evolución’’ (1983)
- ’’Careerism and Intellectualism Among College Students’’ (Jossey Bass Higher and Adult Education Series) (1985)
- ’’Midlife in perspective: 50’’ (1986)
- ’’Cream of the Crop: The Impact of Elite Education in the Decade After College’’ (1994)
- ’’The Developing Adult: Biological & Psychosocial Perspectives’’ (1996)
- ’’Guilt: The Bite of Conscience’’ (2009)
- ’’The Way It Turned Out: A Memoir’’ (2012)
