= Ali T. Taher =

Lebanese hematologist

- علي طاهر
- Ali T. Taher | MD, PhD, FRCP
- Born: Lebanon
- Occupations: Hematologist, Physician-Scientist, and Tenured Professor
- Known for: Being listed among the world's top 2% of scholars in his respective field, and significantly contributed to Phase I–IV clinical trials.
- Title: MD, PhD, FRCP.

Academic background
- Education: American University of Beirut; Leiden University Medical Center

Academic work
- Discipline: Hematology
- Sub-discipline: Benign hematological disorders, Thalassemia, Thalassemia, Sickle Cell Disease, Thrombosis, Bleeding, Anemia
- Institutions: American University of Beirut Medical Center, American University of Beirut, Emory School of Medicine, University of Milan
- Website: https://www.aub.edu.lb/Pages/profile.aspx?memberid=ataher

Ali T. Taher is a prominent Lebanese hematologist and clinician-scientist whose work focuses on benign hemoglobinopathies, particularly thalassemia and sickle cell disease. His work has helped advance both clinical care and research in the hematology field.

He holds several leadership roles at the American University of Beirut (AUB) and American University of Beirut Medical Center (AUBMC). He also is an active member of leading hematology societies.

He has an H-index of 86, published more than 500 peer-reviewed publications in leading international journals related to anemia and hematology. In November 2020, Taher was recognized and placed in the World's top 2% of scholars in his respective field. A year later he was listed among the top 0.1% of scholars writing about Anemia over the past 10 years by Expertscape's PubMed-based algorithms.

He has been invited to over 200 conferences both regionally and internationally as a keynote speaker, chairperson and moderator. In addition he has received several awards, including the European Hematology Association Education and Mentoring Award, the Kuwait Foundation for the Advancement of Sciences Prize, and Lebanon's National Cedar Medal.

Taher is also the Director of the Naef K. Basile Cancer Institute (NKBCI) at the American University of Beirut Medical Center (AUBMC).

== Education ==
Ali T. Taher earned a Bachelor of Science (B.S.) degree in Biology in 1982, and a Medical Degree (M.D.) degree in 1986 from the American University of Beirut (AUB), where he also completed a residency in Internal Medicine (1987–1989) and a fellowship in Hematology/Oncology at AUBMC (1989–1991). He later pursued a clinical fellowship at The Royal Free Hospital in London from 1991 to 1993 and obtained a Philosophy Degree (Ph.D.) from Leiden University Medical Center (LUMC) in 2012 for his research on thalassemia.

== Roles ==
Taher is a Tenured Professor of Medicine at the American University of Beirut (AUB). He also holds several administrative roles, including Director of the Naef K. Basile Cancer Institute, Vice Chair for Research in the Department of Internal Medicine, and Associate Vice President for Academic Centers, Development and External Affairs (since July 2024). He also serves as a Consultant at the Chronic Care Center – Thalassemia Department in Lebanon. Internationally, he holds academic appointments as Adjunct Professor at Emory School of Medicine and Visiting Professor at the University of Milan.

According to AUB's Benign Blood Clinic profile, Taher's clinical subspecialty is benign hematology, with experience in treating a wide array of benign blood disorders—including thalassemia, sickle cell disease, bleeding disorders, thrombosis, and hemostasis.

Taher is a member of the Lebanese Society of Medical Oncology. He is also a consultant for the Ministry of Health since 2002.

== Research ==
Taher's research focuses on thalassemia and related disorders. His work has addressed complications associated with thalassemia intermedia, the use of iron chelation therapy in thalassemia major and intermedia, and therapies aimed at increasing hemoglobin production.

In 2025, Taher led a global phase 3 trial of mitapivat, a potential oral treatment for non-transfusion-dependent thalassemia (NTDT). The trail was conducted at the American University of Beirut and the Chronic Care Center in Lebanon. The drug is currently under review by the United States Food and Drug Administration.

In 2021, The New England Journal of Medicine published a review on β-thalassemia co-authored by Taher, the first in 15 years to focus on the condition.

== Recognition ==
Taher has received numerous national and international awards for his work. In 2022, he was awarded the European Hematology Association (EHA) Education and Mentoring Award for contributions to hematology education and mentorship. In 2021, he received the Kuwait Prize in Applied Medical Sciences from the Kuwait Foundation for the Advancement of Sciences (KFAS).

== Selected Publications and Conferences ==
Taher has published extensively in medical journals on topics related to thalassemia, iron overload and benign hematology. He has also presented at numerous regional and international conferences.

=== Selected Journal Articles ===
Sources:

- Musallam, K. M., Tamim, H. M., Richards, T., Spahn, D. R., Rosendaal, F. R., Habbal, A., Khreiss, M., Dahdaleh, F. S., Khavandi, K., Sfeir, P. M., Soweid, A., Hoballah, J. J., Taher, A. T., & Jamali, F. R. (2011). Preoperative anaemia and postoperative outcomes in non-cardiac surgery: a retrospective cohort study. The Lancet, 378(9800), 1396–1407. https://doi.org/10.1016/s0140-6736(11)61381-0.
- Taher, A. T., Weatherall, D. J., & Cappellini, M. D. (2017). Thalassaemia. The Lancet, 391(10116), 155–167. https://doi.org/10.1016/s0140-6736(17)31822-6.
- Cappellini, M. D., Musallam, K. M., & Taher, A. T. (2019). Iron deficiency anaemia revisited. Journal of Internal Medicine, 287(2), 153–170. https://doi.org/10.1111/joim.13004.
- Fawaz, H., Hodroj, M. H., Charbel, N., El Khoury, S., & Taher, A. (2025). Therapeutic Response to Hydroxyurea in Beta-Thalassemia Intermedia with Rare Mutation: A Case Report. Hemoglobin, 1–5. https://doi.org/10.1080/03630269.2025.2543327.
- Puyo, P. V., Christou, S., Campisi, S., Rodríguez-Sánchez, M. A., Reidel, S., Perez-Hoyo, S., Mota, M., Savvidou, I., Rekleiti, A., Salvo, A., Voi, V., Ferrero, G. B., Mandrile, G., Gaglioti, C. M., Cela, E., Ponce-Salas, B., Bardón-Cancho, E. J., Flevari, P., Voskaridou-Dimoula, E., . . . Del Mar Mañú-Pereira, M. (2025). COVID- 19 in patients affected by red blood cell disorders, results from the European registry ERN-EuroBloodNet. Orphanet Journal of Rare Diseases, 20(183). https://doi.org/10.1186/s13023-025-03683-7.
- Taher, A. T., Al-Samkari, H., Aydinok, Y., Besser, M., Boscoe, A. N., Dahlin, J. L., De Luna, G., Estepp, J. H., Gheuens, S., Gilroy, K. S., Glenthøj, A., Goh, A. S., Iyer, V., Kattamis, A., Loggetto, S. R., Morris, S., Musallam, K. M., Osman, K., Ricchi, P., . . . Kuo, K. H. M. (2025). Mitapivat in adults with non-transfusion-dependent α-thalassaemia or β-thalassaemia (ENERGIZE): a phase 3, international, randomised, double-blind, placebo-controlled trial. The Lancet, 406(10498), 33-42. https://doi.org/10.1016/s0140-6736(25)00635-x.
- Maggio, A., Napolitano, M., Taher, A. T., Bou‐Fakhredin, R., & Ostuni, M. A. (2024). Reframing thalassaemia syndrome as a benign haematopoietic stem cell disorder. British Journal of Haematology, 206(2): 464–477.. https://doi.org/10.1111/bjh.19919.

=== Selected Conferences ===
- EHA 2025 Congress - June 11 – 14, 2025, Milan, Italy.
- EHA 2023 Congress- June 8-11, 2023-Frankfurt, Germany
- The 24th Egyptian Thalassemia Association (ETA & TIF) Conference-10-11 May 2023-Cairo, Egypt
- 3rd Translational Research Conference: Erythropoiesis Control and Ineffective Erythropoiesis: from bench to bedside-March 3-5, 2023-Paris, France
- The 64th ASH Annual Meeting and Exposition- December 10-13, 2022. New Orleans, LA, USA.
- European Hematology Association 2022 Annual Congress-June 8-12, 2022 – Vienna, Austria
- 1st Sickle Cell Academy-MENA Region-December 2021-March 2022-Webinar
- 15th International Conference on Thalassemia and other Hemoglobinopathies-Thalassemia International Federation-November 19-21, 2021 (Virtual)
- 2nd Translational Research Conference: Erythropoiesis Control and Ineffective Erythropoiesis -From Bench to Bedside-March 5-7 2021 (Virtual)
- 15th Annual Sickle Cell and Thalassemia and 1st EHA European Sickle Cell Conference- October 26-31 2020 (Virtual)
- Kuwait Thalassemia Day, May 29-31, 2025, Kuwait.
- Rare Disease Congress- April 16-20, 2025, Abu Dhabi.
- 1st Levant Iron Academy-Beirut, Lebanon-November 2-4 2018.
- Hemophilia Advisory Board-Beirut, Lebanon-October 17 2018.
- Jadenu: Adding Value & Improving Outcomes-Beirut, Lebanon-October 11 2018.
- Thalassemia Overview & Iron Overload in TDT-Beirut, Lebanon, October 8 2018.
- AUB/RCP Symposium-Beirut, Lebanon-September 26 2018.
- Iron deficiency across chronic inflammatory conditions-Beirut, Lebanon-September 18 2018.
- Thalassemia Preceptorship-Beirut, Lebanon-September 10-11 2018.
- Iron Chelation: Unmet medical Need-Beirut, Lebanon-July 26 2018.
