= Dalal Khalil Safadi =

Lebanese writer and translator

Dalal Khalil Safadi (1898 – February 4, 1976; Arabic: دلال خليل صفدي) was a Lebanese writer and translator. Considered a pioneer in the short story genre among Middle Eastern women, she was the first woman to publish a short story collection in Iraq.

== Early life and education ==
Dalal Khalil Safadi was born in 1898 in Beirut, Lebanon. She was educated in Bethlehem and at the American University of Beirut's women's college.

== Career beginnings in the Middle East ==
Early in her career, Safadi worked as a teacher, including as an Arabic, history, and English instructor in Lebanon, Iraq, and Nazareth. A devout Christian, her placements included at a Presbyterian mission school in Baghdad. She also began working as a translator, translating works from English for publication in al-Irfan magazine around 1932.

In 1935, she published the short story collection Hawadith wa 'ibar (وعبر حوادث, meaning "Incidents and Lessons") in Lebanon in 1935. Then, in 1937, the book was published by al-Ra'i Press in Najaf, making her the first woman to publish a short story collection in Iraq. Contemporaneous female authors in Iraq also tend to publish their works using pseudonyms in order to appease family and traditions.

While she is considered a pioneering short story writer in Lebanon and Iraq, the critic 'Umar Muhammad Talib argues that her stories are better categorized as didactic tales rather than fiction, employing "an oratorical language and a resounding tone to preach to her sisters and encourage them to hold to virtue, morals, and religious teachings. The writer tells stories of the wretched fates that are the end of deviant women."

== Emigration to the United States ==
In the late 1930s, at age 38, Safadi emigrated to the United States, settling in the Detroit area where her sister lived. There, she studied sociology at Michigan State University, graduating with a master's degree in 1948, after which she researched child welfare in Detroit. She also taught Arabic at both Michigan State and Wayne State University.

While living in Michigan, she published a monthly bilingual Arab-English magazine, Echo of the East, from 1946 to 1948. The magazine provided news, culture, and household tips for an audience of Arab readers in the United States and across the border in Canada.

After 15 years in Lansing, she moved to Washington, D.C., in 1950, having accepted a job monitoring and translating international news for the U.S. Department of Defense. In 1954, she published a book of Arabic proverbs and songs she had translated into English, Alf mit̲l wa-mit̲l (A Thousand and One Arabic Proverbs), with a publisher in Beirut. In this period she also wrote a popular collection of Lebanese-Syrian recipes, initially with a publisher in Washington, but later republished in Detroit, Beirut, and Sherbrooke.

== Later years in Canada ==
While living in Washington, Safadi was courted by mail by a Lebanese dry goods store owner in Coaticook, Quebec, named Michael Elias. She eventually agreed to marry him, and in 1961 they wed and she migrated to Canada. There, she wrote the book Arba'un qissa haqiqiya waq'iya (Forty Real-Life Stories), which is based on her experiences as a young woman in the Middle East. It was published by al-Amrikiya Press in Canada in 1965.

After Elias's death around 1968, she moved to Windsor, Ontario, to be close to her circle in Michigan while remaining in Canada. She lived there for nine years, until her death in 1976 at age 86.
