= Makhluf Haddadin =

Jordanian chemist (1935–2022)

Makhluf J. Haddadin
- Born: 1935; Ma'in, Jordan
- Died: September 21, 2022 (aged 86–87)
- Education: American University of Beirut, University of Colorado Boulder
- Scientific career
- Fields: Chemistry
- Workplaces: American University of Beirut

Makhluf J. Haddadin (1935 – September 21, 2022) was a Jordanian chemistry professor at the American University of Beirut.

== Biography ==
Haddadin was born in Ma'in, Jordan in 1935. He won a full scholarship from the Jordanian Ministry of Education, to study chemistry at the American University of Beirut from which he graduated with a B.Sc. and an M.Sc. under the direction of Costas H. Issidorides. He then left for the University of Colorado Boulder, Colorado, USA where he received a Ph.D. degree in organic chemistry under the direction of Alfred Hassner. After two years of postdoctoral work under Louis Fieser at Harvard University, he joined the Faculty of Arts and Sciences at the American University of Beirut where he was a Professor of Chemistry.

Haddadin served the American University of Beirut as Vice President for Academic Affairs (12 years), Acting Dean of the Faculty of Health Sciences (3.5 years), Chairman of the Chemistry Department (10 years), occasional Acting Dean of the Faculty of Arts and Sciences, Acting Deputy President and Acting President.

== Scientific work ==
Haddadin was a heterocyclic chemist whose contributions are marked by his co-invention, with Costas H. Issidorides, of a method of making hundreds if not thousands of heterocyclic compounds, in what is currently known in the chemical literature as “The Beirut Reaction”.

Some of the compounds made by this method have antibacterial activities and anticancer properties. The latter are exemplified by the trade names of Carbadox and Mecadox which were marketed by the drug company: Chas. Pfizer. One compound TPZ (3-amino-1,2,4-benzotriazene 1,4-dioxide) is currently in the third stage of clinical testing as an anticancer drug. In addition, Haddadin has done original work in the areas of Isobenzofuran, Isoindoles, tetrazines, quinolines, furans, pyrroles, cinnolines and indazoles. He has ninety publications in refereed journals, and 42 patents in 25 countries.

Haddadin co-discovered the Davis–Beirut chemical reaction with Mark Kurth and first published about it around 2005. In their seventh paper on the subject, Kurth and Haddadin named it after the universities where they worked, University of California, Davis and American University of Beirut. The paper has been cited 36 times in Google Scholar.

Haddadin died on September 21, 2022.
