= Nina Katchadourian =

American interdisciplinary artist and educator (born 1968)

- Born: 1968 (age 57–58); Stanford, California
- Website: http://www.ninakatchadourian.com/

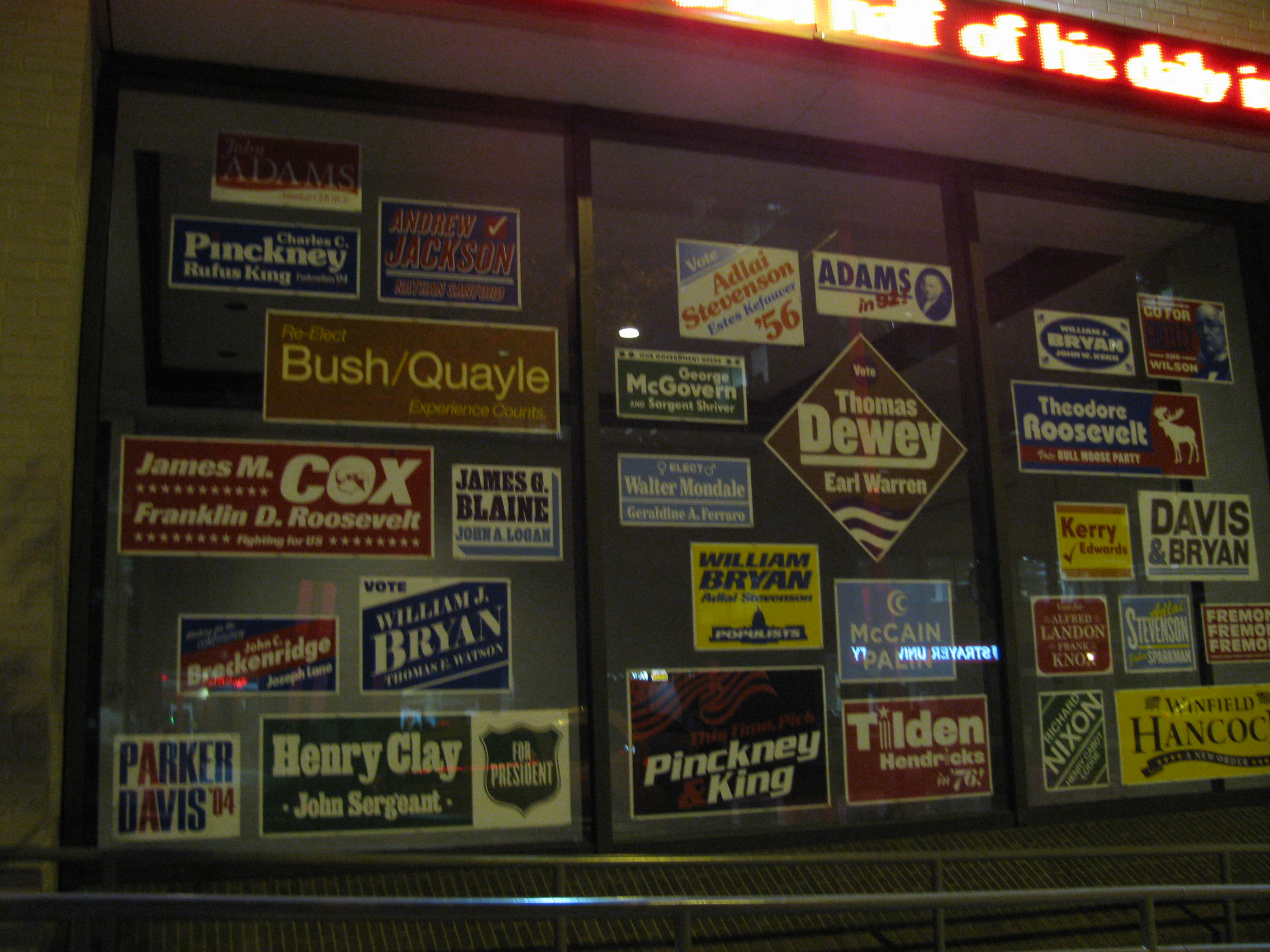
"Monument to the Unelected", installed in storefront Washington Post 15th street, N.W. Washington, D.C.

Nina Katchadourian (born 1968) is an American interdisciplinary artist and educator. She works with photography, sculpture, video, and sound—often in playful ways. She is best known for her “Lavatory Self-Portraits in the Flemish Style,” a series of self-portraits taken in airplane bathrooms.

Her projects have been exhibited widely, including a solo show at the Museum of Contemporary Art San Diego in July 2008, the Turku Art Museum in Finland in January 2006, and the ArtPace Foundation for Contemporary Art. A major mid-career survey exhibition of her art accompanied by an exhibition catalog was organized by the Blanton Museum of Art in Austin in 2017 and traveled to the Cantor Center for Visual Arts at Stanford University, 2017–2018.

== Biography ==
Nina Katchadourian was born in Stanford, California in 1968. Her father, Herant Katchadourian, a Turkey-born and Beirut-raised Armenian, was a psychiatrist and is a former Dean at Stanford University, and a Professor Emeritus of Human Biology. Her mother, Stina Katchadourian, a Swedish-speaking Finn, is a literary translator and writer. She grew up spending summers on a small island in the Finnish archipelago, where she still spends part of each year. Katchadourian attended Gunn High School in Palo Alto, California.

She received a B.A. degree from Brown University in 1989, and an M.F.A. degree from University of California, San Diego (UCSD) in 1993. She attended the Independent Study Program of the Whitney Museum of American Art in New York City in 1996.

She lives and works in Brooklyn, New York City, and is on the faculty at New York University, Gallatin School of Individualized Study. Katchadourian is married to Sina Najafi, founding editor-in-chief of Cabinet Magazine.

== Work ==
Katchadourian has worked in many media, including sculpture, photography, video, and sound. The underlying concept is often marked by an intrinsic sense of humor, characterized by an intelligent, ironic and systemic reordering of natural processes. Her work is simple yet effective.

=== Orderings ===
Many of Katchadourian’s pieces involve bringing an incisive and playful order to the world. The “Sorted Books” series, for instance, ranges from ephemeral and impromptu arrangements of volumes on the shelves of friends, to commissioned photographed orderings of books in museum and library collections. The body of work is available as a book published by Chronicle Books.

=== Mended Spider Webs ===
Her “mended spider webs” series involves making careful but obvious “repairs” to the rips that occur in natural spiderwebs. Using tweezers and glue she continued the pattern of the spider webs with starched bright red twine. The tools used to repair these spider webs can also be found in her “Do-it Yourself Spiderweb Repair Kit” piece, also part of the “Mended Spider Webs” series. While working on the series, Katchadourian became interested in how nature feels about humans attempt to ‘help’. The next morning she found that the spiders did not appreciate her help. When she went out to the first spiderweb repair the following morning she found the red twine unraveled and lying on the ground below. The spiders had rejected her help and undone all of her work throughout the night. Katchadourian was able to capture the rejection process on tape in a 10 minute video titled “GIFT/GIFT”.

=== Maps and charts ===
In some cases, Katchadourian makes this obsession with order explicit, by working with maps and charts. Her “Family Tree” series creates faux genealogies for such objects as rocks and airplanes. Other pieces are literally made of the fragments of maps. Her “Coastal Merger” shows a map of the United States made of only the Eastern and Western seaboards; “Map Dissection I” cuts out only the streets from a standard-issue road atlas, and mounts them as a kind of arterial web on glass.

=== Performances ===
Katchadourian has brought her fascination with systems to public spaces as well. In CARPARK, a 1994 work at Southwestern College, she sorted by color vast numbers of cars in more than a dozen parking lots. In 2006, in a project sponsored by the Public Art Fund, Katchadourian installed a telescope on a Manhattan street corner, focused on a 17th-floor office of a nearby building. During the course of the project, the lawyer who inhabited the office would arrange objects on his window sill to send coded messages to the observer.

=== Seat Assignment ===
Through the use of humor, Katchadourian is able to create art using materials that are on hand at any given time. This series which she calls “seat assignments” includes work such as, “birdsong substituted for car alarms… a popcorn machine’s clatter interpreted as Morse code… the piling of pretzel crumbs atop a magazine photograph of a bridge to suggest a landslide, for example, or the configuring of the folds of a black sweater to resemble the face of a gorilla”. These works while as a concept are about connecting two things ranging from, “seamless to awkwardly disjunctive” are not simple ideas that fall flat, in that they exploit the brains desires to form meaning. Her “Lavatory Self-Portraits in the Flemish Style” are part of this series.

=== Museum interventions ===
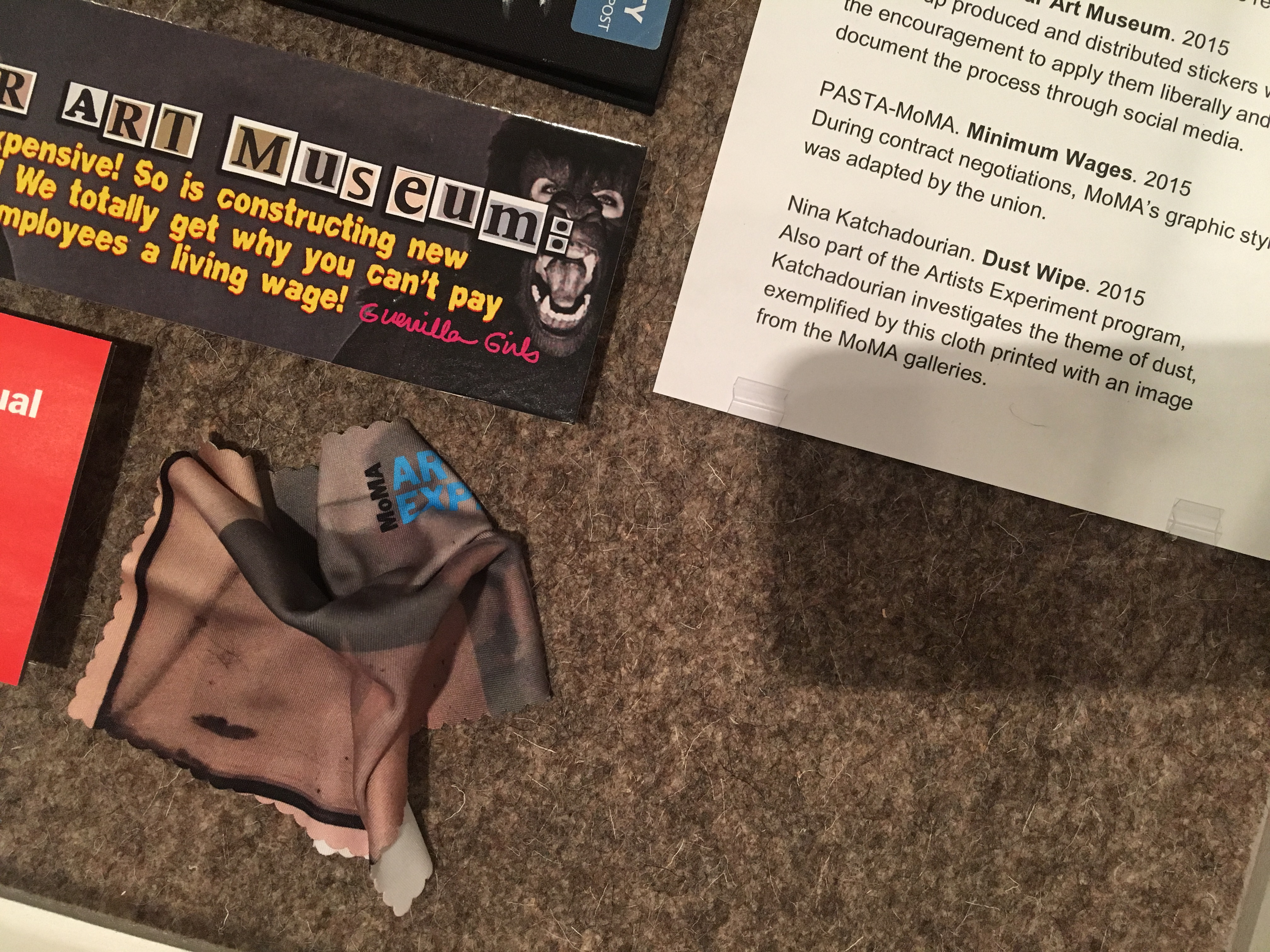
A promotional dust wipe produced during ‘’Dust Gathering’’'s planning, as displayed in the 2015 exhibition Messing with MoMA

In 2015, the Museum of Modern Art invited Katchadourian to produce a work under its ‘’Artists Experiment’’ program, in which contemporary artists create or perform pieces reflecting upon or utilizing museum resources. Having noticed the immense quantity of dust which collected in various locations around the museum’s architecture and on artworks within its collection, Katchadourian produced a series of audio segments for the museum’s existing audio guide program which toured visitors through a series of stops where dust commonly collected, and featured interviews with various MoMA staff on their methodologies and experiences dealing with dust in the museum. The audio tour became available in October 2016, and was scheduled to run through April 2017.

In late 2025/early 2026, Katchadourian’s ‘’Fake Plants’’ series were part of a museum intervention at The Hyde Collection in Glens Falls, NY. Her sculptures of imaginary flora made from cast-off materials, along with two of her famous ‘’Lavatory Self-Portraits in the Flemish Style’’, were integrated with The Hyde’s historic collection of work by Botticelli, Rembrandt, Titian, and other Old Masters.

== Exhibitions ==
=== Solo shows ===
- 2006: ‘’All Forms of Attraction’’, Frances Young Tang Teaching Museum and Art Gallery, Skidmore College, Saratoga Springs, NY
- 2008: ‘’Cerca Series’’, Museum of Contemporary Art San Diego, San Diego, CA
- 2017: ‘’Nina Katchadourian: Curiouser’’, Blanton Museum of Art, Austin, TX
- 2017: ‘’The Recarcassing Ceremony’’, Catherine Clark Gallery, San Francisco, CA
- 2017–2018: ‘’Curiouser’’, Iris & B. Gerald Cantor Center for Visual Arts, Stanford University, Stanford, CA
- 2019: ‘’Ification’’, Fridman Gallery, New York, NY
- 2023: ‘’Uncommon Denominator: Nina Katchadourian at the Morgan’’, The Morgan Library and Museum, New York, NY

=== Group shows ===
- 2013: ‘’Balls to the Wall’’, DODGE Gallery, New York City
