= Maan Hamadeh =

- Also known as: ThePianoMaan
- Born: Maan M. Hamade
- Occupation: Pianist
- Instrument: Piano
- Years active: 2004–present
- Website: www.maanhamadeh.com

Maan Hamadeh is a Lebanese pianist. He lives in Dubai and has played at Prague's Vaclav Havel Airport. His musicianship had been mentioned in mainstream media.

His YouTube video, "Für Elise in Different Tastes", gained over 17 million views in two months and more than 50 million before April 2020. His first full-evening live concert was in Samqaniyeh el Chouf, Lebanon. As a part of Play Me project, Hamadeh was invited to Budapest Ferenc Liszt International Airport on 1 October 2015 to celebrate International Music Day. He played at Dubai's first pop-up piano.
