= Edvick Jureidini Shayboub =

- Born: 1 February 1918; Lebanon
- Died: 2002 (aged 83–84)
- Education: The National College of Choueifat; National College of Choueifat; American University in Beirut
- Occupations: Activist; Educator; Journalist; Feminist
- Spouse: Toufic Shayboub
- Children: 2

Edvick Jureidini Shayboub, born 1 February 1918, was a Lebanese journalist, news presenter, feminist, activist, and educator. She died in 2002.

== Life ==
Shayboub was born in Choueifat and attended the National College of Choueifat for high school until her graduation in 1932. Her maternal grandmother attended the American School for Girls around 80 years earlier and was one of the few women to receive an education above elementary school in the era.

Faced with financial challenges and considered an excellent student, she was granted a partial scholarship for her tuition at Beirut College for Women and she enrolled in October 1932. She studied Arabic literature, social studies, and the Arabic language, and graduated with an A.A. degree from her sophomore class in June 1934.

After earning her college degree, Shayboub taught at a secondary school in Basra, Iraq. She taught Arabic four years before teaching for three years in Baghdad (1934–1941). While in Iraq, she met engineer Toufic Jureidini whom she married in 1940. He was killed in 1944, leaving behind two children, Sana and Sarmad. With the help of Shukri Chammas (her husband's boss at work), she founded a kindergarten in partnership with the Lebanese Women's University. After two years, she left to work in journalism.

== Family ==
In 1941, Shayboub stopped teaching and married Toufic Jureidini, an engineer from Tripoli. They had a son, Sarmad (1942), and a daughter, Sana (1943). In 1944 Toufic was killed.

== Vocational experience ==
Jureidini started her career in journalism and radio by discussing topics such as sociological problems and childcare with the governmental radio. at the same time, she wrote for Saout El-Mar'a, which was the only women's magazine in Lebanon back in the time, and her accomplishments helped her get promoted to secretary editor in 1948.

In 1949, Jureidini received a scholarship to pursue a Bachelor of Arts degree in Arabic and journalism at the American University of Beirut, which she graduated from in 1951 with distinction.

Afterwards, she was the chief editor of Saout El-Mar'a from 1951 to 1956, when the magazine ceased operations.

== Journalism ==
Jureidini began working in journalism in 1947 where she presented the daily news, in addition to daily shows about women for 30 years. After working with Radio Lebanon from 1947, she became a permanent worker in 1953. Her shows received international and local praise, and she participated with the Near East Arab Broadcasting Station in giving talks, book reviews, and panel discussions.

Ever since the foundation of the literary society Friends of the Book in 1950, Jureidini became an engaged associate. She was also part of the Children's Books Committee for Franklin Publications.

In 1957, Jureidini stopped delivering the daily news and committed to the women's program "Dunia Al-Bait", which she presented for fifteen minutes each day, tackling all sorts of topics related to women's sociology, health, education, beauty, love, and marriage. She was also involved with the Voice of America and the British Broadcasting Corporation for which she regularly wrote programs, book criticisms, debates, and talks.

== Activism ==
In 1968, Jureidini was invited by the American government to the "Female Organization in Journalism and Television", where she spoke about Lebanon, its women, and its society.

After being an active participant in the Association of Lebanese Women University, she was appointed chairwomen of the Press Committee from 1958 to 1961, after which she represented the New Council for the National Council of Lebanese women.

In 1966, Jureidini and five other delegates represented Lebanon and the Lebanese Council of Women in many global conferences, such as the International Council of Women in Teheran. Because of her journalistic reputation, she represented the Committee for Radio and Television, Press and Public Relations. She was elected to the board of the Lebanese Council of Women as a national correspondent for nine consecutive years and as the vice president of the Committee for Radio and Television, Press, and Public Relations in the International Council of Women.

Jureidini was additionally involved in several organizations, such as Alma Mater B.C.W, to give educational discussions related to women's issues, especially regarding the younger generation.

Doctor Charl Rizk, the general director of the Ministry of Journalism gave her a medal of honour in 1968 and said: "Edvick Jureidini, with her radio programs about women, has entered every home and she was a school."

In 1969, Jureidini attained a master's degree in literature from the American University in Beirut, while her son graduated as a civil engineer in the same year and her daughter pursued interior design.

=== International contacts ===
Jureidini attended the Conference of The Federation of Tunisian Women in 1962. She was also invited by the Iraq government to visit Iraq, where she taught for seven years.

She participated in the Annual Conference of The National Council of Women of Great Britain. Upon Jureidini's return to Lebanon, the president of the National Council of Women of Great Britain wrote a letter to Ibtihaj Kaddoura, the president of The National Council of Lebanese Women on 2 November 1962 in which she congratulated her on having an active member of the National Council of Women in Beirut as charming, proficient, and brilliant as Edvick Jureidini.

Jureidini was invited to participate in the Educational Exchange Program of The U.S. State Department. This program aims at encouraging the exchange of knowledge and expertise in the Press, Radio, and Television sectors. During her long tour in the United States, she was interviewed by television, press, and many local radio stations such as the Voice of America in Washington.

== Activism before 1975 ==
Below is a list of Jureidini's activism roles and involvements before the year 1975:

- Responsible for media in the Lebanese Women's Council
- Active member of the Association of Lebanese University Women
- Chair of the press committee from 1958 to 1961
- Member of Friends of the Book, a literary society, since its establishment in 1950, and a member of the Children's Books Committee for Franklin publications
- The head of the library committee of Najla Saab, which opened in 1974 in memory of the president of the Women's Council. The library is a reference for researchers on women's literature and women's movements around the world, in Arabic, French, and English.
- President of the Association for the Promotion of Arts in Lebanon.
- Head of the Sexual Education Committee at the Family Organization Association in Lebanon.
- Public Relations Officer at Al Tadamun Education Foundation, which offered loans without interest for Lebanese university students.
- Representative of the Family Organizing Association in Lebanon in the International Seminar on Sexology, which was held in Stockholm at the invitation of the Swedish Association for Sexual Education in 1981.
- Represented the Lebanese Women's Council in the Tunisian Women's Union Conference in 1960.
- Represented the Lebanese Women's Council at the seminar called by the Sudanese Women's Union in Khartoum in 1974.
- Participated with the delegation of the Lebanese Women's Council to the conferences of the International Women's Council, including the conference held in Tehran in 1966 and the conference held in Bangkok 1970, where she was elected vice president of the Media Committee of the International Women's Council.
- Alone from the Middle East, she was invited to the First International Conference on Women in Radio and Television, which was held in London in 1969.

== Published works ==
=== Books ===
- بوح (Reveal), 1954
- شوق (Longing), 1962 from free sentimental poetry, which is a continuation of بوح.
- ذكرياتي مع جبران (My Memories with Gibran), 1957
- الطبيب الصغير (Little Doctor), 1963
- الحرف الشعبيه في لبنان (Folk Crafts in Lebanon), 1964
- شكري حنا شماس سيرة (Biography of Shukri Hanna Chammas), 1972.
- عنبر رقم 12 (Amber No. 12), 1980.
- مكتبه الطفل, a seven-book series dedicated to children.

=== Translations ===
Translated American novels into Arabic, such as, but not limited to:

- The Country Wife by Dorothy Van Doren (1959).
- The Townsmen by Pearl Buck (1961).
- The Two Worlds of Dary Blount by Thelma Harrington Bell (1963).

Jureidini also delivered a lot of lectures and speeches, such as but not limited to: "Lebanese Women, Present and Future" in 1958, "Role of Higher Education in achieving Freedom" in 1961, and "Our Children's Needs and Rights" in 1963. She has also been the speaker at institutions such as The National College in Alley (1960), Tripoli Girls' School (1964), and Sidon Evangelical School (1966).

== Medals and prizes ==
In recognition of her services of over 35 years, she was granted by the Lebanese government:

- The Golden Honorary Medal in 1958.
- The Gold Medal of the Cedars was granted to her by the Lebanese government in recognition of her courageous work on the radio during the 1958 crisis in Lebanon.
- Medal of Virtue and Honor for her endurance on the radio amid the accidents of 1985.
- Medal of the Cedar (Night rank) in 1968 in the era of Charles Helou, (Officer rank) 1985 in the era of Amin Jamael, and (Commander rank) which was awarded in 2003 after her death.
- The President's Prize in 1984 in honour of her literary contributions.
