= Lina M. Obeid =

American physician and cancer researcher (1955–2019)

- Born: Lina Marie Obeid; July 22, 1955; New York City, NY
- Died: November 29, 2019 (aged 64)
- Occupation: Medical researcher

Lina M. Obeid (July 22, 1955 – November 29, 2019) was an American physician and cancer researcher.

== Early life ==
Lina Marie Obeid was born in New York and raised in Lebanon, the daughter of Dr. Sami Obeid, a renowned Lebanese surgeon, and Rosette Z. Obeid, a Palestinian writer and cookbook author. Obeid earned a bachelor's degree in chemistry from Rutgers University. She earned her medical degree with distinction at the American University of Beirut in 1983.

== Career ==
Obeid completed her medical internship and residency at Duke University (1983–1986), followed by a fellowship in Endocrinology and postdoctoral training in the laboratory of future Nobel laureate Robert Lefkowitz (1986–1988). She remained at Duke as an associate professor of Medicine and Cell Biology, and as a staff physician at the Durham VA Medical Center. In 1998, she joined the faculty of the Medical University of South Carolina (MUSC) as the Boyle Professor in the departments of Medicine and Biochemistry. She was also on staff as a physician at the Charleston Veterans Affairs Hospital. While at MUSC, in addition to her research, Dr. Obeid led a very successful program funded by a COBRE grant that trained a large number of scientists in various aspects of lipid research. She particularly fostered the careers of numerous women scientists. In 2012, she moved to Stony Brook University where she was a SUNY Distinguished Professor of Medicine and Dean of Research at Stony Brook University's Renaissance School of Medicine. Dr. Obeid was also co-director (with Yusuf A. Hannun) of the Kavita and Lalit Bahl Center for Metabolomics and Imaging, a major program focused on the study of lipids, metabolism, and imaging in Cancer Biology and Therapeutics.

Obeid's research involved sphingolipids and their role in aging and cancer processes. She is considered a pioneer in the field of bioactive sphingolipids, and wrote or co-authored over 250 academic research articles and reviews. Among her many contributions was the first study documenting a role for ceramide in mediating apoptosis, and defining the roles of bioactive lipids in cell senescence. This discovery, published in the journal Science in 1993, has since generated more than 4,000 follow-up publications in ceramide-apoptosis-related research. In 2019, Obeid (with Yusuf A. Hannun) received a Lifetime Achievement Award at the 16th International Conference on Bioactive Lipids in Cancer, Inflammation and Related Diseases. She was the first woman so honored by the conference. "It's so important for emerging scientists – especially for young women considering a career in the sciences – to know they can make a difference in the field of cancer research," Obeid said, in receiving the award. Supporting her research laboratory, Obeid held both a Veteran Affairs Merit Award and a National Institutes of Health research grant for over two decades.

== Personal life ==
Obeid was married to fellow medical researcher Yusuf A. Hannun. Their triplet children, Reem, Marya, and Awni, have all found careers in research. She died in 2019, aged 64, from complications of lung cancer.
