= Angela Jurdak Khoury =

Lebanese diplomat (1915–2011)

Angela Khoury أنجيلا خوري
- Born: September 24, 1915; Dhour El Choueir, Mount Lebanon Mutasarrifate
- Died: May 29, 2011 (aged 95); Washington, D.C.
- Occupations: Diplomat, college professor

Angela Jurdak Khoury (Arabic: أنجيلا جرداق خوري; September 24, 1915 - May 29, 2011) was a Lebanese diplomat and college professor based in Washington, D.C. representative to the United Nations Commission on the Status of Women CSW at its founding years during the drafting of the Universal Declaration of Human Rights.

== Early life ==
Khoury was born in Dhour El Choueir, in the Mount Lebanon Mutasarrifate (Modern day Lebanon) the daughter of Mansur Hanna Jurdak (1881–1964), a mathematician and astronomer on the faculty of the American University of Beirut, and Leah Abs Jurdak. Khoury attended the American Junior College for Women and then the American University of Beirut, completing undergraduate studies in 1937 and a master's degree in 1938, in sociology. Later in life, she earned a PhD in international relations, from American University in Washington D.C.

As a young woman, Khoury was a member of the Lebanese national tennis team, played piano in concerts, and was known as a long-distance swimmer.

== Career ==
Khoury taught sociology at the American University of Beirut beginning in 1938, the university's first woman instructor. She served as assistant director of the Allied Powers Radio Poll for Syria, Lebanon, and Palestine during World War II. After the war, she joined the Lebanese delegation to the United Nations and was a member of the Legation of Lebanon based in Washington, D.C. She was the first woman diplomat from Lebanon. She was Lebanese consul in New York for a time, and served on the United Nations Commission on the Status of Women at its founding in 1946. She resigned from her work with the Lebanese Ministry of Foreign Affairs in 1966.

She was a professor of government at George Mason University from 1967 until she retired in 1982.

== Honors ==
Khoury was awarded the National Order of the Cedar by the Lebanese government in 1959. The Angela J. Khoury Award for Outstanding Senior in Government and International Politics is awarded at George Mason University in her memory.

== Personal life ==
Khoury married lawyer Shukry Issa Khoury in 1949. They had two sons, Philip and George. She was widowed when Shukry Khoury died in 1985. Angela Jurdak Khoury died in 2011, aged 95 years, in Washington D.C. She lived in her later years with her sister Salma Mansur Jurdak, also a diplomat based in Washington D.C.; Salma Jurdak died in 2017 at age 97.
