= Yusuf A. Hannun =

American lipid and cancer researcher

- Born: Yusuf Awni Hannun; September 18, 1955 (age 70); Saudi Arabia
- Occupation: Medical researcher
- Known for: Sphingolipid signaling and metabolism

Yusuf Awni Hannun (born September 18, 1955) is an American molecular biologist, biochemist, and clinician. He is known for the discovery that sphingolipids have signaling functions.

== Early life ==
Yusuf Awni Hannun was born in Saudi Arabia of Palestinian parents, Mrs. Aida Ashur-Hannun and Dr. Awni Hannun. He received his early education in Beirut at the International College and earned a Bachelor of Science at the American University of Beirut in 1977. Following his undergraduate degree, Hannun continued at the American University of Beirut, obtaining an MD with distinction in 1981 and completing his internship and a residency in internal medicine

== Discovery of sphingolipid signalling ==
In 1983, Hannun left Lebanon to take up specialty training at Duke University with a fellowship in hematology and oncology as well as undergoing post-doctoral training in Biochemistry under Professor Robert Bell. It was during this time that Hannun made the initial discovery that protein kinase C was inhibited by sphingosine, showing a bioactive effect for a sphingolipid for the first time and suggesting that "a role for sphingolipids in transmembrane signaling may emerge". Prior to this discovery, sphingolipids had primarily been thought to be inert, structural components of cell membranes. Subsequent work by Hannun and his laboratory demonstrated the turnover of sphingolipids in response to cell stimuli, analogous to phosphoinositide turnover, and the linking of sphingolipids, most notably ceramide, to biologies such as cell death, growth arrest, and differentiation. These early studies by Hannun and his colleagues ushered in a period of broader investigation on sphingolipid metabolism and function.

== Subsequent career ==
In 1998, Hannun moved to the Medical University of South Carolina (MUSC) to be Chair of Biochemistry and Molecular Biology, holding the Ralph F. Hirschmann Chair of Biomedical Research, and serving as Deputy Director of the Hollings Cancer Center. While at MUSC the center was noted by the National Cancer Institute as NCI-designated. At that time there were only sixty such designated centers in the United States.

In 2012, Hannun was recruited to be Director of the Cancer Center and Vice Dean for Cancer Medicine at Stony Brook University. He is also co-director of the Kavita and Lalit Bahl Center for Metabolomics and Imaging, a major program focused on the study of lipids, metabolism, and imaging in Cancer Biology and Therapeutics. Under Hannun's leadership, cancer research and care at Stony Brook has expanded, including the establishment of a new department of bioinformatics to use computer technology to collect and analyze biological data. This culminated in the opening of the Medical and Research Translation (MART) facility in 2019, which enables scientists and clinicians to work in close proximity, to help advance cancer research and rapidly translate basic research findings into new clinical tools and therapies.

== Research Contributions, honors and awards ==
In the field of bioactive sphingolipids, Hannun has contributed over 500 academic research articles and reviews, and published a number of books. In 2004, he was elected as a fellow in the American Association for the Advancement of Science. In 2006, he was given the South Carolina Governor's award for scientific research. In 2011, he was awarded the ASBMB Avanti award for excellence in research. The contributions of Hannun and his wife Lina M. Obeid to sphingolipid research were recognized by a Lifetime Achievement Award at the 16th International Conference on Bioactive Lipids in Cancer, Inflammation and Related Diseases - the first time that it was given as a joint award.

== Personal life ==
While at the American University of Beirut, Hannun met his wife Lina M. Obeid, a fellow physician scientist and biomedical researcher who also made seminal contributions to the sphingolipid field. Their triplet children, Reem, Marya, and Awni, have all found careers in research. Obeid died in November 2019 from complications of lung cancer.
