= Oral history preservation =

Field that deals with the care and upkeep of oral history materials

Oral history preservation is the field that deals with the care and upkeep of oral history materials, whatever format they may be in. Oral history is a method of historical documentation, using interviews with living survivors of the time being investigated. Oral history often touches on topics scarcely touched on by written documents, and by doing so, fills in the gaps of records that make up early historical documents.

== Collecting oral history ==
The earliest method of collecting oral history was through memory. (see: oral tradition) With the loss of elders who were willing to preserve and pass along these histories, cultural memories began to vanish.

With the advent of the written word, it became possible for cultures to preserve their history without the memory of a select few. Spoken word was transcribed, and the eyewitness accounts of those who lived through both significant and everyday events were able to be saved for future generations to study.

This method of historical preservation was augmented with the invention of different methods to record sound. Spoken word can now be recorded on audio or video tape, or through newer digital methods.

While new media allows for richer histories to be saved, it also comes with greater issues for preservationists, one such issue being that of copyright and the ethical concerns that come along with it. For all intents and purposes, copyright does not exist in oral testimonies, at least not as clearly as it does in written documents. It is hard to decide who holds the rights to the materials and how they should be handled. There are ways to combat copyright and ethical concerns and restrictions, however. One such way is through a letter of intent. Users sign this document before listening to an oral history recording in order to demonstrate that they understand and have agreed to the usage restrictions put in place by the institution.

== Medium ==
=== Past ways of saving oral histories ===
Early methods of recording sound included phonograph cylinders (a stylus would draw wax grooves on the outside of a cylinder), gramophone records (grooves on the flat side of a disk) and magnetic recordings.

=== Current way to save oral histories ===
While reel-to-reel audio tape recordings are still used, video recordings have become standard. This allows the researcher to take body language and facial expressions (both important means of communication in themselves) into account. There is also an emerging trend to use the telephone to make audio journals when distance prevents face-to-face contact.

To help ensure the preservation of oral histories, work is transcribed and stored on reliable media. Using modern digital formats helps ensure longevity and usability. One of the simplest and easiest way collect oral histories is to record directly to an MP3 player, which are inexpensive and can hold many hours of interviews. The files are then uploaded to a central computer server and copies can be burned to optical media, or copied to USB flash drives owned by the researchers, scholars and students working with the material.

Recordable compact discs are commonly used over magnetic tape for the preservation of oral histories over a long period of time. Compact Cassette tapes and Videotape were popular but have been almost completely replaced by optical media such as CD-R and DVD media. CD-R is a successful technology that has proven its reliability over period of time, but it should be viewed with caution for long term storage as the media is easily scratched. The safest way is to make a "gold master" CD that is not ever checked out for use from the library, and duplicate copies of this for use by people wishing to access it. The Folk Heritage Collections, at the Library of Congress, set a standard for 24 bits when digitizing music. This creates "superb" sound and has a high level of detail (Danielson, 2001). The Library of Congress uses CD-R as one of its storage methods. The Library of Congress has a higher budget than many university or archives, therefore they are able to store materials in multiple places. But, the Library of Congress has stated that they do believe storing sound on CD-R is a safe storage method (Danielson, 2001). One can assume if it is considered safe by the Library of Congress it is a relatively safe method of preservation.

A huge challenge of oral history preservation today is the battle with digital obsolescence. There is an obvious link between oral history preservation and digital preservation. Oral histories are often recorded on an assortment of tapes which are ultimately transferred onto computerized, or digitized, formats in order to facilitate their longevity. These digitized formats then have to be preserved, along with their corresponding metadata, just as any other digital objects are. Technological advances are happening every day and it is difficult to keep up with these changes. Emulation and migration are two ways in which formats can be changed in order to be of use for longer. Emulation focuses on designing hardware and software that will imitate the old system so that it can accept the old files while migration focuses on fitting preserved data into a smaller number of formats that can still encode the complexities of the structure and form of the original format.

With the recent cost decreases in hard disk drives, oral archivists are considering moving many of their popular holdings to permanent storage in a server farm. For example, a single terabyte disk drive costing under $100 USD can hold 1,900 hours of uncompressed audio. A CD-R by contrast can only hold 76 minutes of uncompressed audio. Disk drive array cards such as the 3ware 9650SE can field 8TB of redundantly protected data in a standard PC case. One of the big advantages of doing this is that as the servers age and are retired, the files can simply be copied to newer, larger replacement servers making hardware obsolescence a thing of the past.

== Basic preservation of the collection ==
=== Oral history education ===
Due to the growing importance of oral histories the United States, as well as the international community, have increased funding to produce more oral histories, preserve oral history collections, and train oral historians. There are a growing number of oral history programs and classes in college and university campus across America. Although Indiana University does not offer academic degrees in oral history The Center for the Study of History and Memory offers students the opportunity to take classes on the topic. Some of the major universities that offer classes or degrees in oral history are Columbia University, University of Kentucky, and University of California Los Angeles. Many international universities and organizations are also enhancing their programs. The United Kingdom, Canada, and Australia, have all established oral history associations and offer educational classes on the subject. These programs are aimed at educating future oral historians on key issues relating to oral history, such as preservation. This is a highly debated subject matter, due to increasing technology and funding.

=== General ===
The basic preservation rule for oral histories is that the repository must make three copies each of the oral history, of the transcript, and of all accompanying paperwork (summaries and copyright statements).

- One copy will be the original item
- One copy will be the duplicating master
- One copy will be the access (public use) copy

=== Paper records ===
Transcripts of oral histories can facilitate their dissemination to the public. There are a few basic rules for paper (transcript) preservation of an oral history collection:

- Make sure transcriptions are created on acid-free paper.
- Save original transcript, and make copies for public use. Do not loan out original.
- Store paper copies of transcriptions in archival-quality, acid free boxes.

=== Magnetic records ===
There are a few basic rules for magnetic recording preservation of an oral history collection:

- Save the original tape as well as the transcript of the interview
- Make an audio copy for public use, do not allow an original to be used
- Store tapes away from magnetic fields
- Discourage users from fast forwarding and rewinding the audio tapes, this adds unnecessary wear and tear
- Remember that master copies must be played every once in a while to ensure they are still viable
- Keep tapes in an environment that will maintain a temperature between 10 and 21 °C (50 and 70 °F). The environment must also maintain a humidity level between 40-50% relative humidity (RH).

=== Digital preservation ===
There are many different digital preservation strategies, but no one strategy has been agreed upon as appropriate for all data types or institutions.

== Oral history archives ==
Oral history materials are often stored in archival repositories that facilitate their preservation and longevity. Archival repositories are kept at the correct temperature to store oral history materials and trained professionals are there to ensure that the formats of the materials are kept up to date. Archivists, Preservationists and Conservators are in a unique position to appraise the shortcomings of existing archival records and to subsequently know what value can be made by oral history materials.

== See also ==
- Intangible cultural heritage
- Oral history
- Oral tradition
