= American University of Beirut =

Private university in Lebanon

- الجامعة الأميركيّة في بيروت
- Former name: Syrian Protestant College (1866–1920)
- Motto: Ut vitam abundantius habeant (Latin)
- Motto in English: That they may have life and have it more abundantly
- Type: Private university
- Established: 1866; 160 years ago
- Endowment: $891.75 million (2025)
- Chairman: Abdo G. Kadifa
- President: Fadlo R. Khuri
- Faculty: 1,200 instructional faculty
- Administrative staff: 4,340
- Students: 9,408 (2019)
- Undergraduates: 7,782 (2019)
- Postgraduates: 1,626 (2019)
- Location: Beirut, Lebanon; 33°53′59.87″N 35°28′56.22″E
- Campus: Urban, 61-acre (250,000 m^{2}); and a 247-acre (1.00 km^{2}) research farm in Beqaa Valley
- University Press: AUB Press
- Student newspaper: Outlook
- Colors: Burgundy (color) & white
- Mascot: Phoenix
- Website: www.aub.edu.lb

The American University of Beirut (AUB; Arabic: الجامعة الأميركية في بيروت, romanized: al-Jāmiʿa l-Amērikiyya fī Bayrūt) is a private, non-sectarian, and independent university chartered in New York with its main campus in Beirut, Lebanon. AUB is governed by a private, autonomous board of trustees and offers programs leading to bachelor's, master's, MD, and PhD degrees.

AUB has an operating budget of $423 million with an endowment of approximately $768 million. The campus is composed of 64 buildings, including the American University of Beirut Medical Center (AUBMC, formerly known as AUH – American University Hospital) (420 beds), four libraries, three museums and seven dormitories. Almost one-fifth of AUB's students attended secondary school or university outside Lebanon before coming to AUB. AUB graduates reside in more than 120 countries worldwide. The language of instruction is English. Degrees awarded at the university are officially registered with the New York Board of Regents.

== History ==
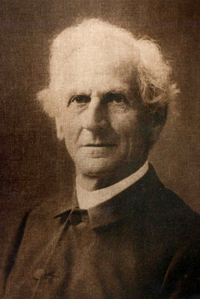
Daniel L. Bliss, who helped found Syrian Protestant College (American University of Beirut) and was its first president

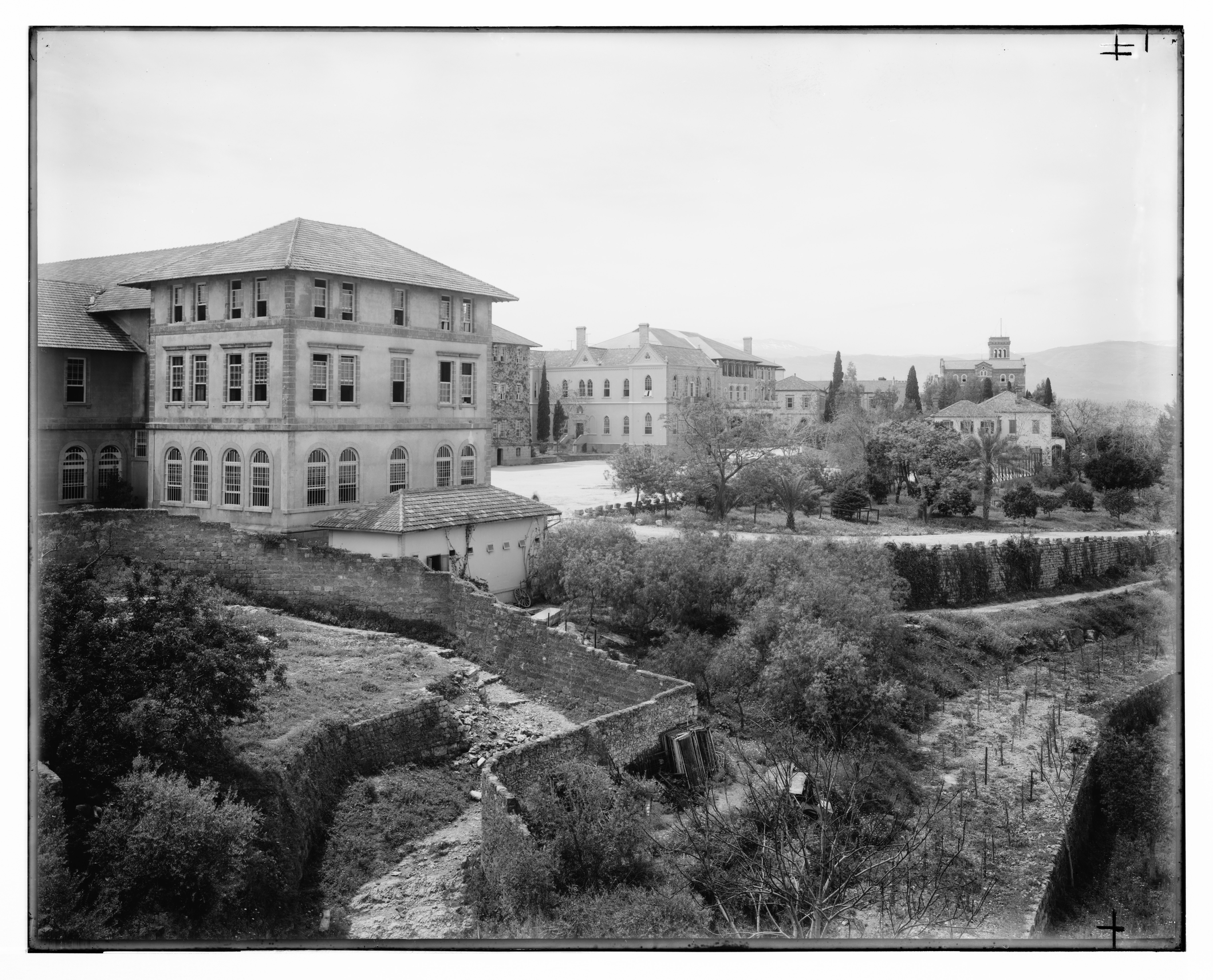
Buildings of American University, Beirut, between 1898 and 1914

On January 23, 1862, W. M. Thomson proposed to a meeting of the American Board of Commissioners for Foreign Missions that a college of higher learning, that would include medical training, should be established in Beirut with Dr. Daniel Bliss as its president. Bliss served as College president, from 1866 until 1902. On April 24, 1863, while Bliss was raising money for the new college in the United States and England, the State of New York granted a charter for the Syrian Protestant College. The college, which was renamed the American University of Beirut in 1920, opened with a class of 16 students on December 3, 1866. In the beginning Arabic was used as the language of instruction because it was the common language of the ethnic groups of the region, and prospective students needed to be fluent in Ottoman Turkish or in French as well as in English. In 1887 the language of instruction became English. The construction of AUB’s campus started with the College Hall and took two years to build. Along with the first medical building on the campus, it was put to use in 1873. Due to explosion damage in 1991 it had to be demolished and was rebuilt in 1999. In November 2015, AUB announced that it was restoring academic tenure, which had been suspended in 1985 during the Lebanese Civil War.

The college first expanded in 1867 with the addition of the School of Medicine. The Schools of Pharmacy and Preparatory Education were subsequently established. Public health education at AUB evolved from a public health centre established in 1927. The Department of Public Health was founded in 1948, followed by the School of Public Health in 1954. In 1921, women enrolled for the first time as students of medicine, pharmacy and dentistry.

Engineering courses have been offered at AUB since 1913. A separate School of Engineering was established in 1951, offering curricula in civil, mechanical, electrical and architectural engineering.

AUB alumni have had an impact on the region and the world for many years. For example, 20 AUB alumni were delegates to the signing of the United Nations Charter in 1945—more than any other university in the world. AUB graduates continue to serve in leadership positions as presidents of their countries, prime ministers, members of parliament, ambassadors, governors of central banks, presidents and deans of colleges and universities, academics, business people, scientists, engineers, doctors, teachers, and nurses. They work in governments, the private sector, and in nongovernmental organizations.

During World War I, Syrian Protestant College faculty, administrative staff, and students were actively involved in relief efforts. In 1919, after the collapse of the Ottoman Empire, former College president Howard Bliss served as an adviser at the Paris Peace Conference,where negotiations about the post-war world order took place. Bliss advocated the right to self-determination for the peoples of the Middle East.

In November 1943, during the Lebanese independence crisis, AUB students participated in demonstrations in response to the imprisonment of Lebanese officials. The protests lasted nearly two weeks and pressured the French forces to release the prisoners on 22 November, a date which would go on to be celebrated as Lebanon’s National Independence Day. During the Lebanese Civil War (1975–1990) AUB pursued various means to preserve the continuity of studies, including enrollment agreements with universities in the United States. In 1982 acting president David S. Dodge was kidnapped on campus by pro-Iranian Shiite Muslim extremists. On January 18, 1984, AUB President Malcolm H. Kerr was murdered outside his office by members of Islamic Jihad, which preceded the Hezbollah. In 1984 and 1985 a number of university staff were kidnapped, including electrical engineering professor Frank Regier, professor J. Leigh Douglas, professor Philip Padfield, professor Joseph Cicippio, dean of the faculty of Agricultural and Food Sciences Thomas Sutherland (held captive from 1985 to 1991), director David Jacobsen, and librarian Peter Kilburn (killed by his captors). In all, 30 university-connected people were kidnapped during the war.

On 8 November 1991 a car-bomb demolished the main administrative building, killing one member of staff. The New York Times reported that it was believed to have been set off by pro-Iranian Muslim fundamentalists. Another source states that Hassan Abd al-Nabih, a senior intelligence officer in the South Lebanon Army was accused of being responsible.

The university of Beirut (AUB) established a new campus, AUB Mediterraneo, in Paphos, Cyprus, in 2024. The official inauguration took place on September 4, 2024. Cyprus was selected as the site for the American University of Beirut’s first overseas campus after being chosen over 15 other countries, according to the president of the institution.

=== Presidents ===
The list of university presidents since its establishment:

- Daniel Bliss (1866–1902)
- Howard S. Bliss (1902–1920)
- Bayard Dodge (1923–1948)
- Stephen B.L. Penrose Jr. (1948–1954)
- Constantin Zureiq (1954–1957)
- J. Paul Leonard (1957–1961)
- Norman Burns (1961–1965)
- Samuel B. Kirkwood (1965–1976)
- Harold E. Hoelscher (1977–1981)
- Malcolm H. Kerr (1981–1984)
- Calvin Plimpton (1984–1987)
- Frederic P. Herter (1987–1993)
- Robert M. Haddad (1993–1996)
- David S. Dodge (1996–1997)
- John Waterbury (1997–2008)
- Peter F. Dorman (2008 – June 2015)
- Fadlo R. Khuri (September 2015–present)

== Campus ==
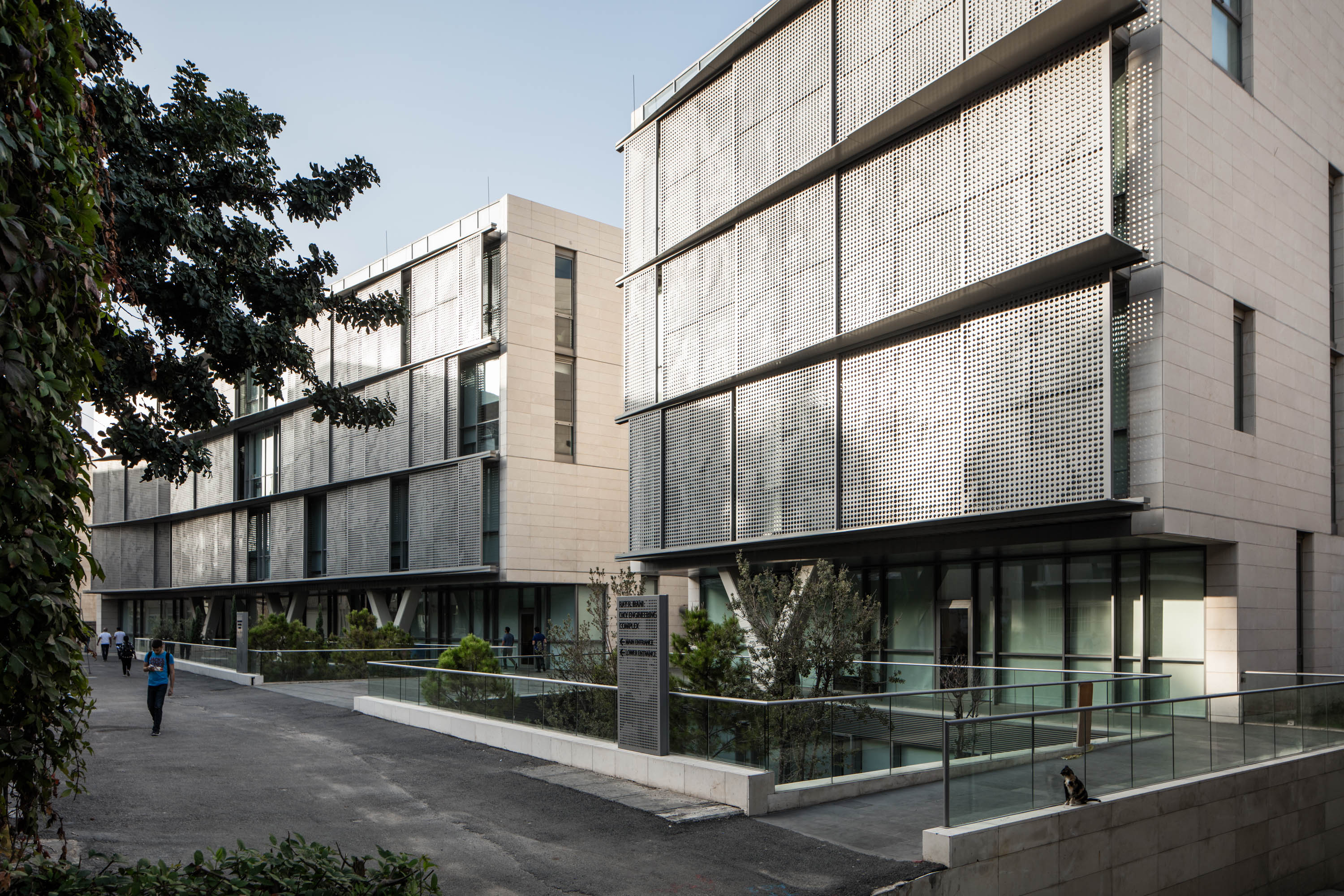
New buildings on the campus

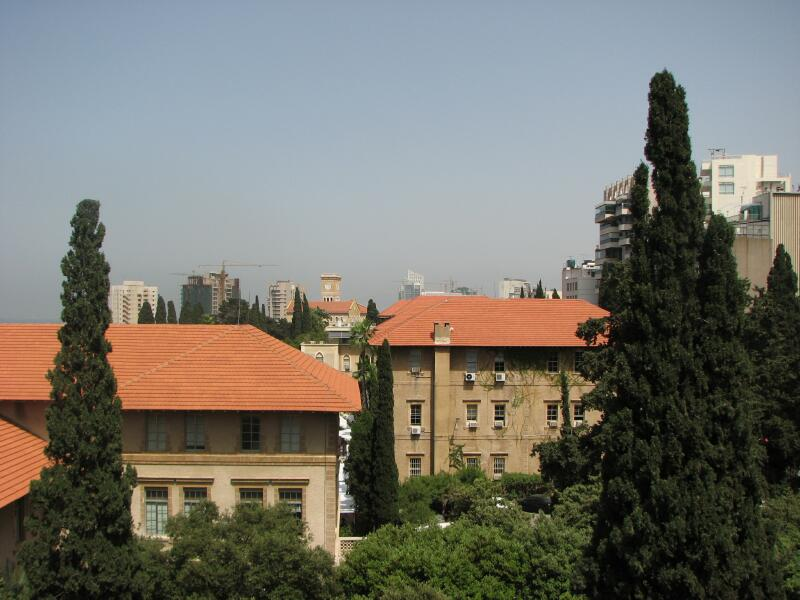
Part of the upper campus as seen from Penrose dormitory

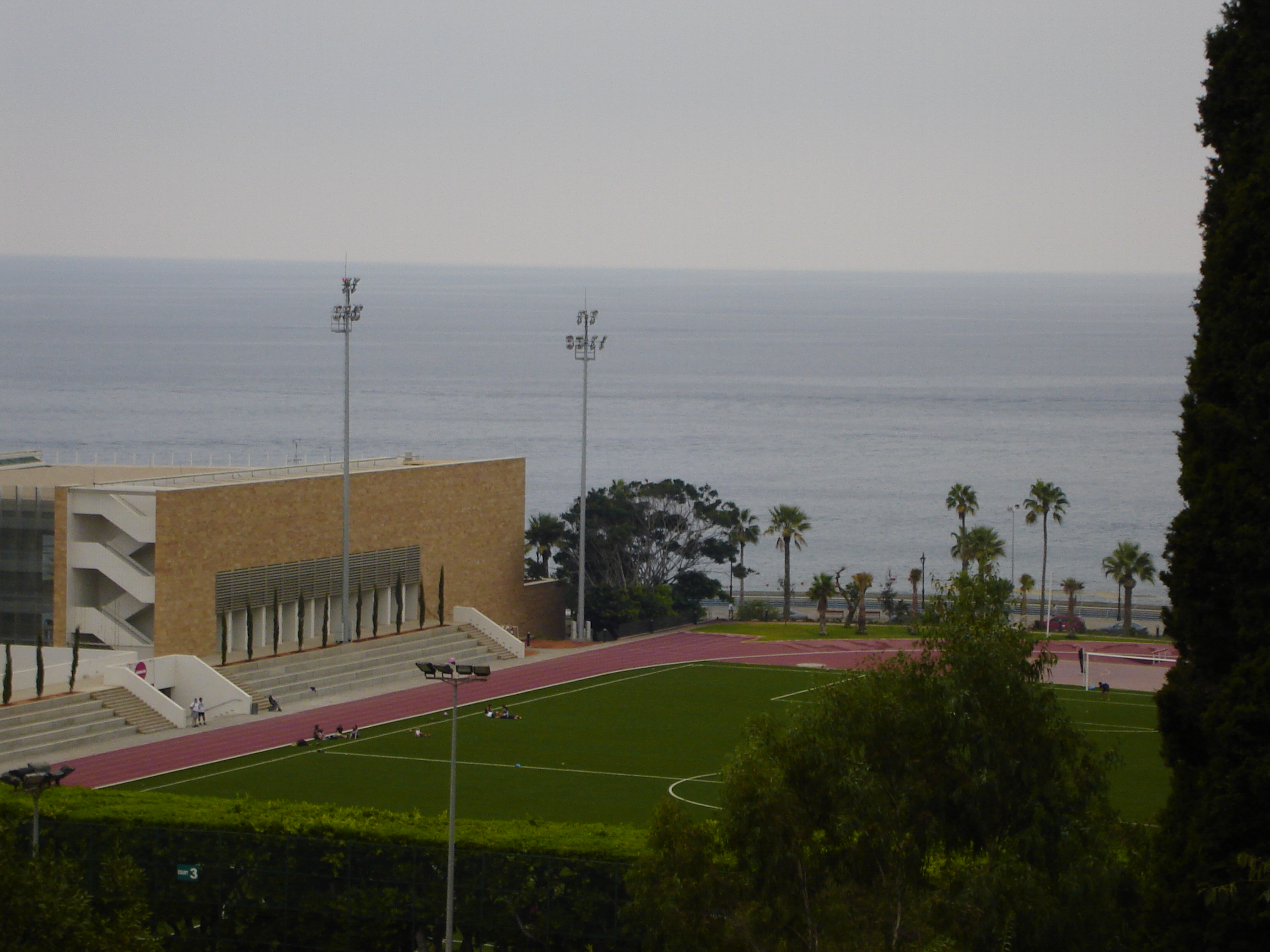
Football field at AUB lower campus

The 61-acre (250,000 m^{2}) American University of Beirut campus is on a hill overlooking the Mediterranean Sea on one side and bordering Bliss Street on the other. AUB's campus in Ras Beirut consists of 64 buildings, seven dormitories and several libraries. The university is also home to the Charles W. Hostler Student Centre, as well as an Archaeological Museum and a Natural History Museum. Students also have a range of recreational and research facilities, such as the 247-acre research farm and educational complex hosted by the Faculty of Agricultural and Food Sciences' Advancing Research Enabling Communities Center (AREC) in Beqaa, Lebanon. Its AUB Mediterraneo campus is in Paphos, Cyprus.

The Kamal A. Shair Central Research Science Laboratory is also part of the AUB campus. Functioning as a shared research facility it covers an area of around 400-square-metre (4,300 sq ft) and houses over 40 instruments across six main sections: Bioscience, Chromatography, Magnetoscience, Materials Science, Microscopy and Imaging, as well as Spectrophotometry.

The Dar Al-Handasah Architecture Building was first dedicated in 2007. It reopened in 2022 after being renovated, with new teaching spaces, laboratories, studios, lecture halls, exhibition and archive spaces.

The Hostler Student Centre opened on 23 May 2008, offering students an indoor 25-metre swimming pool and a 280-seat auditorium. The facility also comprises health and fitness rooms, as well as multi-sports and squash courts.

In 1950, AUB’s Animal Care Facility was established and supports approved research and teaching involving animals.

== Faculties ==
- Faculty of Agricultural and Food Sciences (FAFS)
- Faculty of Arts and Sciences (FAS)
- Faculty of Health Sciences (FHS)
- Faculty of Medicine (FM)
- Rafic Hariri School of Nursing (HSON)
- Maroun Semaan Faculty of Engineering and Architecture (MSFEA)
- Suliman S. Olayan School of Business (OSB)
- School of Computing and Data Sciences (SCDS)

== Students ==
In fall 2018, there were over 9,000 students enrolled at AUB: 7,180 undergraduates and 1,922 graduate students.

== Academics ==
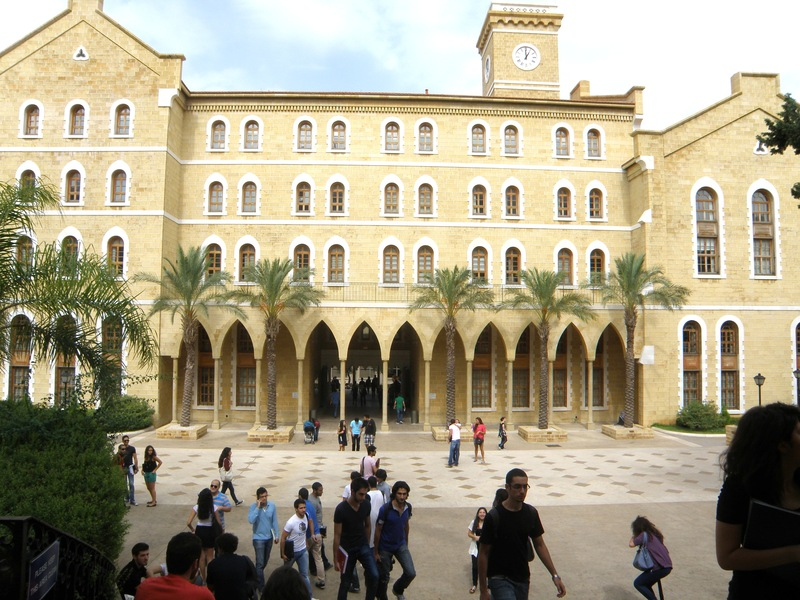
College Hall

AUB offers 141 undergraduate/graduate programs and 36 certificates and diplomas. In 2007, the university reintroduced PhD programs. AUB also includes dozens of research centers and institute that sponsor and promote research in a variety of fields.

== Rankings ==
The QS University Rankings 2026 place AUB at the 237th place worldwide and 6th place in the Arab world.

== AUB Medical Center ==
The AUB Medical Centre (AUBMC) operates as a private, non-profit teaching facility affiliated with the Faculty of Medicine. AUBMC, which is accredited by the Joint Commission International (JCIA), includes a 420-bed hospital and offers comprehensive tertiary/quaternary medical care and referral services in a wide range of specialties and medical, nursing, and paramedical training programs at the undergraduate and post-graduate levels.

Throughout its history, the AUB Medical Center, which was formerly known as the American University Hospital (AUH), has played a critical role in caring for the victims of regional and local conflicts. It provided care for the sick and wounded during World War I and World War II, the Lebanese Civil War, and the Palestinian conflict. In recent years, it has provided care for a number of Syrian refugees at the Medical Center in Beirut, at partner hospitals, and at mobile clinics.

Since 1905, AUB's medical services have included a nursing school. In 2008, the American Association of Colleges of Nursing (AACN) invited AUB's Rafic Hariri School of Nursing to become a full member, making it the first member of the AACN outside the United States. The American Nurses Credentialing Center's (ANCC) Magnet Recognition Program awarded AUBMC its prestigious Magnet designation on June 23, 2009. AUBMC is the first healthcare institution in the Middle East and the third in the world outside the United States to receive this award.

AUBMC now includes the Rafic Hariri School of Nursing Building, the Pierre Abu Khater Outpatient Building, the Wassef and Souad Sawwaf Building, the Medical Administration Building, the Halim and Aida Daniel Academic and Clinical Center, and the Inpatient and Outpatient hospital buildings.

The university is also home to several Clinical and Research Centers of Excellence such as the Mamdouha El-Sayed Bobst Breast Unit, the Naef K. Basile Cancer Institute, the Abu-Haidar Neuroscience Institute, the Children's Cancer Center of Lebanon (affiliated with St. Jude Children's Research Hospital in Memphis, Tennessee), the Moufid Farra Heart and Vascular Outpatient Center, the Nehme and Therese Tohme Multiple Sclerosis Center, and the Ahmad and Jamila Bizri Neuro Outpatient Center. They address health issues endemic to the Arab region such as cancer, heart and vascular diseases, diabetes, obesity, multiple sclerosis, blood disorders, and mental illness.

As part of the AUBMC 2020 vision, AUBMC held a groundbreaking ceremony for its New Medical Center Expansion Under the Patronage of President Michel Aoun in May 2019.

== American University of Beirut Press ==
American University of Beirut Press (also known as AUB Press) is a university press supported by American University of Beirut, Lebanon. The press specializes in the publication of monographs and edited collections pertaining to Lebanon and the Middle East.

The press in its current form can trace its origin back to 1969, when a formal publications office for the American University of Beirut—the Office of Publications—was created. In 2001, the university began publishing works under the "American University of Beirut Press" name, and in 2004, the Office of Publications was split into an Office of University Publications (later renamed the "Office of Communications") and the press itself, which answered to the Office of the Provost.

== University museums and collections ==
There are three museums at AUB: the Archaeological Museum, the Geology Museum, and the Natural History Museum.

The Archaeological Museum is the third oldest museum in the Near East. Its collection includes more than 16,000 objects and 10,000 coins and features pottery, prehistoric flint tools, bronze figurines, Phoenician and classical sculptures and bas-reliefs, Egyptian alabaster vases from Byblos, hairpins, and musical instruments. The museum has conducted excavations in Lebanon and Syria. The Society of the Friends of the AUB Museum organizes lectures, exhibits, and activities for children.

The Geology Museum includes rocks, minerals, and fossils from around the world.

The Natural History Museum houses a unique collection that represents the biodiversity of the area. It is especially well known for the Post Herbarium, which includes 63,000 specimens.

AUB's Archives and Special Collections includes important documents related to the founding of the Syrian Protestant College in 1866 and also many materials (documents, maps, photographs, etc.) of interest to scholars of Lebanon and the region including the Beirut Codex; a New Testament in Syriac, dating back to the ninth or tenth century; the E. W. Blatchford Collection (photographs of the Middle East, Europe, and North Africa taken between 1880 and 1900); and political and cultural posters dating back to the 1940s.

The American University of Beirut has embarked upon a new initiative (AUB Art Galleries and Collections) to play an active role in promoting fine and contemporary art in the region. The very first step taken in this new direction coincided with a donation of Samir Saleeby to AUB. The Rose and Shaheen Saleeby Collection includes paintings by artists of different generations, ranging from Khalil Saleeby (1870–1928) and Cesar Gemayal (1898–1958) to Omar Onsi (1901–1969) and Saliba Douaihy (1912–1994). It also features works by Haidar Hamaoui (b. 1937), Chucrallah Fattouh (b. 1956), and Robert Khoury (b. 1923). The Saleeby donation is the cornerstone upon which AUB will establish a comprehensive collection of modern and contemporary art from the region. The new initiative commenced with the launching of new art spaces located in and around AUB campus: the Rose and Shaheen Saleeby Museum in Sidani Street and the Byblos Bank Art Gallery, in Ada Dodge Hall (on campus).

The AUB curates the Palestinian Oral History Archive (POHA), an Oral history preservation project. Other notable Palestinian oral history archives are the Palestinian Oral History Map, Columbia University's Oral History Project in New York, Duke University's Palestinian Oral History Project, the Palestinian Rural History Project, Palestine Remembered, and Zochrot.

== Libraries ==
=== University libraries ===
The university libraries include:

- Nami Jafet Memorial Library
- Engineering and Architecture Library
- Saab Medical Library serves the AUB Faculty of Medicine and Medical Center, Faculty of Health Sciences, the Rafic Hariri School of Nursing, in addition to the entire AUB campus.
- Science and Agriculture Library.

The University Libraries are home to a collection that consists of:

- Print titles: 412,775 (books); 5,776 (periodicals)
- Print volumes: 505,548 (books); 162,727 (periodicals)
- Electronic titles (including open access): 1,098,491 (books); 138,430 (periodicals)
- Databases (paid subscriptions): 262
- Print books purchased/added: 7,243 titles / 8,380 volumes
- Gift/Exchange books added: 4,136 titles / 5,048 volumes
- Manuscripts: 1,373 titles / 1,408 volumes
- Maps: 1,684 titles / 2,027 volumes
- University archives: 940 linear feet / 2,720 archival boxes
- Microform items: 11,487 titles / 33,265 volumes
- Film and video titles: 3,544 titles / 4,629 volumes
- Audio recordings: 456 titles / 740 volumes

== Newspaper ==
AUB Outlook is a student newspaper circulated on campus grounds and online. It was established in 1949 and gained official status on July 15, 1957 by a license given to AUB under order no.113 issued by the Lebanese Minister of Information. Outlook is not affiliated politically and strives to not be biased toward any sect, religion, race, or ethnicity. It is run by students and is independent from the direct control of the university with an editorial board of at least 12 members appointed annually.

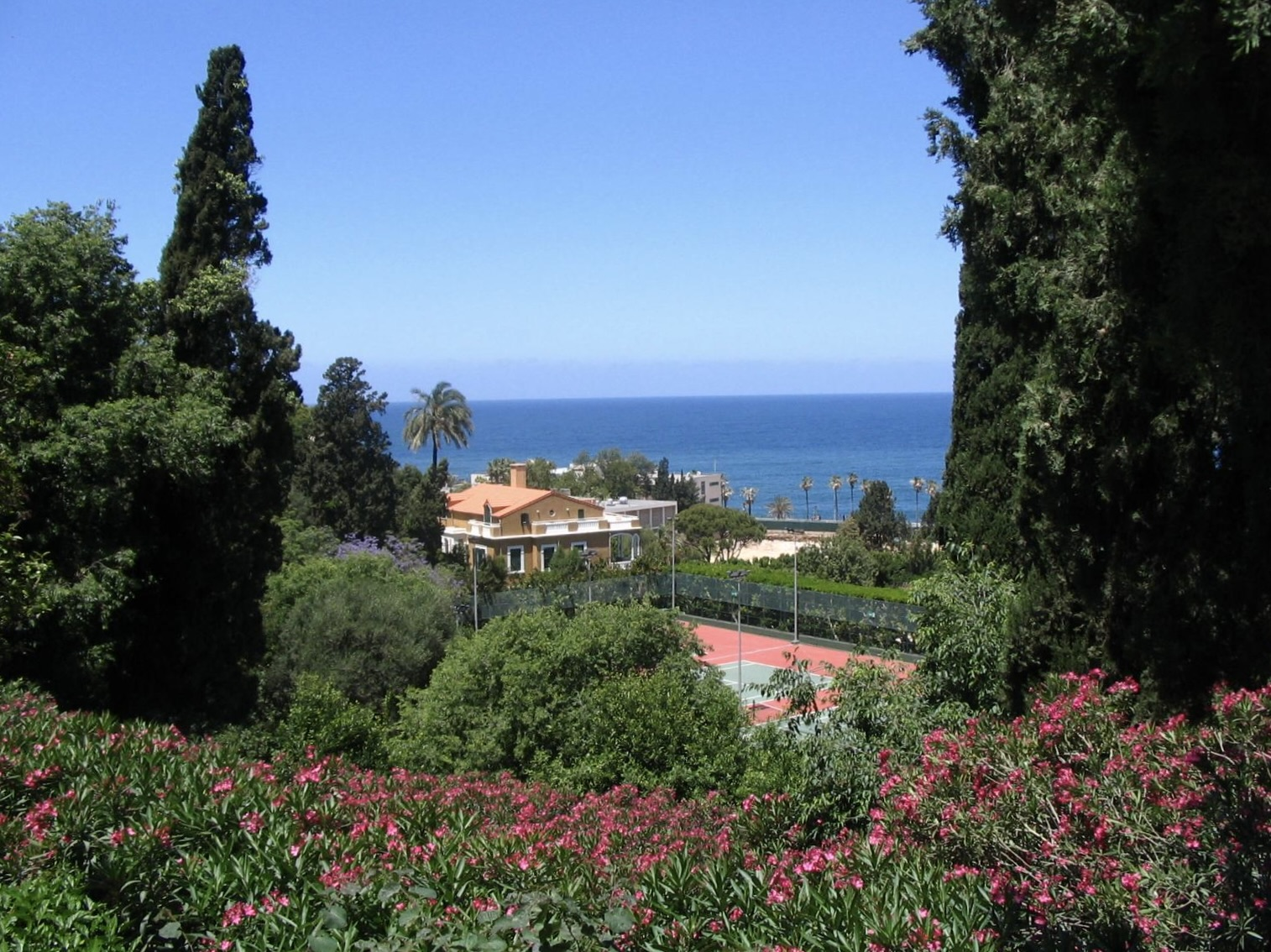
Looking northwest across the campus towards the Mediterranean Sea

== Accreditation ==
AUB was granted institutional accreditation in June 2004 by the Commission on Higher Education of the Middle States Association of Colleges and Schools. The university's accreditation was reaffirmed in 2009 and again in 2016 and 2019.

In September 2006, the Council on Education for Public Health (CEPH) accredited the Graduate Public Health Program in the Faculty of Health Sciences (FHS). The program was reaccredited in 2012 for seven years. The AUB Graduate Public Health Program is the first CEPH-accredited public health program outside the North American continent and the only CEPH-accredited public health program in the Arab world, Asia, and Africa.

The Commission on Collegiate Nursing Education (CCNE) accredited AUB's Rafic Hariri School of Nursing's BSN and MSN programs on October 13, 2007. The accreditation was reaffirmed in 2012.

In April 2009, the Association to Advance Collegiate Schools of Business (AACSB) accredited the Suliman S. Olayan School of Business (OSB). The accreditation was reaffirmed in 2014. AACSB is the leading international accrediting agency for undergraduate, master's, and doctoral degree programs in business administration and accounting. Less than five percent of business schools worldwide have earned AACSB International accreditation.

The Maroun Semaan Faculty of Engineering and Architecture at the American University of Beirut received accreditation for its undergraduate BE civil engineering, BE computer and communications engineering, BE in electrical and computer engineering, and BE in mechanical engineering programs from the Accreditation Board for Engineering and Technology (ABET) in 2008. The accreditation was reaffirmed in 2016. The undergraduate program in chemical engineering was accredited in 2013.

The Faculty of Agricultural and Food Sciences' undergraduate Nutrition and Dietetics Coordinated Program (NDCP) was accredited by the Accreditation Council for Education in Nutrition and Dietetics (ACEND) in 2013. It was reaccredited in 2017.

== Partnerships ==
Student exchange agreements exist with Télécom Paris and the Geneva Graduate Institute.

== Notable alumni ==
AUB has 64,417 living alumni. They reside in more than 120 countries.

According to an AUB press release from 2010, the university organized a literary festival to celebrate "the works of more than 60 world-renowned authors who count among its alumni." The release also notes that hundreds of esteemed authors have graduated from AUB since its founding in 1866, and a booklet was prepared with short biographies of about 250 authors who are AUB alumni.

20 AUB graduates or former students were delegates to the signing of the United Nations Charter in San Francisco in 1945, including notable alumna Angela Jurdak Khoury, Lebanon's first woman diplomat. During its 150th celebration in 2016, the university identified "History Makers" – men and women who have distinguished themselves in the areas of Leading, Innovating, and Serving by their accomplishments as scholars, politicians, artists, and in many other fields as well.

The most notable alumna of the American University of Beirut is Angela Jurdak Khoury, who completed her undergraduate studies in 1937 and her master's degree in 1938. She is the first known woman to graduate with a master's degree from the American University of Beirut. She went on to become Lebanon's first woman diplomat and was awarded the National Order of the Cedar, Lebanon's highest ranking state award, in 1959.

Many other notable alumnae reached high positions in various fields. Some of these women are listed and described below:

- Reem Acra, an American University of Beirut business graduate that was awarded with the Fashion Design Department's award and Ellis Island award;
- Zaha Hadid, who studied mathematics at the American University of Beirut. She received an Honorary Degree from AUB, and one of her completed projects is the Issam Fares Institute for Public Policy and International Affairs Building which is currently present at AUB;
- Rula Ghani, a former first lady of Afghanistan listed as the Top 100 world's most influential people by Times magazine;
- Ghada El Samman is a famous Arab writer. She received her master's degree from the American University of Beirut, and founded her own publishing house;
- Karimeh Abbud, born in 1893 and graduated with a degree in Arabic Literature. She is considered to be the first female photographer in the Arab world. She received her first camera as a gift when she was 17 years old. Moreover, her work includes hundreds of photos regarding the Palestinian History;
- Dr. Amal Mudallali graduated from the American University of Beirut with a degree in political science. She is the first Lebanese female to ever become Lebanon's UN ambassador;
- Edvick Jureidini Shayboub, women's rights activist, author, and radio journalist, well known for her dedication and fight for women's rights, both locally and globally;
- Lina Abu Akleh, a human rights advocate.
- Ali T. Taher, hematologist and physician-scientist.

== See also ==
- Alumni of the American University of Beirut
- American University (disambiguation) for a list of similarly named institutions
- The American University in Cairo (AUC)
- American University of Sharjah (AUS)
- American University of Iraq - Baghdad (AUB)
- American University of Iraq - Sulaimani (AUI)
- Education in the Ottoman Empire
