= Halsey (surname) =

Halsey is an English surname with several possible origins. It may be derived from Alsa, in Stansted Mountfitchet, Essex, England. This place name was once known as Assey, and was recorded as Alsiesheye in 1268. Another possibility is that the name is derived from Halsway, in Somerset, England. The latter place name is derived from the Old English word elements hals ("neck") and weg ("way", "road").

== People ==
- A. H. Halsey (1923–2014), British sociologist
- Alan Halsey (1949–2022), British poet
- Alice Halsey (born 2014), American actress
- Anthony P. Halsey (1794–1863), American banker
- Brad Halsey (1981–2014), Major League Baseball pitcher
- Brandon Halsey (born 1986), American mixed martial artist
- Bret Halsey (soccer) (born 2000), American soccer player
- Brett Halsey (born 1933), American film actor
- Danny Halsey (born 1988), English motorcycle speedway rider
- David Halsey (1919–2009), Bishop of Carlisle (1972–1989)
- Delbert W. Halsey (1919–1942), United States Navy officer and Navy Cross recipient
- Don P. Halsey (1870–1938), American politician
- Edmund Halsey (died 1729), British brewer and Whig politician
- Edwin A. Halsey (1881–1945), American politician
- Elmer Halsey (1861–1943), American politician
- Forrest Halsey (1877–1949), American screenwriter
- Francis Whiting Halsey (1851–1919), American journalist and historian
- Frederick A. Halsey (1856–1935), American mechanical engineer and economist
- Frederick Halsey (1839–1927), English politician
- George A. Halsey (1827–1894), American Republican Party politician
- Hugh Halsey (1794–1858), NYS Surveyor General 1845–1847
- Jaime Halsey (born 1979), British former Olympic trampolinist
- James M. Halsey (1825–1899), American farmer, merchant, and politician
- Jehiel H. Halsey (1788–1867), U.S. Representative from New York
- Jim Halsey (born 1930), American artist manager, agent and impresario
- John Halsey (privateer) (died 1708), colonial American privateer
- John Halsey (musician) (born 1945), English drummer
- Lauren Halsey (born 1987), American artist
- Leroy J. Halsey (1812–1896), American Presbyterian scholar and author
- Lionel Halsey (1872–1948), British Royal Navy officer
- Louis Halsey (born 1929), English composer, arranger and choral conductor
- Margaret Halsey (1910–1997), American writer
- Mark Halsey (born 1961), English football referee
- Milton B. Halsey (1894–1990), United States Army officer
- Neal Halsey (born 1945), American pediatrician
- Nicholas Halsey (born 1948), heir to the Halsey Baronetcy
- Nicoll Halsey (1782–1865), American politician
- Richard Halsey (born 1940), American film editor
- Sherman Halsey (1957–2013), American music video and television director
- Silas Halsey (1743–1832), U.S. Representative from New York
- Simon Halsey (born 1958), English choral conductor
- Stephen A. Halsey (1798–1875), American fur trader and landowner
- Sir Thomas Halsey, 3rd Baronet (1898–1970), English cricketer and naval officer
- Thomas Jefferson Halsey (1863–1951), American Representative from Missouri
- Thomas Plumer Halsey (1815–1854), British MP for Hertfordshire (1846–1854)
- Sir Walter Halsey, 2nd Baronet (1868–1950), British Army officer
- William F. Halsey Sr. (1853–1920), USN officer
- William Halsey Jr. (1882–1959), USN naval aviator and admiral in World War II
- William Halsey (mayor) (1770–1843), first mayor of Newark, New Jersey
- The Halsey baronets, created in 1920

== Fictional characters ==
- Dr. Catherine Elizabeth Halsey, scientist and creator of the Spartan II project in the Halo series of books and video games.
- Dr. Allan Halsey, Dean of the Medical School at Miskatonic University in H. P. Lovecraft's short story "Herbert West–Reanimator".
- Charles Halsey, President of the United States in The Outer Limits episode "Trial by Fire".
- Lt. Halsey, munitions specialist of shuttle Independence in Armageddon
- Admiral Halsey of the Planetary Union in The Orville
- Elizabeth Halsey, the titular bad teacher in Bad Teacher.
