= Halsey =

Halsey may refer to:

== People ==
=== Surname ===
- Halsey (surname)
- Halsey baronets, a title in the Baronetage of the United Kingdom

=== Given name ===
- Halsey Beshears (born 1971), American politician
- Halsey J. Boardman (1834–1900), American lawyer and politician
- Halsey Frank, American attorney
- Halsey Hall (1898–1977), American sports reporter and announcer
- Halsey Chase Herreshoff (born 1933), American naval architect
- Halsey Minor (born 1964), American businessman
- Halsey K. Mohr (1883–1942), American composer and lyricist
- Halsey Ricardo (1854–1928), English architect and designer
- Halsey Rodman (born 1973), American artist
- Halsey Royden (1928–1993), American mathematician
- Halsey Stevens (1908–1989), American music professor, biographer, and composer
- Halsey William Wilson (1868–1954), American publisher

=== Other ===
- Halsey (singer) (born 1994), American singer and songwriter, actress

== Places in the United States ==
- Halsey, Oregon, city in Linn County
- Halsey, Nebraska, village in Blaine and Thomas counties
- Halsey, Wisconsin, town in Marathon County
- Halsey Brook, a creek in East Jewett, New York
- Halsey Street (disambiguation)

== Other uses ==
- USS Halsey, several United States Navy vessels
- "Uncle Albert/Admiral Halsey", Paul McCartney song referring to a U.S. Admiral
- Halsey Field House, multi-purpose arena at the United States Naval Academy, Annapolis, Maryland
- Halsey Institute of Contemporary Art, contemporary art institute within the School of the Arts at the College of Charleston, South Carolina
- Halsey, a menswear fashion company started by Robbie Rogers

== See also ==
- Halsey House (disambiguation)
