= Thomas Halsey =

Thomas Halsey may refer to:

- Thomas Halsey (1655–1715), English MP for Hertfordshire 1685, 1695, 1698, 1701–05, 1708
- Thomas Halsey (died 1788) (c.1731–1788), English MP for Hertfordshire 1768–84
- Thomas Plumer Halsey (1815–1854), MP for Hertfordshire 1846–54
- Frederick Halsey (Sir Thomas Frederick Halsey, 1839–1927), son of Thomas Plumer Halsey, MP for Hertfordshire 1874–85 and Watford 1885–1906
- Thomas Jefferson Halsey (1863–1951), United States Representative from Missouri
- Sir Thomas Halsey, 3rd Baronet (1898–1970), English cricketer and Royal Navy officer, grandson of Sir Thomas Frederick Halsey
- Thomas Halsey (1591–1679) English immigrant to New York, co-founder of Southampton, New York
