= James Bisset =

James Bisset may refer to:

- James Bisset (artist) (c.1762–1832), Scottish-born artist, manufacturer, art dealer and poet
- James Bisset (Royal Navy officer) (1760–1824), Scottish commander in the Royal Navy
- James Bisset (mayor) (1836–1919), architect, civil engineer and mayor of Wynberg, South Africa
- James Gordon Partridge Bisset (1883–1967), British merchant sea captain
- James Bisset (minister) (1795–1872), minister of the Church of Scotland

== See also ==
- James Bissett (disambiguation)
