= John Halsey =

John Halsey may refer to:

- John Halsey (privateer) (c. 1662–1708), colonial American privateer and later pirate
- John Halsey (musician) (born 1945), English rock drummer
- Sir John Walter Brooke Halsey, 4th Baronet (born 1933) of the Halsey baronets
- John v.H. Halsey (born 1952), founder of the Peconic Land Trust

== See also ==
- Halsey (disambiguation)
