= Aaron Cleveland =

American clergyman

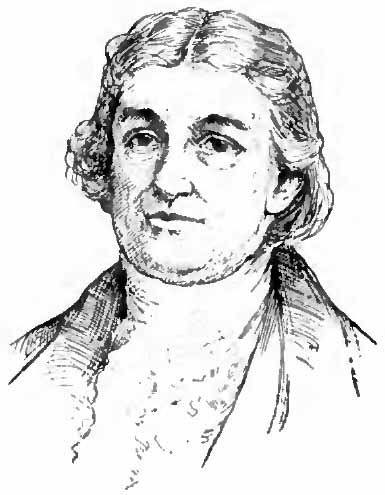
- Born: 29 October 1715
- Died: 11 August 1757 (aged 41)
- Church: Presbyterian
- Congregations served: St. Matthew's United Church (Halifax)

Signature
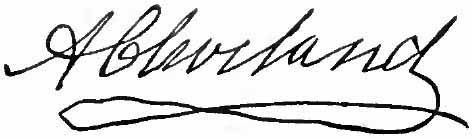

Aaron Cleveland (29 October 1715 – 11 August 1757, Philadelphia) was a clergyman. He established the first Presbyterian church in Canada. He was a great-great-grandfather of United States President Grover Cleveland.

== Biography ==
His father was also named Aaron Cleveland. At the time of Aaron's birth, his father was making a modest living as a publican in Cambridge, Massachusetts, where Aaron was born, and was also working in construction. His father would later become a militia captain and a man of some wealth. The son graduated from Harvard in 1735. He was a man of great physical strength and activity, and the best skater, swimmer, and wrestler in the college in his day. In 1739, he was made pastor of the church in Haddam, Connecticut, where his father possessed landed property. In the same year, he also married Susannah, the daughter of Aaron Porter of Medford, Massachusetts.

The preaching of George Whitefield produced a great impression on his mind and led to subsequent changes in his religion. In 1747, he moved to Massachusetts, where he was pastor of South Church in Malden until 1750, when he took an active part in the emigration from New England for the settlement of Nova Scotia. In Halifax in 1750, he established the first Presbyterian church in Canada. The Scottish Calvinists became its directors, overriding the New Englanders, and in 1755 Cleveland went to London, where he received holy orders.

Cleveland returned to America as a missionary of the Society for the Propagation of the Gospel in Foreign Parts. During the return voyage the vessel ran aground at Nantucket Shoals, and he lent his muscular aid to the sailors with good results, but a wave inflicted an injury upon his strong frame, from the effects of which he never recovered. He was rector of the church in Newcastle, Delaware, but visiting Philadelphia for medical treatment, when he died under the hospitable roof of his friend, Benjamin Franklin. A tribute to his character appeared in Franklin's newspaper, the Pennsylvania Gazette, on August 18, 1757:

On Thursday last (11th) died here Rev. Mr. Cleveland, lately appointed to the Mission at Newcastle by the Society for propagating the Gospel. As he was a gentleman of humane and pious disposition, indefatigable in his ministry, easy and affable in his conversation, open and sincere in his friendship, and above every species of meanness and dissimulation, his death is greatly lamented by all who knew him as a loss to the Church of Christ in general, and in particular to that congregation who had proposed to themselves so much satisfaction from his late appointment among them, agreeably to their own earnest request.

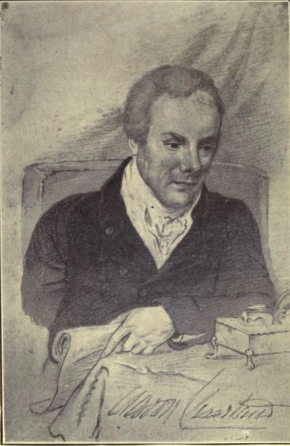
Rev Aaron Cleveland, earliest image of Protestant minister in Canada

Aaron Cleveland was the first minister for St. Matthew's United Church (Halifax) in Halifax, Nova Scotia. He is the great-great-grandfather of the president of United States, Grover Cleveland.

== Family ==
While in England, Aaron Cleveland became satisfied that the original spelling of the family name was “Cleveland,” as he and his descendants have since written it, while other American branches of the family generally retain the form “Cleaveland.”

As noted above, in 1739 Aaron Cleveland married Susannah Porter, who in addition to being the daughter of Aaron Porter was the granddaughter of Major Sewall of Salem, Massachusetts. Among their descendants were:

- Stephen Cleveland (1740 East Haddam, Connecticut – 1801 Salem, Massachusetts), a naval officer. He went to sea at the age of fourteen, was taken by a British press-gang in Boston in 1756, and kept in service until 1763. Soon after the Declaration of Independence he was commissioned a captain in the navy, and brought from Bordeaux valuable munitions of war. His commission is supposed to have been the earliest issued by the American government.
- Stephen's son, Richard Jeffry Cleveland, a U. S. vice-consul at Havana, Cuba, 1829–1834. He wrote an autobiographical work entitled Voyages and Commercial Enterprises (Boston, 1850). Richard Jeffry's son Horace Cleveland published Voyages of a Merchant Navigator of the past days, compiled from the journals and letters of his father, and was a noted landscape designer. Richard Jeffry's son Henry Russell Cleveland (1809 – 12 June 1843) was an author. He graduated at Harvard in 1827, and became one of the band called the “Five of Clubs,” his associates being Charles Sumner, Henry Wadsworth Longfellow, Cornelius C. Felton, and George S. Hillard. He published: an edition of Sallust's works, with English notes (New York); Remarks on the Classical Education of Boys, by a Teacher (1834); Life of Henry Hudson in Jared Sparks's “American Biographies” series; and review articles and addresses. A selection from his writings, with a memoir by George S. Hillard, was printed privately (Boston, 1844).
- Aaron Cleveland (3 February 1744 Haddam, Connecticut – 21 September 1815), who pursued multiple vocations. His father's early death deprived him of the privilege of a college education, but he pursued his studies while apprenticed to a manufacturer in Norwich, Connecticut. At the age of nineteen, he produced a poem, “The Philosopher and Boy,” in which he refers to his botanical pursuits. In 1779, he was a member of the provincial legislature of Connecticut. Late in life, he became a Congregational pastor near Hartford, Connecticut. Aaron Jr., was twice married. Aaron Jr.'s son William Cleveland (b. 20 December 1770) was the grandfather of President Grover Cleveland. Aaron Jr.'s son Charles Cleveland (21 June 1772 Norwich, Connecticut – 5 June 1872 Boston), after civil-service and business careers, ultimately became a clergyman in Boston noted for his philanthropic activities. Aaron's daughter Sarah married David Low Dodge, founder of the New York Peace Society.
