= Archibald Gray =

Archibald, Arch or Archie Gray may refer to:

- Archibald Gray (minister) (before 1770–1831), Canadian Presbyterian minister
- Archie Gray (footballer, born 1877) (1877–1943), Scottish football defender
- Sir Archibald Gray (dermatologist) (1880–1967), English dermatologist
- Arch Gray, American state legislator for district 35 in the 1965 128th Georgia General Assembly
- Archie Gray (born 2006), English football midfielder
