= Arthur William La Touche Bisset =

British military officer (1892–1956)

Vice-Admiral Arthur William La Touche Bisset CB CBE
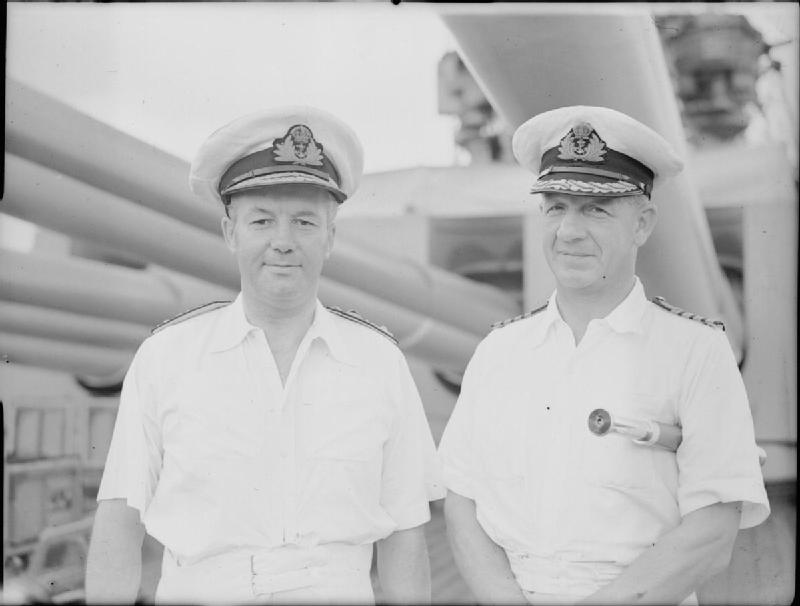
- La Touche Bisset (left) with Thomas Halsey, Flag Captain of HMS King George V, July 1943.
- Born: 6 April 1892; Mumbai
- Died: 23 June 1956 (aged 64); Gerrards Cross, Buckinghamshire, United Kingdom
- Spouse: Margaret Frances McNeill Grant
- Military career
- Allegiance: United Kingdom
- Branch: Royal Navy
- Service years: 1905–1945
- Rank: Vice-Admiral
- Commands: HMS Ark Royal, HMS Shropshire, HMS Formidable, HMS Illustrious, Force H
- Conflicts: Cape Matapan, Operation Tungsten

Arthur William La Touche Bisset (6 April 1892 - 23 June 1956) was a Royal Navy officer, active in both World Wars and becoming a noted commander of aircraft carriers and carrier formations in home waters, the Mediterranean and (briefly) the Indian Ocean during the second conflict.

== Life ==
Born in Mumbai and baptised in Malabar on 17 May 1892, he was the only son of Colonel Sir William Sinclair Smith Bisset (1843–1916) and his wife Henrietta Mary La Touche (1875-1945), making him grandson to James Bisset. His father retired from the India Office early in 1901 and on the night of that year's census Arthur was living with his parents, two sisters, a cousin and seven servants at The Maples, Ventnor, Isle of Wight.

He joined the Navy as a Midshipman on 15 January 1905 and held that rank aboard HMS Doris at Gibraltar as part of the Atlantic Fleet on the night of the 1911 census, as well as on HMS Hercules (1911–1912). He was promoted to Sub-Lieutenant on 15 October 1912 and Lieutenant on 15 August 1913. He was posted for training aboard HMS Leander and HMS King George V (1912–1915) and at shore establishments Excellent and Vivid (1915–1916). He then served aboard HMS Devonshire (1916–1917) and HMS Iron Duke (1917–1919). On 17 July 1918 at St John's, Edinburgh he married Margaret Frances McNeill Grant, daughter of Laura McNeill Packer and her husband MacCallum Grant.

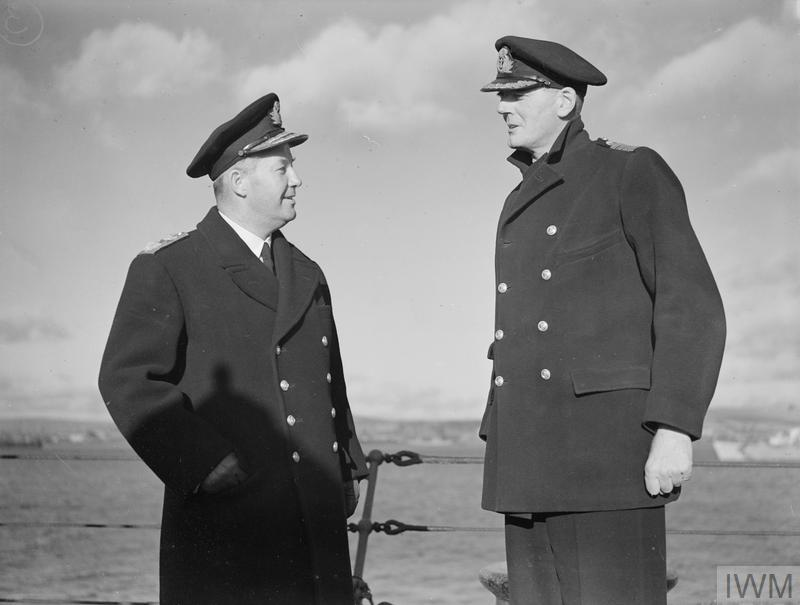
La Touche Bisset (left) with Guy Russell, Captain of HMS Duke of York, Rosyth, 7 November 1943

He returned to training post-war, including the Senior Officers' War Course in 1935. Promotion to Lieutenant Commander came on 15 August 1921, to Commander on 31 December 1926 and Captain on 31 December 1932. His first command was HMS Ark Royal (1934–1935), followed by a period as director of physical training and sport at HMS Victory (1935–1937) before command of HMS Shropshire (1937–1939) and HMS Formidable (1940–1942). 1942 brought a mention in despatches on 3 February for his command of Formidable at the Battle of Cape Matapan and promotion to Rear Admiral on 28 July. He was then posted to Canada before becoming second-in-command of Force H on 1 May 1943, flying his flag on HMS Warspite until being put in command of HMS Illustrious for a month from 23 August. Next he was appointed to the Naval Air Station, Indian Ocean and then Escort Carriers, Eastern Fleet (September 1943-February 1944), briefly returning to the Mediterranean for fifteen days as head of Force H (13-28 October).

On 18 January 1944 he was mentioned in despatches a second time to mark the dissolution of Force H and the following month he returned to the Home Fleet, again commanding escort carriers. In April 1944 he headed Force Two (Note: Consisting of four aircraft carriers and fourteen other ships, including his flagship the light cruiser HMS Royalist.) in Operation Tungsten. and that July he was made an Additional Member of the Military Division of the Order of the British Empire for "distinguished service in command of operations against enemy shipping in Northern Waters successfully carried out by Carrier borne aircraft", (Note: This referred to Operation Potluck, intended as a diversion from continuing efforts to sink the Tirpitz.) rising to a Commander in that Order on 1 January 1945.

He was placed on the retired list on health grounds in 1945 and promoted to his final rank of Vice Admiral the following year. In 1949 his third daughter Mary Elizabeth Bisset married Oliver William Lough, a teacher and demobbed Indian Army Temporary Major. Arthur William died in Gerrards Cross in 1956.
