= James Maitland =

James Maitland may refer to:

- James Maitland of Lethington (born 1568)
- James Maitland, 7th Earl of Lauderdale (1718–1789)
- James Maitland, 8th Earl of Lauderdale (1759–1839)
- James Maitland, 9th Earl of Lauderdale (1784–1860)
- James Maitland (minister) (1797–1872), minister of the Church of Scotland
- James Ramsay-Gibson-Maitland (1848–1897), Scottish aquaculturist
- James Maitland Clarke, Canadian politician

== See also ==
- James Stewart (1908–1997), American actor, born James Maitland Stewart
