= Elizabeth Clementine Stedman =

American poet (1810–1889)

Elizabeth Clementine Dodge Stedman
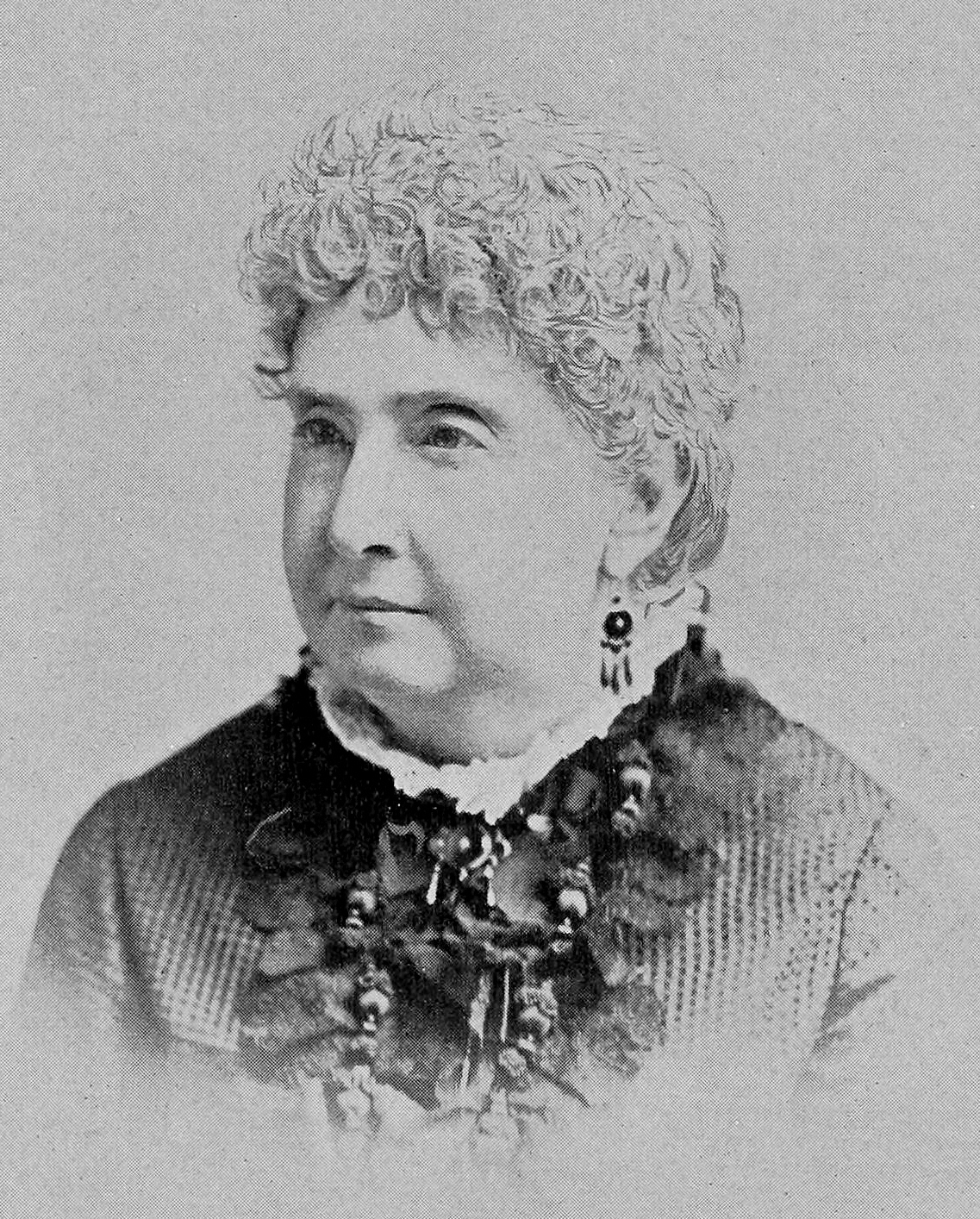
- Born: Elizabeth Clementine Dodge; December 10, 1810; New York City, U.S.
- Died: November 19, 1889 (aged 78); Summit, New Jersey, U.S.
- Occupation: Writer
- Spouses: Edmund Burke Stedman (m. 1830; died 1835); William Burnet Kinney (m. 1841; died 1880)
- Children: 4, including Edmund Clarence Stedman
- Relatives: David Low Dodge (father); William E. Dodge (brother)

Elizabeth Clementine Dodge Stedman (December 10, 1810 – November 19, 1889) was an American writer. She was the author of Felicita, a Metrical Romance (1855), Poems (1867), and Bianca Cappello, A Tragedy (1873).

== Biography ==
She was born Elizabeth Clementine Dodge in New York City on December 10, 1810. Her father was David Low Dodge, who helped establish the New York Peace Society. Her mother was Sarah Cleveland, the daughter of minister Aaron Cleveland. Her brother was William E. Dodge, noted abolitionist, Native American rights activist, past president of the National Temperance Society, and founding member of YMCA of the USA.

Elizabeth was a contributor to the Knickerbocker and to Blackwood's. During a 14-year stay in Europe she was a friend of Robert Browning and Elizabeth Barrett Browning. She published Felicita, a Metrical Romance (1855), Poems (1867), and Bianco Capello, A Tragedy (1873), written during her time abroad in Italy.

== Personal life ==
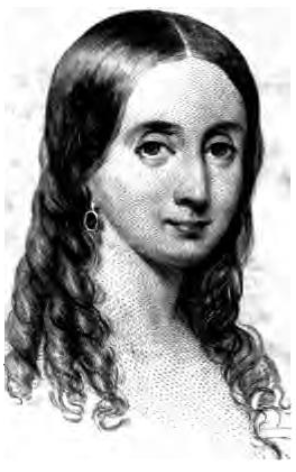
Elizabeth Clementine Kinney (1852)

She married Edmund Burke Stedman, a merchant from Hartford, Connecticut, in 1830 at age 19. He died of tuberculosis in December 1835. They had two sons, the eldest was the poet and critic Edmund Clarence Stedman.

In 1841, she married the U.S. diplomat and politician, William Burnet Kinney. They remained married until his death in 1880. They had two children:

- Elizabeth Clementine Kinney who married William Ingraham Kip Jr. (1840-1902), the rector of Good Samaritan Missions in San Francisco and the son of Episcopal bishop and missionary to California, William Ingraham Kip. They had four children, three of whom survived to adulthood: Elizabeth Clementine Kip (married Guy L. Eddie of the U.S. Army); Lawrence Kip; and Mary Burnet Kip (married to Dr. Ernest Franklin Robertson of Kansas City, KS).
- Mary Burnet Kinney.

Her great-great-grandsons are businesspeople Frederick R. Koch, Charles Koch, David Koch, and Bill Koch.

== Death ==
She died on November 19, 1889, in Summit, New Jersey, at the age of 78.
