= Edmund Clarence Stedman =

American poet (1833–1908)

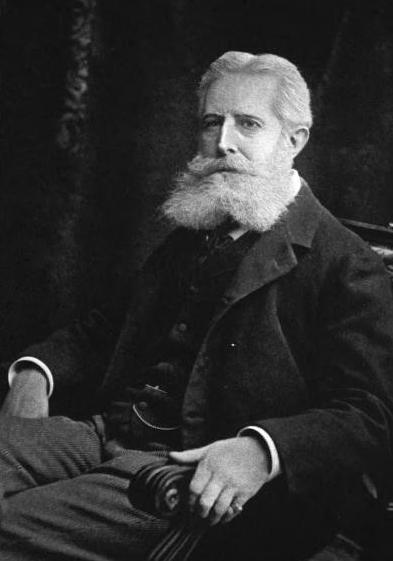
- Edmund Clarence Stedman, 1897
- Born: October 8, 1833; Hartford, Connecticut, U.S.
- Died: January 18, 1908 (aged 74); New York City, U.S.
- Education: Yale University (MA)
- Occupations: Poet; critic; essayist; banker; scientist
- Spouse: Laura Hyde Woolworth (m. 1853; died 1905)
- Children: 2
- Mother: Elizabeth Clementine Stedman
- Relatives: David Low Dodge (grandfather)

Signature
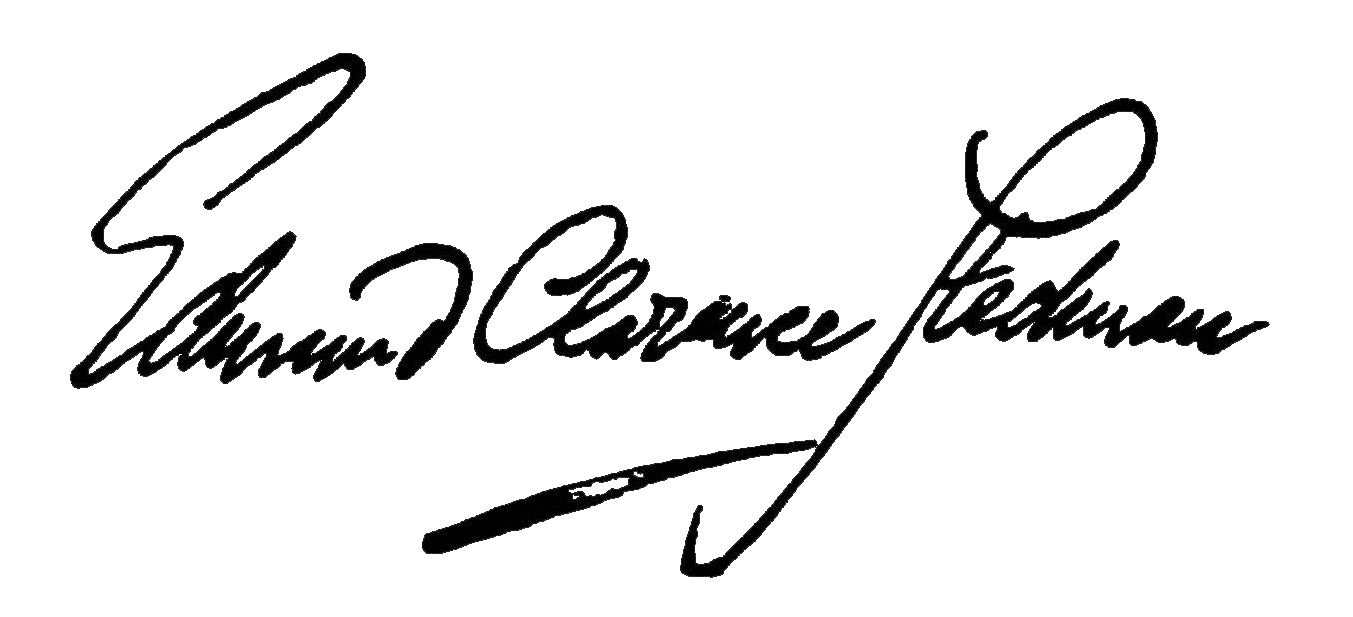

Edmund Clarence Stedman (October 8, 1833 – January 18, 1908) was an American poet, critic, essayist, banker, and scientist.

== Early life ==
Edmund Clarence Stedman was born in Hartford, Connecticut, on October 8, 1833; his father, Major Edmund Burke Stedman died of tuberculosis two years later in December 1835. By the following spring, his mother Elizabeth Clementine Stedman moved the boy and his younger brother to Plainfield, New Jersey, to live with her wealthy father, David Low Dodge.

Dodge, a Calvinist and pacifist, was strict, did not want to use his finances to support his grandchildren, and often physically punished the boys for bad behavior. Mrs. Stedman sold poems and stories to magazines including Graham's Magazine, Sartain's Magazine, The Knickerbocker, and Godey's Lady's Book for income. Eventually, the children were taken in by their paternal grandfather, Griffin Stedman, and his brother James in Norwich, Connecticut.

Stedman enrolled in Yale University in 1849 at the age of 16. Stedman studied two years at Yale University, but was suspended and did not return. Yale later restored him to the Class of 1853 and gave him the degree of Master of Arts.

== Career ==
=== Early career ===
After leaving Yale, he became a journalist for The Norwich Tribune and became an editor at the age of 19. In 1854, he moved to Winstead, Connecticut, and edited The Herald. He then moved to New York City in 1856 and joined the staff of the Tribune and then the World, for which latter paper he served as field correspondent during the first years of the Civil War. As opportunity offered, he studied law and was for a time private secretary to Attorney-General Bates at Washington, and was a member of the New York Stock Exchange in Wall Street from 1865 to 1900.

=== Literary career ===
His first book, Poems, Lyrical and Idyllic, appeared in 1860, followed by successive volumes of similar character, and by collected editions of his verse in 1873, 1884 and 1897. His longer poems are Alice of Monmouth: an Idyl of the Great War (1864); The Blameless Prince (1869), an allegory of good deeds, supposed to have been remotely suggested by the life of Prince Albert; and an elaborate commemorative ode on Nathaniel Hawthorne, read before the Harvard Phi Beta Kappa Society in 1877.

An idyllic atmosphere is the prevalent characteristic of his longer pieces, while the lyric tone is never absent from his songs, ballads and poems of reflection or fancy. As an editor he put forth a volume of Cameos from Walter Savage Landor (with Thomas Bailey Aldrich, 1874); a large Library of (selections from) American Literature (with Ellen M Hutchinson, 11 vols, 1888–1890); a Victorian Anthology (1895); and an American Anthology, 1787–1899 (1900); the two last-named volumes being ancillary to a detailed and comprehensive critical study in prose of the whole body of English poetry from 1837, and of American poetry of the 19th century.

This study appeared in separate chapters in Scribner's Monthly (which closed in 1881 and was relaunched the same year as the Century Magazine), and was reissued, with enlargements, in the volumes entitled Victorian Poets (1875; continued to the Jubilee year in the edition of 1887) and Poets of America (1885), the two works forming the most symmetrical body of literary criticism yet published in the United States. Their value is increased by the treatise on The Nature and Elements of Poetry (Boston, 1892) a work of great critical insight as well as technical knowledge.

Stedman edited, with Ellen M. Hutchinson, A Library of American Literature (eleven volumes, 1888–90); and, with George E. Woodberry, the Works of Edgar Allan Poe (ten volumes, 1895). After the death of James Russell Lowell, Stedman had perhaps the leading place among American poets and critics. In 1876, he was one of several poets who were gently mocked by Bayard Taylor in his verse parody The Echo Club and Other Literary Diversions.

In 1904, Edmund Clarence Stedman was one of the first seven chosen for membership in the American Academy of Arts and Letters.

=== Scientific career ===
In addition to his literary achievements, Stedman pursued scientific and technical endeavors. In 1879, he proposed a rigid airship inspired by the anatomy of a fish, with a framework of steel, brass, or copper tubing and a tractor propeller mounted on the craft's bow, later changed to an engine with two propellers suspended beneath the framework. The airship never was built, but its design foreshadowed that of the dirigibles of the early decades of the 20th century.

== Personal life ==
Stedman married Laura Hyde Woodworth on November 2, 1853. He had two sons.

Stedman died on January 18, 1908, in New York City from heart disease.

== Literature ==
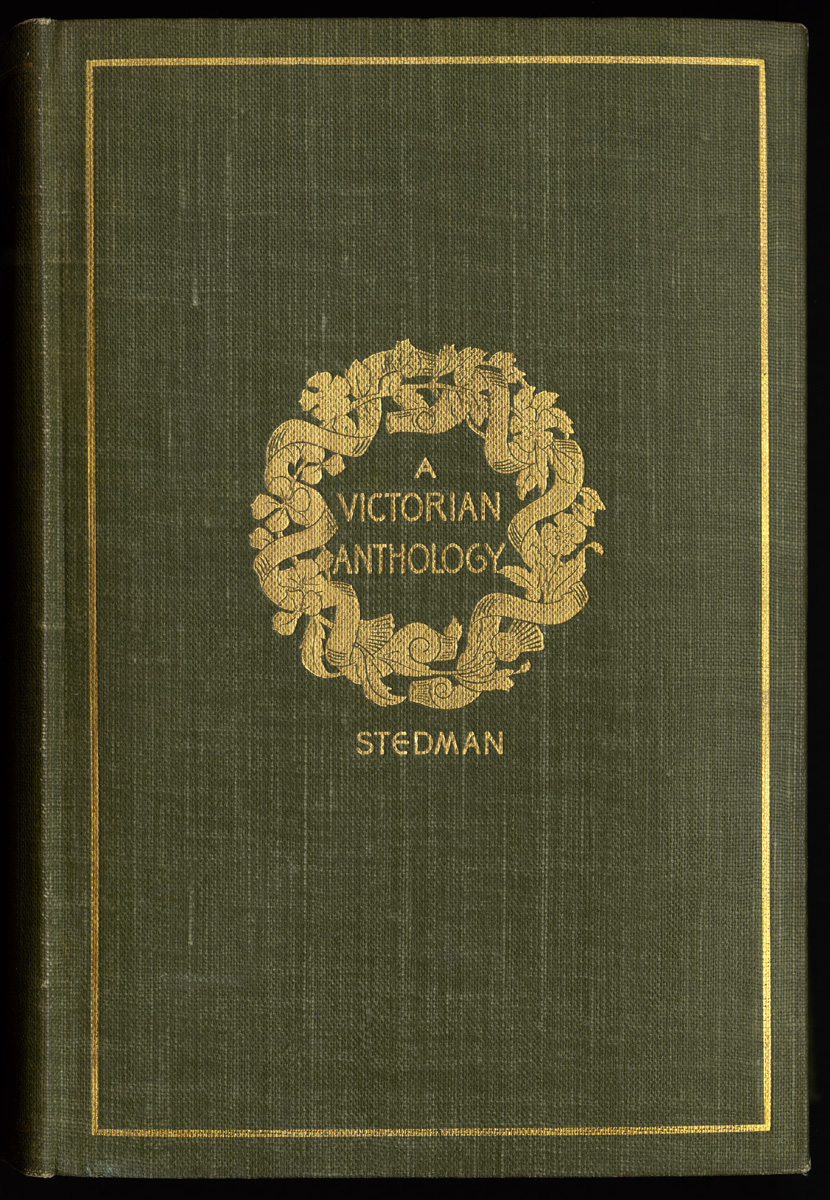
A Victorian Anthology, 1895

- A Victorian Anthology, 1837–1895 (1895)
- William Winter, Old Friends (New York, 1909)
- An American Anthology, 1787–1900 (Online Edition)
- Stedman and Mackay, A Library of American Literature (eleven volumes, New York: Charles L. Webster & Co., 1888–90)
- Stedman and Gould, Life and Letters of Edmund Clarence Stedman (two volumes, New York, 1910)
