= William Sinclair Smith Bisset =

British army officer and administrator

Colonel Sir William Sinclair Smith Bisset (23 November 1843 – 30 July 1916) was a British Army officer and colonial administrator.

== Life ==
Born in Aberdeen to James Bisset and his second wife Elizabeth Sinclair Smith, he was educated at the Royal Military Academy, Woolwich before becoming an officer in the Royal Engineers in 1863, gaining promotion to captain in 1877. He initially held some junior posts linked to managing and building the railways of British India before serving in the Second Anglo-Afghan War, winning a mention in despatches and promotion to Brevet Major, made substantive in 1881.

Though he remained in the Army after the war (rising to lieutenant colonel in 1890 and his final rank of colonel in 1895), what was effectively a civil service career followed, as manager of the Rajputana-Malwa Railway (1875–1884), agent of the Bombay, Baroda and Central India Railway (1884–1893), secretary to the Government of India, Public Works Department (1893–1897), director-general of Railways, chairman of the South Mahratta Railway Company and finally government director of Indian Railway Companies at the India Office (1897–1901).

On 20 November 1888 in Mumbai he married Henrietta Mary La Touche (1875–1945, Belgravia), daughter of Major General William Paget La Touche (1838–1904), Indian Army, and their issue included the Royal Navy Vice Admiral Arthur William La Touche Bisset. Rewarded with appointments as Companion (1888) and Knight Commander (1897) of the Order of the Indian Empire, William finally retired from the Army in 1898 and India Office in 1901 and died in Stoke Poges in 1916.
