= Walter Halsey =

British Army officer

Sir Walter Johnston Halsey
- Born: 1 June 1868; London
- Died: 2 September 1950 (aged 82); Hemel Hempstead, Herts
- Military career
- Allegiance: United Kingdom
- Branch: British Army
- Rank: Lieutenant-Colonel
- Unit: 4th Bn the Bedfordshire Regiment
- Conflicts: World War I
- Awards: OBE
- Other work: DL Herts and JP for Herts and Middlesex

Sir Walter Johnston Halsey, 2nd Baronet, OBE, DL, JP (1 June 1868 – 2 September 1950), sometime DL and JP for Hertfordshire and Middlesex, and chair. Legal Insurance Co. He succeeded to the title on the death of his father in 1927.

The son of Sir Frederick Halsey, the 1st Baronet, he was born in the parish of St George's, Hanover Square, London, England, and educated at Eton. Halsey was a member of the prominent Halsey family of Hertfordshire, whose seat was at Gaddesden Place, near Hemel Hempstead, his grandfather, Thomas Plumer Halsey, was Member of Parliament for Hertfordshire from 1847 to 24 April 1854.

Halsey married Agnes Marion, the daughter of William MacAlpine Leny, on 28 July 1896. He was appointed OBE in 1920, a JP, and was a Lieutenant-Colonel in the 4th Bn the Bedfordshire Regiment, serving in World War I as a staff captain DAAG and AAG. On 13 October 1917, he was appointed a deputy lieutenant of Hertfordshire.

He was the father of Captain Sir Thomas Halsey DSO (1898–1970), the 3rd Baronet.

Like most of the male members of his family, Halsey was a Freemason.

== See also ==
- Halsey Baronets

Baronetage of the United Kingdom
Preceded by Frederick Halsey	Baronet (of Gaddesdon, Hertfordshire); 1927–1950	Succeeded by Thomas Halsey
