= William Burnet Kinney =

American politician and diplomat

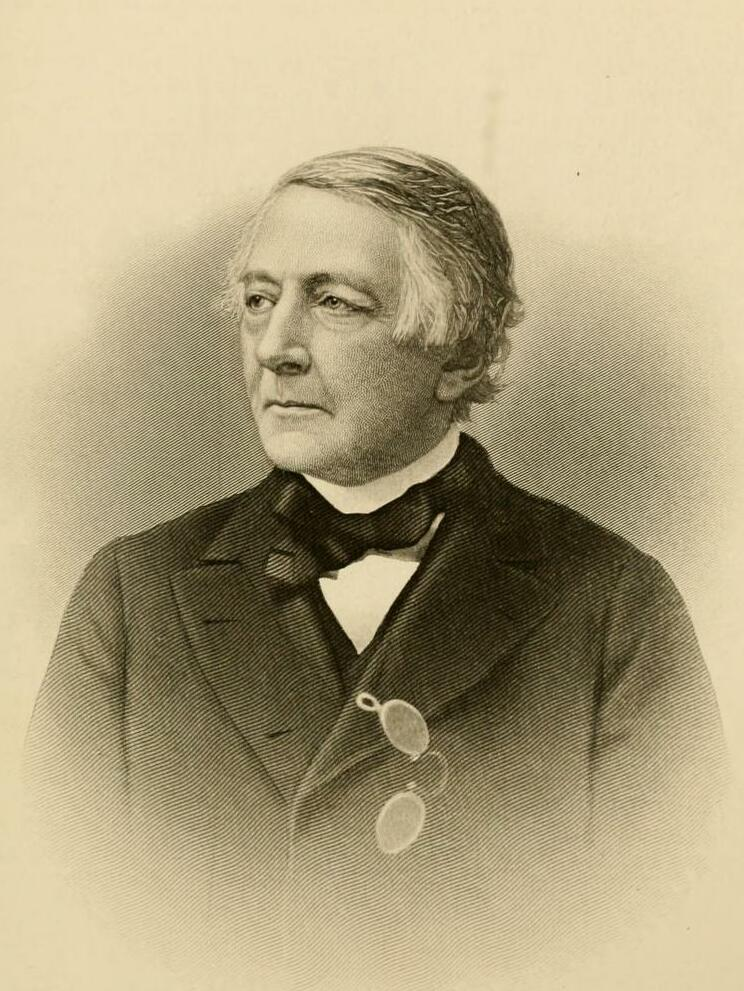

United States Minister to Sardinia
- In office 1850–1856
- President: Zachary Taylor; Millard Fillmore; Franklin Pierce

Personal details
- Born: September 4, 1799 Morristown, New Jersey
- Died: October 21, 1880 (aged 81) New York City
- Spouses: Mary Chandler (m. 1820; died 1841) Elizabeth Clementine Stedman (m. 1841)
- Children: 4
- Profession: Newspaperman, politician, and diplomat

William Burnet Kinney (September 4, 1799 – October 21, 1880) was an American politician and diplomat.

== Early life and education ==
His grandfather, Sir Thomas Kinney, came to the United States from England before the Revolution to explore the mineral resources of New Jersey. Kinney was born to Abraham Kinney and Hannah Burnet on September 4, 1799, in the Speedwell section of Morristown, New Jersey. He was raised there and lived there in later life. He briefly attended the United States Military Academy. After graduating from Princeton University, he studied law under Joseph Coerten Hornblower.

== Career ==
In 1820, he started a career in journalism in Newark, New Jersey. Between 1820 and 1825, he was the editor of the New Jersey Eagle. He founded the Newark Daily Advertiser in 1832. He was an unsuccessful Whig candidate for the U.S. Congress in 1843. In 1850, he was appointed by President Zachary Taylor as the U. S. minister to Sardinia. Prior to this event, he had been conspicuous in various public capacities, and among them as a delegate, in 1844, to the Baltimore Whig convention, where he was largely instrumental in securing the nomination of his friend, Theodore Frelinghuysen, for the vice-presidency, with Henry Clay.

While minister at Turin he discussed with Count Cavour and other eminent men of the Kingdom of Sardinia the movement for the unification of Italy. He rendered also, at the same time, important services to Great Britain, for which he received an acknowledgment in a special despatch from Lord Palmerston. When the U. S. government offered to transport Lajos Kossuth to the United States in a national ship, detached from the Mediterranean Squadron. Kinney made himself acquainted with the aims and purposes of the Hungarian exile, and gave prompt instructions to the commander, and information to his own government, of the objects of the fugitive. Daniel Webster, who was at that time United States Secretary of State, thwarted Kossuth's philanthropic but impracticable efforts to enlist the United States in a foreign complication.

On the expiration of his term of office in 1856, Kinney moved from Turin to Florence, where he devoted much of his time to researching the Medici family with a view to producing a historical work, but he did not live to accomplish it.

== Personal life ==
Kinney married twice:

- On September 16, 1820, he married Mary Chandler. She died in 1841 at the age of 38. They had two children:
  - Thomas Talmadge Kinney
  - William Burnett Kinney, Jr.
- In 1841, he married Elizabeth Clementine Stedman, the author. They had two children:
  - Elizabeth Clementine Kinney who married William Ingraham Kip Jr. (1840-1902), the rector of Good Samaritan Missions in San Francisco and the son of Episcopal bishop and missionary to California, William Ingraham Kip. They had four children, three of whom survived to adulthood: Elizabeth Clementine Kip (married Guy L. Eddie of the U.S. Army); Lawrence Kip; and Mary Burnet Kip (married to Dr. Ernest Franklin Robertson of Kansas City, KS).
  - Mary Burnet Kinney.

He was a personal friend of Henry Clay. His great-great-grandsons are businesspeople Frederick R. Koch, Charles Koch, David Koch, and Bill Koch.

== Later life ==
Kinney lived in Florence until 1864 and returned to Morristown to live in retirement. He died on October 21, 1880, in New York City.
