= St. Matthew's United Church (Halifax, Nova Scotia) =

Church building in Nova Scotia, Canada

Coordinates: 44°38′37.94″N 63°34′19.01″W

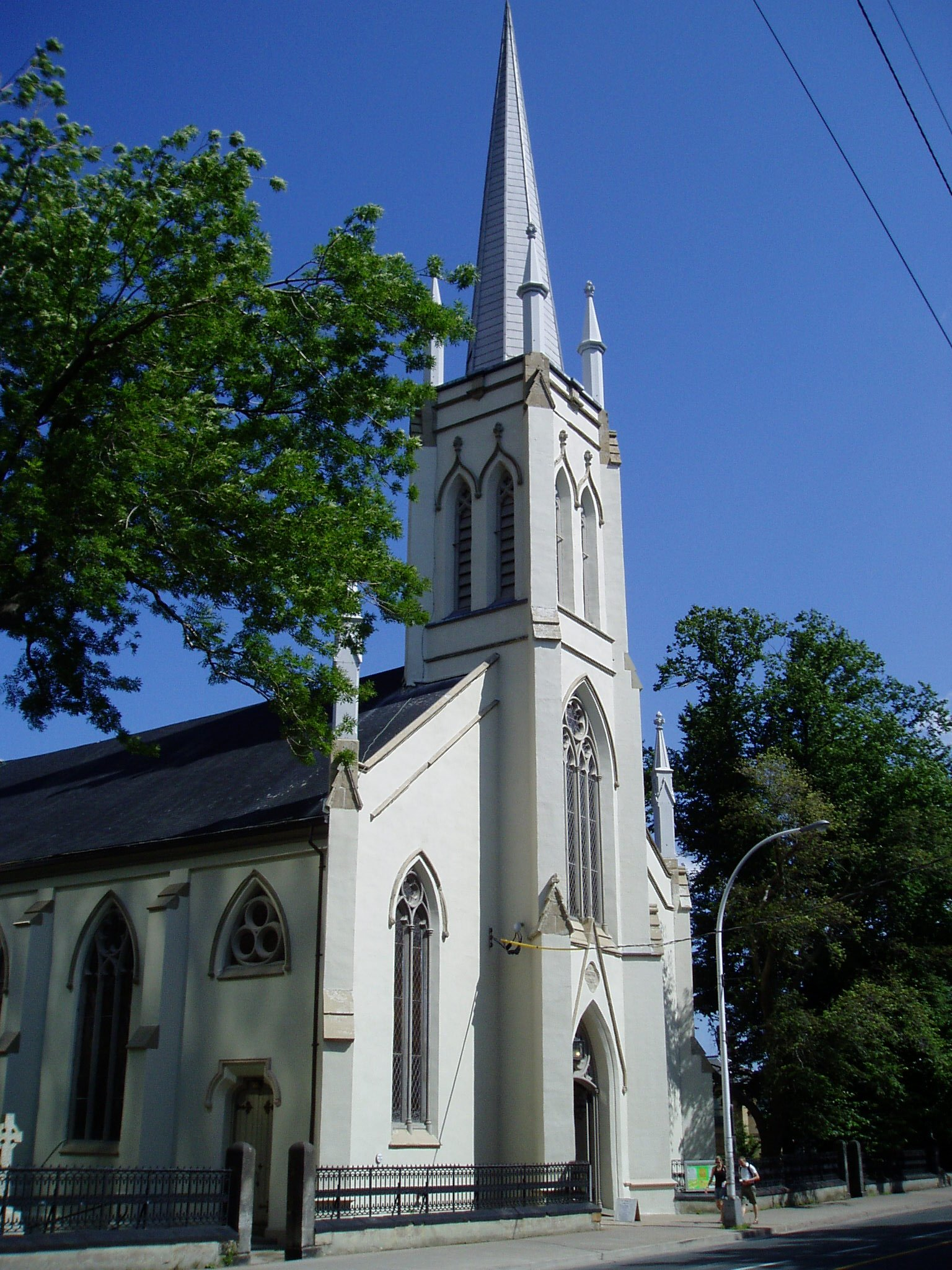
St. Matthew's United Church

St. Matthew's United Church is a United Church of Canada church in downtown Halifax, Nova Scotia. The church was founded at the same time as the original colony in 1749 as a home for the various groups of dissenting Protestants who were from New England and who did not follow the Church of England. It originally met Sunday afternoons in St. Paul's Church, the Church of England building completed in 1750. The church got its own home in 1754 when a church was constructed at Hollis and Prince streets. This building was destroyed by fire in 1857, and a new church was built at the current location at 1479 Barrington Street, land parcelled off of the Black-Binney House estate by Bishop Hibbert Binney. The church used the Old Burying Ground (Halifax, Nova Scotia).

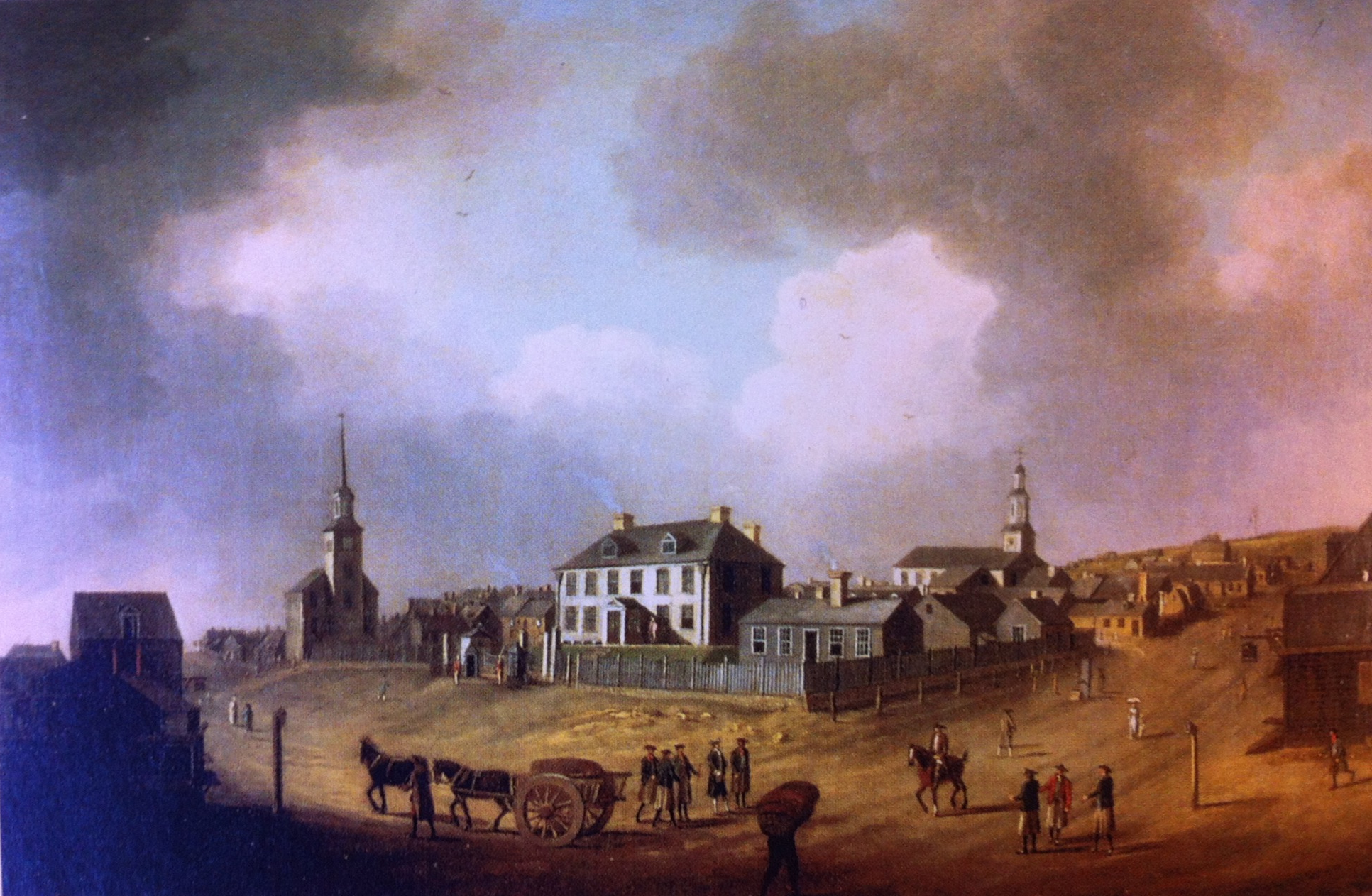
St. Matthew's (left), 1762

The church was originally an amalgam of various dissenting Protestant groups with it mostly being a mix of Scottish Presbyterians and Puritan Congregationalists from the American colonies. Over the course of the 19th century the number of Presbyterians gradually increased and they came to dominate the church. In 1787, an agreement was made to adhere closer to Church of Scotland polity. They formally joined the Church of Scotland in the 1830s and joined Presbyterian Church in Canada in 1875. In 1925, however, it returned somewhat to its roots when the United Church of Canada was formed uniting several of the major Protestant denominations including the Presbyterians and Congregationalists.

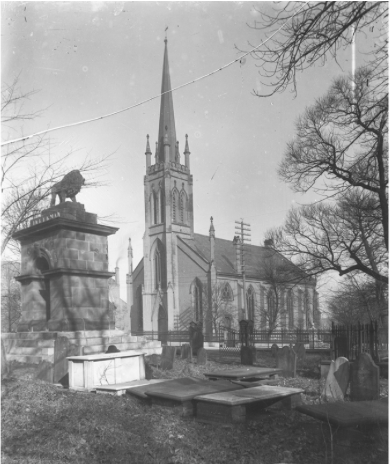
Saint Matthew's Church, Barrington Street, Halifax, c. 1900

George Monro Grant, grandfather of George Parkin Grant and great-grandfather of Michael Ignatieff, was Minister from 1863 - 1877. Grant was appointed to Kingston, Ontario as Principal of Queen's University, by the Presbyterian Church in Canada's General Assembly, meeting within the congregation in June 1877. Sandford Fleming was also an Elder in congregation during Grant's tenure. The 250th Anniversary celebrated in 1999, with a new history book, A sentinel on the street; St Matthew's United Church, Halifax 1749-1999 by Elizabeth Townsend, et al.

On July 1, 2026 the congregation of St. Matthew's United Church formally amalgamated with St. Andrew's United Church and Fort Massey United Church to form 'Halifax United Church'.

== Ministers (1751–1883) ==
- Rev Aaron Cleveland (1751–1753) (died in the home of his friend Benjamin Franklin)
- John Seccombe (1761–1783)
- Thomas Russell (1784–1787)
- Rev Andrew Brown Old College, the University of Edinburgh (1787–1795)
- Rev Archibald Gray (1795–1826); buried in the Old Burying Ground (Halifax, Nova Scotia)
- Rev. John Scott (minister) (1826–1883)
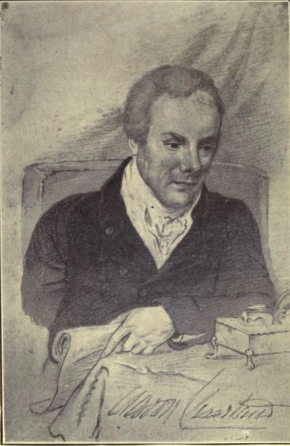
Rev Aaron Cleveland (1751–1753)

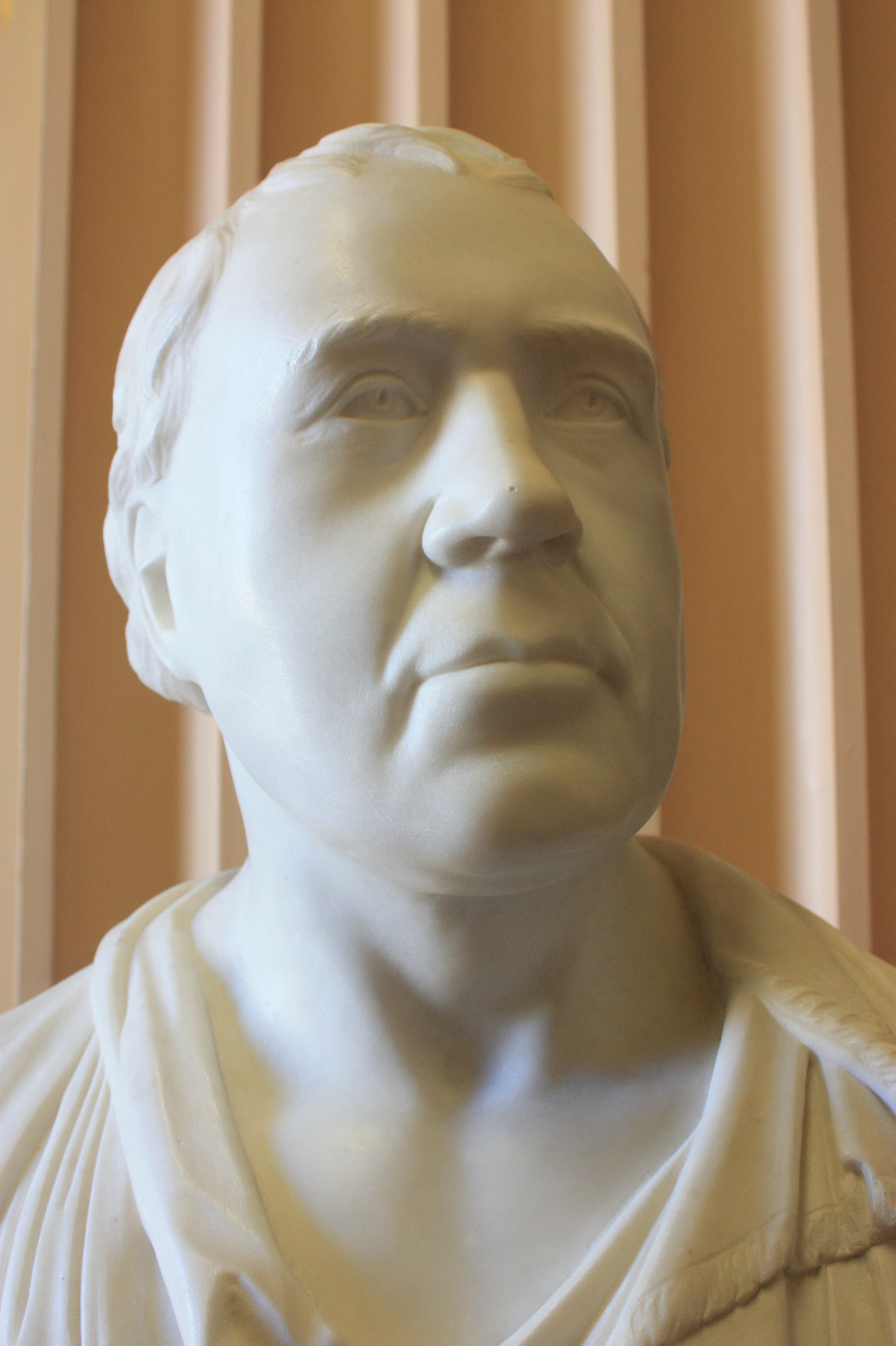
Rev Andrew Brown Old College, the University of Edinburgh (1787–1795)

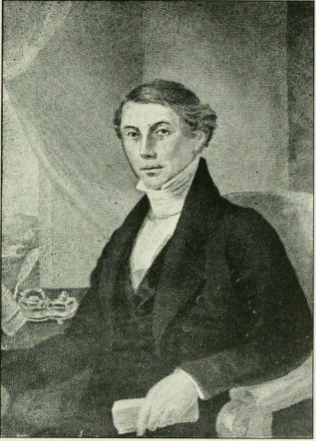
Rev Archibald Gray (1795–1826); buried in the Old Burying Ground (Halifax, Nova Scotia)

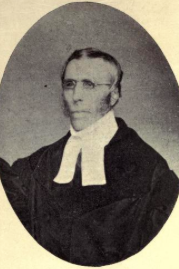
Rev. John Scott (minister)

The Rev. Elizabeth (Betsy) Hogan (2010-2025) (Associate, 2001-2010) The Rev. Judith Perry (Supply, 2025-2026)

== Notable members ==
- Joshua Mauger
