= Colin Smith (minister) =

Previous minister of the Church of Scotland

Colin Smith (1802–1867) was a minister of the Church of Scotland and amateur botanist, who served as Moderator of the General Assembly in 1861. He was involved in translating the Bible into Gaelic.

== Life ==
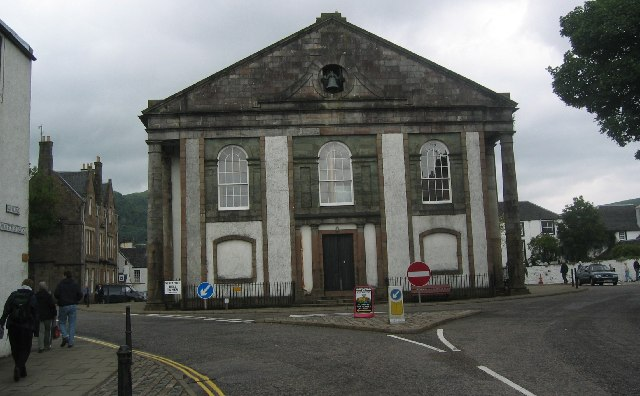
Glenaray and Inveraray Parish Church

He was born at Glenorchy in the Scottish Highlands in1802 the son of Patrick Smith a merchant and studied at Glasgow University.

His first role in the clergy was as assistant to Paul Fraser at Inverary Parish Church and then assisting Angus McLain at the same church. In April 1828 he was ordained as minister of the parish under the patronage of George William, Duke of Argyll in place of NcLain who translated to another parish. In August 1831 he translated to the neighbouring parish of Glenaray his place at Inverary being filled by Duncan Campbell. Smith remained minister of Glenaray for the rest of his life.

In 1840 he formed part of the small Committee translating the Bible into Gaelic to address the issues of the outer islands where Gaelic remained either the dominant or sole language. In December 1849 Glasgow University awarded him an honorary Doctor of Divinity.

In 1861 he succeeded James Maitland as Moderator of the General Assembly of the Church of Scotland the highest position in the Scottish Church. He was succeeded in turn by James Bisset.

He died on 13 July 1867.

== Family ==
Around 1833 he married Ann Barbara Campbell (d.1886), daughter of Dugald Campbell of Achleen. Their twelve children included:

- Alice (b.1835) married Rev Stewart Wright of Blantyre
- Isabella (1836-1902)
- John Patrick Smith (1838-1905) died in Australia
- Barbara (1840-1859)
- Margaret Ann (b.1842) married Rev James Macfadyen of Kildalton
- Annie (b.1843) married Clement Simpson a marchant in Madras
- Jeannie (b.1845) married Rev Donald Carmichael minister of Inverary
- Wilhelmina Mary (1847-1873)
- Colina Lily (1849-1901) married William Walker Munsie a merchant in London and Madras
- Patrick Dugald Smith (b.1851)
- Elizabeth Dora (1853-1871)
- Duncan (1856-1858)

== Publications ==
- Account of the Parishes of Glenaray and Glassary (1845)
