= Andrew Brown (minister) =

Scottish professor of rhetoric, historian, and author (1763–1834)

The Very Reverend Andrew Brown
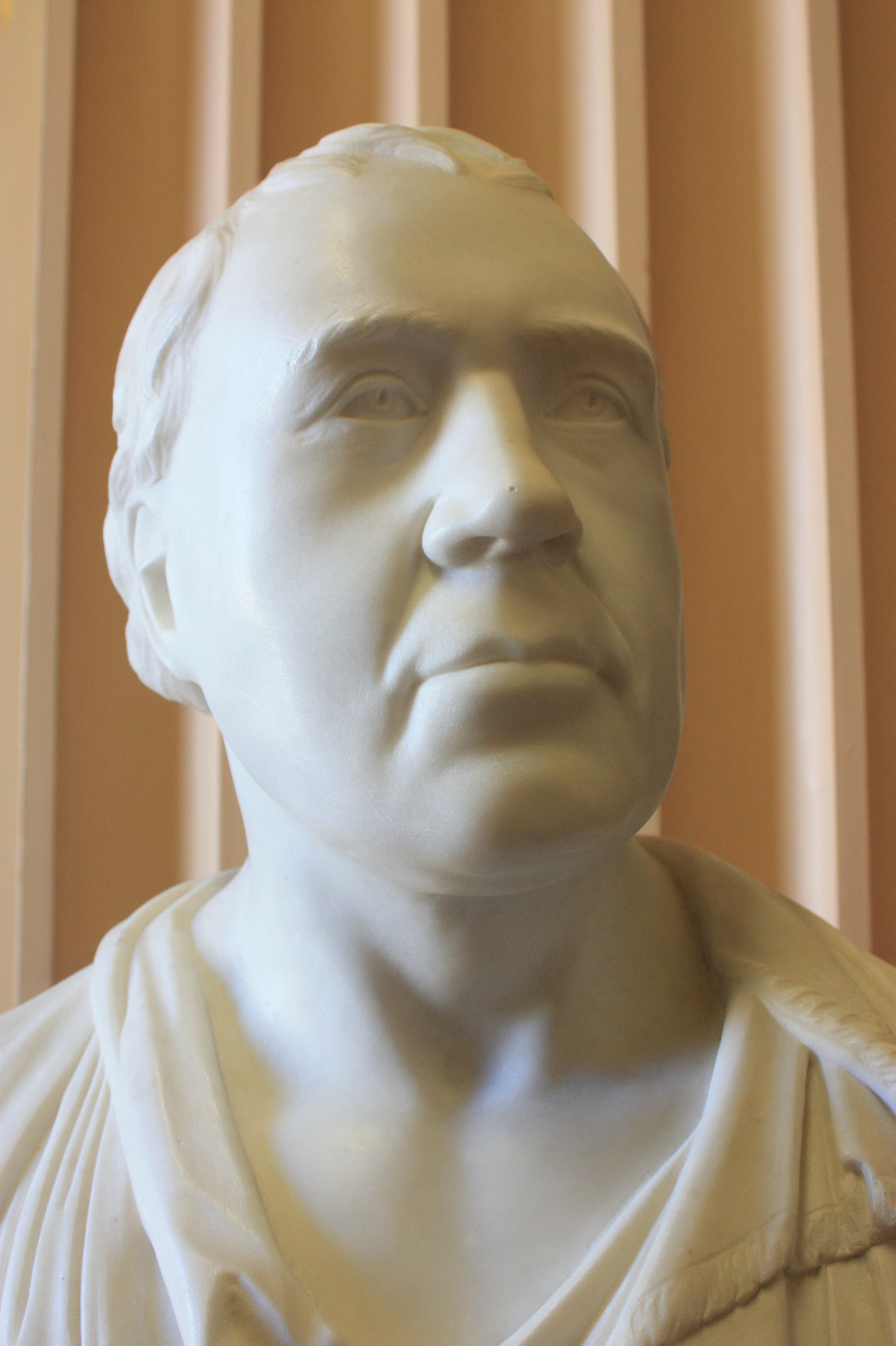
- Bust of Rev Andrew Brown by Thomas Campbell (1815), Old College, Edinburgh University
- Born: 22 August 1763; Biggar, South Lanarkshire, Scotland
- Died: 19 February 1834 (aged 70); Carrington, Midlothian, Scotland
- Occupations: Professor; Minister; Author
- Years active: 1786–1834

Andrew Brown FRSE (22 August 1763 – 19 February 1834) was Professor of Rhetoric at the University of Edinburgh and Moderator of the General Assembly of the Church of Scotland in 1813. He was also a historian and author, closely connected to the history of Nova Scotia having served as a minister at St. Matthew's United Church in Halifax.

== Life ==
=== Early years ===
Brown was born on 22 August 1763 in Biggar, South Lanarkshire, the son of Isabella Forrest and Richard Brown, a weaver. He studied theology at the University of Glasgow and became a licensed minister of the Church of Scotland in 1786, being licensed by the Presbytery of Biggar but not receiving a post there.

=== In North America ===
In 1787, Brown travelled to Halifax, Nova Scotia to serve as a minister at St. Matthew's Church. He also served as chaplin to the North British Society and British naval and army forces in the area.

In 1788, during his time in Halifax, he received an honorary doctorate (Doctor of Divinity), from the University of Edinburgh.

He remained in North America until 1795. During this period he gathered historical information for a future publication on the history of North America. For the rest of his life this research continued but he failed to publish the materials. He attempted to compose the disputes between various factions in the parish and the region. He was particularly interested in the history of the Acadians both before and during their expulsion from Canada, and wrote sympathetically of them. He was strongly critical of Acting Governor Charles Lawrence for his role in the Expulsion of the Acadians. Brown came to the conclusion that the Expulsion was largely the work of a Council dominated by Boston interests, a conclusion which anticipated the later position of John Bartlet Brebner's New England's Outpost. Brebner may have been influenced by Brown's work.

In 1791 Brown visited Philadelphia and met Benjamin Rush, who described Brown as "a man of genius learning and observation". Brown's research appears to have included extended correspondence with the American historian Jeremy Belknap, whom he met during this same visit.

=== Return to Scotland ===
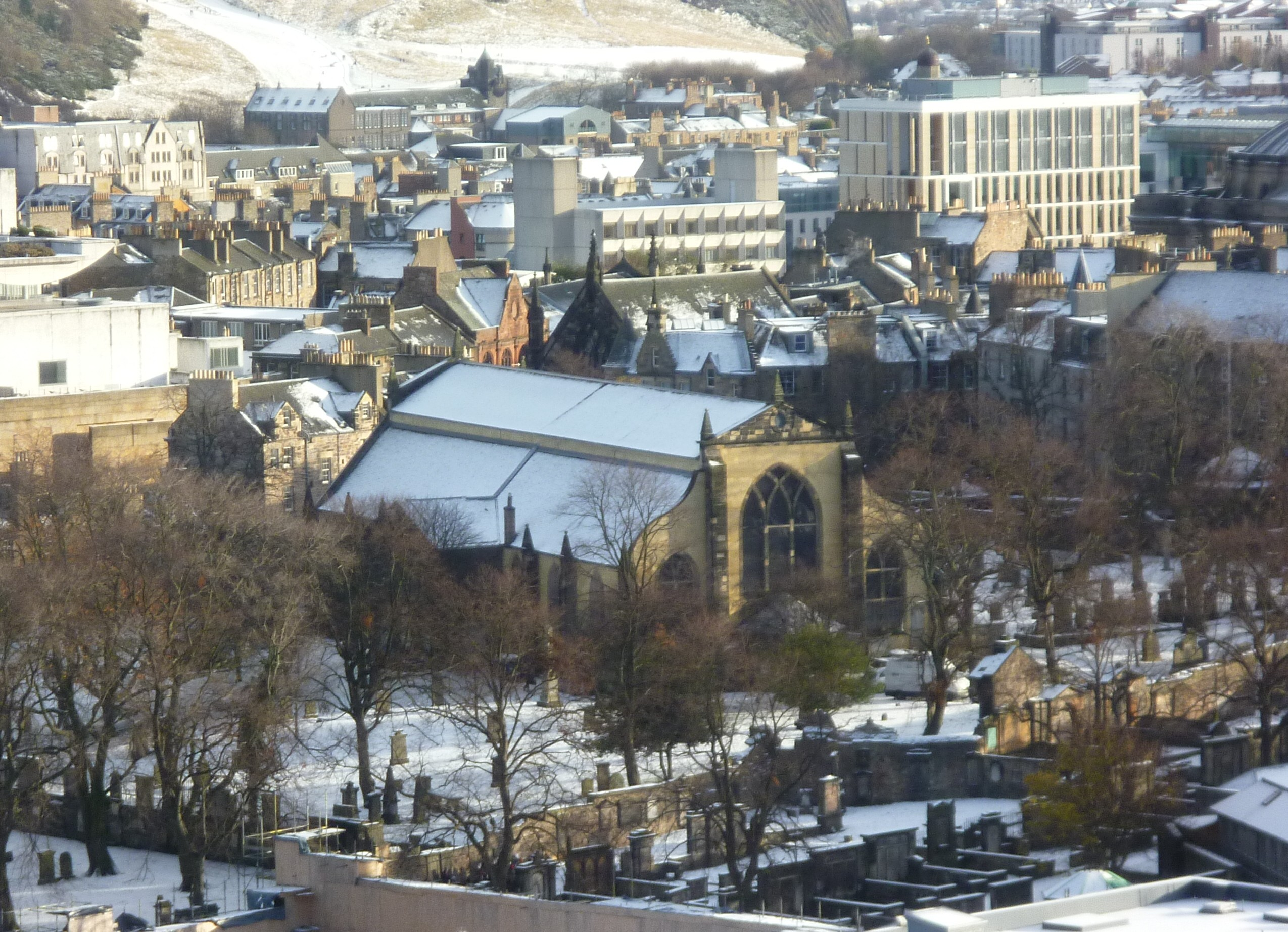
Greyfriars Kirk in Edinburgh

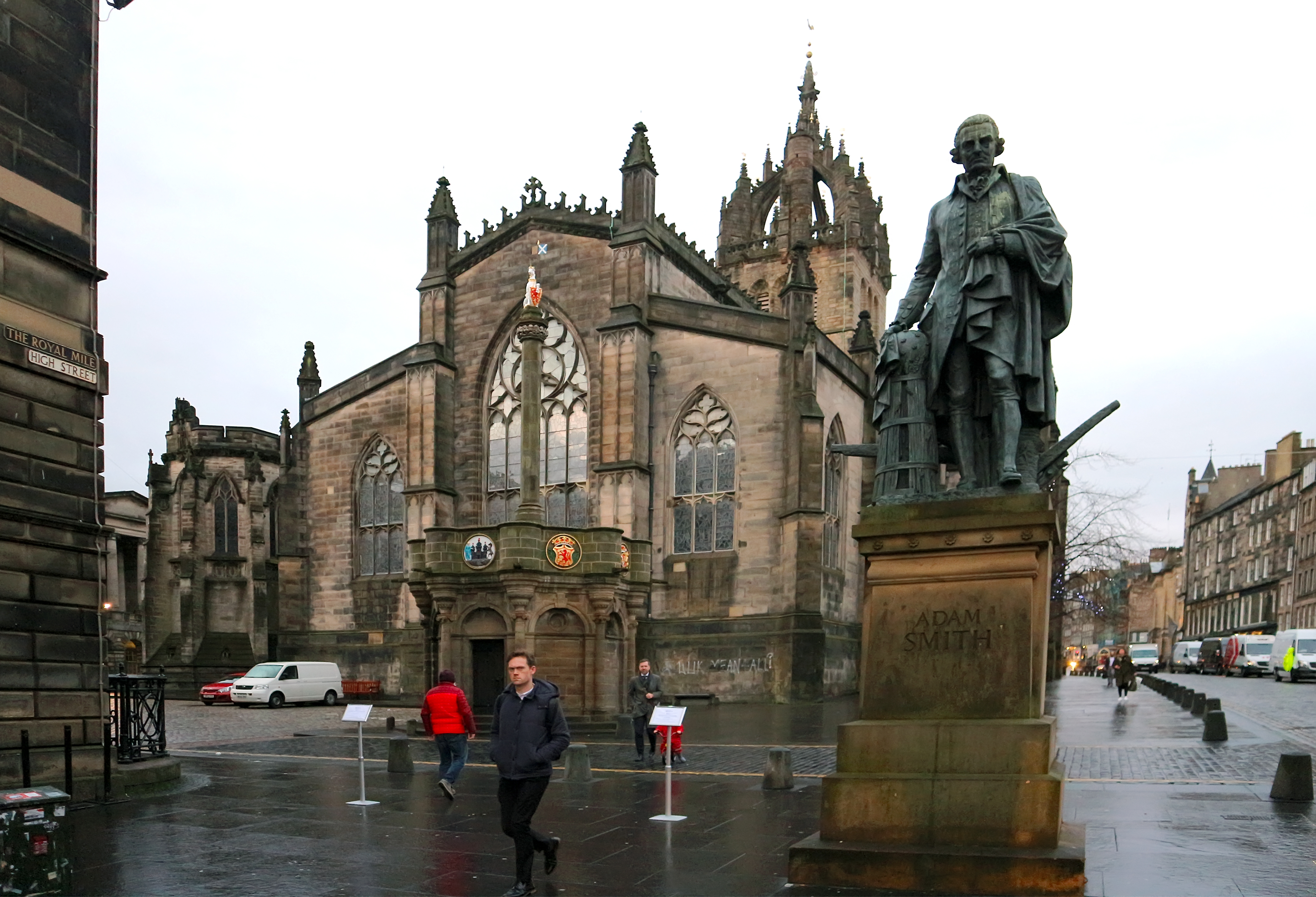
St. Giles Cathedral, Edingburgh

In 1792 Brown briefly returned to Scotland to marry his first wife before returning with her to Nova Scotia. He returned to Scotland permanently in 1795, finding employment as a minister of Lochmaben Church in Dumfriesshire. In 1799 he received a prestigious position at New Greyfriars in Edinburgh but in July 1800 translated to the Old Kirk of St Giles. (the church at that time being physically split in two to serve two parishes).

In the same year (1801) he replaced the recently deceased Professor Hugh Blair as Professor of Rhetoric and Belle Lettres at the University of Edinburgh and served this role until his own death. He was aided in securing this position by a recommendation from Prince William Henry. Brown had travelled with the Prince on his return to Scotland in 1795.

Brown was elected a Fellow of the Royal Society of Edinburgh in 1803. He was elected Moderator of the General Assembly of the Church of Scotland in 1813 by his fellow ministers. At this time he lived at 13 Argyll Square south of St Giles.

Brown continued his research after his return to Scotland (covering the period 1790 to 1815) but it was not published during his lifetime. He wrote several drafts of what he intended to be a comprehensive History of North America, but it was never completed and published.

From 1822 to 1825 he was assisted at Old Kirk, St Giles by James Maitland (who served as Moderator in 1860).

In 1833 he is listed as living at Primrose Bank in Edinburgh. This had been the home of his third wife's first husband.

He died in Carrington, Midlothian near Edinburgh on 19 February 1834, and is buried in Greyfriars Kirkyard in Edinburgh city centre. His position at Old Kirk, St Giles was filled by Rev John Lee.

== Family ==
On 10 September 1792 he married Daniel (sic) Cranstoun, daughter of George Cranstoun of Harvieston, at Harvieston near Dollar, Clackmannanshire. The couple had two children: George Cranstoun Brown WS (b.1794) and Daniel Isabella Elizabeth Brown (1795-1809).

Following his first wife's death he married Mary Grant, daughter of Dr Gregory Grant, in March 1805, the marriage taking place in Edinburgh. Mary died in 1826.

His final marriage was to Mary Ogilvie (d.1852), widow of Dr Andrew Pearson of Primrose Bank. Their wedding took place on 10 March 1830 in Edinburgh.

== Publications ==
- A Sermon on the Dangers and Duties of Seafaring Life (1793)
- Love of Country Explained and Illustrated (1801)
- The Standard of Excellence Established in the Gospel (1810)
- Notice of the Life and Character of Prof Alexander Christison (1820)
- The Belknap Papers
- Removal of the French Inhabitants of Nova Scotia in 1755
- Notes on the Acadian French
