= James Bissett (disambiguation) =

James Bissett is a Canadian former diplomat.

James Bissett may also refer to:

- Jimmy Bissett (1898–after 1932), Scottish footballer
- James Bissett (Royal Navy officer), in Battle of Jean-Rabel

== See also ==
- James Bissett Pratt (1875–1944), American philosopher
