= Frederick Halsey =

British politician

The Right Honourable Sir Frederick Halsey Bt DL
- Frederick Halsey, 1906

Member of Parliament for Hertfordshire
- In office 1874–1885
- Prime Minister: Benjamin Disraeli; William Ewart Gladstone
- Preceded by: Henry Brand
- Succeeded by: Constituency Abolished

Member of Parliament for Watford
- In office 1885–1906
- Prime Minister: Marquess of Salisbury; William Ewart Gladstone; Marquess of Salisbury; William Ewart Gladstone; Earl of Roseberry; Marquess of Salisbury; Arthur Balfour; Henry Campbell-Bannerman
- Preceded by: new constituency
- Succeeded by: Nathaniel Micklem

Personal details
- Born: 9 December 1839
- Died: 12 February 1927 (aged 87)
- Party: Conservative

Sir Thomas Frederick Halsey, 1st Baronet, PC, DL (9 December 1839 – 12 February 1927) was an English Conservative Party politician who sat in the House of Commons from 1874 to 1906.

== Background and education ==
Halsey came from one of the most prominent families of Hertfordshire, whose seat was at Gaddesden Place, near Hemel Hempstead. He was the son of Thomas Plumer Halsey and his wife Frederica Johnston, daughter of General F. Johnston. His father was Member of Parliament (MP) for Hertfordshire from 1847 until he was drowned with his wife and his younger son in the shipwreck of the steamer Ercolano in the Gulf of Genoa on 24 April 1854. Frederick Halsey was at Eton at the time. He progressed from there to Christ Church, Oxford. He rowed in the losing Oxford eight in the Boat Race in 1860.

After graduating in 1861, Halsey took up the life of a county notable in Hertfordshire, obtaining a commission in the North Hertfordshire Yeomanry and becoming a Justice of the Peace. He was chairman of the Gaddesden School Board.

== Political career ==
At the 1874 general election, Halsey was elected Conservative MP for Hertfordshire and served in the post until 1885, when the constituencies were reorganised under the Redistribution of Seats Act 1885. At the 1885 general election, he was elected for Watford. He was also an alderman of Hertfordshire County Council from 1888, and was particularly interested in the Hertfordshire Constabulary. He served as deputy chairman of the St Albans Quarter Sessions from 1889 to 1908. In 1899 he was elected chairman of the House of Commons Standing Orders Committee and the Committee of Selection, and for service in this role was appointed to the Privy Council after the accession of King Edward VII on 24 January 1901, entitling him to the style "The Right Honourable". Halsey held his seat until 1906, when he lost to the Liberal candidate Nathaniel Micklem.

After his parliamentary defeat, he once again devoted himself to county affairs, serving as chairman of the St Albans Quarter Sessions from 1908 to 1918. No decision of his court was ever appealed. He finally retired from the Hertfordshire Yeomanry with the rank of lieutenant-colonel, having served as second-in-command, and then joined the county Territorial Force association, becoming its chairman.

Announced in the 1920 Birthday Honours., he was created a baronet on 22 June 1920,

== Private life ==
He was an active Freemason, and served as Deputy Grand Master of the United Grand Lodge of England (UGLE) and Second Grand Principal of the Supreme Grand Chapter of the Royal Arch from 1903. From 1886, he was the Provincial Grand Master for Hertfordshire in the Grand Lodge of Mark Master Masons of England and Wales, an office he held for almost 40 years. He also served as Provincial Grand Master of Craft Freemasonry (UGLE) in Hertfordshire from 1873 and Superintendent of Royal Arch Freemasonry in Hertfordshire from 1875. As the presiding officer at Supreme Grand Chapter of England on the day after war was declared in 1914, Halsey made the first statement by a Masonic Ruler concerning the outbreak of war, in which he commended those Freemasons who were taking up the call to arms.

In December 1908, he was appointed a deputy lieutenant of Hertfordshire.

Halsey lived at Gaddesden Place, Hemel Hempstead. He died at the age of 87.

== Family ==
Halsey married in 1865 Mary Julia Wells, and had ten children, including:

- Sir Walter Johnston Halsey, 2nd Baronet (1868–1950)
- Captain Arthur Halsey (1869–1957)
- Rev. Frederick Halsey (1870–1952)
- Admiral Sir Lionel Halsey (1872–1949), fourth son.
- Edith Halsey (d.1952), youngest daughter, who married in 1903 Lieutenant-Colonel Bernard Granville (1873–1933), 3rd The King's Own Hussars. They had children.

== See also ==
- List of Oxford University Boat Race crews

== Footnotes ==
Parliament of the United Kingdom
Preceded by Henry Brand; Henry Cowper; Abel Smith, jnr	Member of Parliament for Hertfordshire; 1874–1885; With: Henry Cowper 1865–1885; Abel Smith, jnr 1866–1885	Constituency abolished
New constituency	Member of Parliament for Watford; 1885–1906	Succeeded by Nathaniel Micklem
Baronetage of the United Kingdom
New creation	Baronet (of Gaddesdon, Hertfordshire); 1920–1927	Succeeded by Walter Johnston Halsey
