= David Low Dodge =

American theologian and antiwar activist (1774–1852)

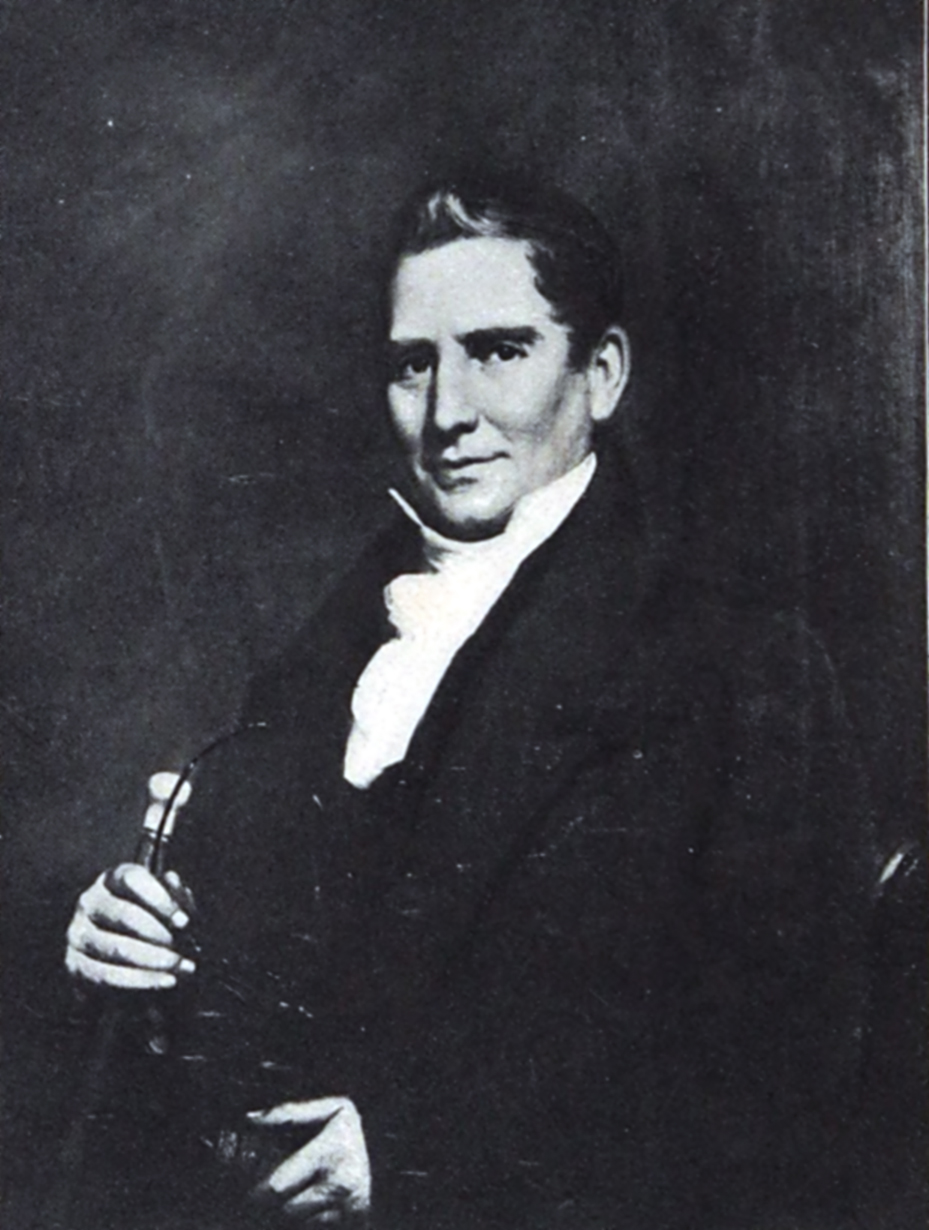
- David Low Dodge, circa 1830.
- Born: June 14, 1774; Brooklyn, Connecticut
- Died: April 23, 1852 (aged 77); New York City
- Occupations: Activist, theologian
- Era: Early 19th century
- Spouse: Sarah Cleveland (m. 1798)
- Children: 7, including William E. Dodge and Elizabeth Clementine Stedman

David Low Dodge (June 14, 1774 – April 23, 1852) was an American activist and theologian who helped to establish the New York Peace Society and was a founder of the New York Bible Society and the New York Tract Society. According to historian Dale R. Steiner, he wrote "some of the earliest and most effective antiwar literature in the United States."

== Life and career ==
David Low Dodge was born in Brooklyn, Connecticut, on June 14, 1774. His parents were David Dodge and Mary (Stuart) Earl. She was said to have been the daughter of a Scottish nobleman, perhaps connected with the House of Stuart, pretenders to the British throne, although this has never been confirmed. She had previously been married to William Earl who died of yellow fever fighting for the British during an attack on Havana in 1762. During the War of Independence, Mary's two children from this first marriage, William and Jesse Earl, were both killed on active service. Dodge later wrote that "these events almost destroyed my mother's nervous system."

From the age of seven to fourteen, except two months of district school in winter, Dodge was working on a farm in Hampton, Connecticut. He was a teacher at the age of nineteen, first in community schools then in private ones. He later began selling dry goods in Hartford, Connecticut. He also managed the first cotton factory built in Connecticut, near the town of Norwich. In the early 19th century he relocated to New York City.

On June 7, 1798, he married Sarah Cleveland (1780–1862), the daughter of Rev. Aaron Cleveland (1744–1815) and Abiah Hyde (c1750–1788). (Note: Aaron Cleveland was the son of Aaron Cleveland who was also a clergyman. In David Low Dodge's autobiography, Memorial of Mr. David L. Dodge, consisting of an autobiography, prepared at the request and for the use of his children; with a few selections from his writings, published 1854, pages 53-54, he writes that Sarah's father was a hatter from Hadden Connecticut, born 1744. He entered the ministry late in life holding office in Orange County, Vermont.) They had seven children including William E. Dodge and Elizabeth Clementine Stedman. He was also the great-grandfather of Grace Hoadley Dodge. Sarah Cleveland was great-aunt of Grover Cleveland 22nd and 24th President of the United States.

He died on April 23, 1852, in New York City.

== Peace activism ==
David Low Dodge is credited with publishing the first pamphlets in America that expressed the futility of war. The Mediator's Kingdom not of this World, was published in 1809; his second, War Inconsistent with the Religion of Jesus Christ, was completed in 1812, two years before the publication of Noah Worcester's Solemn Review of the Custom of War—a work that has since overshadowed Dodge's contribution.

Dodge considered forming the first peace society in 1812, but the timing was inappropriate due to the war with Great Britain. However, in August 1815 the New York Peace Society was formed with Dodge as the president. This was the first in the world—four months before Noah Worcester formed the Massachusetts Peace Society (December 26, 1815), and a year before the English Peace society was formed (June 14, 1816). In 1829 he assisted in organizing the new national society, and presided at its first annual meeting. He was a member of the board of directors, and later a life director, maintaining his connection with the society until his death.

== Founded organizations ==
- New York Peace Society (August 1815)
- New York Tract Society
- New York Bible Society

== Notable publications ==
- Dodge, David Low (1809). The Mediator's Kingdom not of this World; But Spiritual, Heavenly, and Divine. New York: William & Whiting.
- Dodge, David Low (1905). War Inconsistent with the Religion of Jesus Christ. Boston: Ginn & Company. Originally published in 1812.
