= Halsey House =

Halsey House may refer to:

- Nicoll Halsey House and Halseyville Archeological Sites, Halseyville, New York, NRHP-listed
- Halsey House (Southampton, New York)
- Halsey Estate-Tallwood, West Hills, New York, NRHP-listed
- Halsey Stevens House, Newburgh, New York
- Halsey Grocery Warehouse, Huntsville, Alabama
- W. L. Halsey Warehouse, Huntsville, Alabama
