= Halsey Street =

Halsey Street may refer to the following:

- Halsey Street, in Downtown Newark, NJ
- Halsey Street (BMT Canarsie Line), serving the L train in Brooklyn, NY
- Halsey Street (BMT Jamaica Line), serving the J train in Brooklyn, NY
- Halsey Street, a novel by Naima Coster
