= Archibald Gray (minister) =

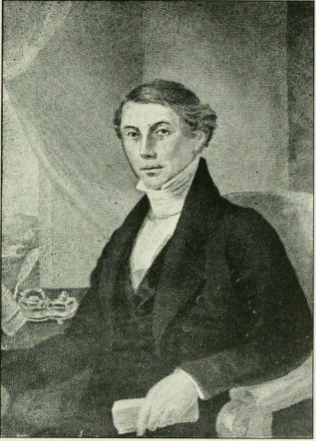
Rev Archibald Gray by Robert Field

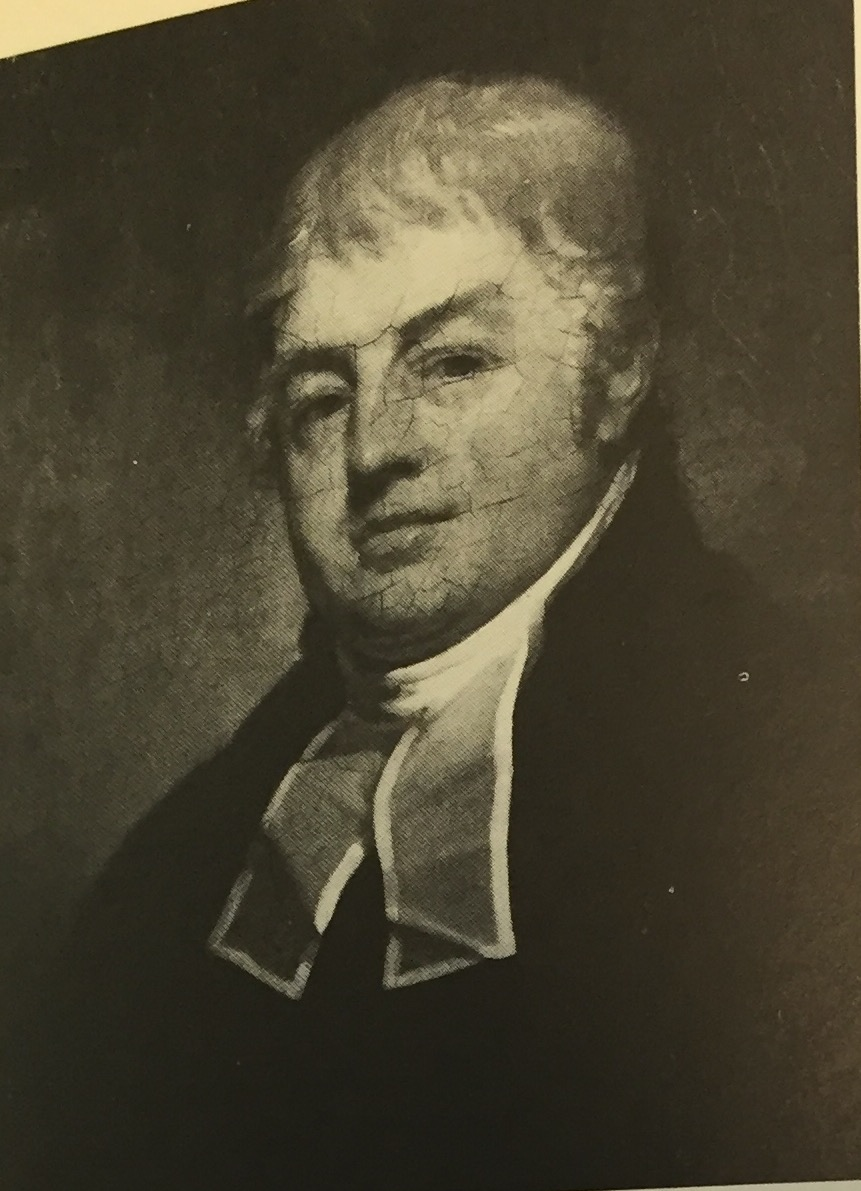
Gravestone of Rev. Archibald Gray (d. 1826) minister of St Matthew's Church for 35 years

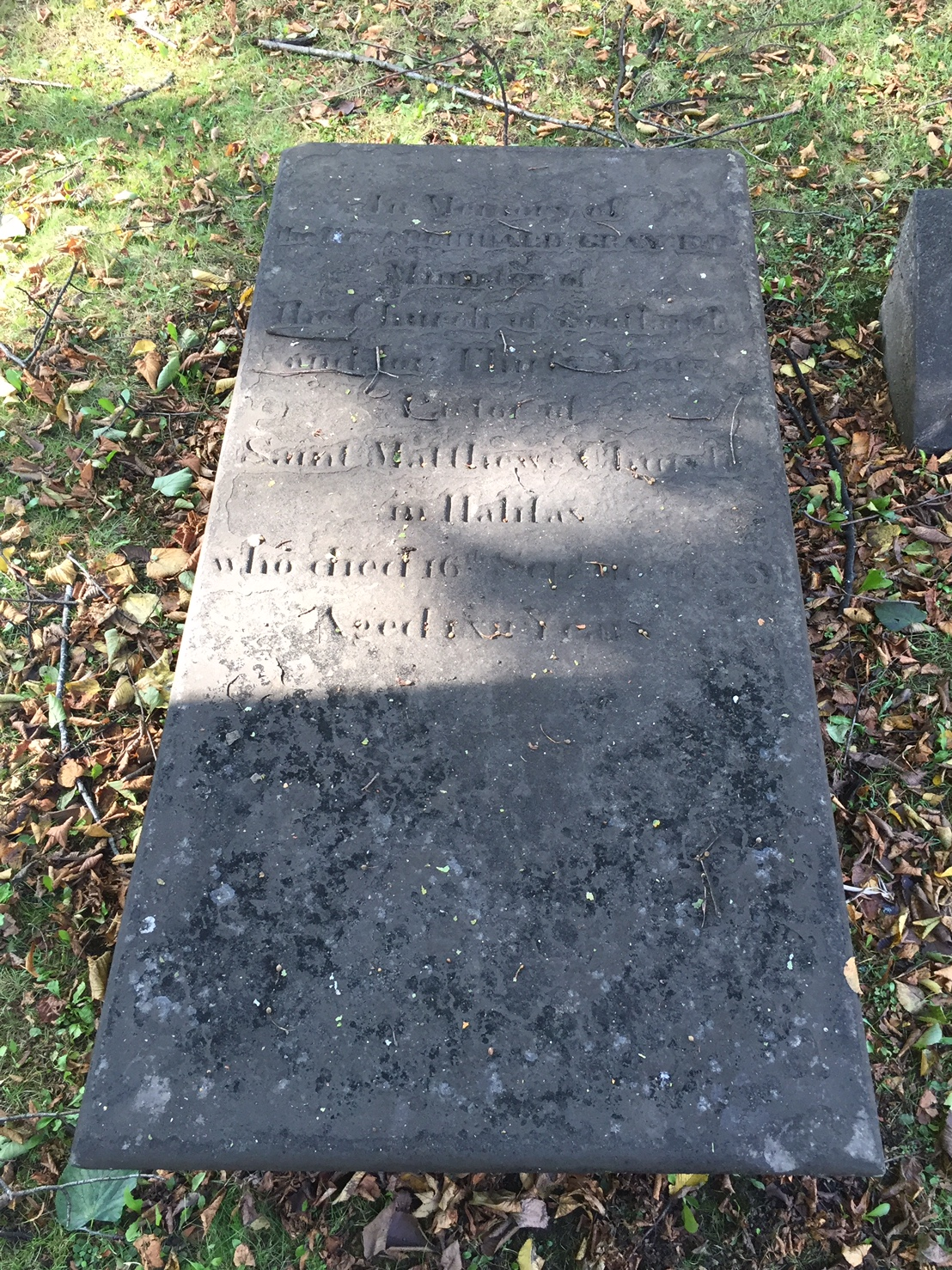
Rev Archibald Gray, Old Burying Ground, Halifax, Nova Scotia

Reverend Archibald Gray (died 1831) was an influential Presbyterian minister in Halifax, Nova Scotia. He served in the St. Matthew's United Church (Halifax) for 30 years (1795–1826). Gray was a native of Morayshire and a graduate of King's College, Aberdeen. While he baptized his son at St Matthew's, his mother belonged to the Church of England, and after Gray's death his son entered the Anglican ministry. He was a strong advocate for public education.

Gray is buried in the Old Burying Ground. He was a member of the North British Society.
