= Nicholas Halsey =

British Army officer

Nicholas Guy Halsey TD, DL, FRICS (born 14 June 1948) is the heir to the Halsey Baronetcy.

Halsey is the son of Lieutenant Colonel Guy Marsden Halsey, TD (1908–1990), the second son of the Reverend Frederick Halsey and Audrey Katherine, née Marsden.

A member of the prominent Halsey family of Hertfordshire, Halsey was educated at Eton and the Royal Agricultural College at Cirencester. He served as a Major in the Royal Green Jackets, and is a Fellow of the Royal Institution of Chartered Surveyors. He was High Sheriff of Hertfordshire in 1995. He married Viola Georgina Juliet Thorne on 7 August 1976. Their son is Guy Francis Johnston Halsey, born in 1981.

Halsey is the Lord of the manor for Hemel Hempstead and owner of the Gaddesden Estate, and as such is patron of the Church of St John the Baptist, Great Gaddesden.

Halsey also served as president of the Royal Forestry Society 2011–2015.

Honorary titles
Preceded by Lady Staughton	High Sheriff of Hertfordshire; 1995	Succeeded by Robert Edward Dimsdale
