= James Maitland (minister) =

Church of Scotland minister (1797–1872)

James Maitland (1797–1872) was a minister of the Church of Scotland, who served as Moderator of the General Assembly in 1860.

== Life ==
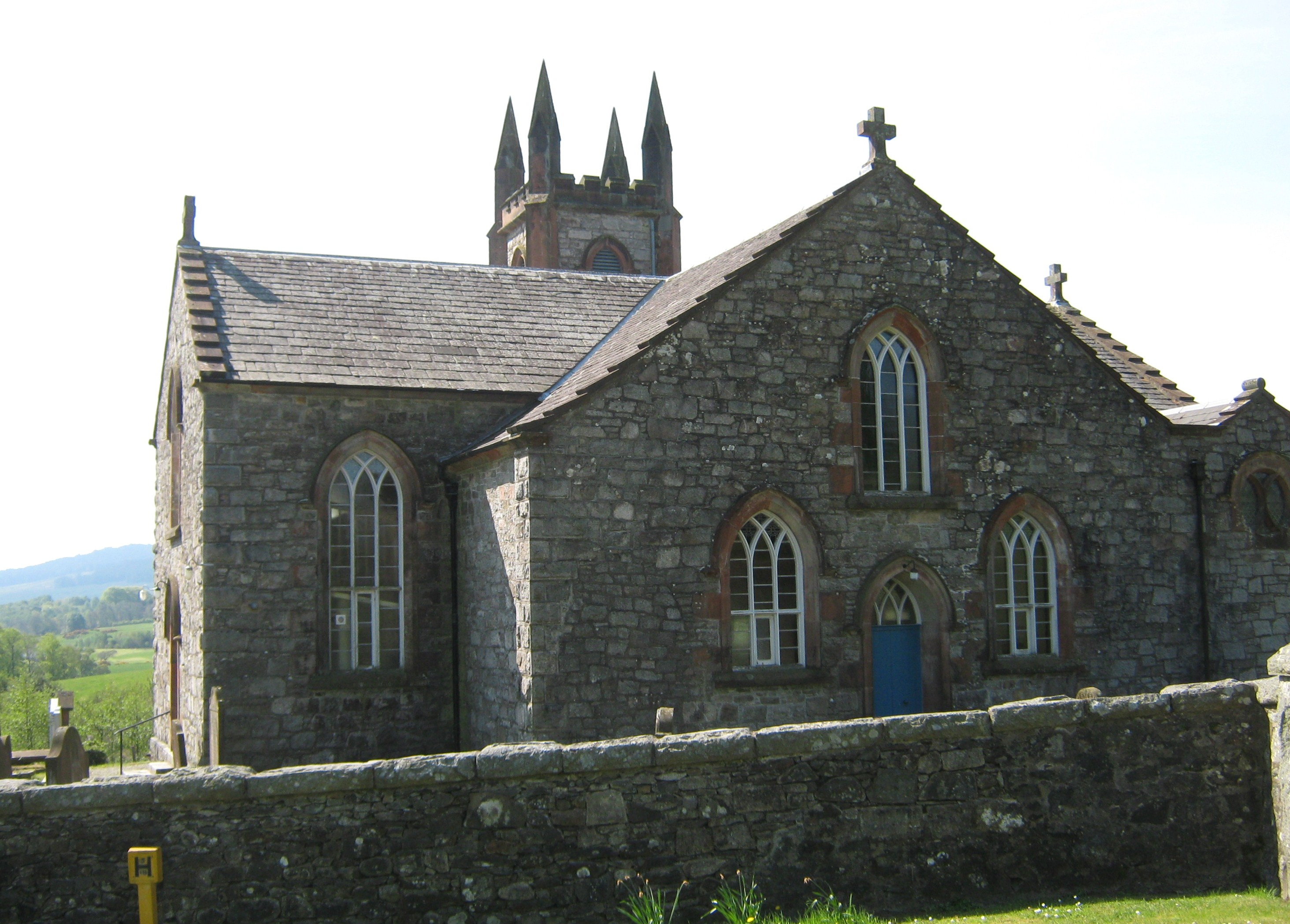
Kells Church

He was born in the manse at Minnigaff on 18 October 1797 the son of John Garlies Maitland of Fairgirth, minister of the parish. He studied at the University of Edinburgh and was licensed to preach by the Presbytery of Wigtown in January 1822.

From 1822 to 1825 he assisted Andrew Brown at the Old Kirk of St Giles in Edinburgh. In November 1825 he was presented by the crown to the congregation of Kells in Dumfriesshire and was formally ordained there in September 1826. In March 1852 the University of Glasgow awarded him an honorary Doctor of Divinity.

In 1860 he succeeded John Cook as Moderator of the General Assembly of the Church of Scotland the highest position in the Scottish Church. He was succeeded in turn by Colin Smith.

He died on 21 September 1872 and was succeeded by Thomas Nicol who served as Moderator in 1914.

== Family ==
In October 1826 he married Jessie Norval daughter of Corby Swindell Norval of Boghall near Linlithgow. Their children included:

- Katherine Margaret Maitland (1828-1856) married Dr Elliot Voyle Davies
- Garlies Corby Maitland (1830-1860)
- Charlotte Hope Maitland (1831-1852)
- Jessie Norval Maitland (1832-1835)
- Margaret Scott Maitland (1833-1860) married George Hamilton, Steward-Clerk of Kirkcudbright

Jessie died in August 1835 and in September 1837 Maitland married Louisa Bellamy (c.1815-1899) daughter of Charles Bellamy HEICS and his wife Louisa Gordon heiress of Adam Gordon, Viscount Kenmure (inheriting Kenmure Castle). Their children included:

- Col John Gordon Maitland (1838-1897) Colonel in Chief of the Galloway Rifles
- Louisa Bellamy Maitland (1840-1852)
- Frances Mary (b.1842)
- Eleanor Forbes (b.1845)
- Jane Agnes (b.1847)
- James Charles Maitland of Kenmure (1850-1915)
- Norval Falconer Maitland (b.1851)
- Louis Herbert Maitland (b.1854)

== Publications ==
- Account of the Parish of Kells (1845)
