= Gaddesden Place =

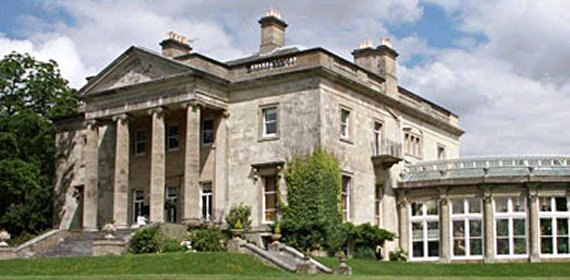
- Gaddesden Place

- Location within Hertfordshire

General information
- Type: English country house
- Architectural style: Palladian/Neoclassical
- Location: Red Lion Lane; Great Gaddesden; Hemel Hempstead; HP2 6EX, Great Gaddesden, United Kingdom
- Coordinates: 51°47′20″N 00°29′46″W
- Construction started: 1768
- Completed: 1773
- Renovated: 1905
- Client: Halsey baronets
- Owner: Charles Moir

Design and construction
- Architect: James Wyatt
- Designations: Grade II* listed building

Renovating team
- Architect: Cole A Adams

Website
- www.gaddesden-place.com

Gaddesden Place is a country house located near Hemel Hempstead in Hertfordshire, England. It was designed by architect James Wyatt and was built between 1768 and 1773, and was the home of the Hertfordshire Halsey family.

The house is set in an elevated position overlooking the Gade Valley.

== History ==
The Halseys moved to Great Gaddesden in 1458 and later became lessees of the Rectory of Gaddesden until 12 March 1545. When King Henry VIII dissolved the monasteries during the Reformation, he granted the estate of Kings Langley Priory to William Hawes (or Halsey, also Chambers).

The Halsey family residence was at the Golden Parsonage, a sixteenth-century mansion situated in Gaddesden Row. Thomas Halsey (1731–1788) MP erected a new mansion, Gaddesden Place, to Wyatt's design, about a mile south-west of the Golden Parsonage. In 1774 the family moved to Gaddesden Place, and the Golden Parsonage was partially demolished. In 1788, Thomas Halsey died, leaving the estate to his only surviving daughter, Sarah. She married Joseph Thompson Whately, and he adopted took the Halsey name and coat of arms.

Gaddesden Place was gutted by fire on 1 February 1905, and was subsequently rebuilt in 1908 by Cole A. Adams. The quadrant links and north and south pavilions were demolished in 1955 and 1963 because of dry rot.

The building was purchased in 1984 by the technology entrepreneur Charles Moir, founder of the software company Computer Concepts, now known as Xara. Since then, Gaddesden Place has been the headquarters of Xara Group Ltd. In 2007, Xara was acquired by the German software company Magix.

== Architecture ==
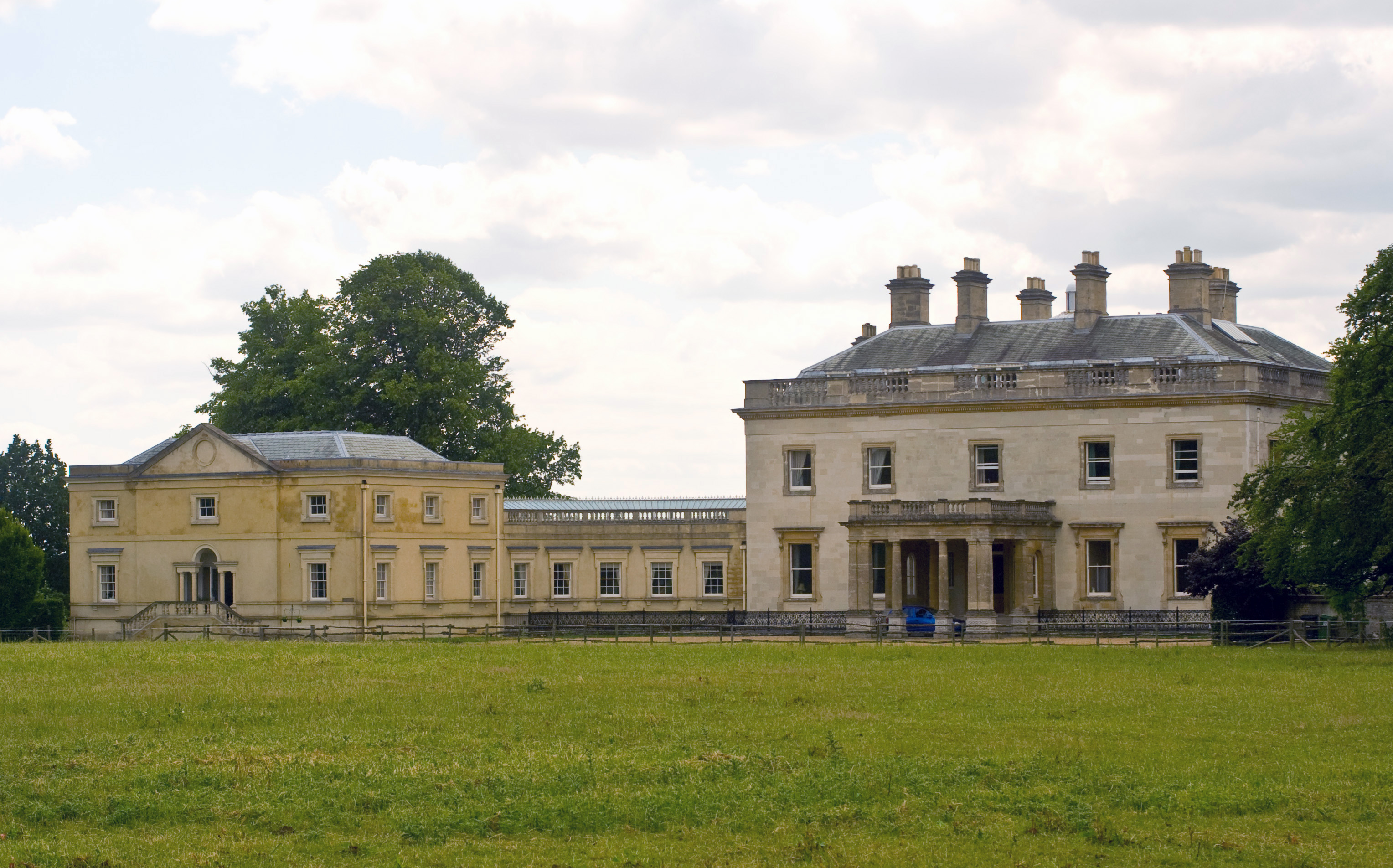
The north side of Gaddesden Place with the main entrance and east wing

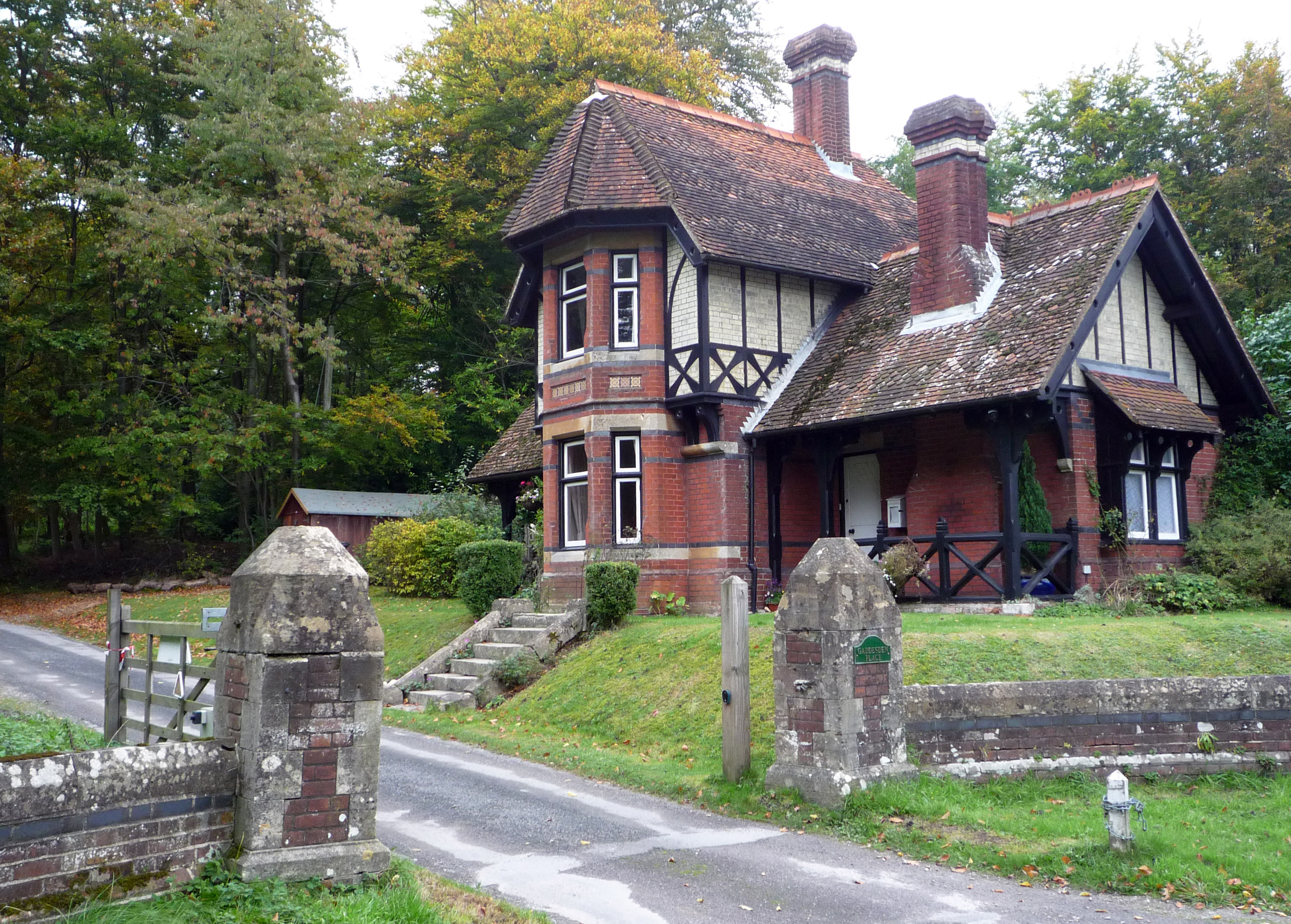
Gaddesden Place gatehouse

Gaddesden Place is a Grade II* listed building and is a noted example of Palladian architecture. It is said to be Wyatt's first country work and represents his conformity at the start of his active career to the English Palladian tradition.

It features an entrance surrounded by a 19th-century porte-cochère. On the south side, overlooking the valley, there is a large central portico of five bays (rebuilt 1905) supported by ionic columns. A distinctive semicircular single-storey conservatory, added in 1891, links to an outer wing which has Venetian windows.

At the entrance to the grounds on Red Lion Lane there is an 1870 half-timbered brick and Bath stone gatehouse lodge, which is Grade II listed.

The landscaped gardens, which feature a pair of Atlas cedars were laid out by Edward Kemp in 1872.

== In popular culture ==
Gaddesden Place and its grounds have been frequently used as film locations. The house was used as the location for Villa Diodati in Ken Russel's 1986 horror film, Gothic, in which Lord Byron (Gabriel Byrne) entertains Mary Shelley (Natasha Richardson) and Percy Bysshe Shelley (Julian Sands).

It has also appeared in the TV series Lewis; in "The Once and Future Ex" episode of Jeeves and Wooster (1993), as Lord Worplesdon's New York residence; and in the Foyle's War episode, "A Lesson in Murder".

Other productions that have shot at Gaddesden Place have included Fanny by Gaslight (1944), A Kiss Before Dying (1991), Little Britain (2000–07), the ChuckleVision episode "The Mystery of Little Under Standing", The Legend of Tarzan (2016), The Current War (2018), Slaughterhouse Rulez (2018), and Holby City (s21e01 2019).
