= Sir Thomas Halsey, 3rd Baronet =

English cricketer, naval officer and Deputy Lieutenant (1898–1970)

Captain Sir Thomas Halsey Bt DSO DL JP
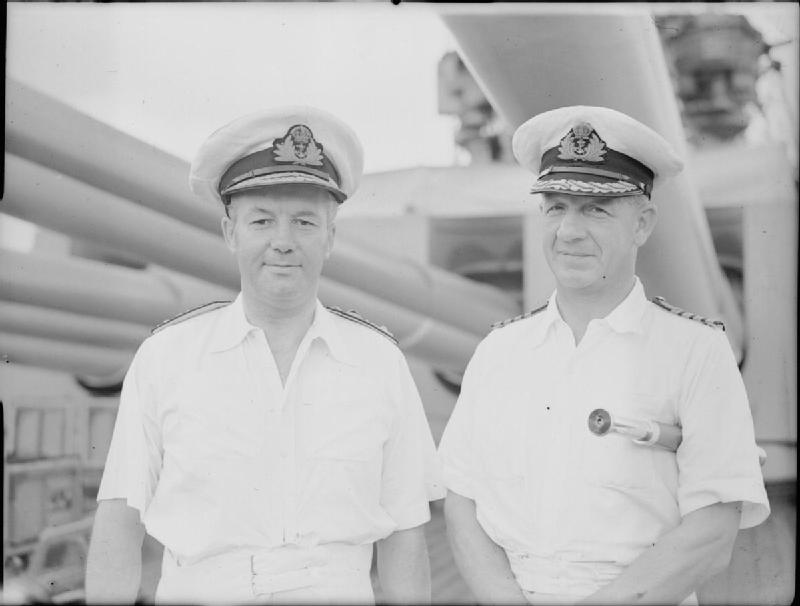
- Thomas Halsey (right) as Flag Captain of HMS King George V, with Arthur William La Touche Bisset (left), July 1943
- Born: Thomas Edgar Halsey; 28 November 1898; South Mimms, Hertfordshire, England
- Died: 30 August 1970 (aged 71); Hemel Hempstead, Hertfordshire, England
- Military career
- Allegiance: United Kingdom
- Branch: Royal Navy
- Service years: 1916–1946
- Rank: Captain
- Commands: HMS Boadicea, HMS Malcolm, HMS Badger (RN base, Harwich), Naval Officer-in-Charge, Isle of Man, HMS King George V, RNAS Lee-on-Solent (HMS Daedalus)
- Conflicts: World War I, World War II, Dunkirk
- Awards: Naval GSM; DSO; 39–45, Atlantic, and Europe stars; Defence & War medals; Mentioned in Despatches
- Other work: DL 1948, JP 1950, CC 1953, and Vice-Lieut. Herts. 1957–1970
- Cricket career

Cricket information
- Batting: Right-handed
- Bowling: Right-arm fast
- Role: Batsman

Domestic team information
- Years: Team
- 1920–1928: Royal Navy
- 1920: Cambridge University
- FC debut: 20 May 1920 Royal Navy v Cambridge University
- Last FC: 25 August 1928 Royal Navy v Royal Air Force

Career statistics
Competition	First-class
Matches	12
Runs scored	685
Batting average	38.05
100s/50s	1/4
Top score	102*
Balls bowled	565
Wickets	7
Bowling average	55.42
5 wickets in innings	0
10 wickets in match	0
Best bowling	2/78
Catches/stumpings	5/–
- Source: CricketArchive, 7 June 2008

Sir Thomas Edgar Halsey, 3rd Baronet, DSO (28 November 1898 – 30 August 1970) was an English cricketer, naval officer (1916–1946), and Deputy Lieutenant of Hertfordshire.

A right-handed batsman and right-arm fast bowler, he played first-class cricket between 1920 and 1928 and also represented an Egypt team.

== Early life ==
Born in South Mimms in 1898, Halsey was the elder son of Sir Walter Halsey, 2nd Baronet, and his wife Agnes Marion, the daughter of William Macalpine Leny. He was educated at Eton College and Jesus College, Cambridge. He was already a lieutenant in the Royal Navy when he went up to Cambridge.

== Cricketer ==
Halsey was a right-handed batsman and right-arm fast bowler.

He played cricket for Eton in 1915 and 1916, but it was for the Royal Navy cricket team that he made his first-class debut, playing against his university side during the 1920 English cricket season.

He played twice for the university cricket team in 1920, but did not gain his blue. The rest of his first-class matches were all for the Royal Navy, mostly against the British Army cricket team, though there were also matches against the RAF and New Zealand.

He began to play minor counties cricket for Hertfordshire in 1921, continuing to play for them until 1932, a year in which he played for the Navy against a combined South America team. In 1936, he played for Egypt against HM Martineau's XI, captaining the side and scoring a century in the first innings.

== Naval officer ==
- HMS Hawkins (cruiser) (China Station) 30 Apr 1925 – May 1926
- HMS Victory 31 Jan 1927 – Jul 1927
- HMS Effingham (cruiser) (East Indies Station) 1 Feb 1929 – Feb 1931
- HMY Victoria and Albert (Royal yacht) 20 Jan 1932 – Jan 1934
- Commanding Officer, HMS Boadicea (destroyer) (Mediterranean Fleet) 3 Aug 1934 – Feb 1936
- Senior Officers' War Course (HMS President) 12 October 1936 – Feb 1937
- an Assistant to Naval Assistant to Second Sea Lord (HMS President) 8 Mar 1937 – Apr 1939
- Commanding Officer, the destroyer HMS Malcolm (flotilla leader) & Captain (D), 16th Destroyer Flotilla, 31 Jul 1939 – 25 Jun 1940 & 12 Aug 1940 – 22 Oct 1940.
- HMS Badger (RN base, Harwich), Feb 1941–4 Feb 1942
- Naval Officer-in-Charge, Isle of Man & CO Training establishment HMS St George, Douglas, Isle of Man 4 Feb 1942–(08.1942)
- Flag Captain, the battleship HMS King George V, 15 Feb 1943 – 10 Apr 1945.
- Commodore RNAS Lee-on-Solent (HMS Daedalus) 1945–1946

He was appointed a Companion of the Distinguished Service Order (DSO) on 7 June 1940 "for good services in the withdrawal of the Allied Armies from the beaches at Dunkirk".

== County officer ==
Halsey retired from the Navy with the rank of captain in 1946, and went on to serve as Deputy Lieutenant for Herts from 1948, a JP from 1950, County Councillor from 1953, and Vice-Lieutenant for Herts from 1957 until his death at Hemel Hempstead in 1970.

== Marriage and children ==
Halsey married Jean Margaret Palmer, daughter of Bertram Brooke, onetime Tuan Muda of Sarawak, and through him, granddaughter of the second White Rajah of Sarawak, Charles Brooke. They had one son and two daughters.

== See also ==
- Halsey Baronets

Baronetage of the United Kingdom
Preceded by Walter Halsey	Baronet (of Gaddesdon, Hertfordshire); 2 Sep 1950 – 30 Aug 1970	Succeeded by John Halsey
