= New York Peace Society =

The New York Peace Society was the first peace society to be established in the United States. It has had several different incarnations, as it has merged into other organizations or dissolved and then been re-created.

== First incarnation (1815–1828) ==
David Low Dodge founded the society in 1815, soon after the end of the War of 1812. It became an active organization, holding regular weekly meetings, and producing literature which was spread as far as Gibraltar and Malta, describing the horrors of war and advocating pacificism on Christian grounds.

In 1828, the society merged with others in New Hampshire, Maine, and Massachusetts to form the American Peace Society.

== Second and third incarnations (1837–1844) ==
The society was re-formed as an independent organization in 1837. Until 1844, it sought to prevent war against Mexico by advocating negotiation. It then dissolved. An attempt was made to re-create it, but this was short-lived.

== Fourth incarnation (1906–1940) ==
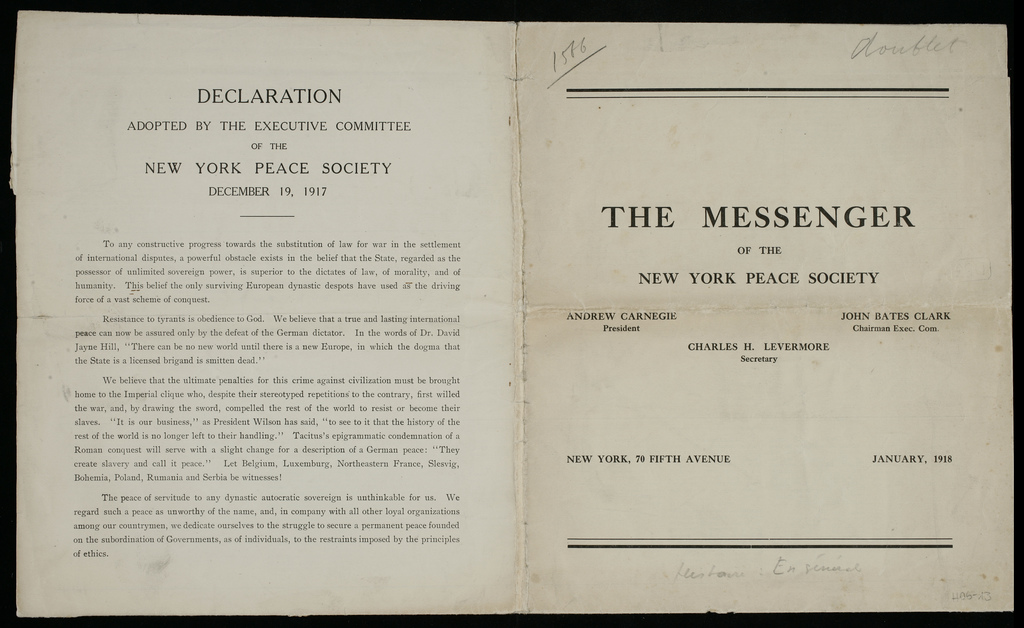
The Messenger of the New York Peace Society, 1918

The society was founded anew for the final time in 1906, in the context of the Philippine–American War, the rapid expansion of American influence and military usage abroad and the rise of the Anti-Imperialist League. It was organized by Oscar Straus and Charles Levermore with the support of steel magnate Andrew Carnegie.

The society was involved in a "National Arbitration and Peace Conference" in 1907. During the First World War, the society helped to organize the League to Enforce Peace in opposition to American involvement.

In 1940, the society merged into the Quaker World Alliance for International Friendship through Religion.

== See also ==
- List of anti-war organizations
- Society of Peace
- The Castle of Peace
- Pacifism in the United States
