= James Bisset (minister) =

Scottish minister

James Bisset (1795–1872) was a minister of the Church of Scotland and Latinist, who served as Moderator of the General Assembly in 1862, the highest position in the Scottish church.

== Life ==
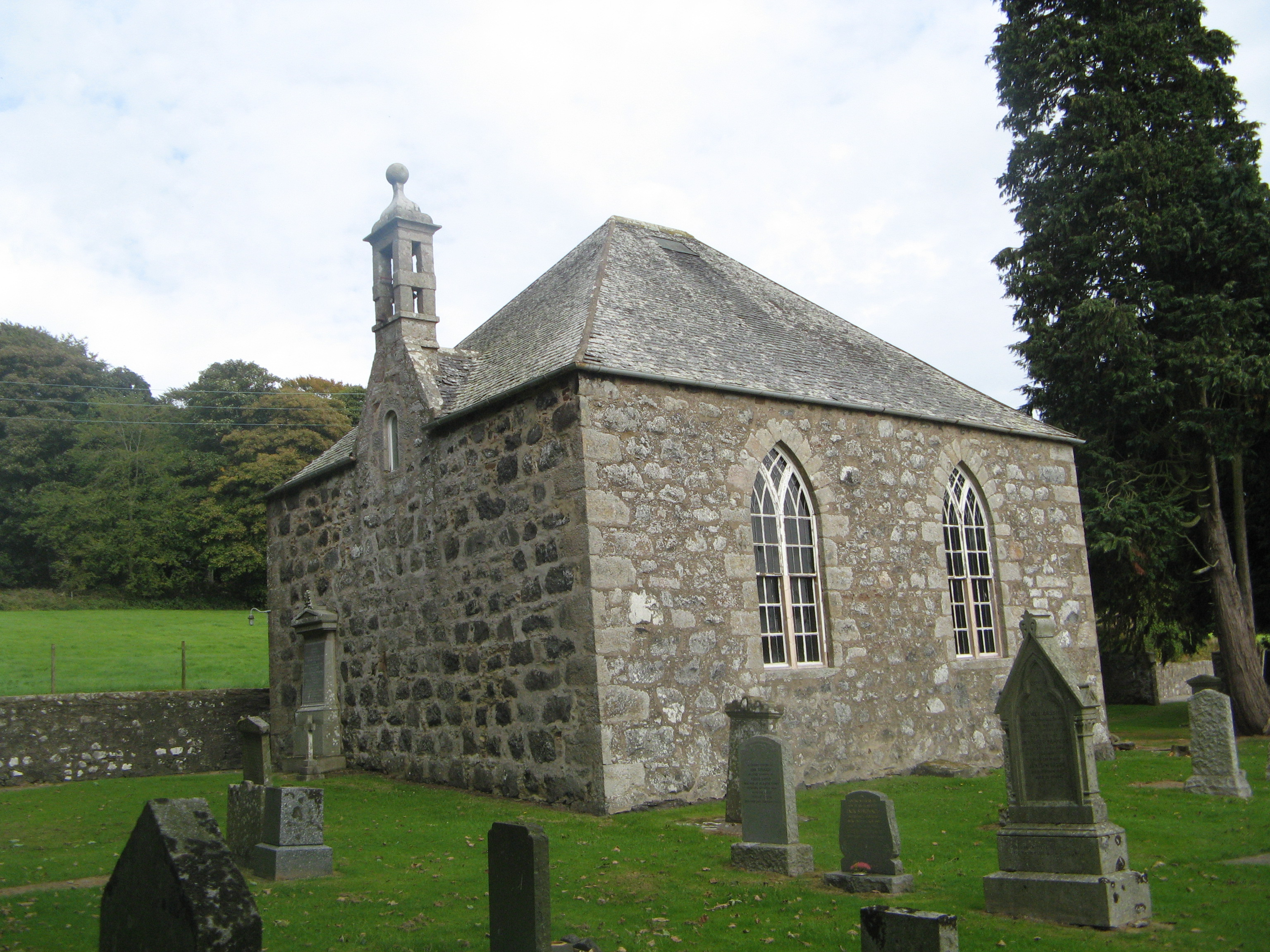
Bourtie Church

He was born in April 1795 the second son of George Bisset, schoolmaster of Udny Academy north of Aberdeen. James took over the running of the Academy in 1812 at age 17. He attended Marischal College in Aberdeen sporadically (1808/9, 1817/8, 1818/9) and also attended Edinburgh University for some sessions. He became private tutor to the family of Fraser of Strichen (later known as Lord Lovat. In March 1819 he was licensed to preach by the Presbytery of Ellon.

In June 1825 under patronage of the Crown he was presented to the congregation of Bourtie and was formally ordained there in April 1826.

Continuing occasional university attendance at Marischal College he eventually graduated MA in 1839 aged 44. In February 1850 they further awarded him an honorary Doctor of Divinity.

In 1862 he succeeded the Rev Colin Smith as Moderator of the General Assembly of the Church of Scotland the highest position in the Scottish Church. He was succeeded in turn by Rev James Craik.

He died in the manse at Bourtie on 8 September 1872.

== Family ==
In December 1829 he married Mary Bannerman Lessel (d.1836), daughter of Rev Robert Lessel minister of the neighbouring parish of Inverurie. Their children included:

- Mary Bisset (b.1830) married Rev Dr John Davidson her father's successor as minister of Inverurie
- Susan Bisset (b.1832) married Henry Campbell Raikes as his first wife
- James Bisset (1833-1901) became a banker in Brantford in Canada
- Christian Helen Bisset (1835-1857) died in Cawnpore in India during the Indian mutiny
- Robina Mary Bannerman Lessel Bisset (b.1836-1911) married Henry Campbell Raikes as his second wife

His first wife died giving birth to Robina. In June 1840 he married Elizabeth Sinclair Smith (1823-1890) daughter of Rev William Smith of Bower. Their children included:

- George Thomas Bisset (1841-1852)
- Sir William Sinclair Smith Bisset KCIE (1843-1917) Government Director of Indian Railways for all India
- Elizabeth Sinclair Bisset (b.1845) married Dr Henry Muscroft of Pontefract

== Publications ==
- Account of the Parish of Bourtie (1845)
- Inquiry into the Spirit of the Constitution of the Church of Scotland (1866)
