= Halsey baronets =

Baronetcy in the Baronetage of the United Kingdom

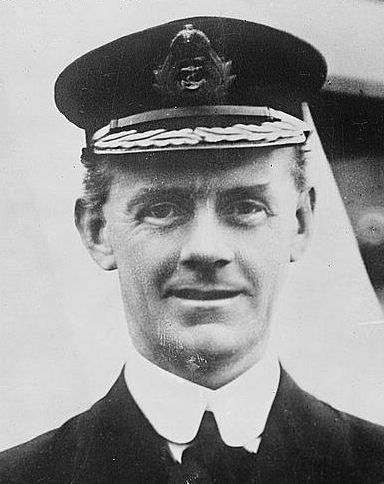
Admiral Sir Lionel Halsey, fourth son of the first Halsey Baronet

The Halsey Baronetcy, of Gaddesden in the County of Hertford, is a title in the Baronetage of the United Kingdom. It was created on 22 June 1920 for the Conservative politician Frederick Halsey. The third Baronet was a captain in the Royal Navy. The fourth Baronet is an Anglican priest and Brother of the Community of the Transfiguration, Midlothian.

Thomas Plumer Halsey, father of the first Baronet, was also a politician. Sir Lionel Halsey, fourth son of the first Baronet, was an Admiral in the Royal Navy.

== Halsey baronets, of Gaddesden (1920) ==
- Sir Thomas Frederick Halsey, 1st Baronet (1839–1927)
- Sir Walter Halsey, 2nd Baronet (1868–1950)
- Sir Thomas Halsey, 3rd Baronet (1898–1970)
- John Halsey (born 1933), the 4th Baronet, does not use his title.

The heir presumptive is the present holder's second cousin Nicholas Guy Halsey (born 1948). His heir apparent is his son Guy Francis Johnston Halsey (born 1981).
