= Nadia Habash =

Palestinian architect (born 1959)

- نادية حبش
- Born: 1959 (age 66–67); Jerusalem
- Occupations: Engineer, architect, lecturer

Academic background
- Education: University of Jordan (BA), University of Michigan (MA)

Academic work
- Discipline: Architectural engineering
- Institutions: Birzeit University

Nadia Habash is a Palestinian architect and head of the Palestinian Engineers Association, the first female leader of the syndicate. She is also an adjunct lecturer in the Department of Architecture at Birzeit University.

== Biography ==
Nadia Habash was born in Jerusalem in 1959. She graduated from the University of Jordan with an architecture major in 1982, and obtained a master's degree in Professional Architectural Design and Design Theory Philosophy at the University of Michigan in 1986. She began work as a professor of architecture at Birzeit University in August 2005, where she was one of the founders of the Department of Architecture in the Faculty of Engineering and Technology. She left academia in 1997 and opened her own engineering office, but returned to Birzeit in 2002. Habash was also formerly on the Ramallah municipal council.

Habash's work focuses on the restoration and revitalization of cultural heritage. She received a UNESCO grant to restore the mosaic of Hisham's Palace and its gardens between 2006 and 2010. In 2017, she received the Hassib Sabbagh & Said Khoury Engineering Award for the Arraba Palaces restoration project which involved the restoration and rehabilitation of the palaces of Arraba. In 2019 she was chosen by Middle East Architect magazine as one of the 50 most influential architects of the region. Among other projects, Habash designed Birzeit University's Samir Owaida Building, housing the School of Arts, Music and Design.

Nadia Habash joined the Palestinian Engineers Association (PEA), the Palestinian branch of the Engineers Association in Jordan and Palestine (also called the Engineers Association — Jerusalem Center), in 1982; in August 2021 she became the first woman to be elected head of the association in Palestine and Jordan. She headed the “Determination List” in the polls, endorsed by the Popular Front for the Liberation of Palestine and Hamas.

Habash has described her architecture as a form of resistance to "systematic destruction by the Israeli occupation". In 1988 she was banned from leaving the West Bank by Israel because of her social activism. After appealing to the Supreme Court of Israel, the ban was lifted in 2017. In 2022 she led the PEA in protest against the Palestinian Authority demanding financial rights for civil engineers.
