= ACWA =

ACWA may refer to:

- ACWA, environmental company acquired by Consolidated Contractors Company
- ACWA Power, the energy division of the Saudi Arabian Al-Muhaidib group of companies
- ACWA Services Ltd., UK based water treatment company
- Advisory Committee on Works of Art, committee of the UK houses of Parliament
- Adventist College of West Africa, predecessor of Babcock University, a religiously founded Nigerian university
- Alberta Co-operative Wholesale Association, a Canadian Cooperative enterprise
- Amalgamated Clothing Workers of America, US labor union
- American Catch Wrestling Association, an organization for catch wrestling founded by MMA fighter Josh Barnett
- American Civil War Association of Northern and Central California, American Civil War reenactment group
- Program Executive Office, Assembled Chemical Weapons Alternatives, department of the US Army responsible for chemical weapons decommissioning
- Association of California Water Agencies, coalition of public water agencies supplying water in California
- Association of Clean Water Administrators, a professional water quality organization in the United States
