= Institute for Communications Law Studies =

Coordinates: 38.936°N 76.997°W

Law and Technology Institute
- Established: 1981
- Parent institution: The Catholic University of America, Columbus School of Law
- Director: Donna Gregg
- Location: Washington, D.C., US
- Website: http://www.law.edu/clinics/institutes/cli.cfm

The Law and Technology Institute or LTI, formerly Institute for Communications Law Studies, is one of the institutes for specialized study within the Columbus School of Law at The Catholic University of America, in Washington, D.C. The Law and Technology Institute specifically focuses on the areas telecommunications, technology, data privacy, cybersecurity, intellectual property and media law and policy.

== History ==
The Law and Technology Institute was established as the Institute for Communications Law Studies in 1981 by Catholic University of America Law Professor Harvey Zuckman.

== Director ==
The current directors of the Law and Technology Institute are Professors Elizabeth Winston and Megan M. La Belle.

== Campus ==
The Law and Technology Institute is located within the Columbus School of Law.

== Curriculum ==
In addition to their normal legal coursework, Juris Doctor candidates in the Law and Technology Institute receive a certificate in their field of study after completing a curriculum in communications law and related subjects along with three externships in the communications, privacy or intellectual property fields of law.

== Co-curricular activities ==
There are several communications law related co-curricular activities at the Columbus School of Law including the Journal of Law and Technology, formerly called CommLaw Conspectus: Journal of Communications Law and Policy, a team that competes in the National Communications Moot Court Competition, and the CUA Communications Law Students Association.

== Symposia ==
The Law and Technology Institute co-sponsors regular communications law symposium.

== Notable alumni ==
- Brendan Carr, Commissioner of the Federal Communications Commission
- David Redl, Assistant Secretary for Communications and Information at the United States Department of Commerce
