= Bethlehem Convention Palace =

Convention center in Bethlehem, Palestine

Coordinates: 31°41′25.9″N 35°10′06.9″E

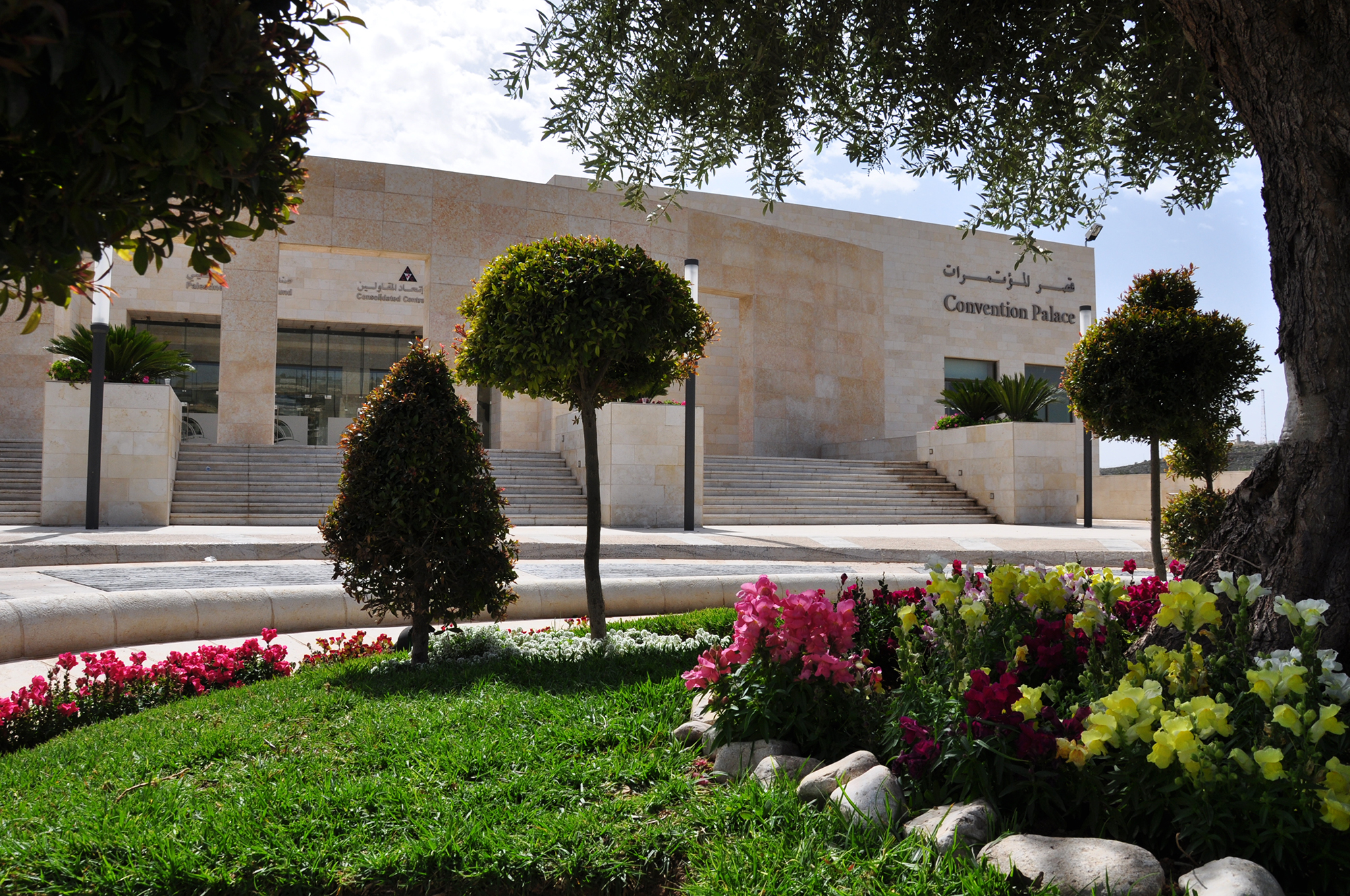
Convention Palace, Bethlehem 2011

The Bethlehem Convention Palace, run by the Convention Palace Company (CPC; Arabic: قصر المؤتمرات بيت لحم, romanized: Qaṣr al-Muʼtamarāt Bayt Laḥm), is a convention center facility in Bethlehem, Palestine.

The building includes a main meeting hall, exhibition gallery, theatre, meeting rooms, gardens, interfaith prayer room and cafeteria. There is also a large amphitheater that can host nearly 1,500 people.,

Neighboring landmarks, also administered by the CPC, are Solomon's Pools and the Burak or Murad Castle.

== History ==
=== Solomon's Pools ===
According to the Times of Israel, "the three Solomon's Pools ... were built by Herod the Great around 2,000 years ago and were key sources of water for the Second Temple and the city ... An aqueduct carried the water from the pools to Jerusalem 21 kilometers away (13 miles)".

In 2017, the U.S. Consulate in Jerusalem funded a $750,000 restoration project at Solomon's Pools, which were suffering from neglect. A 2017 report stated that "the project will repair and protect canals and establish designated walking paths to protect the surrounding archaeological elements and allow visitors to tour the site without risk of damage, preserving the site in order to attract tourists to it, being an essential cultural and historic icon in Palestine..." A January 2019 report states that the US administration "recently decided to transfer $1.5 million to the Palestinian Authority for the restoration and preservation of Solomon's Pools".

=== Historical fortress ===
Qal'at al-Burak ('Burak Castle' or 'Castle of the Pools'), also known as Qal'at Murad ('Murad Castle'), is an Ottoman Turkish fortress, built by Suleiman the Magnificent or "the Law-giver" in 1617 near Solomon's Pools, and is part of the tourist complex open to visitors. It features a large museum.

=== Convention center ===
The convention palace is in the southern part of Bethlehem City, on 32,000sqm of land just opposite Solomon's Pools. It was built in response to the initiative of Yasser Arafat in 1999 after Hasib Sabbagh and Said Khoury proposed hosting the 2000 World Economic Forum in Bethlehem. The Convention Palace is a joint investment of the Consolidated Contractors Company "CCC" and Palestine Investment Fund "PIF".

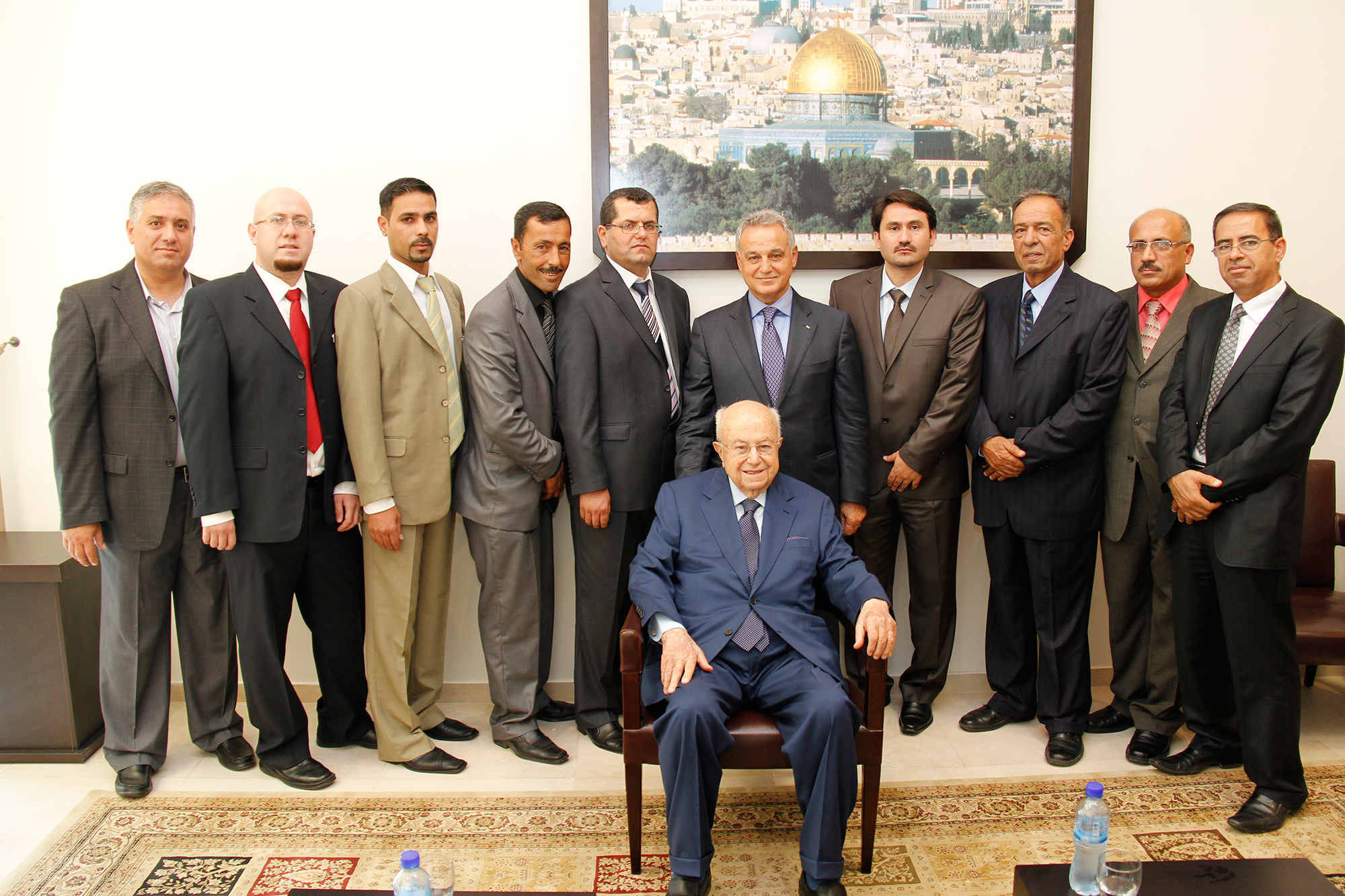
Saed Khoury at the Convention Palace with the Palace Management

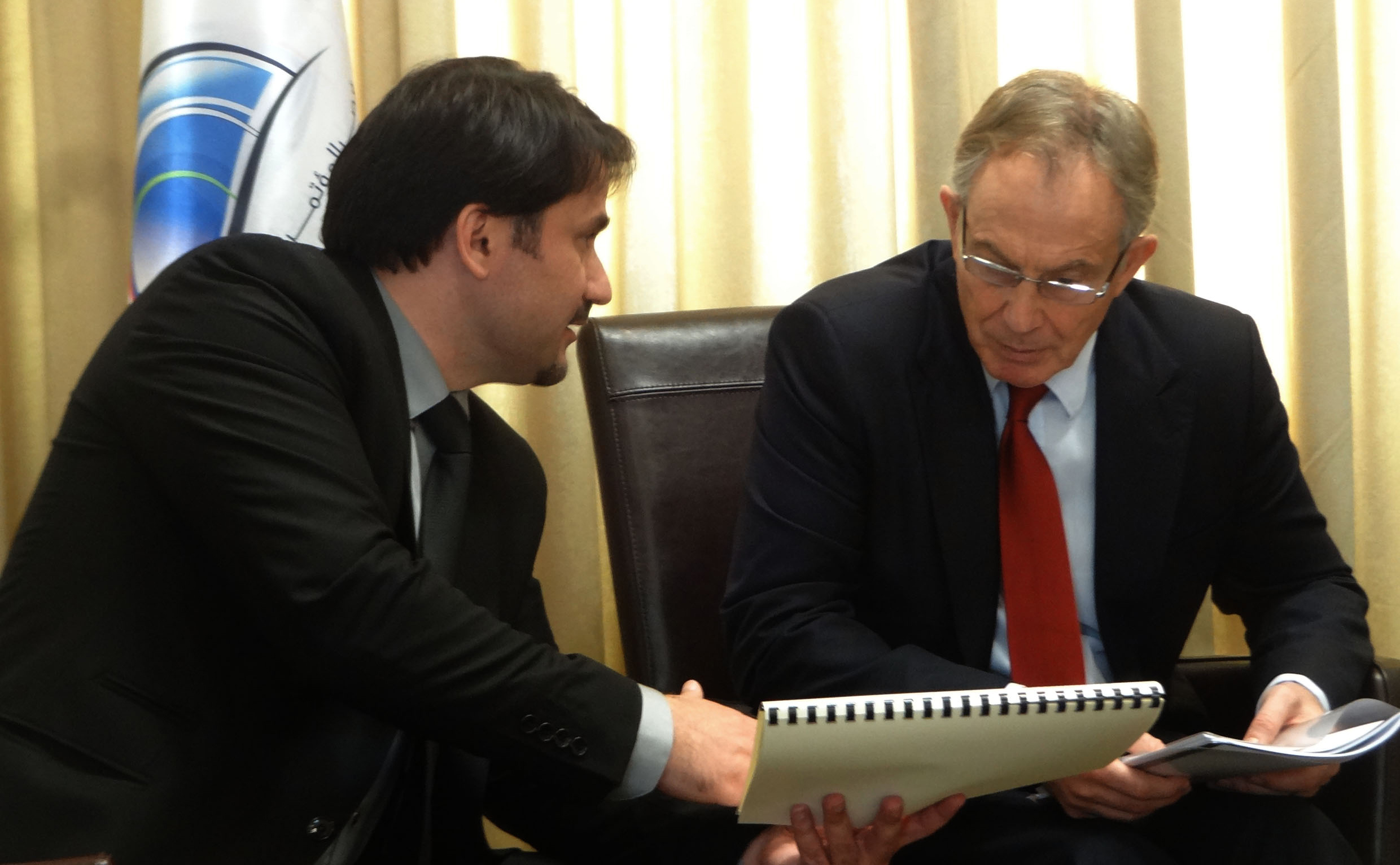
Tony Blair with George Bassous, General Manager of the Palace

The Convention Palace company published these specifics:

At the Southern part of Bethlehem City, the Convention Palace stands on 32,000sqm of land just opposite to the historic Solomon's Pools site with a total land area 240,000 sqm. The Construction of the Convention Palace came in response to the initiative of the late Palestinian President Yasser Arafat in 1999 to host the World Economic Forum of 2000 in the City of Bethlehem and for future local and international conferences in Palestine.

As of 2019, the General Manager of the Convention Palace - Solomon's Pools was George N Bassous.

== Convention Palace activities ==
CPC (Convention Palace Company) CPC Link operates and manages:

- Archaeological Site, 29,000sqm, of three historic Solomon's Pools, two of them dated to the Roman period and the third from the Ottoman period.
- Murad Castle (or Burâk Castle): the Ottoman fortress built for the protection of the pools' water with an area of 3500sqm. The Castle Museum houses one of the largest ethnographic collections of Palestinian history and culture. The Castle also includes the Kani Mani Restaurant serving "traditional biblical and Palestinian dishes".
- Handicraft Center built on 12000sqm, a commercial traditional bazaar.
- Natural heritage forest of 244,000sqm.

The Palestine Investment Conference was hosted at the Convention Palace in 2008 and 2010.
