= Alexandra Dunn =

American government employee (born 1967)

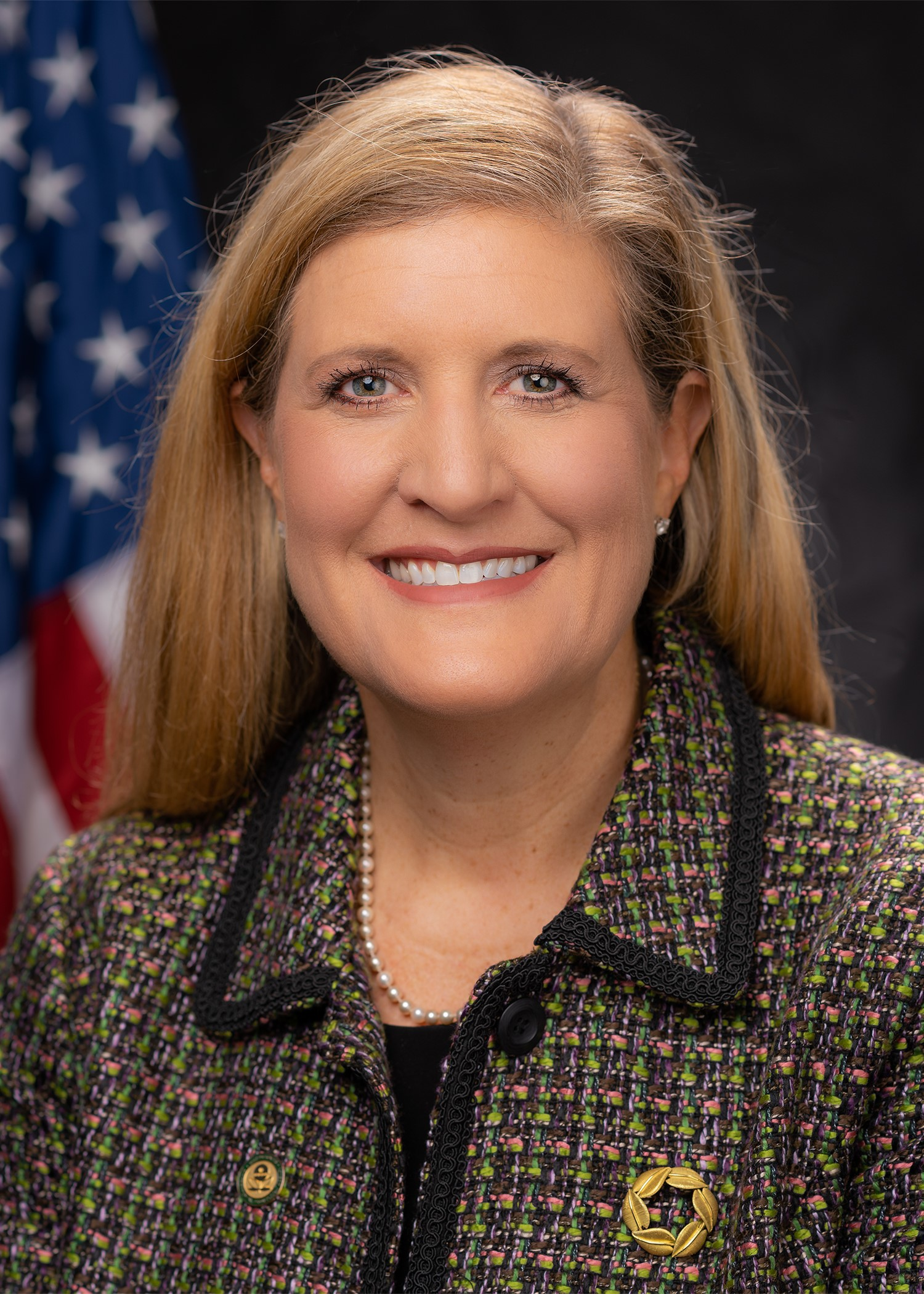

Assistant Administrator of the Environmental Protection Agency for Toxic Substances
- In office January 3, 2019 – January 20, 2021
- President: Donald Trump
- Preceded by: James Jones
- Succeeded by: Michal Freedhoff

Personal details
- Born: Alexandra Rebecca Dapolito; September 25, 1967 (age 59)
- Education: James Madison University (BA); Catholic University of America (JD)

Alexandra Dapolito Dunn (born September 25, 1967) is an American environmental lawyer and law professor, specializing in chemical and pesticide regulation, water quality issues, water treatment issues, urban development, rule of law, environmental justice, environmental conflict resolution, cooperative federalism, and implementation of the Clean Water Act and the Frank R. Lautenberg Chemical Safety for the 21st Century Act. She is the president and CEO of CropLife America as of February 2024. Dunn was an executive at several environmental management associations, and served as Regional Administrator for New England in the US Environmental Protection Agency (EPA), and Assistant Administrator for EPA's Office of Chemical Safety and Pollution Prevention.

== Early life and education ==
Dunn graduated from Cherry Hill East High School in New Jersey in 1985. She received a B.A. in political science from James Madison University, followed by a J.D. from the Columbus School of Law, where she was elected editor-in-chief of the law review. She is a member of the bar in D.C., Maryland, and New York, and the U.S. Supreme Court.

== Professional career ==
She began her career employed in private practice as an environmental associate at Winston & Strawn. She was subsequently a counsel for the American Chemistry Council, general counsel for the National Association of Clean Water Agencies (NACWA), executive director and general counsel of the Association of Clean Water Administrators, and executive director and general counsel of the Environmental Council of the States. She was involved in dozens of environmental cases representing parties and intervenors and contributing amicus curiae briefs. Dunn served as chair of the American Bar Association Section of Environment, Energy, and Resources, and served on the ABA Presidential Task force on Sustainable Development. Dunn was the first ABA section chair from the non-profit sector. She was a board member of the Environmental Law Institute from 2014 to December 2017, and is a member of its Leadership Council Steering Committee. She was also on the Executive Committee of the American College of Environmental Lawyers from October 2016 to December 2017.

In 2018, Dunn was selected to serve as the Administrator for the US Environmental Protection Agency’s Region 1 (New England). In January 2019, she was appointed by President Trump as the Assistant Administrator of the US Environmental Protection Agency’s Office of Chemical Safety and Pollution Prevention, where she was unanimously confirmed by the US Senate and served until 2021.

Following her service at the EPA, Dunn became a partner in the law firm of Baker Botts, LLP in its Environment, Safety, and Incident Response group. At Baker Botts, she helped to refine and deploy the "ACELAS" model for environmental justice and published numerous articles on contaminants of emerging concern, community engagement, and environmental enforcement.

In February 2024, Dunn became the president and CEO of the national trade association for the pesticide industry, CropLife America. The same year, she was elected as the president-elect of the American College of Environmental Lawyers.

In January 2025, Dunn was appointed by the United States Department of Agriculture to serve on the Agricultural Policy Advisory Committee.

== Academic career ==
Dunn was Dean of Environmental Law Programs and an adjunct professor of law at Pace Law School. At Pace, Dunn led efforts to create the nation's first L.L.M. in Environmental Law focused on climate change. Dunn is a lecturer in law at the Columbus School of Law at Catholic University of America, and a Professorial Lecturer in Law at George Washington University Law School. Previously she was an associate professor of law at American University’s Washington College of Law. She has published articles in a variety of scholarly journals, law reviews, and periodicals. Her research publications include cutting edge work on environmental justice, green infrastructure, and environmental conflict resolution, among other subjects.
