= CommLaw Conspectus =

- Discipline: Legal studies
- Language: English

Publication details
- Publisher: Catholic University of America, Columbus School of Law (United States)
- Frequency: Biannually

Standard abbreviations
- Bluebook: CommLaw Conspectus
- ISO 4: CommLaw Conspec.

Indexing
- ISSN: 1068-5871
- LCCN: 2009268119
- OCLC no.: 55536096

Links
- Journal homepage

The CommLaw Conspectus: Journal of Communications Law and Technology Policy is a biannual student-run journal of legal scholarship published by The Catholic University of America, Columbus School of Law.

== Overview ==
The CommLaw Conspectus publishes scholarly articles that discuss recent developments in communications law and policy. A typical issue contains three to four lead articles written by communications law scholars and practitioners and three to four student notes and comments. In addition, CommLaw Conspectus periodically publishes essays, book reviews, a bibliography of recent communications law books, and summaries of major communications law cases and U.S. Federal Communications Commission (FCC) dockets.

Issues of the CommLaw Conspectus have featured prefaces written by former FCC Chairman Michael K. Powell, Congressman Henry A. Waxman, and FTC Commissioner Maureen K. Ohlhausen.

== Staff and selection of membership ==
CommLaw Conspectus is a student-edited journal. Membership is determined solely by students' participation in a journal writing competition. Student's articles submitted through the journal writing competition are judged by the editorial staff, which considers factors such as legal analysis, argumentation, writing style, and citation format. Students chosen for membership serve one year as associates and may serve an additional year as members of the editorial staff.

== Symposia ==
The CommLaw Conspectus, in collaboration with the Institute for Communications Law Studies, hosts a yearly symposium on a select issue related to communications law and policy.
