= Catholic University Law Review =

- Discipline: Law
- Language: English

Publication details
- Former name(s): Law Review
- History: 1950–present
- Publisher: Columbus School of Law (United States)
- Frequency: Quarterly
- Impact factor: 0.309 (2020)

Standard abbreviations
- Bluebook: Cath. U. L. Rev.
- ISO 4: Cathol. Univ. Law Rev.

Indexing
- ISSN: 1530-6119
- LCCN: sf85003127
- OCLC no.: 35734699

Links
- Journal homepage

The Catholic University Law Review is a student-run quarterly law review published by the Columbus School of Law (The Catholic University of America).

== Overview ==
The journal was established in 1950 and is the Columbus School of Law's oldest legal journal. The Catholic University Law Review publishes articles, book reviews, and essays, in addition to notes and comments written by student staff members. Its 2016 impact factor was 0.309, ranking it 125th among 149 journals listed in the "Law" category of the Journal Citation Reports.

== Notable alumni ==
Notable alumni include Chief Judge Edward J. Damich of the United States Court of Federal Claims.

== Staff and selection of membership ==
The Law Review selects approximately 50 second- and third-year law students for membership. This selection occurs through the Law School's writing competition and students' academic performance. During the spring semester, first- and second-year students participate in a write-on competition, which is graded by editors. Of the group that participates in the competition, the review then selects its members from those who have the highest combined grade point average and writing competition score.

== Symposia ==
The Catholic University Law Review hosts a yearly symposium on a select area of law. Recent topics have included The State of Military Justice, the Judiciary Act of 1789, and FISA and the 4th Amendment, among others.

== Abstracting and indexing ==
The review is abstracted and indexed in:

- AgeLine
- Arts and Humanities Citation Index
- The Catholic Periodical and Literature Index
- Current Contents
- Current Law Index
- Family Index
- Index to Legal Periodicals and Books
- LegalTrac
- Peace Research Abstracts Journal
- Scopus
- Social Sciences Citation Index
