= Catholic law =

Catholic law may refer to:

- Catholic Law, the law school of The Catholic University of America in Washington, D.C.
- Canon law of the Catholic Church

== See also ==
- Category:Catholic law schools in the United States
