= John F. Dean =

American judge (born 1946)

John F. Dean (born 1946 in Washington D.C.) is a former special trial judge of the United States Tax Court. He was appointed to be a Special Trial Judge on August 7, 1994. Dean has the distinction of being the first African-American judicial officer appointed to the court.

Dean graduated from Michigan State University with a B.S. in 1970. He attended Columbus School of Law at the Catholic University of America, earning his J.D. in 1975, followed by a Master of Laws in Taxation from the Georgetown University Law Center in 1985. He was employed by the Office of Chief Counsel for the Internal Revenue Service, Dallas District Counsel, 1975–1978; Baltimore District Counsel, 1978–1986; Office of Associate Chief Counsel, International, 1986–1994. Adjunct Professor of Law, Howard University, 1999 to present; Vice Chair, Judicial Counsel of the Washington Bar Association, 2002–2003.

Dean was appointed as a Special Trial Judge, United States Tax Court, on August 7, 1994, and retired in July 2014.
