= Sultan's Pool =

Historical site and event venue

- בריכת הסולטן (Hebrew) بركة السلطان (Arabic)
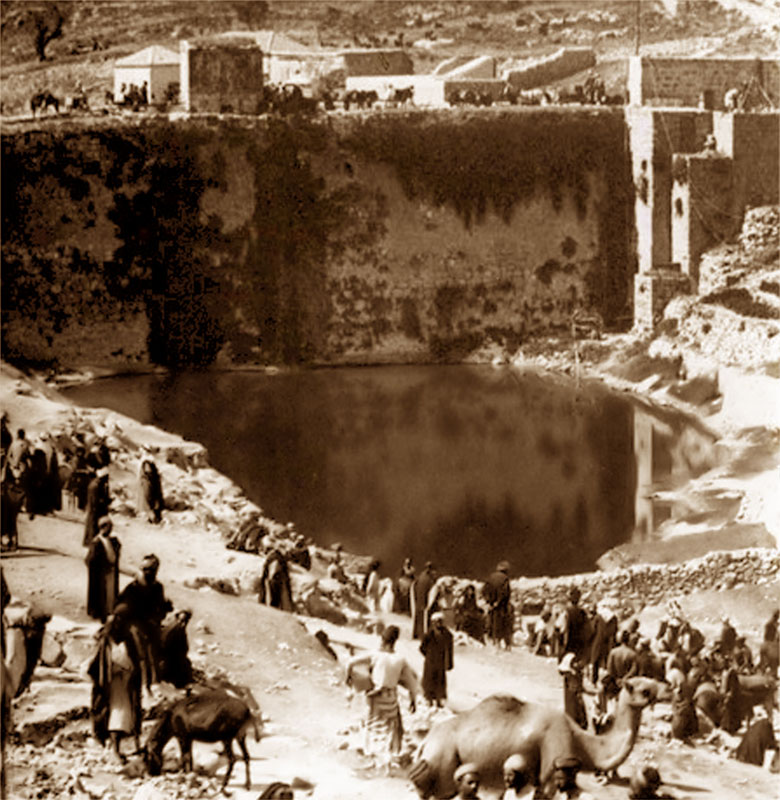
- Sultan's Pool during the late Ottoman period

- Location within Old City of Jerusalem
- 31°46.310′N 35°13.585′E
- Location: Valley of Hinnom

History
- Built: Various periods (Hasmonean, Roman, Ottoman)
- Built by: Hasmoneans, Herod the Great, Suleiman the Magnificent

Site notes
- Material: Stone, mortar
- Condition: Preserved
- Public access: Yes

The Sultan's Pool (Hebrew: בריכת הסולטן, romanized: Brechat ha-Sultan; Arabic: بركة السلطان, romanized: Birket es-Sultan) is an ancient water basin to the west side of Mount Zion, Jerusalem.

The Sultan's Pool was part of the water supply network for Jerusalem from the late Second Temple period to the late Ottoman period. Today, it is an event venue for concerts and festivals.

== History ==
The Sultan's Pool was created by building a dam across the Valley of Hinnom, which stopped the drainage of the valley south towards the Kidron Valley and created a water reservoir. In place of the dam, an ancient bridge had previously passed, over which the lower aqueduct that carried water from Solomon's Pools near Bethlehem to Jerusalem and the Temple Mount passed. The confusing online release of the Israel Antiquities Authority mentions the Hasmonean-built Low-level Aqueduct (2nd–1st centuries BCE) at the same spot where archaeologists discovered "four phases of different aqueducts that were constructed in exactly the same spot" starting in the Byzantine-period, the 6th–7th centuries CE. The next three phases were Ottoman (16th century and later).

A covered and plastered rock-hewn canal from the Roman period was discovered throughout the pool; it is likely from the time of Herod. Some scholars identify it with the Snake Pool mentioned by Josephus.

During the Crusader period, it was known as Lacus Germani.

The Pool was renovated during the early Ottoman period by Suleiman the Magnificent (r. 1520–1566 CE), who enlarged it into a reservoir measuring 67 m × 169 m × 12 m (220 ft × 554 ft × 39 ft). Subsequently, the place was later renamed the Sultan's Pool. On the pool dam, Suleiman the Magnificent built a sebil for the use of pedestrians, which has been preserved to this day. Today, the Hebron Road passes over the dam.

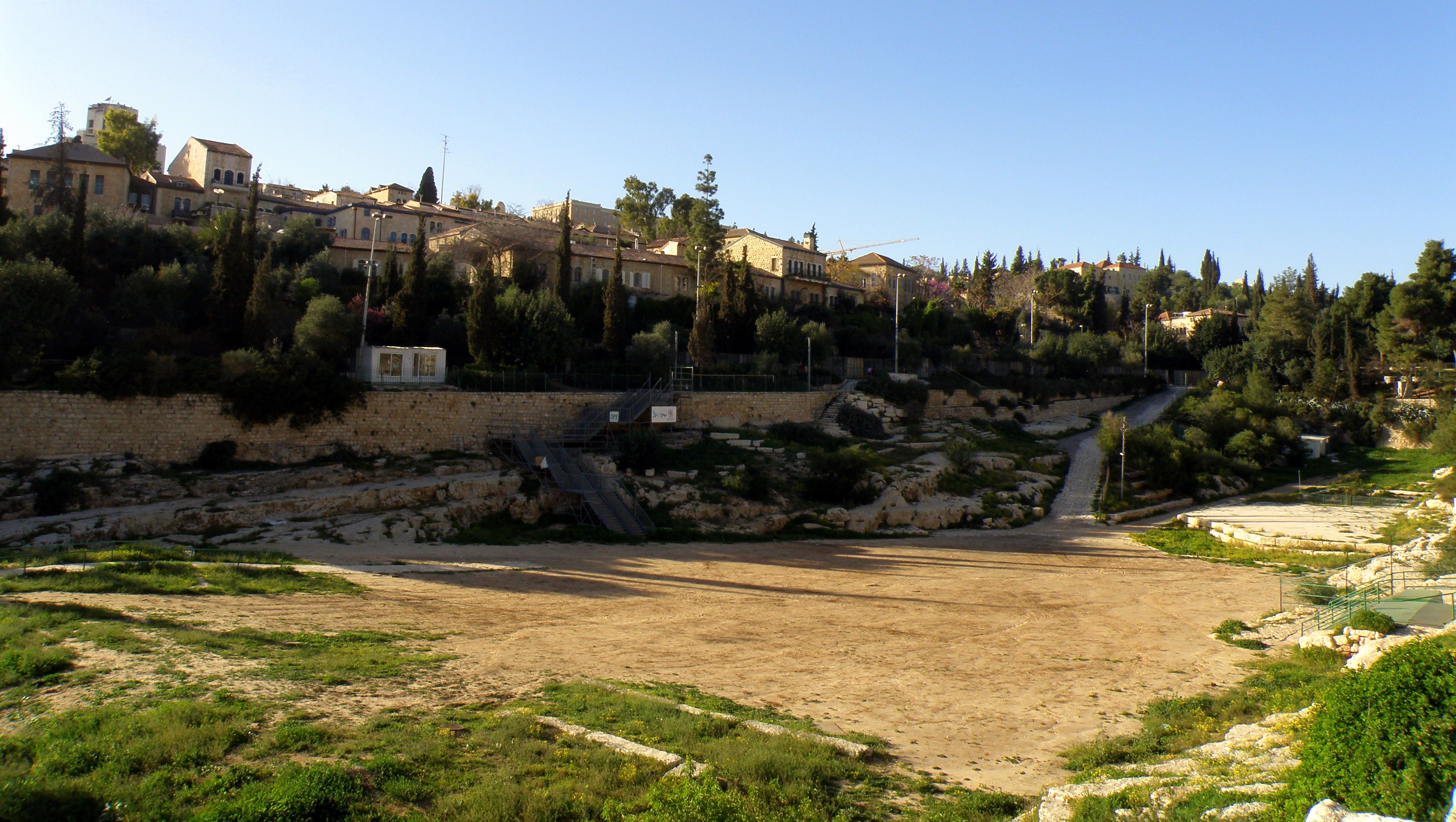
Sultan's Pool as it appears today

== Event venue ==
The Sultan's Pool is dry in summer and is used as a major event venue for concerts and festivals. Many international artists have performed at the site during their visit to Israel, including Dire Straits (who played the second concert of the Brothers in Arms Tour in the Sultan in 1985), Eurythmics, Leonard Cohen, James Taylor, Eric Clapton, Bob Dylan, Tom Petty, Jethro Tull, Madonna, Radiohead and others.
