= John A. Sabatini =

American politician (1945–2025)

Member of the Rhode Island Senate from the 39th district
- In office 1981–1993

Administrator of the Workers Compensation Court of Rhode Island
- In office 2005–2017
- Governor: Donald Carcieri; Lincoln Chafee; Gina Raimondo

Personal details
- Born: John Angelo Sabatini; September 21, 1945 Pawtucket, Rhode Island, U.S.
- Died: July 5, 2025 (aged 79) Brooksville, Florida, U.S.
- Party: Democratic
- Spouse: Midge Sabatini (m. 1981)
- Children: 1
- Education: Providence College; Catholic University of America Columbus School of Law

John Angelo Sabatini (September 21, 1945 – July 5, 2025) was an American politician. A member of the Democratic Party, he served in the Rhode Island Senate from 1981 to 1993 and as administrator of the Workers Compensation Court of Rhode Island from 2005 to 2017.

== Life and career ==
Sabatini was born in Pawtucket, Rhode Island, the son of Angelo Sabatini and Helen Bobola. He attended Providence College, graduating in 1967. After graduating, he served in the United States Army during the Vietnam War, which after his discharge, he attended the Catholic University of America Columbus School of Law, earning his degree in 1975. After earning his degree, he worked as an attorney.

Sabatini served in the Rhode Island Senate from 1981 to 1993. After his service in the Senate, he served as administrator of the Workers Compensation Court of Rhode Island from 2005 to 2017.

Sabatini died in Brooksville, Florida on July 5, 2025, at the age of 79.
