= Consolidated Contractors Company =

Athens-based Middle East construction company

- Type: Private
- Industry: Oil and gas; heavy civil engineering; air, water, and effluent systems
- Founded: 1952
- Founders: Said Khoury, Hasib Sabbagh
- Headquarters: Athens, Greece
- Products: Construction, engineering
- Revenue: US$2.32 billion (2023)
- Number of employees: 60,000 (2024)
- Website: http://www.ccc.net

Consolidated Contractors Company (CCC) (Arabic: شركة اتحاد المقاولين) is the largest construction company in the Middle East and ranks among the top 25 international contractors with a revenue of US$5.3 billion in 2013 and 1.872 billion by 2020. CCC has offices and projects in over 40 countries, and in 2023 had a workforce of 36,000 employees. In April 2019, CCC was engaged in 40 ongoing projects globally. The majority of its sales (some 80%) are in the Middle East.

Founded in 1952, this privately held company "offers commercial project management, engineering, procurement, and construction services", according to Bloomberg. The company's own publications discuss "construction, engineering, procurement, development and investment activities internationally" in areas from the Middle East to Africa, Australia and Papua New Guinea.

== History ==
In the summer of 1941, after having graduated from American University in Beirut, Hasib Sabbagh, one of the founders of CCC, returned to Israel to find a job. After a number of disappointing job offers, he decided to start his own business and went to Beirut in spring 1948, where a number of his brothers and sisters had already sought refuge due to the Arab–Israeli War. Hasib set up his own company with his brother-in-law Said Khoury and some other businessmen from Syria and Lebanon, and called it Consolidated Contractors Company.

The company's first headquarters was in Homs, Syria, but later moved to Beirut, where Hasib Sabbagh, Said Khoury, and Kamel Abedelrahman, the founders, became the sole owners of CCC to create an Arab construction company. In 1950, CCC won a large contract to build pipelines from Kirkuk in Iraq, to Banyas in Syria, and Tripoli in Lebanon. In 1952, CCC was able to obtain another major contract for a Bechtel-Wimpey joint venture, this time in Aden, to build a major refinery and a camp for workers. A year later, CCC won projects in the United Arab Emirates, Bahrain, and Qatar. In 1973, CCC set up the National Petroleum Construction Company in Abu Dhabi to provide offshore services to the oil and gas industries in all the Arabian Gulf countries. Today NPCC has an annual revenue of over US$800 million

In 1975, when the civil war broke out in Lebanon, CCC moved its headquarters first to London and then to Athens in 1976. In the same year, Abd al-Rahman decided to sell his shares in CCC to Sabbagh and Khoury. In the 1980s, CCC was restructured and the CCC owners aimed at expanding the company's operations into Europe, the United States, and Asia. CCC bought Underwater Engineering, a British firm that worked on underwater oil projects, and ACWa, an environmental company. CCC also bought SICON, an Italian mechanical engineering company specializing in petroleum-related projects. They then acquired the Morganti Group, a construction firm in the United States.

To diversify its projects, CCC started a partnership with Canadian OXY, and won a bid to explore for oil in Masila, South Yemen. Fortunately, oil was found in large quantities. Oil exports from Masila peaked at 170,000 barrels per day.

The Iraqi invasion of Kuwait in August 1990 dealt a heavy blow to CCC's operations in the Persian Gulf region. The company had to move all of its employees out of Kuwait and close down its business operations there. However, by the mid-1990s, CCC emerged again as a thriving company after having navigated successfully the economic and political downturns of the early 1990s growing into the versatile and diversified large international construction company it is today.

In 2019, CCC specializes in

Heavy Civil Construction, Buildings and Civil Engineering Works, Mechanical Engineering Works, Heavy and Light Industrial Plants, Marine Works, Offshore Installations, Highways, roads and airports, and Pipelines for water, gas, oil and slurry.

== Notable projects ==
CCC has a portfolio that includes oil and gas plants, refineries and petrochemical facilities, pipelines, power and desalination plants, light industries, water and sewage treatment plants, airports and seaports, heavy civil works, dams, reservoirs and distribution systems, road networks and skyscrapers.

CCC constructed the Azerbaijani section of The Baku–Tbilisi–Ceyhan pipeline. The pipeline is a 1,768 kilometres (1,099 mi) long crude oil pipeline from the Azeri-Chirag-Guneshli oil field in the Caspian Sea to the Mediterranean Sea. It connects Baku, the capital of Azerbaijan and Ceyhan, a port on the south-eastern Mediterranean coast of Turkey, via Tbilisi, the capital of Georgia. It is the second-longest oil pipeline in the former Soviet Union, after the Druzhba pipeline. CCC's scope included engineering, procurement, installation, construction and commissioning of 886 km crude oil and gas pipeline.

CCC built the $1-billion Presidential Palace in Abu Dhabi. The palace houses the offices of the president, the Crown Prince, and ministers. It is set on a 1,500,000 sq m including the palace, which will be 160,000 sq m. The ancillary buildings, over a site of 23,000 sqm, includes a public majlis, a mosque, staff and military accommodations, a services compound, and various gatehouses and watchtowers. The project also includes 2000m of six-metre seawall and 4 million cubic metres of dredging.

CCC is constructing in a joint venture the Riyadh metro.

A joint venture between CCC and Saipem constructed the main works at the Karachaganak field in western Kazakhstan. The projects' s value was about 1.1 billion dollars. The contract covered civil works, infrastructures and mechanical works related to a production unit and gas reinjection facilities, a gas process plant and a 635 km x 24" pipeline with a pumping station and terminal.

In Abu Dhabi, CCC contributed to the construction of the Offshore Associated Gas Project, and Habshan Facilities, and the largest ethylene cracker in the world. The Landmark project in Abu Dhabi, completed in 2011, was the second highest tower in Abu Dhabi (324 m); and the company also worked on Khalifa Port Shah Sulfur Station & Pipelines.

Elsewhere in the Persian Gulf, CCC has been working on a number of major projects in Qatar, including: Khursaniyah Producing Facilities & Gas Plants in Saudi Arabia’s Eastern Province. The Khalifa Sports Hall, Doha, Qatar. This new sports hall is the world’s largest air-conditioned indoor facility of its kind.

CCC also built the Nile Corniche Project in Cairo: One of the largest construction projects in Egypt and the Ritz Carlton hotel in Doha.

The Bethlehem Convention Palace is a joint investment of CCC and the Palestine Investment Fund. The site includes the three historic Solomon's Pools, Murad Castle (or Burâk Castle) housing the Castle Museum, an amphitheater that can host nearly 1,500 people, the Handicraft Center traditional bazaar and a natural heritage forest. The General Manager of the site is George N Bassous, who is also a Board Vice President at CCC. the Handicraft Center traditional bazaar and a natural heritage forest.

== Major projects ==
CCC has completed the construction of the largest gas to liquids (GTL) project in the World. The Qatargas 3 & 4 LNG Plant, Trains 6 & 7 in Qatar; the largest LNG Trains in the world at 7.82 MTPA. With these two trains completed, CCC is the largest liquified natural gas (LNG) construction contractor worldwide, having 17 LNG Trains with a total capacity of 82 MTPA, equivalent to 30% of all LNG facilities in the world.

The Dubai Mall which was constructed by CCC is the largest shopping center in the world. The project comprised a 515,000 m² mall area, which is about the size of 50 soccer fields, a 550,000 m² car parking area, and a district cooling plant building of 42,000 refrigeration tons. The Mall features 1,200 stores and also boasts the Dubai Aquarium and Underwater Zoo, the Olympic-sized Dubai Ice Rink, children’s "edutainment" concept Kidzania and a massive indoor cinema complex. The Aquarium includes a 270 degree walk through tunnel and the world's largest viewing window. The Dubai Aquarium and Discovery Center clinched the Guinness World Record for the World's Largest Acrylic Panel, measuring 32.88 meters wide × 8.3 m high x 750 mm thick, and weighing 245,614 kg.

Princess Nora bint Abdul Rahman University (site works infrastructure & utility plant) is one of the ten largest universities in the world and is the largest women-only university in the world. It is the first green campus in Saudi Arabia. The 8,000,000 sq m comprises academic buildings, administration buildings, a hospital, research centers, staff and student housing, schools, sports facilities, plant and utility buildings and a 5 km long utility tunnel. The university can accommodate up to 40,000 students and 4,000 employees.

In an April 2019 report, CCC listed these as its landmark construction projects: "the Dubai Mall, the Abu Dhabi International Airport – Midfield Terminal Building, Riyadh Metro Project, 30% of all LNG facilities in the world, residential towers, hotels, power stations, water and sewage treatment plants and networks, roads and bridges, industrial and process plants and pipelines around the world".

== Airport projects ==
The Midfield Terminal of the Abu Dhabi International Airport, a US$3.2 billion project, was awarded to the joint venture of CCC, TAV and Arabtec. The 700,000 m^{2} Midfield Terminal building is one of the largest airport projects ever conceived and will more than double passenger capacity at Abu Dhabi International Airport to 47 million people, in line with passenger projections up until at least 2030.

The Muscat International Airport expansion is a multi-million US dollar project (2009–2014) that will increase the airport's capacity by 12 million passengers per year. The joint venture between CCC and Turkey's TAV was awarded the US$1.3 billion contract to carry out all the civil works. This includes construction of a new airfield (northern runway and all associate taxiways); refurbishment of the existing airfield; all utility works, construction of utility buildings and substations; airside and landside road system including bridges and interchanges; drainage works; and soft and hard landscaping. CCC also constructed the six-lane flyover bridge linking the New Muscat Airport to 18 November Street.

CCC was heavily involved in the construction of the new the Hamad International Airport in Qatar. Across several packages, CCC's scope entailed the air traffic control tower and its support facilities, midfield area access system, midfield telecommunication building, fire stations, administrative building blocks, the medical center and employee village, the general aviation hangar and the solid waste handling facility.

A joint venture between Vinci SA, CCC, TAV & Odebrecht was awarded in 2007 the construction of the US$2 billion new Tripoli International Airport Terminal buildings in Libya. The two terminals will have a total built area of 325,000 sq m and will accommodate up to 20 million passengers annually. The construction was not hold due to the political instabilities in the region but has now resumed. CCC is also building the US$500 billion new passenger terminal at the Sabha Airport in Southern Libya.

A joint venture between Hochtief and CCC built the US$490 million Rafic Hariri International Airport in Beirut, Lebanon between 1994 and 2000.

The Komo Airport and Infrastructure in Papua New Guinea was construction by the McConnell and CCC joint venture. Located 1,600 meters above sea level, the runway is 3.2 kilometres long and 45 metres wide. The airfield is designed to specifically accommodate the Antonov An-124 Ruslan planes. These massive Ukrainian cargo aircraft will bring in large pieces of equipment for the construction of the PNG LNG project's Hides gas field conditioning plant, which is located 10 km away to the northeast of Komo Airfield. The airfield will also be used as a base to fly in workers on Bombardier Dash 8 aircraft to assist future upstream efforts in the wider region.

== Legal complications ==
In March 2008, Ambatovy Minerals S.A., specializing in the extraction and refining of nickel and cobalt, entered into a contract with CCC for the construction of a 220-kilometer pipeline in Madagascar. This project was part of a large-scale industrial initiative aimed at transporting raw ore extracted from the mountains to the coast for refining. From the outset of the contract's execution, problems arose, necessitating successive amendments to the contract. Despite these adjustments, tensions persisted, leading to an arbitration proceeding in 2012 in Toronto, in accordance with the rules of the International Court of Arbitration.

After more than three years of proceedings, in September 2015, the Court rendered a decision in favor of Ambatovy Minerals S.A., awarding it $25 million compared to only $7 million for CCC, resulting in a net compensation of $18 million in favor of Ambatovy Minerals S.A. CCC contested this decision before the Ontario Court of Appeal, but the appeal was dismissed.

1. CCC legal
- This concerns publicly documented English litigation involving Consolidated Contractors Company (CCC), its affiliated companies and certain members of the Khoury and Sabbagh families. It distinguishes allegations made by litigants from findings made by courts.*
  1. Background

Consolidated Contractors Company (CCC) is an international engineering and construction group founded in the Middle East. In *Sabbagh v Khoury & Ors* [2014] EWHC 3233 (Comm), the English High Court described the CCC group as having been founded in Palestine in 1950 by Hassib Sabbagh and Said Toufic Khoury, together with Kamil Abd Al-Rhaman, who withdrew from the business in the 1970s. The group subsequently re-established itself in Lebanon. The judgment explained that Consolidated Contractors Group SAL (CCG) was established in 1984 and thereafter served as the group's ultimate parent company.

CCC's own corporate history gives 1952 as its founding year. The difference between the company's stated date and the date recorded in the 2014 judgment should be preserved when describing the group's origins rather than silently treating the dates as identical.

  - Sources:** *Sabbagh v Khoury* [2014] EWHC 3233 (Comm), paragraphs 20–22; CCC, “Our Story & Legacy”.
  1. Masri litigation
    1. Contract dispute concerning the Masila oil concession

The litigation brought by Munib Masri against companies in the CCC group arose from an agreement concerning revenues from the Masila oil concession in Yemen. Masri claimed that he was entitled to 10% of CCC's 10% share of the concession revenues under a written agreement made in 1992.

The defendants disputed the claim and maintained that the agreement had been terminated in approximately May 1993 because Masri had failed to meet his own payment obligations.

In July 2006, the English Commercial Court found Consolidated Contractors International Company SAL (CCIC) and Consolidated Contractors (Oil and Gas) SAL (CCOG) liable to Masri for breach of contract. The court dismissed Masri's claims against Wael Khoury personally and against Consolidated Contractors UK Ltd and CC Holding. A subsequent judgment in March 2007 assessed the amounts payable. The litigation ultimately involved substantial sums, interest and costs.

The Court of Appeal later summarized the procedural history and the distinction between the companies found liable and the individuals and other companies against whom claims had been dismissed.

  - Sources:** *Masri v Consolidated Contractors International Company SAL* [2006] EWHC 1931 (Comm); *Masri v Consolidated Contractors International Company SAL* [2007] EWHC 468 (Comm); *Masri v Consolidated Contractors International Company SAL* [2008] EWCA Civ 303.
    1. Enforcement proceedings and receivership

Following the judgments, Masri pursued enforcement in England and other jurisdictions. The English proceedings included applications for freezing orders, information concerning company assets, and the appointment of receivers.

The Court of Appeal recorded that receivers were appointed in relation to CCOG and CCIC to collect certain revenues, including revenues connected with the Masila concession and international construction contracts. These proceedings arose because the judgment debt had not been paid and Masri sought to enforce the court's orders.

The enforcement litigation was extensive and involved disputes about the companies' obligations to cooperate with the receivers and provide information.

  - Sources:** *Masri v Consolidated Contractors International Company SAL* [2011] EWCA Civ 21, paragraphs 2–8; *Masri v Consolidated Contractors International Company SAL* [2011] EWCA Civ 898.
    1. Contempt proceedings

In 2010, Masri initiated contempt proceedings against CCIC and CCOG, alleging that the companies had received revenues subject to receivership arrangements, failed to cooperate with the receiver, interfered with the receivership and failed to provide information or documents required by court orders.

The companies disputed the allegations. Their position included arguments concerning legal requirements in jurisdictions outside the United Kingdom and the appointment of judicial administrators by the Lebanese courts.

In 2011, the English Commercial Court made findings of contempt against CCIC and CCOG. The Court of Appeal subsequently considered procedural questions concerning appeals from those findings. The contempt findings concerned the two corporate judgment debtors; they should not be described as findings of personal contempt against every director, shareholder or member of the Khoury family.

In its later 2014 judgment in *Sabbagh v Khoury*, the High Court specifically reviewed the Masri litigation. It explained that the contempt findings had been made against CCIC and CCOG, while the committal proceedings against Wael Khoury had not proceeded to a hearing. The court also recorded that the proceedings were resolved through a global settlement, following which the committal proceedings against Wael were dismissed.

  - Sources:** *Masri v Consolidated Contractors International Company SAL* [2011] EWHC 1024 (Comm); *Masri v Consolidated Contractors International Company SAL* [2011] EWCA Civ 21; *Masri v Consolidated Contractors International Company SAL* [2011] EWCA Civ 898; *Sabbagh v Khoury* [2014] EWHC 3233 (Comm), paragraphs 201 and 208–209.
  1. Sabbagh v Khoury litigation
    1. Background to the family dispute

The litigation known as *Sabbagh v Khoury & Ors* arose from disputes concerning the assets and shareholdings of Hassib Sabbagh, one of CCC's founders, and the interests of his daughter, Sana Sabbagh, and other members of the Sabbagh and Khoury families.

Hassib suffered a serious stroke in 2002 and died in January 2010. The proceedings concerned two principal sets of allegations: alleged misappropriation of assets belonging to Hassib and alleged deprivation of Sana Sabbagh's entitlement to shares in the CCC holding company.

The 2014 judgment described the claims as being brought both in Sana's capacity as an heir of her father and in her own right. The pleaded value of the share-deprivation claim exceeded US$520 million, while the asset-misappropriation claim was estimated at approximately US$75 million. Those figures described the claims advanced in the litigation; they were not awards of damages.

  - Source:** *Sabbagh v Khoury* [2014] EWHC 3233 (Comm), paragraphs 5–8 and 58–59.
    1. Dispute over CCC share ownership

A central issue concerned historical transfers of shares in CCG. The defendants relied on a series of agreements from 1993, 1995 and 1998, which they argued had transferred ownership interests in accordance with the relevant corporate documents and Lebanese law.

The judgment described transactions involving Hassib Sabbagh, his children and other entities connected with the CCC group. It also recorded that Sana had received US$50 million in connection with the 1998 arrangements.

In considering the share-deprivation claim, the High Court concluded that the claim did not have a real prospect of success. The court placed particular weight on the share-transfer agreements and Sana's acceptance, by the time of the hearing, of the existence, validity and effectiveness of the 1993, 1995 and 1998 transactions.

The court therefore distinguished the share-deprivation claim from the separate asset-misappropriation claim.

  - Source:** *Sabbagh v Khoury* [2014] EWHC 3233 (Comm), paragraphs 31–56 and 107–112.
    1. Alleged misappropriation of assets

The second claim concerned money and investments which Sana alleged belonged to her father and had been controlled by CCC-related entities after his stroke.

The allegations included the alleged use of funds for investments in companies, real estate, CCC-related projects and other assets. The judgment discussed a number of alleged transactions and investments, including investments associated with S & K Holding SAL and other companies.

The defendants disputed the allegations. The court considered whether there was a sufficient basis for the asset-misappropriation claim to continue against the relevant defendants.

Unlike the share-deprivation claim, the High Court concluded that the asset-misappropriation claim raised a serious issue to be tried. In particular, the court held that there was an arguable issue concerning whether Wael Khoury knew of, or was complicit in, any improper or unauthorised transactions, if such wrongdoing had occurred.

This was a preliminary assessment of whether the claim could proceed, not a final judgment that the alleged misappropriation had been proved. The court expressly stated that it was not deciding whether the surviving claim was strong or weak.

  - Source:** *Sabbagh v Khoury* [2014] EWHC 3233 (Comm), paragraphs 71–74 and 177–198.
    1. Court's treatment of the Masri litigation

Sana also relied on the earlier Masri litigation in advancing her claims. The defendants disputed the relevance of those proceedings.

The High Court considered the history and concluded that the Masri litigation did not establish personal wrongdoing by Wael Khoury. The court noted that the substantive Masri claims had been against companies, that Wael was not a party to the substantive contractual claims, and that no findings of personal wrongdoing had been made against him in that litigation.

The court therefore declined to draw an adverse inference against Wael from the Masri proceedings when assessing Sana's claims.

  - Source:** *Sabbagh v Khoury* [2014] EWHC 3233 (Comm), paragraphs 199–209.
  1. Subsequent proceedings and appeals

The Sabbagh litigation continued through further proceedings concerning jurisdiction, arbitration and the relationship between the English proceedings and arbitration proceedings.

In *Sabbagh v Khoury* [2019] EWCA Civ 1219, the Court of Appeal considered an appeal concerning an injunction restraining the continuation of arbitration proceedings. The dispute included whether the arbitration claims duplicated matters already being litigated in England and whether continuation of the arbitration would be vexatious or oppressive.

The Court of Appeal's judgment described the family and corporate background, including the relationship between the Sabbagh and Khoury families and the structure of the CCC group.

The subsequent proceedings should be read together with the 2014 judgment. The 2014 judgment's distinction between the share-deprivation claim and the asset-misappropriation claim remains important when describing what the court actually decided at that stage.

  - Source:** *Sabbagh v Khoury* [2019] EWCA Civ 1219.
  1. Distinction between allegations and judicial findings

The cases involving CCC and related parties contain different categories of legal outcomes:

- **Contractual liability:** CCIC and CCOG were found liable to Munib Masri for breach of contract in the Masri litigation. - **Corporate contempt:** Contempt findings were made against CCIC and CCOG in the enforcement proceedings. - **Personal liability:** The 2014 Sabbagh judgment expressly stated that no findings of personal wrongdoing had been made against Wael Khoury in the Masri litigation. - **Share-deprivation claim:** The High Court concluded in 2014 that Sana Sabbagh's share-deprivation claim did not have a real prospect of success. - **Asset-misappropriation claim:** The High Court held that the separate claim raised a serious issue to be tried. That preliminary conclusion was not a final determination that the alleged misappropriation had occurred.

These distinctions are essential to an accurate account of the litigation.

  1. References

1. *Sabbagh v Khoury & Ors* [2014] EWHC 3233 (Comm), 10 October 2014. [Judgment on BAILII](https://www.bailii.org/ew/cases/EWHC/Comm/2014/3233.html). 2. *Sabbagh v Khoury & Ors* [2019] EWCA Civ 1219, 12 July 2019. [Judgment on BAILII](https://www.bailii.org/ew/cases/EWCA/Civ/2019/1219.html). 3. *Masri v Consolidated Contractors International Company SAL & Anor* [2008] EWCA Civ 303, 4 April 2008. [Judgment on BAILII](https://www.bailii.org/ew/cases/EWCA/Civ/2008/303.html). 4. *Masri v Consolidated Contractors International Company SAL & Ors* [2011] EWCA Civ 21. [Judgment on BAILII](https://www.bailii.org/ew/cases/EWCA/Civ/2011/21.html). 5. *Masri v Consolidated Contractors International Company SAL & Ors* [2011] EWCA Civ 898, 27 July 2011. [Judgment on BAILII](https://www.bailii.org/ew/cases/EWCA/Civ/2011/898.html). 6. Consolidated Contractors Company, “Our Story & Legacy”. [Company history](https://www.ccc.net/who-we-are/story-legacy/).
