= Armando O. Bonilla =

American judge (born 1967)

Armando Bonilla
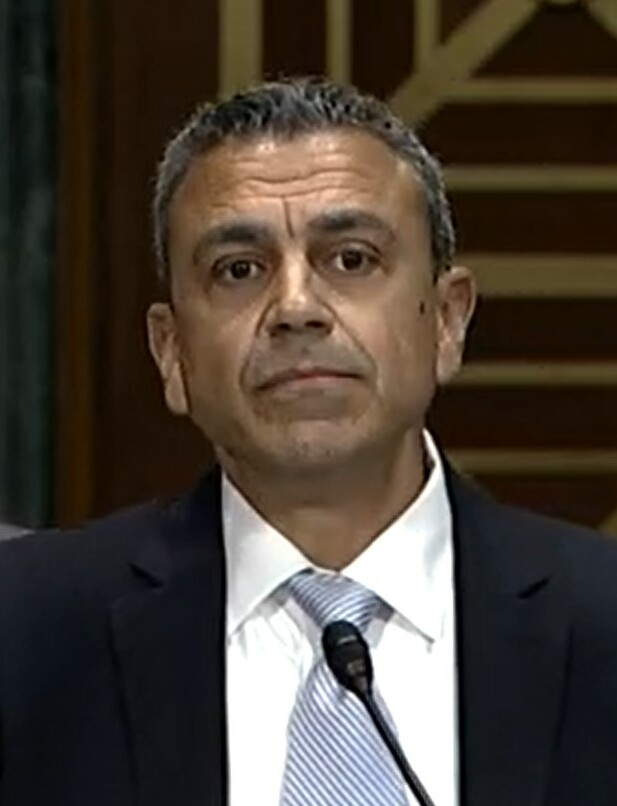

Judge of the United States Court of Federal Claims
- Incumbent
- Assumed office February 17, 2022
- Appointed by: Joe Biden
- Preceded by: Edward J. Damich

Personal details
- Born: Armando Omar Bonilla; 1967 (age 57–58); New York City, New York, U.S.
- Education: West Virginia University (BA); Seton Hall University (JD)

Armando Omar Bonilla (born 1967) is an American attorney who is a judge of the United States Court of Federal Claims. Prior to this, Bonilla served as an associate deputy attorney general in the United States Department of Justice.

== Education ==
Bonilla was born to a mother from Cuba and a Cuban-American father. Bonilla received a Bachelor of Arts degree in 1989 from West Virginia University. He received a Juris Doctor, magna cum laude, in 1992 from Seton Hall University School of Law.

== Career ==
He began his legal career as a law clerk for Judge Garrett Brown Jr. of the United States District Court for the District of New Jersey from 1992 to 1994. He has served in numerous roles in the United States Department of Justice, starting as a trial and appellate attorney in the Civil Division's commercial litigation branch from 1994 to 2001. From 2001 to 2002, he served as a prosecutor in the asset forfeiture and money laundering section of the Criminal Division and from 2002 to 2010, he served as a prosecutor in the public integrity section of the criminal division. From 2010 to 2017, he served as an associate deputy attorney general. From 2017 to 2018, he served as associate general counsel for the United States Marshals Service. From 2018 to 2022, he was the vice president of ethics and investigations at Capital One.

== Claims court service ==
=== Expired nomination to claims court under Obama ===
On May 21, 2014, President Barack Obama nominated Bonilla to serve as a Judge of the United States Court of Federal Claims, to the seat vacated by Judge Edward J. Damich, who assumed senior status on October 21, 2013. On July 24, 2014 a hearing before the United States Senate Committee on the Judiciary was held on his nomination. On September 18, 2014, his nomination was reported out of committee by a voice vote.

On December 16, 2014, his nomination was returned to the President due to the sine die adjournment of the 113th Congress. On January 7, 2015, President Obama renominated him to the same position.

On February 26, 2015, his nomination was reported out of committee by a voice vote. His nomination expired on January 3, 2017, with the end of the 114th Congress.

=== Renomination to claims court under Biden ===
On June 30, 2021, President Joe Biden announced his intent to nominate Bonilla to serve as a judge of the United States Court of Federal Claims. On July 13, 2021, his nomination was sent to the Senate. President Biden nominated Bonilla to the same seat. A hearing on his nomination before the Senate Judiciary Committee was scheduled for August 11, 2021, but was postponed. On October 5, 2021, his nomination was withdrawn and resubmitted to include updated residency information. On October 6, 2021, a hearing on his nomination was held before the Senate Judiciary Committee. On October 28, 2021, his nomination was reported out of committee by a voice vote, with Senators Josh Hawley and Marsha Blackburn voting "nay" on record. On December 18, 2021, the United States Senate confirmed Bonilla's nomination by voice vote. He received his judicial commission on February 17, 2022. He took the oath of office on February 18, 2022.

== See also ==
- List of Hispanic and Latino American jurists

Legal offices
Preceded by Edward J. Damich	Judge of the United States Court of Federal Claims; 2022–present	Incumbent
