= James F. Merow =

American judge (1932–2016)

James Merow

Senior Judge of the United States Court of Federal Claims
- In office August 4, 1998 – December 23, 2016

Judge of the United States Court of Federal Claims
- In office August 5, 1983 – August 4, 1998
- Appointed by: Ronald Reagan
- Preceded by: Seat established
- Succeeded by: Edward J. Damich

Personal details
- Born: March 16, 1932; Salamanca, New York, U.S.
- Died: December 23, 2016 (aged 84)
- Political party: Republican
- Education: George Washington University (AA, BA, JD)

James F. Merow (March 16, 1932 – December 23, 2016) was a senior judge of the United States Court of Federal Claims. He served as a judge (trial commissioner) of the United States Court of Claims from 1978 to 1982, as an active judge on its successor, the CFC, from 1982 to 1998, and then as a senior judge until the time of his death.

Born in Salamanca, New York, Merow received an Associate of Arts and a Bachelor of Arts from the George Washington University in 1953, where he was made a member of Phi Beta Kappa and Omicron Delta Kappa. He received a Juris Doctor from the George Washington University Law School in 1956, where he served on the Board of Editors of the Law Review and was made a member of the Order of the Coif. He was an officer in the United States Army Judge Advocate General's Corps from 1956 to 1959, and a trial attorney in the Civil Division of the U.S. Department of Justice, from 1959 to 1978. He became a trial judge of the U.S. Court of Claims in 1978, and on October 1, 1982, became a judge of the CFC by operation of law, holding a new seat authorized by 96 Stat. 27. On June 20, 1983, President Ronald Reagan nominated Merow for reappointment to the CFC. He was confirmed by the United States Senate on August 4, 1983, and received his commission on August 5, 1983. Merow assumed senior status on August 5, 1998.
