= Palestine Investment Conference =

The Palestine Investment Conference (PIC) is aimed at strengthening the economy of Palestine and supporting a future Palestinian state. It took place in the Convention Palace Bethlehem in 2008 and 2010. The conference was hosted in 2008 by Palestinian prime minister Salam Fayyad and in 2010 by Palestinian president Mahmoud Abbas. It was attended by the official envoy of the Quartet on the Middle East, Tony Blair. In 2010, the U.S. delegation was led by the Special Envoy for Middle East Peace George J. Mitchell.

The 2008 conference was focused on large development initiatives. One outcome is the planned city of Rawabi. The 2010 conference focused on small and medium enterprises.

== See also ==
- Foreign relations of the State of Palestine
- International Conference on Supporting Palestine Intifada
