= Solomon's Pools =

Ancient reservoirs near Bethlehem

Coordinates: 31°41′22.5″N 35°10′03.1″E

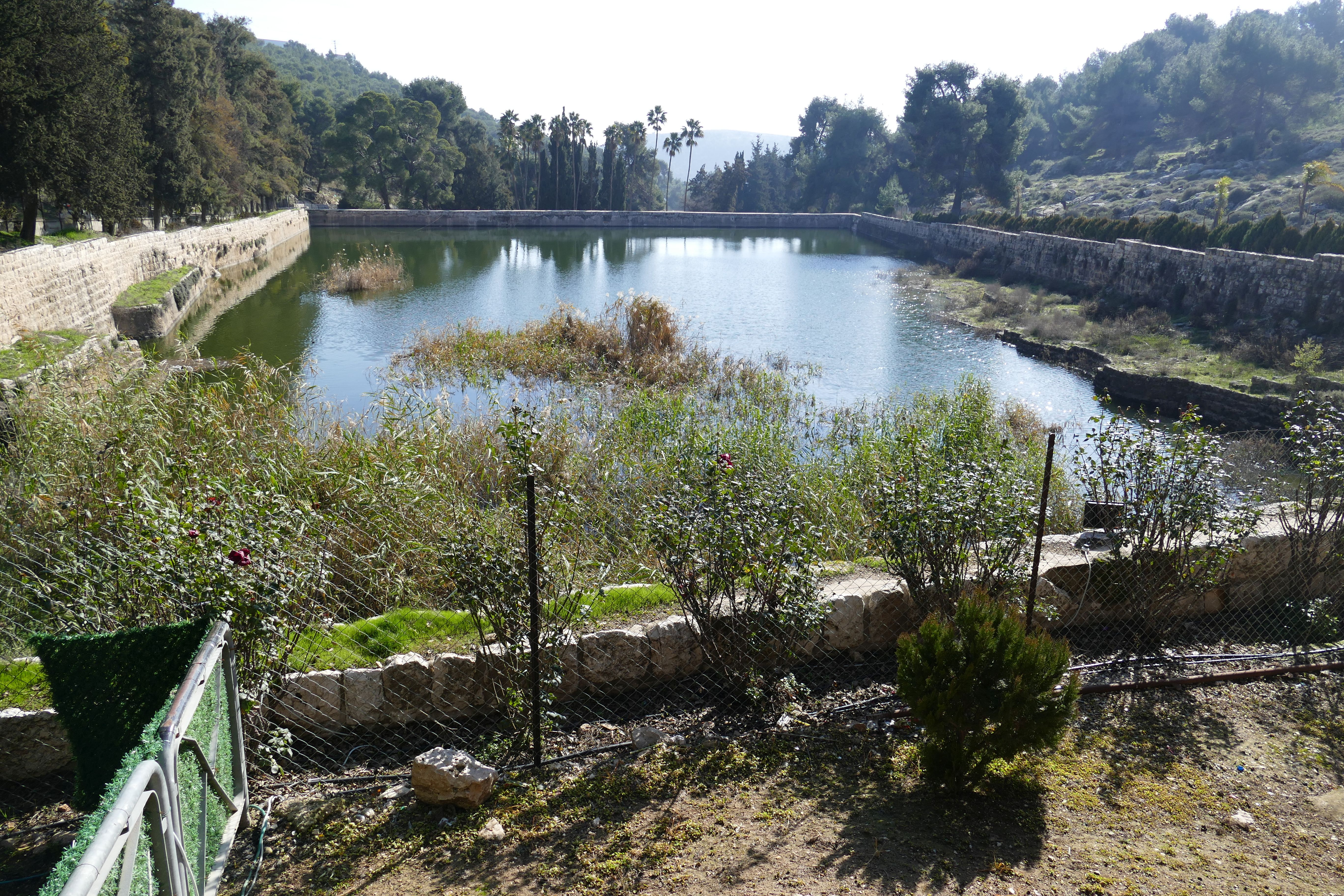
- Interactive map of Solomon's Pools
- Location: Bethlehem, Palestine
- Type: Reservoir
- Managing agency: Palestinian Authority

Solomon's Pools (Arabic: برك سليمان, romanized: Burak Sulaymān, or in short el-Burak, 'the pools'; Hebrew: בריכות שלמה, romanized: Breichot Shlomo) are three ancient reservoirs located in the south-central West Bank, immediately to the south of al-Khader, about 3.5 kilometres (2.2 mi) southwest of Bethlehem, near the road to Hebron. The pools are located in Area A of the West Bank under the control of the Palestinian National Authority.

Solomon's Pools provided the water for two aqueducts that delivered water to Jerusalem during the late Second Temple period. The first one, known as the "Low-level Aqueduct," is thought to have been built in the first century BCE, around the end of the Hasmonean period. It delivered water to cisterns located underground beneath the Temple Mount, which were primarily used by the Temple. A second aqueduct, the "High-Level Aqueduct," took a similar path, but it is uncertain where it ended up in Jerusalem. It might have provided water to Herod's Palace. The Herodium also received water from the Solomon's Pools.

== Name ==
Although the pools are named and traditionally associated with King Solomon, scholars today believe the pools to be much younger, with the oldest part dating to the 2nd century BCE. The masonry of one pool and a recently discovered aqueduct have been dated to the early Roman period.

The pools are named and traditionally associated with King Solomon and linked to the passage in the Book of Ecclesiastes 2.6: "I made myself pools from which to water the forest of growing trees." Josephus wrote that Solomon enjoyed the beauty of the water-rich "Etham" (one of the main springs is called Ein Eitam = Hebrew: עין עיטם). The pools are in close proximity to the ancient town of ʻEiṭam (now Khirbet al-Khuaḥ) and the spring known as ʻAin ʻEiṭam. Legend has it that the king built the pools for his many wives, so that they could bathe in their waters.

According to Josephus, he would pass this place when riding in his chariot. French explorer Victor Guérin who visited the site in the late 19th-century described the source of the pools and their surrounding villages in Description de la Palestine.

== Description ==
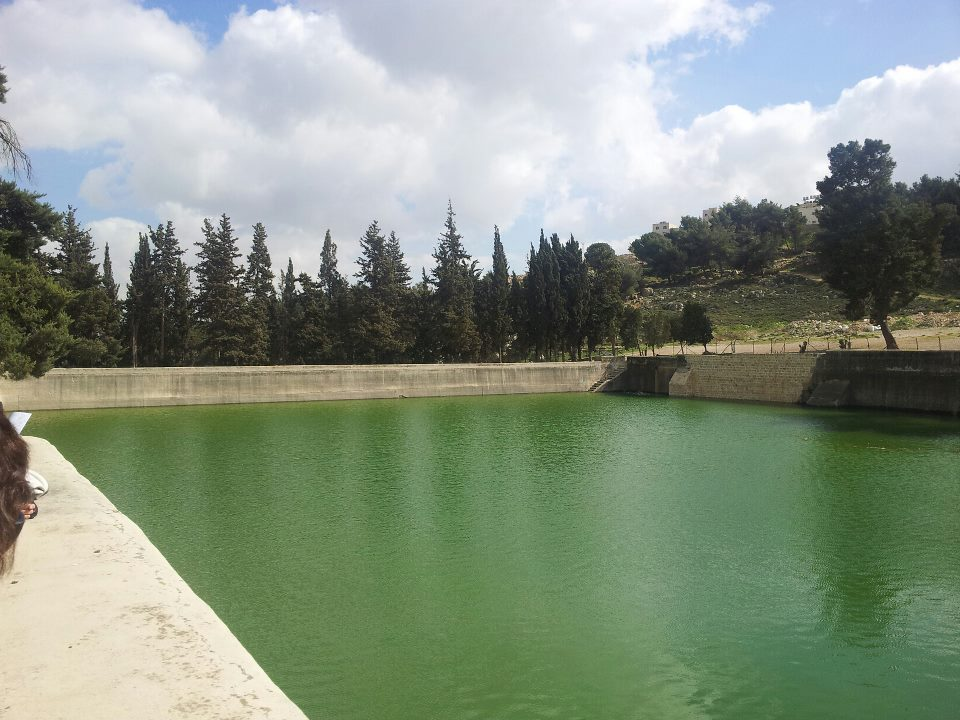
Upper pool, 2013

=== Pools and aqueducts ===
Solomon's Pools, consisting of three large reservoirs, are situated several dozen meters apart, each pool with a roughly 6 metres (20 ft) drop to the next. They are rectangular or trapezoidal in shape, partly hewn into the bedrock and partly built, between 118 and 179 metres (387–587 ft) long and 8 to 23 metres (26–75 ft) deep, with a total capacity of well over a quarter of a million cubic metres (some 290,000 m^{3} or 75 million US gallons). (Note: The dimensions are derived from Mazar 2002; a detailed survey in 2018 established that the Lower Pool is 23 metres (75 ft) deep rather than 16 metres (52 ft). Adams, Letteney & Peers 2019, p. 18)

The complex of reservoirs and water conduits might have been built by Herod the Great or an earlier Hasmonean ruler. The original rectangular excavations may have been stone quarries. The pools were fed by two aqueducts bringing water to the pools from the hills to the south; by several springs of the surrounding countryside including one situated underneath the lower pool; as well as by rainwater that descended from the hills. The pools served as a storage and distribution facility. The collected water was distributed by three other aqueducts: two leading from the pools northwards to Jerusalem, and the third heading eastwards to the Herodium. Traces of all five aqueducts have been found.

The pools are positioned so that the water from the high pool can flow into the lower pool next to it when the water is pumped from it. By way of an aqueduct, the water first flowed to Bethlehem, passed through an underground channel, and finally reached the Temple Mount area of Jerusalem. From the pools to Bethlehem, the average drop is about 35 cm for every 270 meters, but from Bethlehem to Jerusalem it only averages 35 cm for every 1,700 meters. The length of the extant aqueduct is about 2,350 meters and the slope's gradient is about 11 meters, which means a drop of less than 85 cm for every 1,600 meters.

In olden times, this aqueduct, commonly called the "Lower Aqueduct," crossed the Valley of Hinnom slightly above the Sultan's Pool and passed through a number of pointed arches protruding slightly above the ground. Afterwards, the aqueduct continued to meander on the southern slope of Mount Zion and entered the city near the present Jewish Quarter of the Old City. It then ran along the eastern side of that hill, and was supported in part by stonework, while in other parts passed through a conduit carved from the rock, until it suddenly turned east, passed along the embankment and what is now known as Wilson's Arch, whence it entered the Temple Mount courtyard at the Chain Gate.

Today, below the middle pool are the remains of the British pump station that took the water by pipe to the Old City of Jerusalem. Another, more recent pumping station below the lower pool is still providing water to the town of Bethlehem.

=== Turkish fort; museum ===
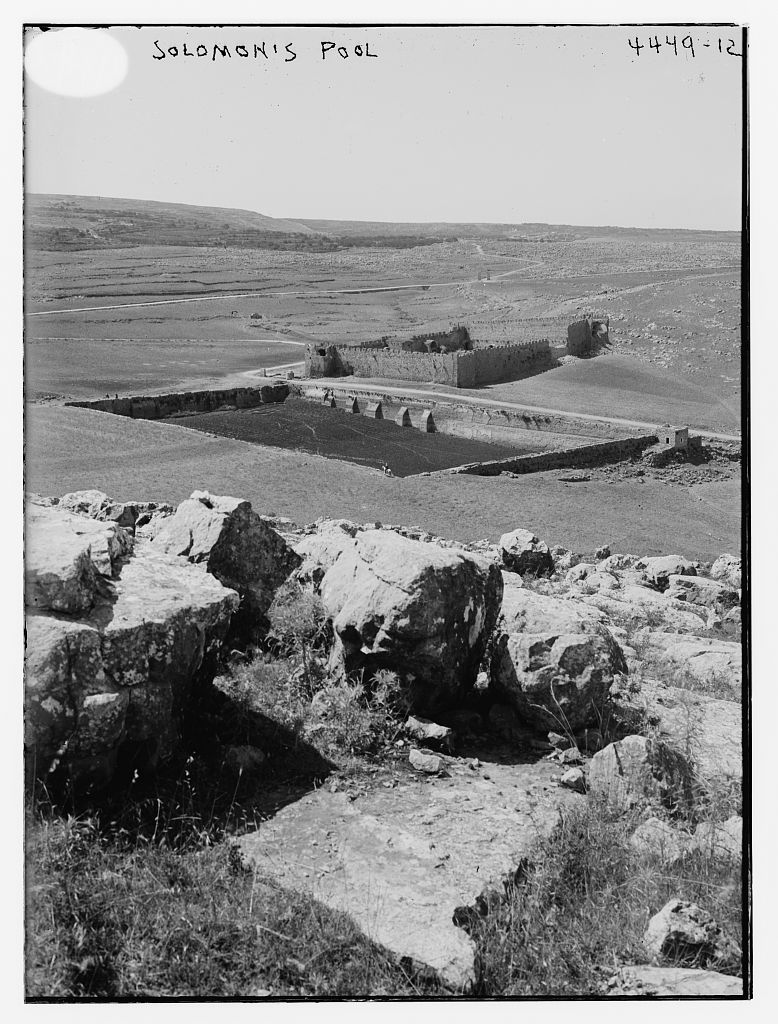
Qalʿat al-Burak was built in the 17th century just north of the upper pool.

Near the Upper Pool stands a small Turkish fort known as Qal'at el-Burak, 'Castle of the Pools', or Qal'at Murad, 'castle of [Sultan] Murad', known in English as Murad or Burak Castle. The rectangular structure with four square corner towers was built by the Ottoman sultan Osman II in 1618. It served as barracks for the Turkish soldiers guarding the Pools of Solomon and the commercial caravans between Jerusalem and Hebron, as well as a staging post on the local hajj route to Mecca. For a long time it was also used as a caravanserai or khan. After being allowed to decay since the middle of the 19th century, the ruined fortress has been largely rebuilt and developed as part of a new tourist complex.

The Castle Museum houses one of the largest ethnographic collections of Palestinian history and culture.

== History ==
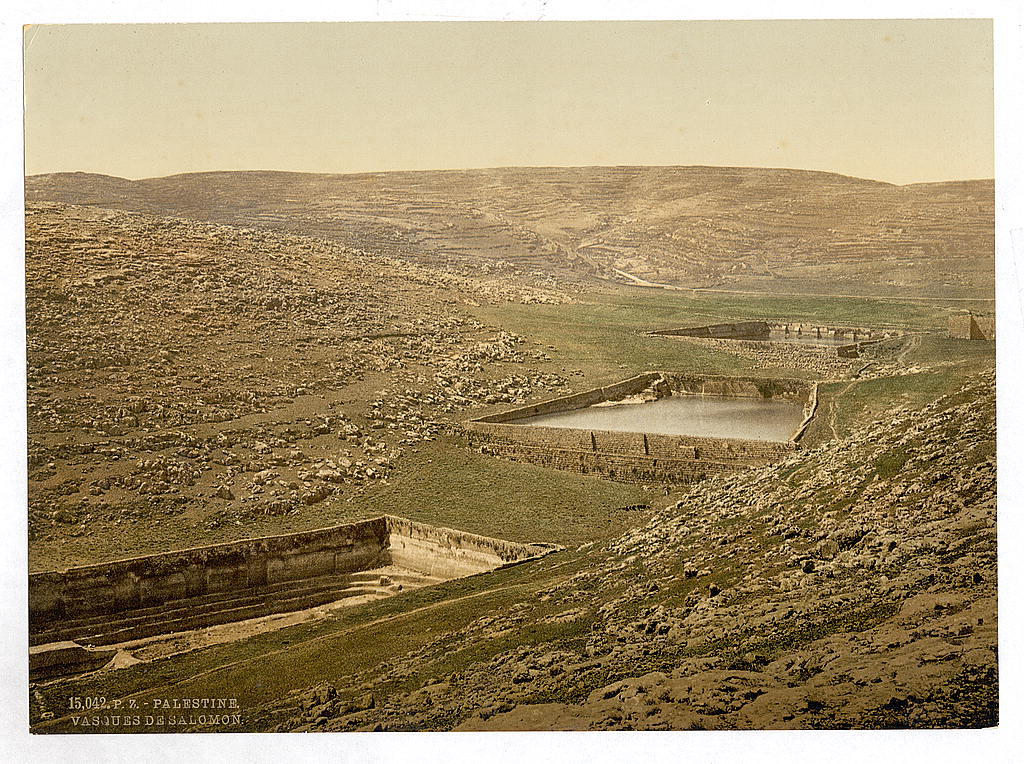
Solomon's pools, between 1890 and 1905

=== Background ===
The water system gradually created consisted of two aqueducts feeding the pools, which themselves acted as a collection and distribution facility, and of three further aqueducts: two carrying the water north to Jerusalem, and a third one to Herodium. Together, the five aqueducts totalled some 80 kilometres in length.

=== Upper pools ===
The construction date of the upper (westernmost) two pools is uncertain but was probably started during the Hasmonean period, between mid-second and mid-first century BC and completed by Herod the Great in connection with his rebuilding program of the Second Temple.

=== Low-Level Aqueduct ===
The Low-Level Aqueduct is thought to have been built in the first century BCE, around the end of the Hasmonean period. The aqueduct began at the lower pool and, after traveling to Jerusalem, climbed a bridge over the Tyropoeon Valley to reach the Temple Mount platform, where it ended inside the cisterns hidden underneath its surface. Water delivered by this aqueduct were primarily used by the Second Temple.

On the surface of the aqueduct, archeologists discovered two prutah coins - one was minted by Alexander Jannaeus and the other one by Herod - along with a fragment of a roof tile bearing a stamped impression of Legio X Fretensis.

=== High-Level Aqueduct ===
The High Level Aqueduct, or upper aqueduct, originated in the upper pool and followed a similar route to the Low Level Aqueduct. However, its precise destination in Jerusalem is unknown. Scholars speculate that it might have supplied water to Herod's Palace, which according to ancient sources, was particularly well-known for its water fountains.

=== Wadi el-Byiar Aqueduct ===
Herod created the sophisticated Wadi el-Byiar Aqueduct, which fed the upper pool. The aqueduct was partially built as a tunnel which collected underground water from the aquifer it was passing through, in the way of a qanat, to supplement the spring water and surface runoff it was also carrying.

=== Pilate's Arrub Aqueduct ===
In a third phase, Roman prefect Pontius Pilate built 39 kilometres (24 mi) of aqueduct bringing yet more water to Solomon's Pools from the large collection pools at Arrub to the south. This aqueduct, which brought water to Jerusalem, was paid for by Pontius Pilate at the expense of the Temple treasury, which act in itself incited the anger of the local people. The aqueduct was destroyed during the First Jewish-Roman War.

=== Mamluk lower pool ===
The lower of the three pools was built in 1483 CE during the reign of Mamluk Sultan Qaytbay. Between 1480 and 1484 Felix Fabri visited, and noted that beside the middle pool there were: "pavilions and tents, wherein dwelt the architects, clerks of the works, overseers, and masters, who there arranged how the watercourses should be dug through the mountains. Round about these pavilions many Moors and Saracens were running to and fro..."

=== Later history ===
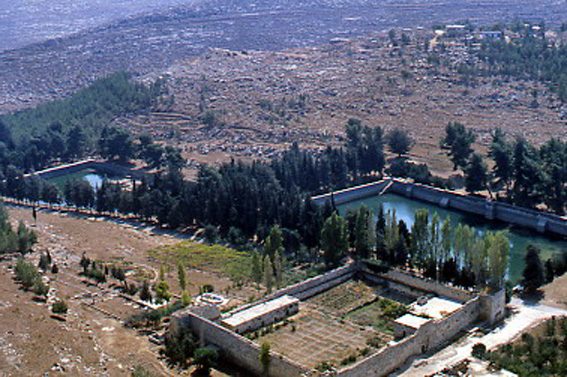
Solomon's pools, 1981

The water system based on Solomon's Pools has provided water to Jerusalem, on and off, for two millennia, all until 1967.

Major repairs to the water system were done by the 10th Roman Legion, Legio Fretensis during the second century CE, later by the Mamluks, the Ottomans and the British. In 1902 for instance, a new 16 km pipeline to Jerusalem was inaugurated to mark the 60th birthday of the Ottoman sultan Abdul Hamid II.

== Springs feeding the pools ==
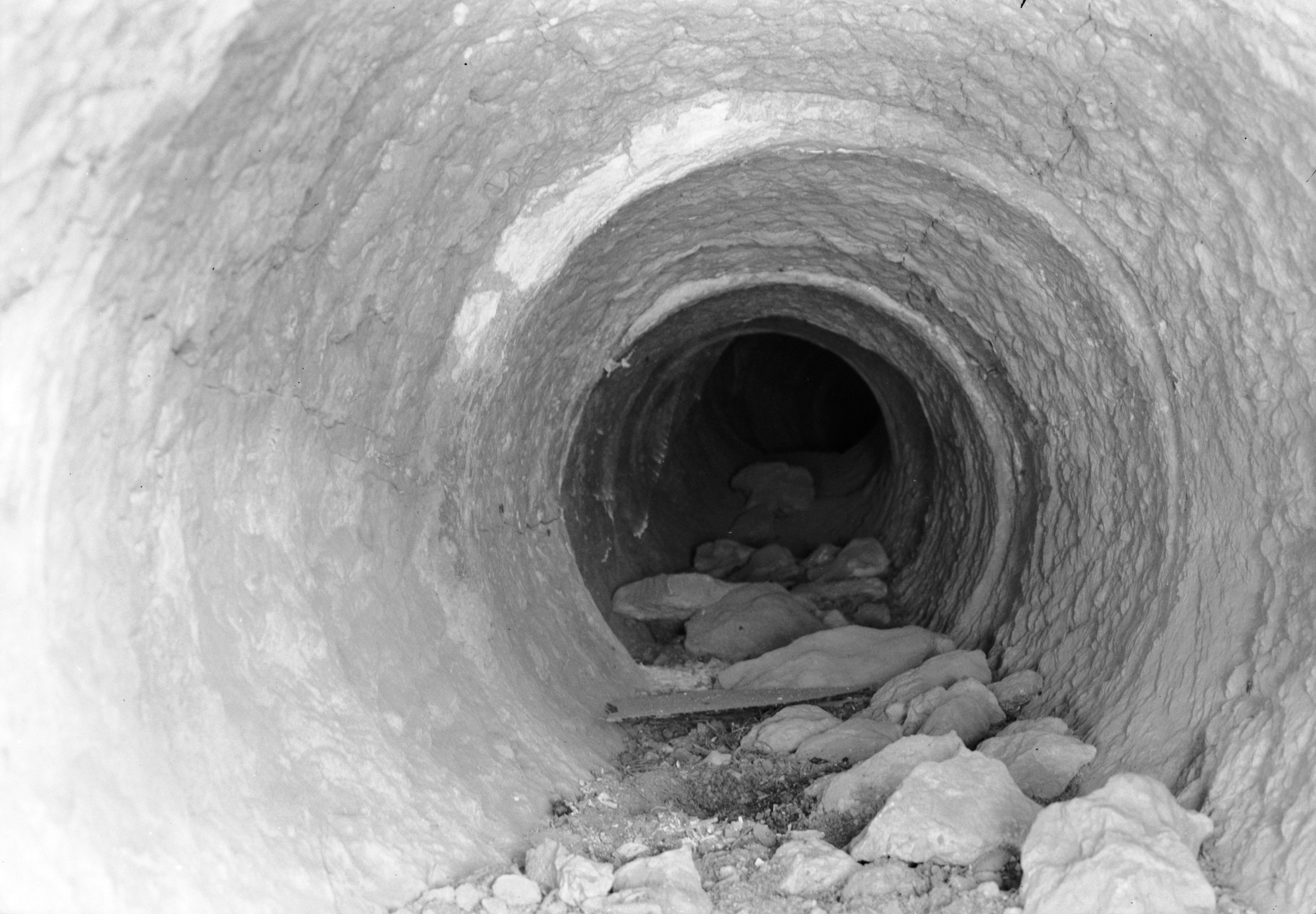
View from inside a Roman aqueduct from the Pools of Solomon to Jerusalem

The pools are directly fed by four different springs: the most prominent is 'Ain Saleh, at the head of the Wadi Urtas (Artas), about 200 metres (660 ft) to the north-west of the upper pool. The spring water is transferred to the upper pool by a large subterranean passage. From the same direction comes the water of 'Ain Burak. 'Ain Attan or Ein Eitam is located south-east of the lower pool, while 'Ain Farujeh is right underneath that pool.

== Present day ==
Today the water from the pools only reaches as far Bethlehem. The aqueduct beyond this was destroyed once taken out of use in 1967.

In recent decades, the pools have suffered from neglect. Between 1967 and the 1990s, the Nassar quarry, the Arja textile industry, and other nearby enterprises freely drew water from the pools. Six people have drowned in the pools since 1993, and no one has been held accountable. In 2009, the pools still lacked any safety precautions, guards on duty, a fence, or warning signs preventing children from jumping in. As a result, complaints were filed against the ministry of Awqaf, the site's owner, and the Solomon's Pools Tourism Agency, the operating company. A Palestinian court was then consulted on the matter.

Solomon's Pools have been managed since 2009 by the Convention Palace Company, which also operates Bethlehem Convention Center along with other sites in the area. The Murad Castle, an Ottoman fort at the park's northern gate, has been transformed into a tourist attraction that also includes an ethnographic and history museum and a restaurant with a garden area. Plans for the larger complex include a conference center, recreational spaces and a mosque.

In 2016, it was reported that a wall of one pool had collapsed. In 2017, the U.S. Consulate in Jerusalem funded a $750,000 restoration project at Solomon's Pools, which were suffering from neglect. In 2026, Bezalel Smotrich, Israel's Minister of Finance, advocated taking control of Solomon's Pools. In response the non-governmental organisation Emek Shaveh, which specialises in archaeology said "This site is being weaponised in order to erode and basically cancel the Oslo agreement". Later that year, the pools were part of the "Jerusalem water system: Qanat es-Sabeel" added to Palestine's tentative list of World Heritage Sites.

== See also ==
History

- Herodian architecture
- Historical water reservoirs in Jerusalem
  - Birket Israel
  - Hezekiah's Pool
  - Mamilla Pool
  - Sultan's Pool
- "Molten sea", bronze-cast water basin at Solomon's Temple

Recent

- Bethlehem Convention Palace (built in the early 2000s), near the Pools and run by the same company

== Bibliography ==
- Adams, Matthew J.; Letteney, Mark; Peers, Max T. B. (2019). "Survey and excavations at Solomon's Pools, Palestine: 2018 preliminary report". Palestine Exploration Quarterly. 151: 15–35. doi:10.1080/00310328.2019.1579454.
- Biblical Encyclopaedia (1950-1988). Bialik Institute: Jerusalem OCLC 741065210
- Bromiley, G.W. (1995). The International Standard Bible Encyclopedia. E-J Wm. B. Eerdmans Publishing. ISBN 0-8028-3782-4.
- Buhl, D.F. (1896). Geographie des alten Palästina. Leipzig: J.C.B. Mohr (Paul Siebeck).
- Büssow, J. (2011). Hamidian Palestine: Politics and Society in the District of Jerusalem 1872-1908. BRILL. ISBN 978-9004205697.
- Schick, C. (1878). "Die Wasserversorgung der Stadt Jerusalem". Zeitschrift des Deutschen Palästina-Vereins. 1: 132–176.
- Fabri, F. (1893). Felix Fabri (circa 1480–1483 A.D.) vol II, part I. Palestine Pilgrims' Text Society.
- Flavius, Josephus. Antiquities
- Guérin, V. (1869). Description Géographique Historique et Archéologique de la Palestine (in French). Vol. 1: Judee, pt. 3. Paris: L'Imprimerie Nationale.
- Mazar, A. (1972). "The Ancient Aqueducts of Jerusalem". Qadmoniot: A Journal for the Antiquities of Eretz-Israel and Bible Lands. 5 (3/4 (19/20)): 120–124. JSTOR 23670359. (Hebrew)
- Mazar, A. (2002), "Survey of the Aqueducts to Jerusalem", in Amit, David; Patrich, Joseph; Hirschfeld, Yizhar (eds.), The Aqueducts of Israel, Journal of Roman Archaeology Supplementary Series, pp. 210–42
- Murphy-O'Connor, J. (2008). The Holy Land: An Oxford Archaeological Guide from Earliest Times to 1700. Oxford University Press US. ISBN 978-0-19-923666-4.
- Shomali, Q.; Shomali, Sawsan. A Guide to Bethlehem and its Surroundings. Waldbrol: Flamm Druck, Wagener GMBH.
