= David Redl =

American lawyer and government official (born 1981)

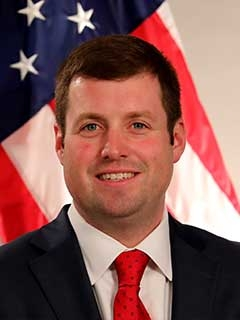

Assistant Secretary of Commerce for Communications and Information; Administrator of the National Telecommunications and Information Administration
- In office November 21, 2017 – May 9, 2019
- President: Donald Trump
- Preceded by: Lawrence E. Strickling
- Succeeded by: Alan B. Davidson

Personal details
- Born: David John Redl; February 1, 1981 (age 45) Rhinebeck, New York
- Education: Pennsylvania State University; Catholic University School of Law

David John Redl (born February 1, 1981) is an American lawyer and government official who was serving as the Assistant Secretary for Communications and Information at the United States Department of Commerce. Prior to assuming this role, he was the chief counsel at the United States House Committee on Energy and Commerce.

Redl previously served as director of regulatory affairs at CTIA, the largest wireless industry trade group in the United States. In 2017, The Hill included Redl on its list of "16 people to watch in tech".
