= Edward J. Damich =

American judge (born 1948)

Edward Damich
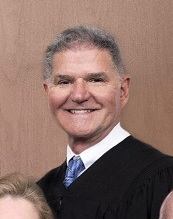
- Damich in 2022

Senior Judge of the United States Court of Federal Claims
- Incumbent
- Assumed office October 22, 2013

Chief Judge of the United States Court of Federal Claims
- In office 2002–2009
- Appointed by: George W. Bush
- Preceded by: Lawrence Baskir
- Succeeded by: Emily C. Hewitt

Judge of the United States Court of Federal Claims
- In office October 22, 1998 – October 22, 2013
- Appointed by: Bill Clinton
- Preceded by: James F. Merow
- Succeeded by: Armando O. Bonilla

Personal details
- Born: Edward John Damich; 1948 (age 77–78) Pittsburgh, Pennsylvania, U.S.
- Education: St. Stephen's College (BA); Catholic University (JD); Columbia University (LLM, JSD)

Edward John Damich (born 1948) is an American lawyer serving as a senior judge of the United States Court of Federal Claims. He served as the court's chief judge from 2002 to 2009.

== Early life, education, and career ==
Born in Pittsburgh, Pennsylvania, in a family of Croatian immigrants, Damich received a Bachelor of Arts degree from St. Stephen's College, Dover, Massachusetts in 1970, and a Juris Doctor degree from Catholic University of America in 1976.

== Career ==
=== Academics ===
He was a professor of law in the Delaware School of Law at Widener University from 1976 to 1984, also serving as a Law and Economics fellow at Columbia University, from which he received a Master of Laws in 1983 and a Doctor of Juridical Science degree in 1991. From 1984 to 1988, he was a professor of law at George Mason University.

=== Early government service ===
In September 1992, Damich was appointed by President George H. W. Bush to be a commissioner of the Copyright Royalty Tribunal, serving as a commissioner until November 1993. From 1995 to 1998 Damich served as chief intellectual property counsel for the Senate Judiciary Committee. During his tenure on the committee, he assisted the chairman, Senator Orrin Hatch, with the passage of the Digital Millennium Copyright Act and the Omnibus Patent Act, the basis for the 1999 American Inventors Protection Act. He was also a member of the U.S. delegation at the World Intellectual Property Organization (WIPO) diplomatic conference, which concluded the WIPO Copyright Treaty and the WIPO Performances and Phonograms Treaty.

=== Claims court service ===
Damich was appointed a judge of the United States Court of Federal Claims on October 22, 1998, by President Bill Clinton. On May 13, 2002, Damich was appointed Chief Judge by President George W. Bush, serving in that capacity until 2009. He assumed senior status on October 22, 2013.

=== Other work ===
Damich is also a distinguished visiting professor of intellectual property at the Columbus School of Law of Catholic University and an adjunct professor of law at George Washington University. He has also been an adjunct professor of law at the Georgetown University Law Center.

Damich is the author of numerous articles, mostly on copyright law, but also on jurisprudence, land use planning, and criminal law. His copyright law articles have been cited in three federal district court opinions, most notably in Wojnarowicz v. American Family Assn., in which the court adopted his interpretation of a New York statute. His articles are cited in all the major casebooks in copyright law and in the leading treatise, Nimmer on Copyright.

He has testified before congressional committees on five occasions on copyright issues and on U.S. foreign policy regarding the former Yugoslavia. Damich is admitted to the Bars of the Supreme Court of the United States, the Federal Circuit, and the District of Columbia. He is a member of the District of Columbia Bar Association, the Bar Association of the District of Columbia, and the Association Litteraire et Artistique Internationale. Damich was the first president of the National Federation of Croatian Americans. On May 8, 2009, Damich received the Loren A. Smith Award, the highest award the court bestows for service on its behalf.

Legal offices
Preceded by James F. Merow	Judge of the United States Court of Federal Claims; 1998–2013	Succeeded by Armando O. Bonilla
Preceded by Lawrence Baskir	Chief Judge of the United States Court of Federal Claims; 2002–2009	Succeeded by Emily C. Hewitt
