= Said Khoury =

Palestinian businessman (1923–2014)

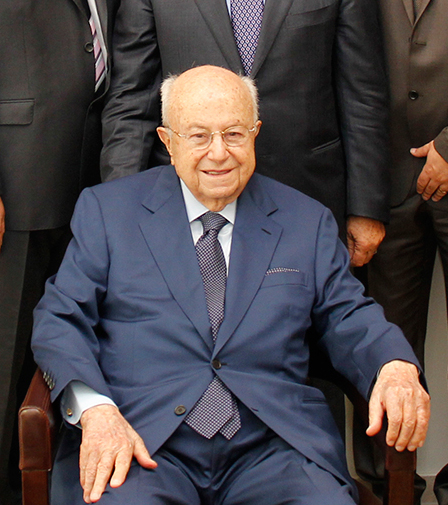
- Born: June 6, 1923; Safad, Mandatory Palestine
- Died: October 15, 2014 (aged 91); Athens, Greece
- Citizenship: Lebanon
- Occupations: Co-founder, owner and Chairman of Consolidated Contractors Company
- Years active: 1941–2014
- Website: www.ccc.gr

Said Tawfiq Khoury (Arabic: سعيد الخوري) (June 6, 1923 – October 15, 2014) was a prominent Palestinian entrepreneur and philanthropist. He was one of the three founders of Consolidated Contractors Company, currently based in Athens.

CCC is the largest construction company in the Middle East and ranks among the top 25 international contractors with a revenue of US$5.3 billion in 2013. CCC has offices and projects in over 40 countries, and a workforce of more than 130,000 employees. Khoury who is listed as a billionaire by Forbes is ranked 10th on the Arabian Business world's richest Arabs in 2013. In the last years of his life, Khoury dedicated most of his time to the organisation he founded, The Bethlehem Development Foundation, funding various development projects in the city of Bethlehem.

== Personal life ==
Khoury was born to a Palestinian Christian family in Safed, Mandatory Palestine in 1923. He was nourished in an atmosphere of strong family ties, pervasive moral influence, and a deep sense of ethnic and cultural diversity. After attending St. Luke's School in Haifa, he followed his cousin Hasib Sabbagh to Lebanon in order to study in the American University of Beirut, where both of them graduated from the faculty of engineering. Upon returning home, each of them founded a small construction company in Palestine.

After the establishment of the State of Israel, both men fled back again, this time with their families, to the capital of Lebanon, Beirut, where they began working on construction projects. Said and Sabbagh's first task was in the Tripoli airport. Khoury said they were motivated by the Nakba, "catastrophic expulsion from their homeland Palestine in 1948".

Said has three sons and two daughters, from which he has fourteen grandchildren.

He was a significant supporter of philanthropic activities in Palestine.

== Achievements ==
Said Khoury held a Legion of Merit from the President of Lebanese Republic and a Legion of Unity from the President of the Republic of Yemen. He held as well as many other Medals of Merit and Honour from different parts of the World.

Said has sponsored the establishment of the Said Khoury Information Technology Center of Excellence (SKITCE) at Al-Quds University in Abu Dis. Khoury received the HCEF Palestinian Diaspora Award given to individuals who have sustained commitment to revitalize Palestinian culture.

=== Positions and awards ===
- Three medals from the Lebanese Government the first in 1976, the second in 2004 and the third in 2013
- Medal Awarded to Said Khoury by the President of Lebanon 2014
- The Bethlehem Star Award from President Arafat
- The Jerusalem Star Award from President Mahmoud Abbas
- Two Medals from the Russian Orthodox Church. One of them is the Cesar Daniel Boskoy's medal-Senior Officer-presented by Patriarch Alexei the Second
- Medal of Peter the Great -first class- from the Russian Federation
- Medal from the Orthodox Church in Jerusalem
- Golden Medal from the General Maronite Council
- AUB Merit Award
- Medal of St. Catherine's Order- Sinai
- Medal of Archon Depurates from His All Holiness Ecumenical Patriarch Bartholomew

=== Honorary Doctorates ===
- The American University of Beirut
- The Lebanese American University
- The Birzeit University
- The Russian Federation Academy of Security, Defense, Law & Order
- The Medical Foundation of Kazakhstan

==== Positions held ====
- Governor of Palestine in the Arab Monetary Fund
- Chairman of the Board of International Business Group (IBG)*Chairman of the Board of “Al Iktissad Wal-Aamal” in Lebanon
- Chairman of the Board of Palestine Electric Company, Gaza
- Chairman of the Board of Palestinian Student Fund.
- Honorary – Chairman of the Board of Trustees of the Welfare Association, Geneva
- Honorary Chairman of the Board of Trustees of the Institute of the Palestinian Studies in Beirut
- Honorary Chairman of the Board of Trustees of Al Sakakini Cultural Center
- Member of the Board of Trustees of the Greek Orthodox Archdiocese of Antioch in Western & Central Europe
- Member of the Board of Trustees of the Palestinian Initiative for the Promotion of Global Dialogue & Democracy – Miftah
- Member of the Board of Trustees of the Bethlehem Foundation-Washington, D.C.
- Member of the Board of Trustees of the Institute of Palestinian Studies-Beirut, Lebanon
- Member of the Board of Trustees of the Greek Orthodox Archidiocese of Antioch in Western & Central Europe.

=== Member of the Board of Directors ===
- Bank Audi, Beirut
- Canvest Corporation N.V., Canada
- Deputy chair of the Arab Life & Accident Insurance Co. Jordan

== See also ==
- Palestinian Christians
