= Association of Clean Water Administrators =

- Abbreviation: ACWA
- Established: 1961
- Type: Nonprofit
- Location: Washington, D.C.
- Region served: United States
- President: Jennifer Feltis
- Executive Director & General Counsel: Julia Anastasio
- Website: https://www.acwa-us.org
- Formerly called: Association of State and Interstate Water Pollution Control Administrators

The Association of Clean Water Administrators (ACWA) is a professional organization in the United States, representing state, interstate and territorial officials working in the field of water quality, specifically the protection of surface waters. It was established in 1961 as the Association of State and Interstate Water Pollution Control Administrators. ACWA works with the federal government and among its members on implementation of the Clean Water Act.

The organization was renamed Association of Clean Water Administrators in 2011. ACWA is a non-partisan, tax-exempt organization under Section 501(c)(3) of the Internal Revenue Code.

== Clean Water Act implementation ==
ACWA has worked with the U.S. Environmental Protection Agency (EPA) to coordinate state agency development of discharge permit requirements and permittee compliance in the National Pollutant Discharge Elimination System (NPDES) program. It has also worked with EPA and state agencies on the development of water quality standards for surface water bodies.
