= Hasib Sabbagh =

Palestinian businessman (1920 – 2010)

- Born: 1920; Tiberias, Israel
- Died: 12 January 2010 (aged 89–90); United States

Hasib Sabbagh (Arabic: حسيب الصباغ, also spelled Hassib; 1920 – 12 January 2010) was a Palestinian businessman, activist, and philanthropist.

== Personal life and education ==
Sabbagh came from a Palestinian Christian family in Safed in Palestine, although he was born in Tiberias. He graduated from the Arab College of Jerusalem in 1938, and in 1941 gained a civil engineering degree from the American University of Beirut.

Sabbagh attended the Government Arab College of Jerusalem, which only the top public school students in Palestine attended. It was headed by Ahmad Samih al-Khalidi (ar) and staffed by some of the finest teachers in the Arab world. It was an extremely regimented boarding school, and very high standards were set for the students. They were expected to study night and day, and were allowed only one day off for sports and other recreational activities. It was there that he established some of his long-term friendships.

In 1938 Sabbagh enrolled at the American University of Beirut, as a sophomore, in the college of engineering; attending AUB was to be one of the more significant experiences of his life. Not only was he being trained for his future profession, but he was also exposed to a rich and varied political life. AUB students came from throughout the Arab world, and represented many political currents: there were the Syrian nationalists, followers of Antun Sa'adeh, the communists led by Khalid Bikdash, the Arab nationalists whose ideologue was Professor Constantine Zureik of AUB, and the Arab Ba‘thists who adhered to Michel ‘Aflaq's ideas.

Sabbagh died on 12 January 2010 after a long illness.

== Work as an Activist and Mediator ==
In 1970, Sabbagh met Yasser Arafat, chairman of the PLO, at the house of a mutual friend, Abdul Majid Shoman, in Beirut. Since that time, he developed a close relationship with Arafat and other members of the PLO leadership. Sabbagh, Basel Aql, and Walid Khalidi became intermediaries between the PLO and the Lebanese government, trying to inform and explain the complexity of Lebanese confessional politics to Arafat and his colleagues and interceding on behalf of Palestinian refugees with the Lebanese authorities. It was the Lebanese civil war, however, that made Sabbagh an activist — an activist for peace and reconciliation between the various Lebanese parties and between the Palestinians and the Lebanese.

Sabbagh recognized the danger of the situation in Lebanon when, in April 1975, twenty-six Palestinians were shot to death by Phalangist forces in ‘Ayn al-Rumanah, in retaliation for the assassination of two of their bodyguards. The next day, he met with Abu Iyad, the PLO's second in command, at Walid Khalidi’s house. The Palestinian leadership had also understood the potential threat to Lebanese — Palestinian relations this incident portended. Abu Iyad asked Sabbagh to convince the Maronite patriarch, Antonius Butrus Khraysh, to condemn the killing publicly in order to preempt a further deterioration of the situation. Sabbagh, accompanied by a member of the Phalangist party, visited the patriarch, who agreed to make a statement on the radio that same evening condemning the killings. Sabbagh also asked the patriarch to invite both Pierre Gemayel, the leader of the Phalangist party, and Arafat for lunch at the patriarchate to effect a reconciliation between them and their communities. The invitation was accepted by Gemayel, but Arafat declined, saying that it was too soon after the ‘Ayn al-Rumanah killings to meet with Gemayel. Sabbagh strongly believed that had that meeting occurred between the two leaders at the onset of the conflict, it may have prevented much of the bloodshed and disaster that took place in the following days, months, and even years. Sabbagh was involved in many other efforts to bring leaders of the various factions together in order to resolve conflicts or prevent their escalation.

Throughout the war, Sabbagh acted as intermediary and mediator, trying to find solutions to the conflict that was destroying the country. He passed messages from the PLO to the United States administration and back to the PLO (although he was not the only channel that Arafat used to communicate with the United States). In 1982, after the Israeli invasion of Lebanon, Sabbagh accompanied by Munib al-Masri and Abdul Majid Shoman, went to Saudi Arabia to ask King Khalid to intercede with the United States in an effort to stop Israel's bombing of Beirut, to allow the PLO to leave the city. When the bombing stopped, Sabbagh was instrumental in passing information from the PLO to the United States about the PLO's conditions for its peaceful departure from Beirut.

A longtime member of both the Palestine National Council and of its central council, Sabbagh provided crucial international contacts for Arafat during the 1970s and 1980s. Most controversially, his 1978 meeting with the Phalange, first agreed to and then denounced by Arafat, provoked condemnation from the Lebanese and Syrian governments as well as from Palestinian opposition groups. In 1988, his active support encouraged Arafat to steer the Palestine Liberation Organization firmly toward a renewed peace initiative.

== Consolidated Contractors Company ==
Along with four other contractors, in 1943 he established the Consolidated Contractors Company (CCC) in Haifa. Sabbagh left Palestine in April 1948 and moved to Lebanon. CCC was reestablished in Lebanon in 1950, becoming the region's largest multinational company and one of the largest contractors worldwide. Sabbagh was a billionaire and ranked 16th on the world's richest Arabs.

== Philanthropy ==
Sabbagh founded Diana Tamari Sabbagh Foundation in 1979 following the death of his wife Diana Tamari. The founding board of trustees members included Sabbagh himself, his three children, Khalil Abou Hamad, Adel Afifi, Samih Alami, Walid Khalidi and Abdul Majid Shoman.

Through the Diana Tamari Sabbagh Foundation, one of the largest Arab charitable foundations, Sabbagh supported institutions of higher education across the Arab world and the West, and has influenced a range of dialogue initiatives, notably in the United States at the Council on Foreign Relations, the Carter Center, and the Center for Muslim - Christian Encounter, and in Palestine within the Palestinian Initiative for the Promotion of Global Dialogue and Democracy (MIFTAH), under Hanan Ashrawi. He also co-founded the Welfare Association for Palestinians, chaired the Palestinian Students Fund, and has been on the boards of the Arab Bank and of many academic institutions and pro-Palestinian think tanks, such as the Institute of Palestine Studies.

== See also ==
- Palestinian Christians
