= Columbus School of Law =

Law school in Washington, D.C.

The Catholic University of America Columbus School of Law
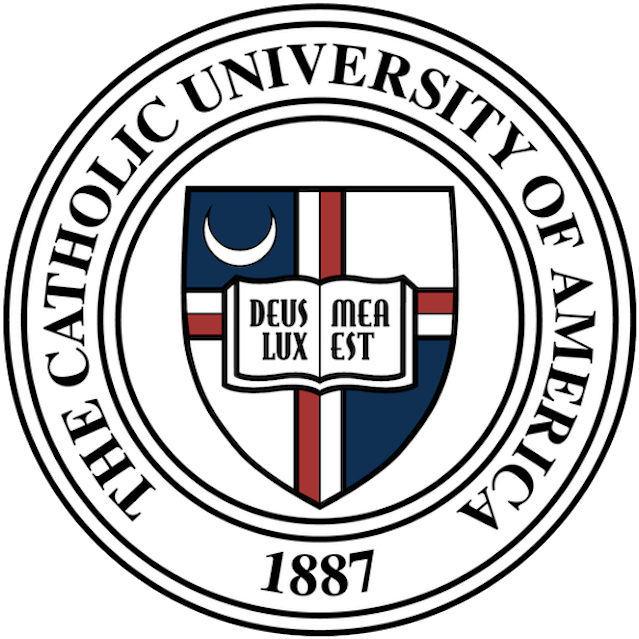
- Motto: Deus Lux Mea Est (Latin for God Is My Light)
- Parent school: Catholic University of America
- Religious affiliation: Roman Catholic
- Established: 1898; 128 years ago by the Knights of Columbus
- School type: Private law school
- Dean: Stephen C. Payne
- Location: Washington, D.C., U.S. 38.936°N 76.997°W
- Enrollment: 374
- Faculty: 110 (36 full-time; 74 part–time)
- USNWR ranking: 71st (tie) (2025)
- Bar pass rate: 84.47% (2023 first-time takers)
- Website: law.edu
- ABA profile: ABA Required Disclosures
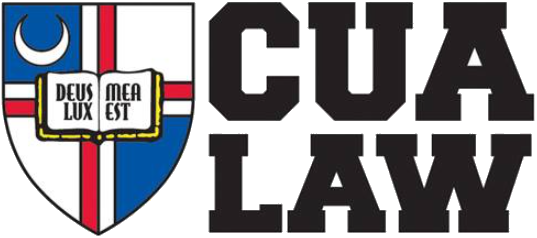

The Catholic University of America Columbus School of Law is the law school of the Catholic University of America, a private Roman Catholic research university in Washington, D.C., United States.

More than 370 Juris Doctor students attend the school. Incoming classes are typically composed of about 125 students, including day and evening programs. Around 1,250 students apply annually. According to Columbus School of Law's ABA-required disclosures, 72.5% of 2023 graduates obtained full-time, long-term employment requiring bar passage (i.e., as attorneys) within ten months after graduation.

== History ==
Catholic University of America began offering instruction in law in 1895, as part of its decision to open "faculties for the laity." The department was turned into an official school in 1898.

In 1919, the Knights of Columbus founded an educational program known as Columbus University which provided an evening education program for Catholic war veterans returning from World War I. This institution was closely affiliated with Catholic University and shared faculty at both institutions' Washington, D.C., locations. In 1954, Columbus University (then consisting only of an evening law school) merged with Catholic University's law school to form the Columbus School of Law.

The law school has been a member of the Association of American Law Schools since 1921 and accredited by the American Bar Association since 1925. Its first African-American student was enrolled in 1902; its first female student in 1922.

== Rankings ==
In the 2025 "Best Law Schools" edition of U.S. News & World Report, the Columbus School of Law is ranked 71st out of 197 schools. Its part-time program is ranked tied for 29th out of 68.

== Admissions ==
For the class entering in 2024, the law school accepted 435 out of 1256 applicants (34.63%), with 125 of those accepted enrolling, a 28.74% yield rate (the percentage of accepted students who enrolled). One student was not included in the acceptance statistics. The class consists of 126 students. The median LSAT score was 160 and the median undergraduate GPA was 3.64. Three students were not included in the LSAT calculation, and two students were not included in the GPA calculation. The reported 25th/75th percentile LSAT scores and GPAs were 158/162 and 3.38/3.76.

== Student body ==
Of Columbus School of Law's 2024 newly enrolled first year students, 102 (81%) attend full-time and 24 (19%) attend part-time. In 2025, according to U.S. News & World Report, 59.4% of the total student body was female and 40.3% male. The student body was 68.6% white, 7.2% Hispanic, 6.4% Black or African American, 4.1% Asian, 0.5% Pacific Islander, 0% American Indian, 7.2% two or more races, 4.4% unknown race, and 1.3% international.

Over 30 student organizations are active on campus. The school has a moot court program with teams practicing in international law, communications law, labor law, constitutional law, securities law, national security, and a trials competition. The moot court team holds an annual inter-school competition between first year students ("1Ls") called SoapBox.

== Costs ==
For 2024, annual tuition and fees were $60,392 for full-time J.D. students and $2,982 per credit for part-time J.D. students. The annual estimated cost for J.D. students living off campus, which cost includes tuition, fees, and living expenses, was $91,934 for full-time students and an additional $31,542 for part-time students. 100% of part-time students and 92% of full-time students received some amount of discount through scholarships or grants, with 52% and 48%, respectively, receiving less than 1/2 tuition. Between 2019 and 2022, the average annual increase in tuition and fees was 9.7%.

== Employment outcomes ==
Within nine months of graduation, 59% of 2021 graduates obtained full-time, long-term employment requiring bar passage (i.e., as attorneys); 23% obtained employment in full-time, long-term positions where having a J.D. was preferred; 2% obtained employment in other full-time, long-term professional positions; and the remaining 16% either obtained short-term positions or part-time positions, did not obtain employment, or did not report their employment status. None of those jobs were school-funded positions. Graduates who obtained full-time, long-term positions within nine months of graduation became employed in a variety of contexts, including approximately 4% in federal judicial clerkships, 15% in state and local judicial clerkships, 24% in government, 29% in private practice, 21% in business and industry, 6% in public interest, and 1% in education. Geographically, most of Catholic Law's 2021 graduates who became employed within nine months of graduation were hired to work in Washington, D.C., followed by Virginia and Maryland.

Catholic Law ranked 150th out of the 201 ABA-approved law schools in terms of the percentage of 2013 graduates with non-school-funded, full-time, long-term, bar-passage-required jobs nine months after graduation.

== Academics ==
=== Curriculum ===
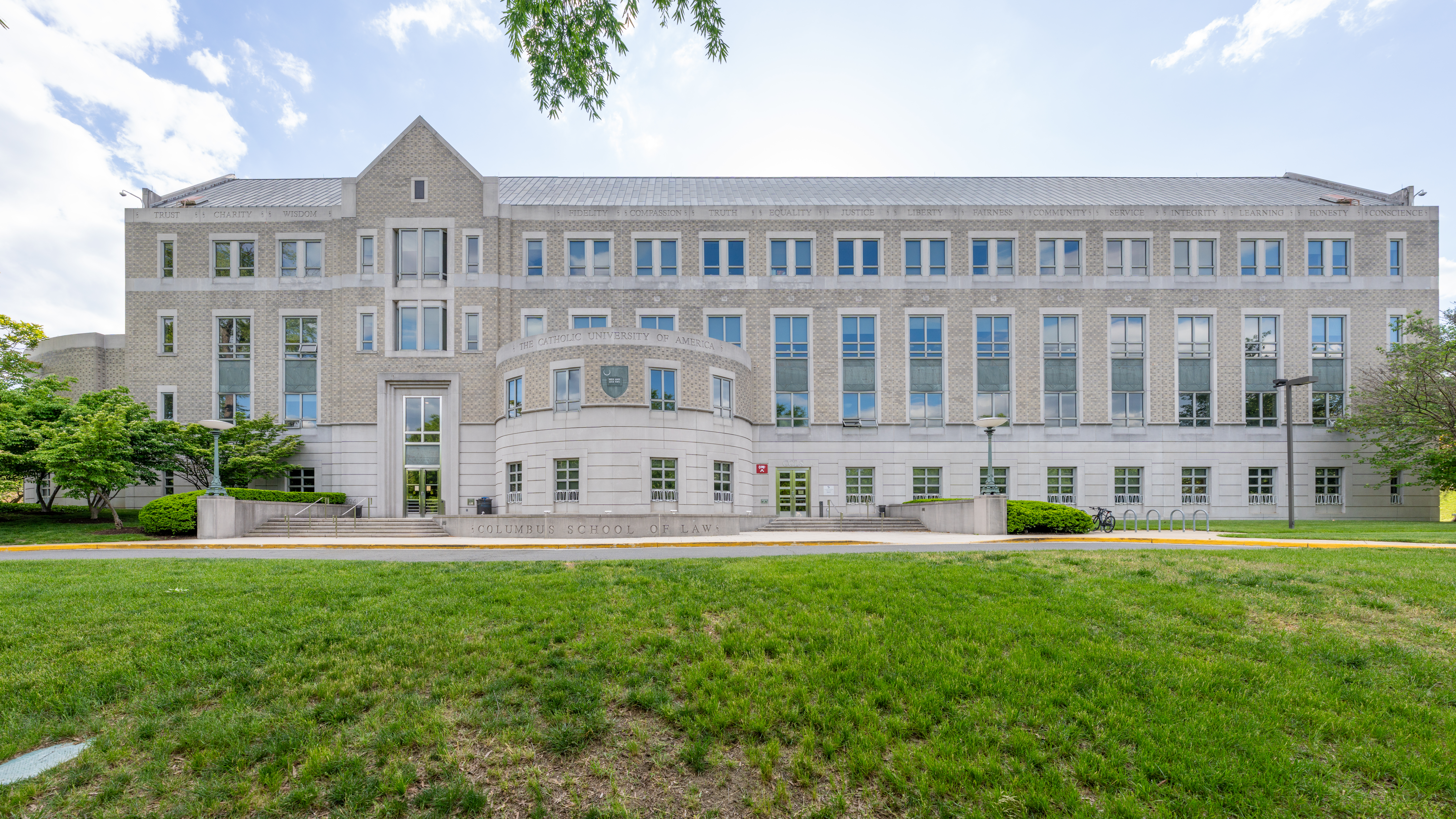
Columbus School of Law

Catholic University's J.D. program can be completed over three years of full-time day study or four years of part-time evening study. The first-year curriculum is prescribed for all students. The day-division curriculum consists of seven required courses totaling 29 credit hours. Evening-division students are required to complete the same basic courses within the first two years of their law school career. Revised for 2013, the curriculum is designed to strengthen first-year doctrinal courses, to support the development of practice-area concentrations, and to emphasize training that will help graduates transition to the real world of practice.

The upper-division curriculum comprises several requirements, courses that are strongly recommended, and elective options. Students must complete a minimum of 84 credits to earn the J.D. degree. Required upper division courses include Constitutional Law II, Professional Responsibility, Professional Skills, and Upper-Level Writing. The law school is developing a Transition-to-Practice requirement for students. This requirement is expected to be fulfilled by taking either a clinical course or a capstone course. Foundational courses for all areas of legal practice—and thus strongly recommended for all upper-class students—include Evidence, Corporations, and Criminal Procedure.

To respond to increasing demand for specialized legal services, the law school has developed practice-area concentrations for upper division students in Civil Litigation, Criminal Litigation, Family Law, Intellectual Property, Labor and Employment Law, and Securities Regulation.

=== Degrees offered ===
In addition to the J.D. program, the school offers LL.M. programs in Law & Technology, Securities Law, and Comparative and International Law.

The school also offers an LL.M. program in American law with the Faculty of Law and Administration of the Jagiellonian University in Kraków, Poland. It allows Jagiellonian law students and students enrolled in the CUA-JU LL.M. program to study the essential substantive and procedural elements of the legal system of the United States.

The school offers a M.L.S. degree program, which enhances the ability of professionals to work with lawyers and legal issues, to gain a deeper knowledge of a particular legal field, and to understand laws and regulations. Students can choose to concentrate in the fields of Compliance and Corporate Responsibility, Employment and Human Resources, or Intellectual Property. Alternatively, students may choose a General U.S. Law option, which provides a broad overview of the law and legal practice.

=== Faculty ===
In 2024, the law school Catholic Law had 110 faculty members, including 36 full-time faculty members and 74 part-time faculty members. The law school's student-faculty ratio was 7.1 to 1.

=== Institutes and programs ===
Catholic Law offers five opportunities for specialized legal study; four of them are certificate-granting. The programs are designed to give students the opportunity to pursue a specified concentration of courses. Each institute accepts approximately 15 students each academic year. They are:

- Comparative and International Law Institute
- Compliance, Investigation, and Corporate Responsibility
- Law and Public Policy Program
- Law and Technology Institute
- Securities and Corporate Law Program

=== Experiential learning ===
Founded in 1969, Columbus Community Legal Services offers four legal clinics that offer students hands-on learning. The Columbus Community Legal Services clinics include the General Practice Clinic; the Families and the Law Clinic; Advocacy for the Elderly; and the Consumer Protection Clinic. In addition, the school offers the Criminal Prosecution Clinic, the Immigration Litigation Clinic, the Innocence Project Clinic and Clemency Project, the Virginia Criminal Defense Clinic, and an SEC Student Observer Program.

The Columbus School of Law has an extensive legal externship program through which about 200 upper-class students per year earn course credits during the fall, spring, and summer semesters by working in nonprofit organizations; federal, state, and local government agencies; Congress; and for judges, law firms, trade associations, and corporations in the D.C. area.

=== Publications ===
The Columbus School of Law has two student-edited law journals:

- Catholic University Law Review
- Catholic University Journal of Law and Technology

== Campus ==
The Columbus School of Law is located on the campus of the Catholic University of America, and law students have access to many of the same services and facilities as undergraduate students. Completed in 1994, the law school building contains the classrooms, offices, law library, and courtrooms. The building is located in the Brookland neighborhood of Washington, D.C., and is a five-minute walk from the Brookland-CUA metro station.

== Notable alumni ==
=== Congress ===
- Bob Casey Jr. (JD, 1988), former U.S. Senator for Pennsylvania
- Tom Harkin (JD, 1972), former U.S. Senator for Iowa

=== Federal government ===
- Kathleen Q. Abernathy, former Federal Communications Commission commissioner
- Charlene Barshefsky (JD, 1975), former United States Trade Representative
- Naomi C. Earp, former U.S. Equal Employment Opportunity Commission member
- John H. Fanning (LL.B, 1941), deceased former National Labor Relations Board Chair
- Daniel M. Gallagher (JD, 1998), formerly one of the commissioners of the U.S. Securities and Exchange Commission
- Brendan Carr (JD, 2005), chair and a commissioner of the Federal Communications Commission
- David Redl, former Assistant Secretary for Communications and Information at the United States Department of Commerce

=== Federal judiciary ===
- Edward J. Damich (JD, 1976), Senior status Judge of the United States Court of Federal Claims, former chief judge
- John F. Dean (JD, 1975), former trial judge of the United States Tax Court
- Colleen Kollar-Kotelly (JD, 1968), Senior status Judge of the U.S. District Court for the District of Columbia, former judge, and former presiding judge, of the Foreign Intelligence Surveillance Court
- Joseph F. Leeson, Jr. (JD, 1980), Judge of the United States District Court for the Eastern District of Pennsylvania
- Christine Luchok Fallon (JD, 1977), former Reporter of Decisions for the U.S. Supreme Court

=== State government ===
- Martin Connor (JD, 1970), former New York State senator
- Kathy Hochul (JD, 1984), Governor of New York
- Susan Longley (JD, 1988), former state senator from Maine
- Peggy Quince (JD, 1975), former justice of the Florida Supreme Court
- Robert A. Watson (JD, 1986), former Rhode Island House member and minority leader who had to resign
- Stephen McNichols (LL.B, 1939), deceased former governor of Colorado
- Kelly Noonan Murphy (JD, 2000), state representative in Maine
- Charles A. Pomeroy (LL.B, 1936), deceased former justice of the Maine Supreme Judicial Court
- John A. Sabatini (1975), state senator in Rhode Island
- William J. Shea (LL.B, 1925), deceased former Connecticut Supreme Court justice

=== Business ===
- Michael Bidwill (JD, 1990), Arizona Cardinals owner and president

=== Non-profit ===
- Alexandra Dunn (JD, 1994), executive director and general counsel of the Environmental Council of States
