= Minnesota Freedom Caucus =

US ultra-conservative political group

- Chairman: Eric Lucero
- Founded: February 23, 2026; 54 days ago
- Split from: House Republican Caucus
- Ideology: Limited government; Right-wing populism
- Political position: Right-wing to far-right
- National affiliation: Republican Party

The Minnesota Freedom Caucus is a legislative caucus in the Minnesota legislature that promotes ultra-conservative policies like limited governance, personal freedom, and a traditional social agenda on issues such as immigration. It is affiliated with the State Freedom Caucus Network, and modeled after the U.S. House Freedom Caucus. Its members all belong to the Republican Party.

== History ==
In an effort to promote ultra-conservative policies in state legislatures, the Conservative Partnership Institute launched the State Freedom Caucus Network, which provides training and resources to state lawmakers who launch or join a Freedom Caucus in their state legislature. In February 2026, Republicans from both the state House and Senate formed the Minnesota chapter of the Freedom Caucus, becoming the 15th state to join the Network. The inaugural Caucus House Leader, Rep. Drew Roach, said the Caucus is "a unified block of principled conservatives" that will bring an end to "the era of unchecked progressive overreach" in the state. The Caucus launched with seven Republican members. Roach went on to say the Caucus will promote "personal responsibility, free enterprise, safe streets, quality education without indoctrination, and the God-given rights enshrined in our Constitution."

== Political positions and involvement ==
The Caucus favors advancing its legislative initiatives through single-issue bills, as opposed to omnibus bills. The group seeks to reduce taxes and spending legislation, calling the state's current spending levels "reckless" and funding "wasteful fraudulent programs." It also seeks to promote "clean voter rolls" through reviews and audits, advance gun rights, and increase the scope of parental rights in education.

=== Intra-party relationship ===
Caucus members maintain membership in the traditional legislative Republican caucuses, and have said they work alongside other Republicans to advance conservative policies.

=== Immigration ===
Several members of the Caucus expressed support for President Trump's federal immigration operations within the state, and the possibility of invoking the Insurrection Act of 1807 to accomplish the administration's goals. In response to deaths of U.S. citizens related to federal immigration activities, the Caucus said ". . . there is no right to thwart federal, state or local law enforcement and the state of order among our citizens." The statement blamed the deaths on "coordinated effort[s] to stop law enforcement by politicians in Minnesota and around the country . . ."

=== Impeachment efforts ===
In April 2026, many members of the Caucus sponsored impeachment resolutions against Governor Tim Walz and Attorney General Keith Ellison, accusing both of "corrupt conduct" in relation to fraud in state-funded social programs. The effort failed in a party-line committee vote.

== Membership ==
Membership to the caucus is invitation-only.

=== Current members ===
- Sen. Eric Lucero – Chairman
- Sen. Nathan Wesenberg – Caucus Senate Leader
- Sen. Bill Lieske – Assis. Caucus Senate Leader
- Sen. Michael Holmstrom
- Rep. Drew Roach – Caucus House Leader
- Rep. Ben Davis
- Rep. Mike Wiener
