= West Virginia Freedom Caucus =

US ultra-conservative political group

- Chairman: Chris Anders
- Founded: April 16, 2026; 4 months ago
- Split from: House Republican Caucus
- Ideology: Limited government; Right-wing populism
- Political position: Right-wing to far-right
- National affiliation: Republican Party

The West Virginia Freedom Caucus is a legislative caucus in the West Virginia legislature that promotes conservative policies like limited governance, personal freedom, and a traditional social agenda on issues such as immigration. It is affiliated with the State Freedom Caucus Network, and modeled after the U.S. House Freedom Caucus. Its members all belong to the Republican Party.

== History ==
In an effort to promote ultra-conservative policies in state legislatures, the Conservative Partnership Institute launched the State Freedom Caucus Network, which provides training and resources to state lawmakers who launch or join a Freedom Caucus in their state legislature. Republican members of the West Virginia legislature partnered with the Network to launch the West Virginia chapter. Delegate Chris Anders, the inaugural Caucus Chairman, said the Caucus will join "principled conservatives" who believe in "limited government, fiscal responsibility and protecting individual liberty" while reducing "debt and bureaucracy". He went on to accuse some legislative Republicans of failing to advance Republican values while in office.

== Political positions and involvement ==
=== Education ===
The Caucus has opposed expansions of existing loans and bailouts to educational institutions, accusing them of contributing to rising inflation in the state.

=== Gun rights ===
The Caucus has expressed support for the Second Amendment. In May 2026, Anders organized a counter-demonstration to a gun buy-back program where he offered to pay cash for guns that would have been destroyed in the buyback program hosted by a local Presbyterian church.

=== Taxes and spending ===
In the wake of the 2026 Iran war, the Caucus requested Governor Patrick Morrisey suspend the state's fuel tax for ninety days, a move supported by Democrats in the state House. Anders said it is the government's duty to alleviate the increased cost caused by government action.

The Caucus supported the Governor's elimination of approximately $140 million in the state budget through line-item vetoes, and blamed "RINO leadership" for passing the spending in the first place.

== Membership ==
=== Current members ===
- Del. Chris Anders – Chairman
- Sen. Craig Hart
- Sen. Chris Rose
- Sen. Laura Chapman
- Del. Henry Dillion
- Del. Laura Kimble
