= Louisiana Freedom Caucus =

US ultra-conservative political group

- Chair: Beryl Amedee
- Vice Chair: Raymond Crews
- Founded: April 2023; 3 years ago
- Ideology: Limited government; Right-wing populism
- Political position: Right-wing to far-right
- National affiliation: State Freedom Caucus Network
- Seats in the House Republican Conference: 13 / 73 (Note: Total representation may not be shown as some members are anonymous)
- Seats in the State House: 13 / 105
- Seats in the Senate Republican Conference: 3 / 28
- Seats in the State Senate: 3 / 39

The Louisiana Freedom Caucus is a legislative caucus in the Louisiana State Legislature that promotes ultra-conservative policies that promotes limited governance and a traditional social agenda on issues such as crime, immigration, and public welfare. It is affiliated with the State Freedom Caucus Network. Its members all belong to the Republican Party.

== History ==
In an effort to promote ultra-conservative policies in state legislatures, the Conservative Partnership Institute launched the State Freedom Caucus Network, which provides training and resources to state lawmakers who launch or join a Freedom Caucus in their state legislature. Three Republican Louisiana state Representatives created the Louisiana chapter of the Freedom Caucus in April 2023, becoming the eleventh state to launch such a caucus.

The caucus helped establish the Louisiana Freedom Caucus political action committee the same month, but has distanced itself from controversial voter outreach tactics the PAC used in the 2024 election, such as criticizing a gay Republican running for a state House seat.

== Political positions and involvement ==
The caucus claims to have authored 27 of the bills signed into law at the end of the 2024 legislative session, which saw a rightward tilt following the election of Republican governor Jeff Landry, replacing his Democratic predecessor Jon Bel Edwards.

=== Hunting ===
The Caucus supported efforts to roll back bans on deer baiting, which were decried by hunters and Ted Nugent as harmful to rural businesses and the rights of individuals.

=== Spending ===
In April 2024, now-Chairwoman, Rep. Beryl Amedee, sponsored a bill that would prohibit government-funded services from being marketed or labelled as "free". Amedee argued that reducing reliance on government services requires a "change [in] the vocabulary" to reflect the role of taxpayers.

=== Vaccines ===
In March 2024, founding Caucus member Kathy Edmonston sponsored a bill that would have required schools to inform parents of their right to opt-out of vaccine requirements, in response to her perception that schools failed to inform parents of such an option during the COVID-19 pandemic.

== Membership ==
Caucus membership is not published, and is invitation only. Members may disclose their membership, however.

=== Current members ===
- Rep. Beryl Amedee – Chairwoman
- Rep. Raymond Crews – Vice Chairman
- Rep. Phillip Tarver – Executive Officer
- Rep. Kathy Edmonston
- Rep. Jack Galle

=== Former members ===
- Rep. Alan Seabaugh – Founding chairman
- Rep. Larry Frieman
- Rep. Blake Miguez
