= Louisiana's 74th House of Representatives district =

American legislative district

Louisiana's 74th State House of Representatives district
Representative
| Peter F. Egan Sr. R–Covington |

Louisiana's 74th House of Representatives district is one of 105 Louisiana House of Representatives districts. It is currently represented by Republican Peter F. Egan Sr. of Covington.

== Geography ==
HD74 makes up part of the eastern border edge of Louisiana. It also makes up the upper half of St. Tammany Parish, including the villages of Folsom, Sun and part of the city of Covington

== Election results ==
| Year | Winning candidate | Party | Percent | Opponent | Party | Percent |
|---|---|---|---|---|---|---|
| 2011 | Scott Simon | Republican | 100% | | | |
| 2015 | Scott Simon | Republican | 100% | | | |
| 2019 | Larry Frieman | Republican | 82% | Cindy Winch | Democratic | 18% |
| 2023 | Peter Egan Sr. | Republican | 54% | Buffy Singletary | Republican | 46% |
