= Illinois Freedom Caucus =

US ultra-conservative political group

- Chair: Chris Miller
- Vice Chair: Blaine Wilhour
- Founded: May 2022; 4 years ago
- Ideology: Limited government; American nationalism; National conservatism; Right-wing populism; Trumpism; Factions: Right-libertarianism
- Political position: Right-wing to far-right
- National affiliation: State Freedom Caucus Network
- Seats in the House Republican Conference: 6 / 40 (Note: Total representation may not be shown as some members are anonymous)
- Seats in the State House: 6 / 118
- Seats in the Senate Republican Conference: 1 / 19
- Seats in the State Senate: 1 / 59

Website
- Illinois Freedom Caucus

The Illinois Freedom Caucus is a legislative caucus in the Illinois General Assembly that promotes conservative policies, such as steep spending reductions, limited governance, and the promotion of a traditional social agenda on issues like abortion, and LGBT+ policies. It is affiliated with the State Freedom Caucus Network. Its members all belong to the Republican Party, which is in the minority in both chambers, where Democrats have supermajorities.

== History ==
In an effort to promote conservative policies in state legislatures, the Conservative Partnership Institute launched the State Freedom Caucus Network, which provides training and resources to state lawmakers who launch or join a Freedom Caucus in their state legislature. Five conservative Illinois lawmakers created the Illinois chapter of the Freedom Caucus in May 2022.

Caucus Chairman, state Representative Chris Miller, called the Illinois Freedom Caucus the "umbilical to the (House) Freedom Caucus (that) sits in D.C. and through the Conservative Partnership Institute." Recognizing the Democratic-controlled nature of Illinois' politics, Network President Andy Roth said the Illinois Freedom Caucus has a role in "stop[ping] a lot of bad stuff" and highlighting to voters the perceived failures by both Democratic officials and "weak-kneed Republicans" that the Caucus believes empower or insufficiently challenge liberal policies. The Caucus has cited Democratic dominance in the state's legislature as an obstacle to achieving this agenda, however.

== Political positions and involvement ==
Miller states the Caucus advances "individual liberty, limited government, the rule of law, fiscal responsibility, fair markets, the sanctity of life, and peace through strength".

=== Intra-party relationship ===
The Caucus has clashed with the leadership of the larger House Republican Caucus. In October 2025, Caucus members criticized the leadership of the Republican's House Minority Leader, Tony McCombie. In response, McCombie stripped the members of privileges traditionally afforded to lawmakers, such as legislative staff and larger offices. The Caucus accused McCombie of "declaring war on Conservatives" and "impeding" the Caucus' efforts to elect more Republicans in state government, which is currently dominated by Democratic officials.

=== Budget ===
In June 2025, the Caucus sued leading Democratic officials for alleged failures to comply with constitutional requirements for the budget process, including reading proposed bills on three separate days. The suit claims Democrats waived that requirement in the final days of the legislative session to pass high-priority legislation.

=== Education ===
The Caucus expressed skepticism of a bill that would prohibit private schools from banning religious hairstyles and dress, citing “philosophical issues” with further regulating private institutions.

=== Energy ===
The Caucus supports increased domestic fossil fuel production and transportation, including finalizing the Keystone XL pipeline project, as a solution to rising energy costs and as a job-creation pathway

=== Abortion ===
The Caucus opposed a state law that purported to limit "deceptive practices" used by crisis pregnancy centers in the state. The group, along with national pro-life groups, labelled the law as an infringement on First Amendment protected speech, denying that such centers engage in deception. In December 2023, the Illinois Attorney General agreed to not enforce the law following a lawsuit by pro-life groups and a preliminary injunction by a U.S. district court.

=== Immigration ===
The Caucus supported President Trump's deployment of the National Guard to Chicago, also known as Operation Midway Blitz, labelling those opposed to the Operation as "pro-crime".

In November 2025, Caucus members criticized Governor JB Pritzker and state Democrats for their "sanctuary state" policies, after illegal immigrants killed two citizens in a car accident.

In December 2025, the Caucus criticized a state law that allows non-citizens to become police officers, calling it a "nightmare" that has allowed illegal immigrants to circumvent firearm and employment restrictions for non-citizens.

=== Transgender issues ===
The Caucus supports requiring transgender individuals to use bathrooms or locker room facilities consistent with their sex, rather than their gender identity.

=== Voter registration ===
The Caucus has repeatedly criticized the state's voter registration laws, raising concerns of noncitizen registration. In May 2026, the Caucus called on the United States Department of Justice to investigate the state for alleged facilitation of noncitizen registration.

== Membership ==
=== Current members ===
- Rep. Chris Miller – Chairman
- Rep. Blaine Wilhour – Vice Chairman
- Rep. Adam Niemerg
- Rep. Brad Halbrook
- Rep. Jed Davis
- Rep. David Friess
- Sen. Andrew Chesney

=== Former members ===
- Rep. Dan Caulkins – Former Treasurer
