= Missouri Freedom Caucus =

US ultra-conservative political group

- Chair: Nick Schroer
- Founded: April 2023; 3 years ago
- Ideology: Limited government; Right-wing populism
- Political position: Right-wing to far-right
- National affiliation: State Freedom Caucus Network
- Seats in the House Republican Conference: 11 / 106 (Note: Total representation may not be shown as some members are anonymous)
- Seats in the State House: 11 / 163
- Seats in the Senate Republican Conference: 2 / 24
- Seats in the State Senate: 2 / 34

The Missouri Freedom Caucus is a legislative caucus in the Missouri General Assembly that promotes ultra-conservative policies that promotes limited governance and a traditional social agenda on issues such as crime, immigration, public welfare, and abortion. It is affiliated with the State Freedom Caucus Network. Its members all belong to the Republican Party.

As of 2025, the Caucus has 11 state House of Representatives members and two state Senate members. The Missouri Secretary of State and two of its Representatives in the United States House of Representatives are former members.

== History ==
In an effort to promote ultra-conservative policies in state legislatures, the Conservative Partnership Institute launched the State Freedom Caucus Network, which provides training and resources to state lawmakers who launch or join a Freedom Caucus in their state legislature. In 2019, six Republican state Senators formed a Freedom Caucus. In 2024, members of the state House joined with the Senate Freedom Caucus to form the Missouri Freedom Caucus as an affiliate of the State Freedom Caucus Network.

== Political positions and involvement ==
The Caucus has claimed to champion traditional conservative positions, and to oppose what it views as a "uniparty" of Democrats and Republicans that do not deliver conservative policies. It aims to pull the Republican Party and the state's politics to the right. State Freedom Caucus Network President Andrew Roth said the goal of the Freedom Caucus is to "push conservative policy . . . [and] expose the fake Republicans for who they really are."

Both Democrats and non-Caucus Republicans have criticized the Freedom Caucus for "gumming up" the legislative process by obstructing typically bipartisan bills and procedures in an effort to pass their preferred legislation.

=== Intra-party relationship ===
The Caucus has often clashed with leading Republicans and the more moderate Republican Caucus, particularly in the state Senate where the tension has been labelled a "battle for operational control". As of 2025, half of the Caucus' Senate-members left, citing disagreements with the Caucus' legislative tactics. Some of these tactics included delaying legislature business through procedural motions and filibustering. Former member Sen. Jill Carter said these tactics interfered with her ability to engage in other legislative work, like attending caucus meetings and meeting with other officials.

These tactics drew irritation from mainline Republicans. After the start of the 2024 legislative session, Senate Republicans–who have a majority in the Chamber–stripped committee chairman positions, revoked parking spots, and cut the budgets of Freedom Caucus members. Senate President Pro Tem Caleb Rowden called the Caucus members "swamp creatures" and their tactics "an embarrassment". In response, then-Chairman of the Caucus Sen. Rich Brattin accused Rowden of hypocrisy and an "inability to lead." Multiple county Republican central committees rebuked the Senate leadership for the move, calling on them to resign their leadership positions. Around the same time, and in response to near-daily filibusters, Senate Majority leader and former Caucus member Sen. Cindy O'Laughlin expressed support for expelling Sen. Bill Eigel, a former leading member of the Caucus.

At the height of the tension in the 2024 legislative session, the General Assembly passed the fewest bills in living memory when compared to past sessions. However, both the Freedom Caucus and Republican leadership have called for more cooperation on key issues in the 2025 legislative session, with vocal members having left due to term limits and a lack of party primaries to encourage infighting.

=== Voting laws ===
The Freedom Caucus supports raising the threshold required for voters to amend the state Constitution, following a voter referendum that overturned the Assembly's limits on abortion.

The Caucus supports efforts to amend the state Constitution to specifically prohibit non-citizens from voting, amending the existing language that authorizes only citizens to vote.

=== Funding for professional sports ===
In 2025, Governor Mike Kehoe called a special session in a bid to keep professional sports teams in the state, rather than moving to Kansas, by offering tax incentives. The Caucus opposed such efforts, labelling them as "handout[s] to billionaire sports team owners." Brattin and fellow Caucus member Sen. Brad Hudson voted for the package, were criticized by Caucus supporters, and left the Caucus afterward.

=== Redistricting reform ===
In 2022 and 2025, the Caucus supported redrawing the state's congressional map to increase the number of reliably Republican districts. In 2025, the Caucus urged Gov. Kehoe to call a special session to redistrict the state's congressional map.

== Membership ==
=== Current members ===
- Sen. Nick Schroer – Chairman
- Sen. Adam Schnelting

=== Former members ===
- Sen. Rick Brattin – Former Chairman
- Sen. Brad Hudson
- Sen. Bill Eigel
- Sen. Denny Hoskins
- Sen. Andrew Koenig
- Sen. Jill Carter
- Rep. Justin Sparks – Former Vice Chair
- Rep. Doug Richey
