= Maryland Freedom Caucus =

US ultra-conservative political group

- Chairman: Matthew Morgan
- Founded: January 15, 2025; 19 months ago
- Split from: House Republican Caucus
- Ideology: Limited government; Right-wing populism
- Political position: Right-wing to far-right
- National affiliation: Republican Party
- Seats in the House Republican Conference: 7 / 39
- Seats in the State House: 7 / 141

Website
- https://mdfreedom.org/

The Maryland Freedom Caucus is a legislative caucus in the Maryland House of Delegates that promotes highly conservative policies focusing on limited governance, low taxes, and immigration enforcement. It is affiliated with the State Freedom Caucus Network, modeled after the U.S. House Freedom Caucus, and more conservative than the chamber's Minority Republican caucus. Its members all belong to the Republican Party.

== History ==
In an effort to promote ultra-conservative policies in state legislatures, the Conservative Partnership Institute launched the State Freedom Caucus Network, which provides training and resources to state lawmakers who launch or join a Freedom Caucus in their state legislature. In January 2025, seven of the thirty-nine Republicans in Maryland's Maryland House of Delegates formed the 13th state-level Freedom Caucus. Though, the group operated as an “unofficial” Freedom Caucus in 2024.

Matthew Morgan, the founding Chairman of the Caucus, said Maryland has a “void in conservative leadership” that he wants the Caucus to fill through a “Maryland agenda” ranging from immigration to fiscal policies. The SFCN President Andrew Roth, Maryland Congressman and U.S. House Freedom Caucus Chairman Andy Harris, and former Maryland Governor Bob Ehrlich attended the Caucus' launch announcement.

Given the dominance of Democratic politicians in the House, news sources and Democratic politicians forecast the Caucus will be unlikely to "change the dynamic" or policies adopted by the legislature. Still, Caucus members have gained notoriety for their lengthy debates and frequent introduction of amendments that are often rejected by the Democrat-dominated chamber. Kathy Szeliga, the Caucus' Vice Chairwoman, referred to the Caucus' approach to generating news stories as "operating . . . like the French resistance."

== Political positions and involvement ==
=== Intra-party relationship ===
The Caucus members have been noted by news outlets and House Republican leadership to be more outspoken and confrontational than most Republicans in the chamber. Non-Caucus Republicans advocate their preferred policies through committees, whereas Caucus Republicans aim to bring attention to their priorities through news-worthy efforts on the floor. Despite this tonal and strategic difference, House Minority Leader Jason Buckel said there is not much difference between the beliefs of the Caucus and the other House Republicans. Still, Buckel criticized the Caucus' efforts as being "more concerned with attention than they are about producing results . . ."

During the 2026 Maryland House of Delegates election, the Freedom Caucus made endorsements in three Republican primaries, including a primary challenger running against state delegate Kevin Hornberger. The Caucus sent out mailers criticizing Hornberger as a "liberal Republican" who was supported by Governor Wes Moore and former President Joe Biden; for voting for several of Moore's budgets; and for supporting a bill designating November 14 as "Ruby Bridges Walk to School Day", which the Caucus branded as "DEI indoctrination" in Maryland schools. All three of the Caucus's endorsed candidates won their primaries, marking the first time Caucus-backed candidates defeated a Republican incumbent.

=== Energy ===
The Caucus supports the continued use of fossil fuels, especially as a tool to ensure affordable energy. In 2025, the Caucus appealed to the federal Department of Energy to keep the state's oil-fired power plants open in the face of state Democrats efforts to shutter them.

In 2026, the Caucus urged state Democrats to agree to their plan to lower energy costs by freezing energy-related taxes and fees, accounting for roughly 30% of the costs borne by ratepayers in the state.

=== Immigration ===
The Caucus criticized Democratic efforts to limit the cooperation between state and local law enforcement and federal immigration officials. During the 2026 session, the Caucus criticized a "sanctuary state" bill, both for its core policy of inhibiting the enforcement of federal immigration law and for the method in which it was passed by Democrats.

=== Voting rights ===
During the 2026 legislative session, the Caucus supported bills requiring voter ID and citizenship verification in Maryland elections after U.S. Immigration and Customs Enforcement arrested Ian Roberts, a former Baltimore City Public Schools teacher, for allegedly overstaying his visa. According to the Caucus, Roberts was listed as an active voter under Maryland's voter lookup tool; Jared DeMarinis, the director of the Maryland State Board of Elections, stated that Roberts never voted in the state, that unintentional registrations can occur through agencies like the Maryland Motor Vehicle Administration, and that voters unintentionally registered to vote are not violating the state's laws against unlawful voter registration. The Caucus also opposed the Maryland Voting Rights Act, which would allow challenges to counties or municipalities that hold elections in a way that dilutes the votes cast by minority voters. In April 2026, the Caucus supported the U.S. Supreme Court's ruling in Louisiana v. Callais, which they said left the state law "little more than a symbolic bill".

In May 2026, after the Maryland State Board of Elections said that a vendor had sent the wrong party's primary ballot to an unknown number of voters and would be reissuing ballots to all mail-in voters at no cost to the state. The Caucus accused state Democrats and the Board of voter suppression, and sent the Board of Elections a letter demanding it release its voter rolls to the Federal Election Commission for a federal audit.

In August 2026, the Oversight Project and the Maryland Freedom Caucus filed a lawsuit against Question 3, challenging that lawmakers violated a new state law that requires the Maryland Secretary of State to certify statewide ballot question language for the general election by July 1 and to provide a 15-day public comment period on proposed ballot language.

=== Taxation ===
The Caucus has routinely condemned high levels or increased spending, calling them threats to future tax increases. In April 2026, the Caucus wrote to Governor Wes Moore to question why a non-profit, PaintCare, receives 100% of the revenue of a tax on each gallon of paint sold in the state. Szeliga said it is "irregular that the state would turn over such a massive program to a nonprofit."

== Membership ==
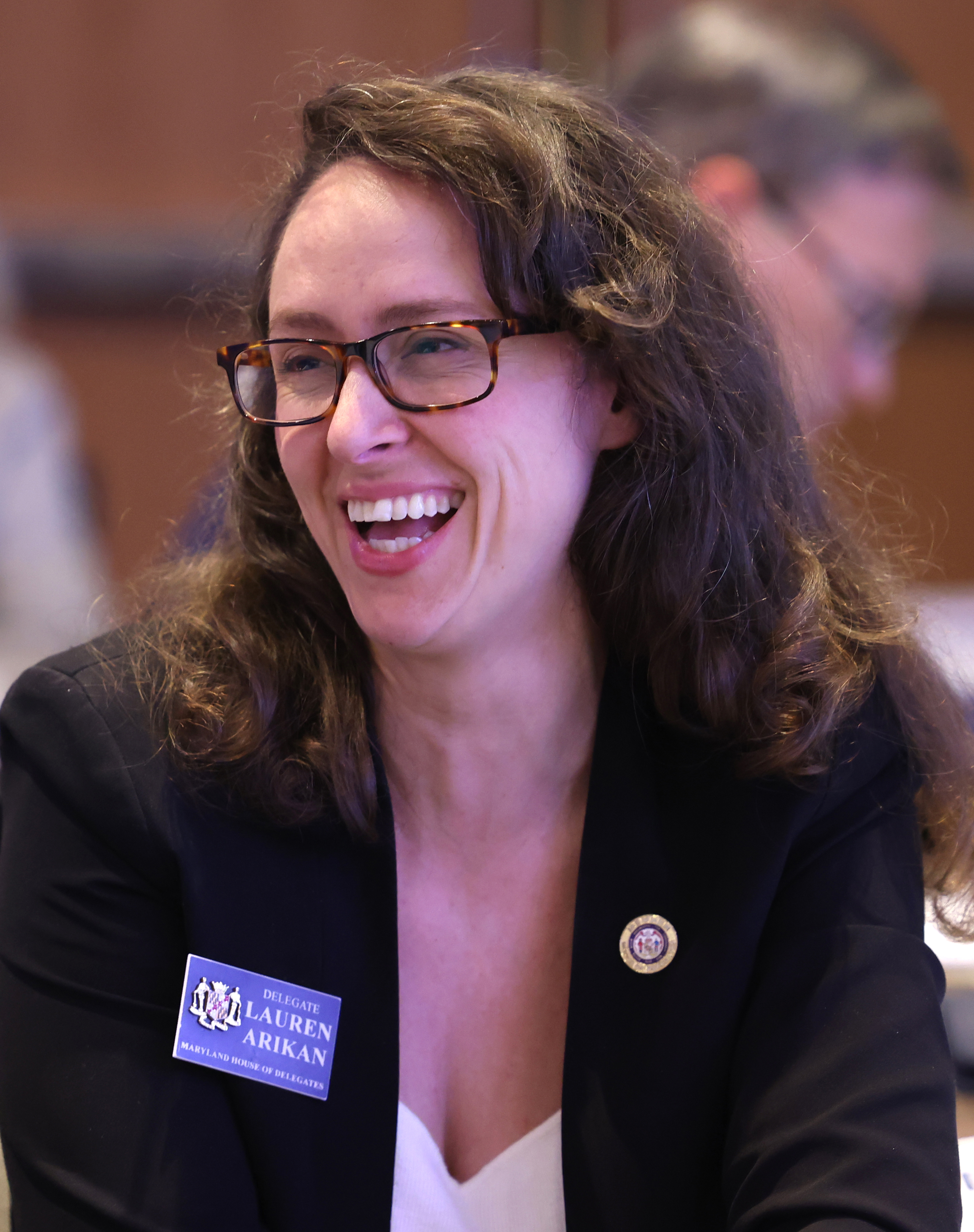
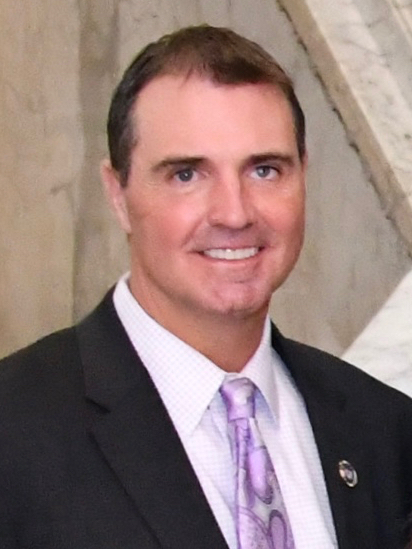
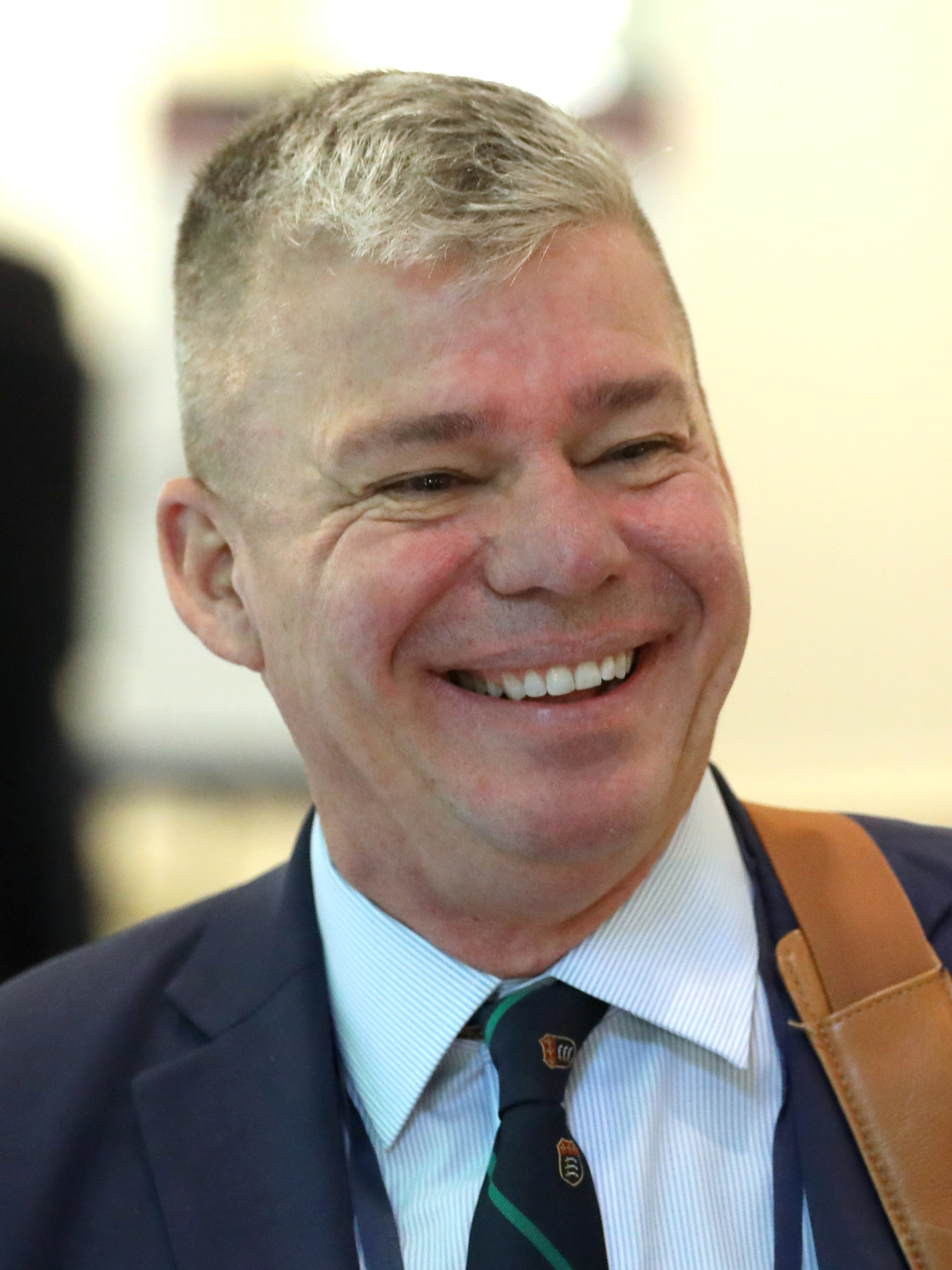
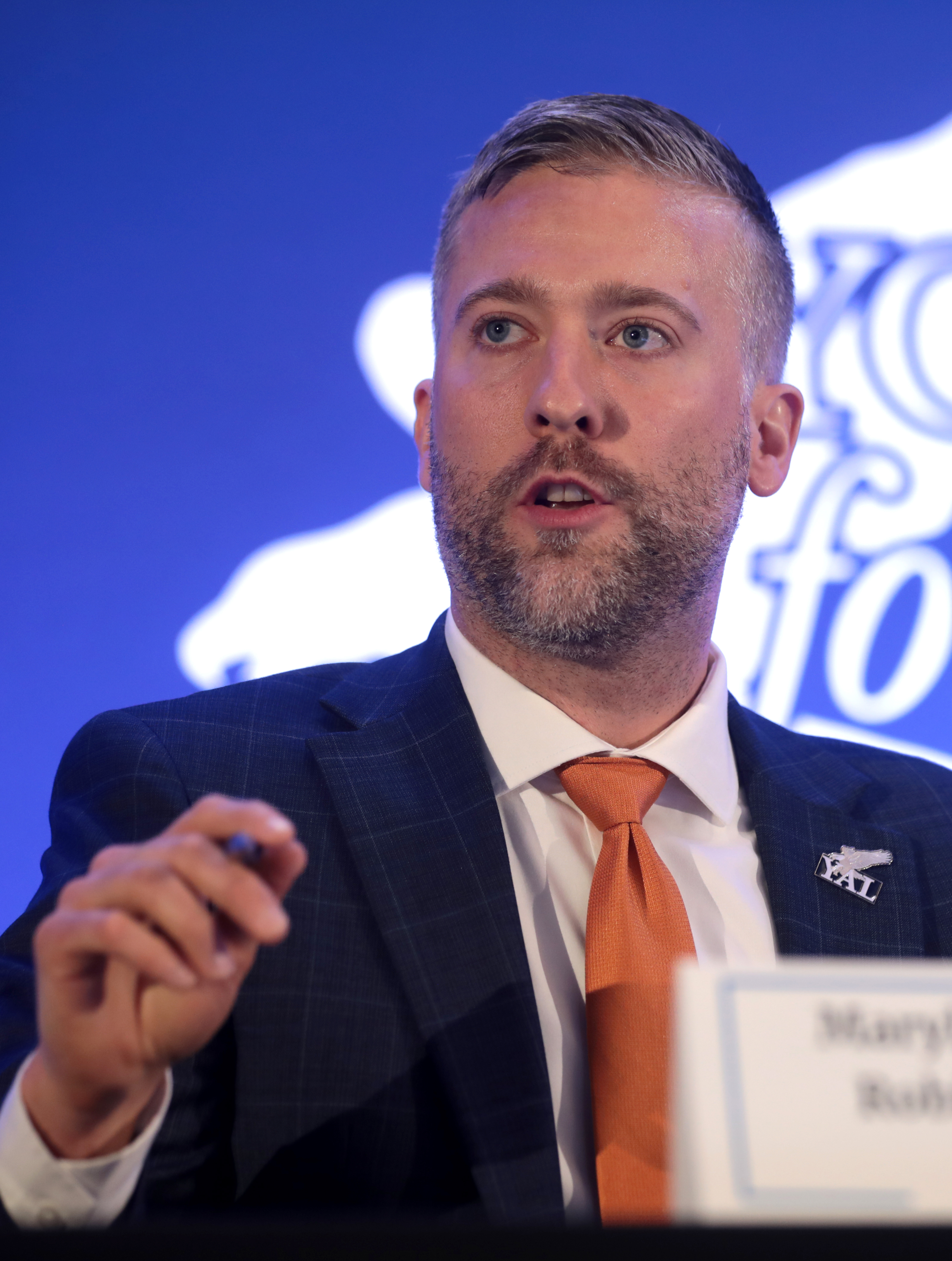
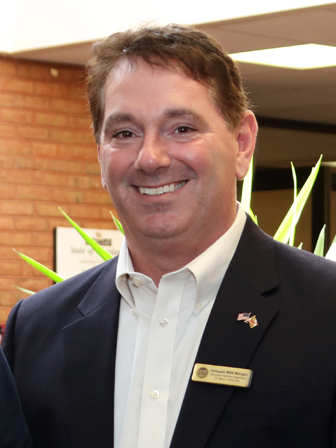
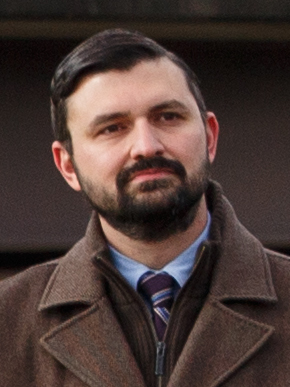
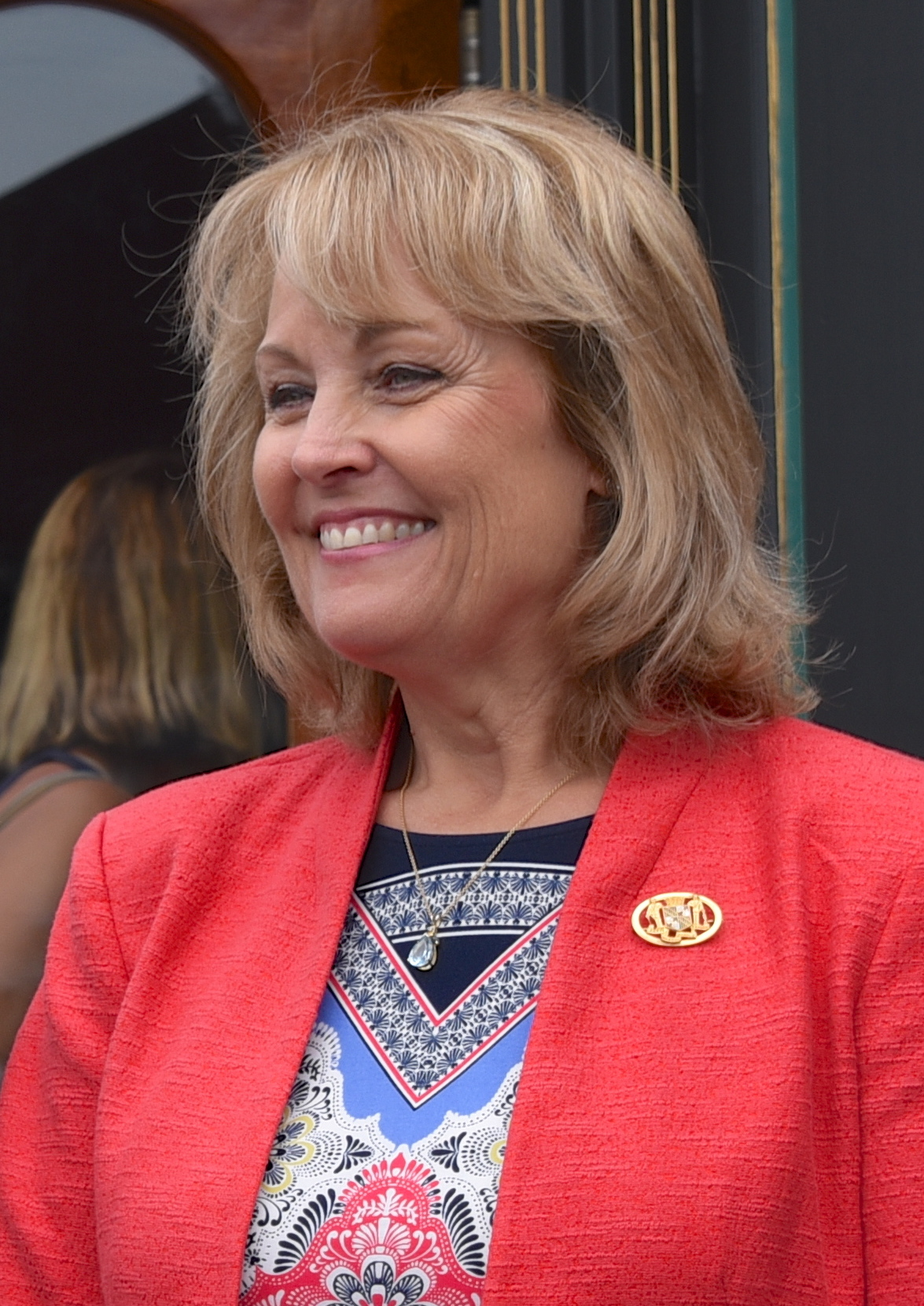
The Maryland Freedom Caucus was founded by Lauren Arikan, Brian Chisholm, Mark N. Fisher, Robin Grammer Jr., Matthew Morgan, Ryan Nawrocki, and Kathy Szeliga.

Membership to the caucus is invitation-only.

=== Current members ===
- Del. Matthew Morgan – Chairman
- Del. Kathy Szeliga – Vice Chairwoman
- Del. Ryan Nawrocki – Caucus Whip
- Del. Lauren Arikan
- Del. Brian Chrisholm
- Del. Mark N. Fisher
- Del. Robin Grammer Jr.
