= Peter Egan (disambiguation) =

Peter Egan (born 1946) is a British actor

Peter Egan may also refer to:

- Peter Egan (columnist), American writer
- Peter F. Egan, Sr., American politician
