= Derek Howell =

American politician

Member-elect of the Maryland House of Delegates from the 35B district
- Assuming office January 13, 2027
- Succeeding: Kevin Hornberger

Personal details
- Party: Republican
- Spouse: Jenna
- Children: 2
- Education: Johns Hopkins University (BS, MS); University of Baltimore (JD)
- Occupation: Attorney

Derek James Howell is an American politician, attorney, and retired police officer who is a member-elect of the Maryland House of Delegates from District 35B. He is a member of the Republican Party.

== Early life and education ==
Howell holds Bachelor of Science and Master of Science degrees from Johns Hopkins University, and a Juris Doctor degree from the University of Baltimore School of Law.

== Career ==
Howell was a Maryland State Police trooper from 1995 to 2006, leaving the force to attend law school. He is also a lawyer with The Howell Firm.

In 2010, Howell unsuccessfully ran for the Harford County Council in District B, challenging incumbent Joe Woods. Howell was defeated in the Republican primary by Woods, receiving 43.8% of the vote. At the same time, Howell was elected to the Harford County Republican Central Committee, later becoming the central committee's chair in December 2012. In August 2013, Howell announced that he would run for Maryland Senate in the 34th district in 2014, seeking to succeed Nancy Jacobs, who was retiring. He withdrew from the election hours before the candidate filing deadline, leaving Bob Cassilly as the only candidate in the Republican primary.

== Maryland House of Delegates ==
In 2026, Howell ran for the Maryland House of Delegates in District 35B, challenging incumbent Kevin Hornberger. During the Republican primary, Howell was backed by U.S. representative Andy Harris and the Maryland Freedom Caucus, who sent out mailers promoting Howell and criticizing Hornberger as a "liberal Republican". Howell defeated Hornberger in the Republican primary on June 23, 2026, with 40.0% of the vote, and defeated Democratic nominee Blessing Oluwadare in the general election. Howell was assigned to the Judiciary Committee.

== Political positions ==
During his 2010 Harford County Council campaign, Howell aligned himself with the Tea Party movement. During his 2026 House of Delegates campaign, he described himself as a constitutional conservative.

During his 2014 Senate campaign, Howell supported repealing Maryland's "Rain Tax" as well as legislation that infringes on the Second Amendment to the United States Constitution.

During his 2026 House of Delegates campaign, Howell supported cuts to government spending and taxes, as well as the privatization of some government services. He also supported increased local control of school systems, and expanding power generation in Maryland through nuclear power and deregulation.
