= Juan Carlos Chirinos =

Venezuelan writer

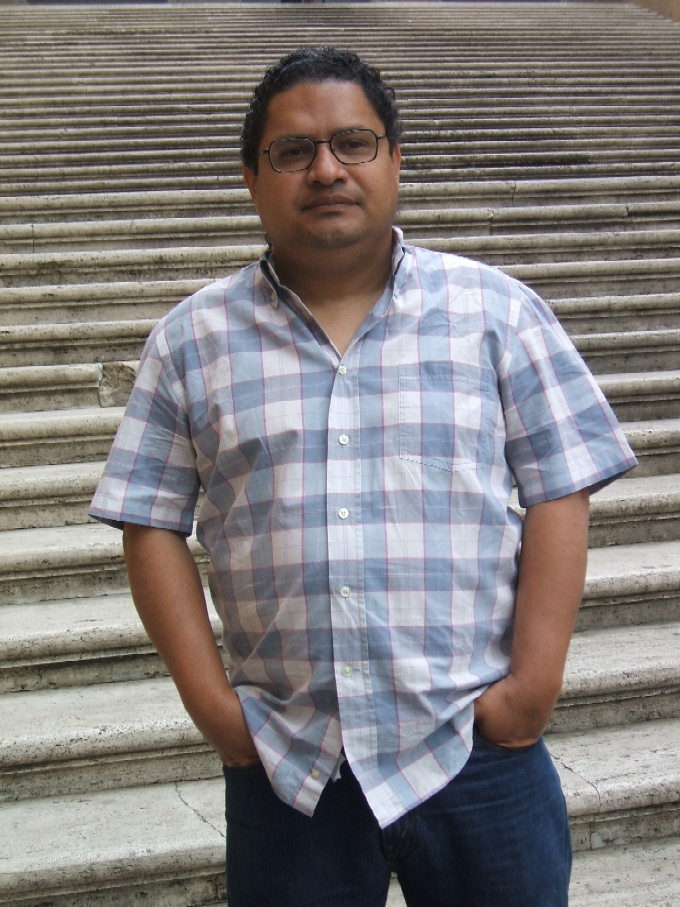
- Juan Carlos Chirinos
- Born: May 3, 1967 (age 59); Valera, Trujillo, Venezuela
- Education: Andrés Bello Catholic University; Central University of Venezuela; Salamanca University
- Occupations: novelist; storyteller; essayist; biographer; editor; lecturer; teacher; critic.
- Writing career
- Language: Spanish
- Website: Juan Carlos Chirinos

Juan Carlos Chirinos García (Valera, May 3, 1967) is a Venezuelan writer and creative writing teacher. He is a novelist, story writer and biographer. Since 2023, he is corresponding member of the Academia Venezolana de la Lengua.

== Life ==
Juan Carlos Chirinos García was born in Valera in 1967. He completed his primary and secondary education in his hometown and in 1985 moved to Caracas to study at the School of Arts of the Universidad Central de Venezuela. Two years later, he began studying literature at the Universidad Católica Andrés Bello, where he graduated in 1992. He worked at the Universidad Metropolitana, the Fundación de Etnomusicologia y Folklore, the Cinemateca Nacional and the Alejandro Otero Museum. In 1997 he arrived at the Universidad de Salamanca to study literature. Since this year he has been living in Spain, currently in Madrid.

== Books ==
- El informe sobre Clara. Nochebosque (2025), novel.
- Renacen las sombras (2021), novel.
- La sonrisa de los hipopótamos (2020), short-stories.
- Los cielos de curumo (2019), novel.
- Venezuela. Biografía de un suicidio (2017), essay.
- La manzana de Nietzsche (2015), short-stories.
- Gemelas (2013), novel.
- Nochebosque (2011), novel.
- El niño malo cuenta hasta cien y se retira (2004), novel.
- Los sordos trilingües (2011), short-stories.
- Homero haciendo zapping (2003), short-stories.
- Leerse los gatos (1997), short-stories.
- Miranda, el nómada sentimental (2006), biography.
- La reina de los cuatro nombres. Olimpia, madre de Alejandro Magno (2005), biography.
- Alberto Einstein, cartas probables para Hann (2004), biography,
- Alejandro Magno, el vivo anhelo de conocer (2004), biography.

== Anthologies ==
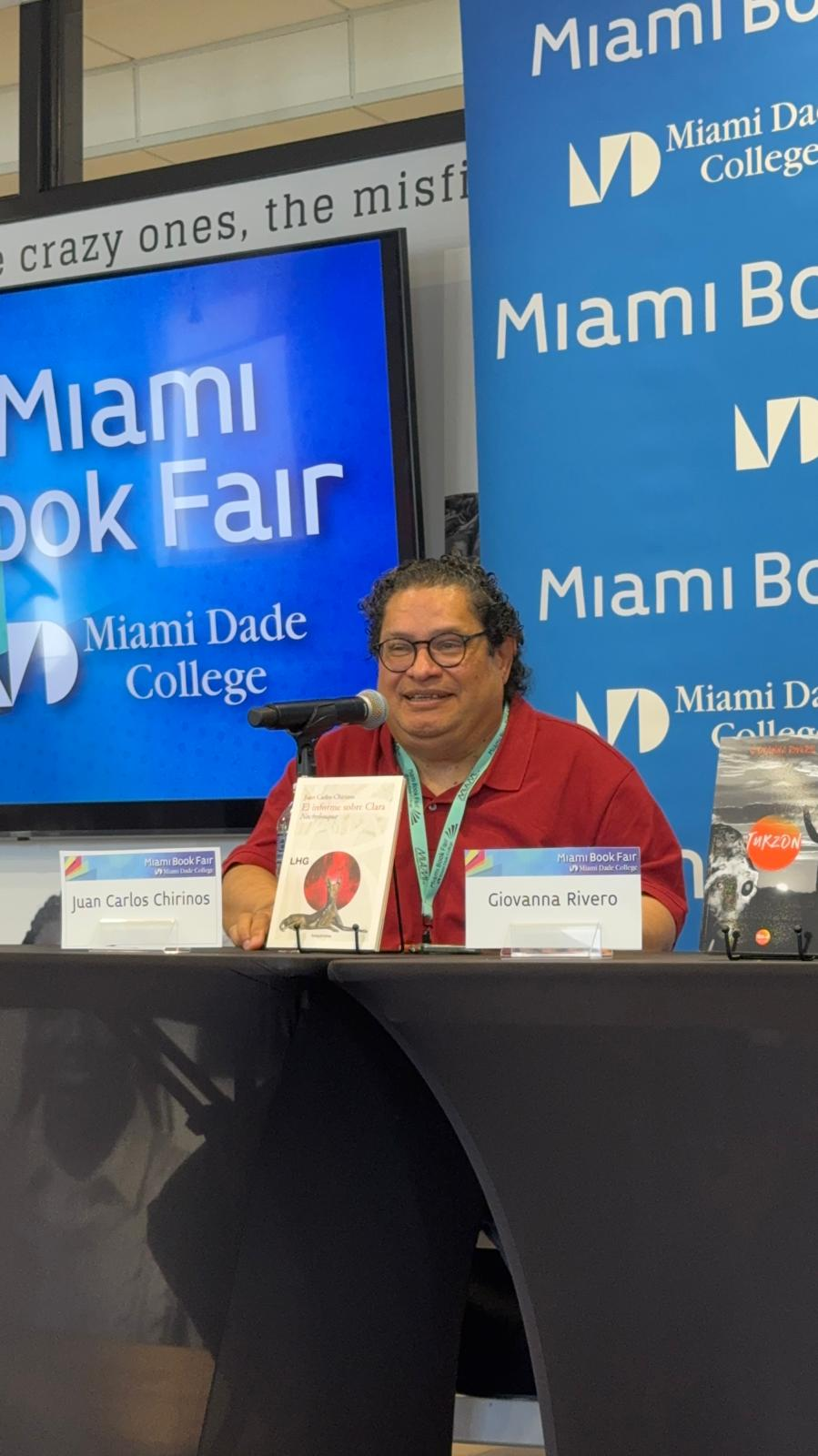
Juan Carlos Chirinos presenting "El informe Clara" at the Miami Book Fair 2025

- Salvar la frontera. Muestra de cuentos de autores venezolanos migrantes - «'Yestermorrow'» (Equidistancias, Buenos Aires, 2024. ISBN 978-6319039047)
- El adiós de Telémaco. Una rapsodia llamada Venezuela - «'Yestermorrow'» (Confluencias, Madrid, 2024. ISBN 978-84-128184-9-9).
- Escribir afuera - «España se ríe de Casandra» (Madrid, Kalathos Ediciones, 2021. ISBN 9788412331622).
- El Rapto de Europa - «La gente inteligente, como Sócrates, sabe cada vez menos», (Madrid, Calamar Ediciones, 2018. No. 37-38, ISSN 1695-5161).
- Relatos de la Orilla Negra V. 2018: Clave Binacional Italia Venezuela - «Sobre los tiranos», (Caracas, Ediciones La Orilla Negra, 2018. ISBN 978-98-042900-8-4).
- Revista Quimera, Nº 401 (Abril de 2017). - «Cuentonario», (Dossier de literatura venezolana). ISSN 0211-3325.
- Relatos de la orilla negra V - «Decir casi lo mismo», (Caracas, La Orilla Negra/Lector Cómplice, 2017. ISBN 978-98-074779-1-8).
- Encuentros y palabras - «Relato de dragón», «Laura», «Para comenzar primero por lo primario», (Salamanca, Edifsa, 2017. ISBN 978-84-943946-3-8).
- Nuestros más cercanos parientes - «Leerse los gatos», (Madrid, Kalathos, 2016. ISBN 978-84-945702-4-7).
- Cuentos memorables venezolanos - «Agnus rey», (Caracas, Planeta, 2015. ISBN 978-980-271-468-1).
- El rastro de Lovecraft - «Un espantapájaros lisiado», (Caracas, Alfaguara/Santillana, 2015. ISBN 978-980-15-0767-3).
- Revista Suelta - «La sonrisa de Peter Pan», Guatemala, 2013.
- El cuento venezolano - «La mujer de las montañas» (Caracas, EBUCV, 2013)
- Los oficios del libro - «La manzana de Nietzsche», (Madrid, Libros de la Ballena/UAM, 2011 ISBN 978-84-8344-200-5)
- Río Grande Review #37 - «El alfabeto del profesor Chomsky», (El Paso, RGR, 2011)
- La vasta brevedad - «Ichbiliah», (Caracas, Alfaguara, 2010 ISBN 978-980-15-0348-4)
- Revista Eñe, 17 (Spring 2009). - Catrusia ISSN 1699-5856
- Las distintas caras de la urbe: Una mirada a la cuentística venezolana de los años 90 in: Confluencia, Revista Hispánica de Cultura y Literatura, University of Northern Colorado (Spring, 2008 - Issue 23.2) - Leerse los gatos
- Las voces secretas - «Un ataque de lentitud», (Caracas, Alfaguara, 2007 ISBN 980-275-768-3)
- 21 del XXI - «Ichbiliah», (Caracas, Ediciones B, 2007 ISBN 978-980-6993-13-6)
- Inmenso estrecho - «La mirada de Rousseau», (Madrid, Kailas, 2006 ISBN 978-84-89624-12-2)
- Cuentos venezolanos - «Pelópidas», (La Habana, Letras cubanas, 2005 ISBN 959-03-0338-2)
- Pequeñas resistencias, 3 - «Pelópidas», (Madrid, Páginas de Espuma, 2004 ISBN 978-84-95642-42-4)
- Nueva cuentística venezolana: breve inmersión in: Hispamérica, #97, University of Maryland, 2004. - Homero haciendo zapping

== Translations into other languages ==
- English
  - Ride of the Valkyries (Cabalgata de Walkirias). Jonathan Blitzer, translator. Words Without Borders, February 2011.
  - Total, Always a Novel. Michael Redzich, translator. Latin American Literature Today, Volume 1 No. 12, November 2019.
  - Béisblood. Wladimir Márquez (Regis University), translator. 27th Annual Conference on Baseball in Literature and Culture, April 2024
- Arabic
  - Agnus rey & Homero haciendo zapping. Nedjma Bernaoui, translator. Encuentros literarios, Argel, Instituto Cervantes, 2009 NIPO 503090194
- French
  - Pélopidas. Gersende Camenen, translator. Les bonnes nouvelles de l’Amérique latine. Anthologie de la nouvelle latino-américaine contemporaine, Gallimard, «Du monde entier», 2010 ISBN 978-2-07-012942-3
  - Pélopidas. Hélène Rioux, translator. Anthologie de récits vénézuéliens contemporains, Montreal, XYZ, 2009 ISBN 978-2-89261-553-1
- Italian
  - Cabalgata de Walkirias. Barbara Stizzoli and Antonio Nazzaro, translators. Il tuo aroma nella mia pelle, Salerno, Edizioni Arcoiris, 2019. ISBN 978-88-99877-47-7
- Slovenian
  - V objemu Venezuele (El país de la cordialidad inmediata), foreword to Zgodbe iz Venezuele, antologija venezuelske kratke proze, Ljubljana, Sodobnost International, 2009. ISBN 978-961-6564-27-4. Veronika Rot, translator.

== As editor ==
- Teresa de la Parra: Ifigenia (Madrid, Ediciones Cátedra, 2026) ISBN 9788437650425. Juan Carlos Chirinos, ed..
- Teresa de la Parra: Textos recuperados (Madrid, Instituto Cervantes, 2024) ISBN 9788418210655. Juan Carlos Chirinos & Carlos Sandoval (eds.).
- José Balza: Percusión (Madrid, Ediciones Cátedra, 2022) ISBN 978-84-376-4495-0. Juan Carlos Chirinos, editor.
- Jorge Edwards: Persona non grata (Caracas, El Estilete, 2017) ISBN 980-778-621-5. (El rey siempre está desnudo, foreword).
- Thomas Carlyle: El doctor Francia (Sevilla, Renacimiento, 2017) ISBN 841-698-128-0. (El biógrafo honorable, foreword).
- Pablo Acevedo: Estrella varada (Madrid, Polibea, 2012) ISBN 978-84-86701-45-1. (Júpiter, melancólico, busca la palabra, foreword).
- José Gregorio Hernández: Sobre arte y estética (Caracas, La Liebre Libre, 1995) ISBN 980-327-270-5. (José Gregorio Hernández y la filosofía nacional, foreword).

== Awards ==
- 2023. May. Appointed Corresponding Member of the AVL (Academia Venezolana de la Lengua).
- 2022. En.-Feb. Resident writer. Asociación Cultural La Noria Aix-en-Provence (France).
- 2020. Finalist in the XVII Real Academia Española Prize, Madrid.
- 2019. Los cielos de curumo (2019) won a grant for edition from the spanish Ministerio de Cultura y Deporte.
- 2018. Finalist in the Premio de la Crítica de Venezuela.
- 2019. International Juan Rulfo Short Story Contest, Radio France Internationale. Finalist.
- 2005. The Secretaría de Educación Pública (SEP) of México chose Albert Einstein, cartas probables para Hann for the school reading program.
- 2002. First prize, José Antonio Ramos Sucre Literary Biennal, Cumaná, Venezuela.
- 2000. The short film, 3caracoles3, was chosen for the XIV Semana de Cine de Medina del Campo, Valladolid (Spain).
- 1997-1998. Fundación Gran Mariscal de Ayacucho Fellowship for doctoral studies in Salamanca University.
- 1994. First mention, Short Story Prize, Spain Embassy, Caracas, Venezuela.

== About the author ==
- Gomes, Miguel (Connecticut University): La otredad que somos, in Papel Literario, El Nacional, april 24, 2022.
- Cavallín, Claudia: La sonrisa de los hipopótamos de Juan Carlos Chirinos, Oklahoma University: Latin American Literature Today, Vol. 1, No. 18, may 2021.
- Gomes, Miguel (Connecticut University): Esta indócil fiera literaria, in Trópico Absoluto, april 26 2021.
- Carreño, Víctor (Oklahoma University): Narrativa de la emigración venezolana en el siglo XXI: Emergencia e invisibilización, Revista de Estudios Hispánicos, 54, #2, june 2020, Washington University in St. Louis. ISSN: 2164-9308
- Katie Brown (University of Exeter, UK): Writing and the Revolution. Venezuelan Metafiction 2004-2012, Liverpool: Liverpool University Press. 2019. ISBN 9781786942197
- Wilfrido H. Corral: Venezuela: Biografía de un suicidio by Juan Carlos Chirinos, in World Literature Today, Volume 92 No. 5, September 2018.
- Lyda Aponte de Zacklin (City College of New York, EE.UU.): Una parodia del mal, in Revista Cronopio, #61, July 2013.
- Elda Stanco (Roanoke College, EE.UU.): Juan Carlos Chirinos, in The Contemporary Spanish-American Novel. Bolaño and After (Will H. Corral, Juan E. De Castro, Nicholas Birns, editors). Bloomsbury, 2013.
- Jonathan Blitzer: on “Ride of the Valkyries”. Words Without Borders, 2011.
- Roberto Echeto: Dos novelas de horror y sangre, in Roberto Echeto presenta..., 01/01/2012.
- Carmen Ruiz Barrionuevo (Universidad de Salamanca, España): Juan Carlos Chirinos en la tradición literaria del mal, in: Voces y escrituras de Venezuela, Caracas, Cátedra José Antonio Ramos Sucre, 2011.
- Katie Brown: Chirinos, Dalí and Ants, en Katie Brown on Culture, 14/12/2011.
- Jorge Eduardo Benavides: El niño malo en Madrid, El Boomerang, 2010.
- Roberto Echeto: Un libro en verdad fascinante, in Roberto Echeto presenta..., 11/09/2008.
- José Rafael Simón Pérez: El niño malo cuenta hasta cien y se retira, in Letras, v. 49, n. 75, Caracas, 2007.
