= Kevin Hornberger =

American politician (born 1981)

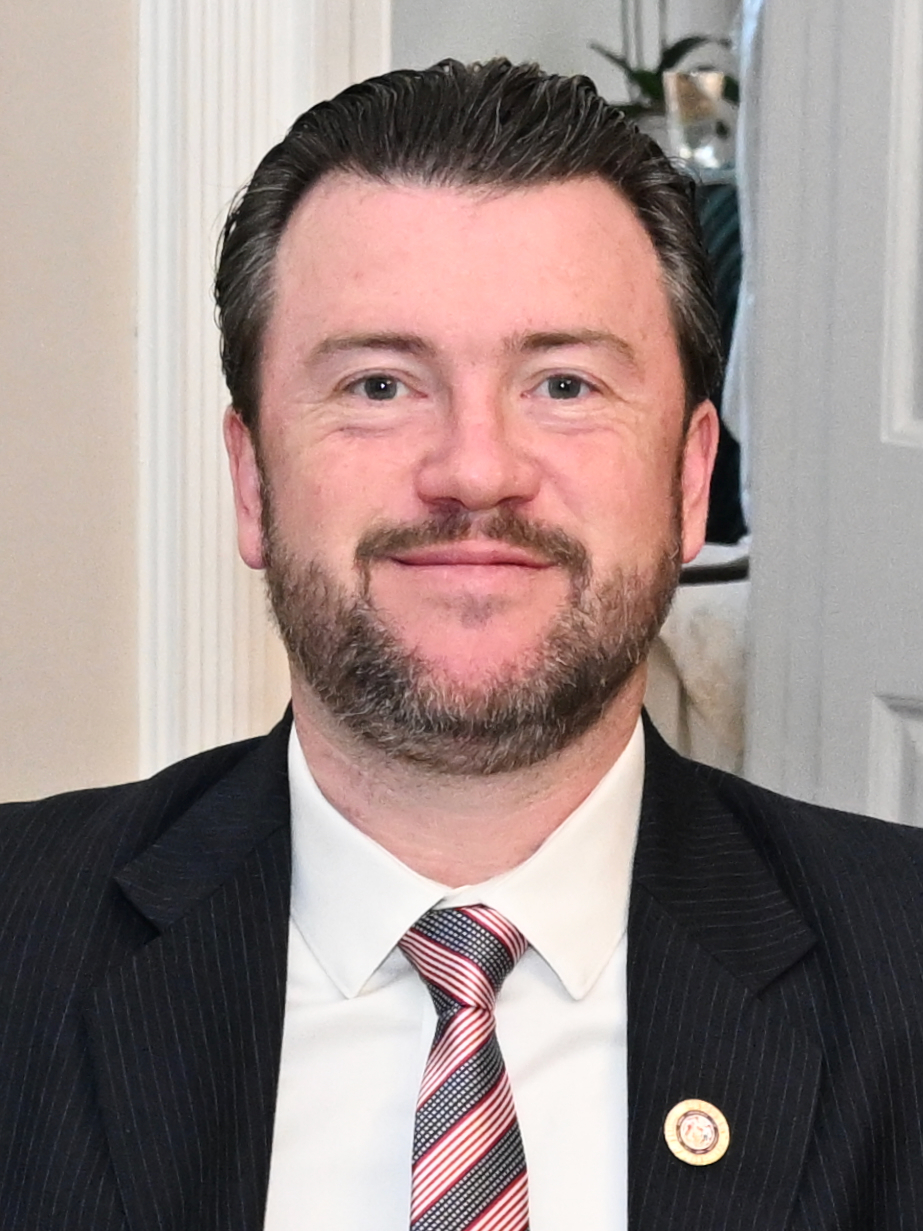
- Hornberger in 2025

Member of the Maryland House of Delegates
- Incumbent
- Assumed office January 14, 2015
- Preceded by: David D. Rudolph
- Constituency: District 35A (2015–2023); District 35B (2023–present)

Personal details
- Born: June 26, 1981 (age 45) North East, Maryland, U.S.
- Party: Republican
- Spouse: Danielle (divorced)
- Education: University of the District of Columbia; University of Maryland, College Park, Cecil College

Kevin Bailey Hornberger (born June 26, 1981) is an American politician from the Republican Party who is a member of the Maryland House of Delegates, representing District 35B. He previously represented District 35A from 2015 to 2023.

== Background ==
Hornberger was born on June 26, 1981, in North East, Maryland. He graduated from Rising Sun High School in 1999 and attended Cecil College, where he earned an associate degree in general studies in 2003. He then attended the University of Maryland from 2003 to 2004, and later graduated with honors from the University of the District of Columbia with a B.S. degree in mechanical engineering in 2010.

After graduating, Hornberger founded his own company, Blue Collar Engineering Inc., and began working as a facility manager for the Library of Congress. In 2014, he ran for the Maryland House of Delegates in District 35A, challenging incumbent Democratic Delegate David D. Rudolph, who was drawn into the district following redistricting in 2012. He won the Republican primary with a 300-vote lead over his opponent. During the general election, he was endorsed by Republican gubernatorial nominee Larry Hogan and U.S. Representative Andy Harris. He defeated Rudolph in the general election with 56.5 percent of the vote.

== In the legislature ==
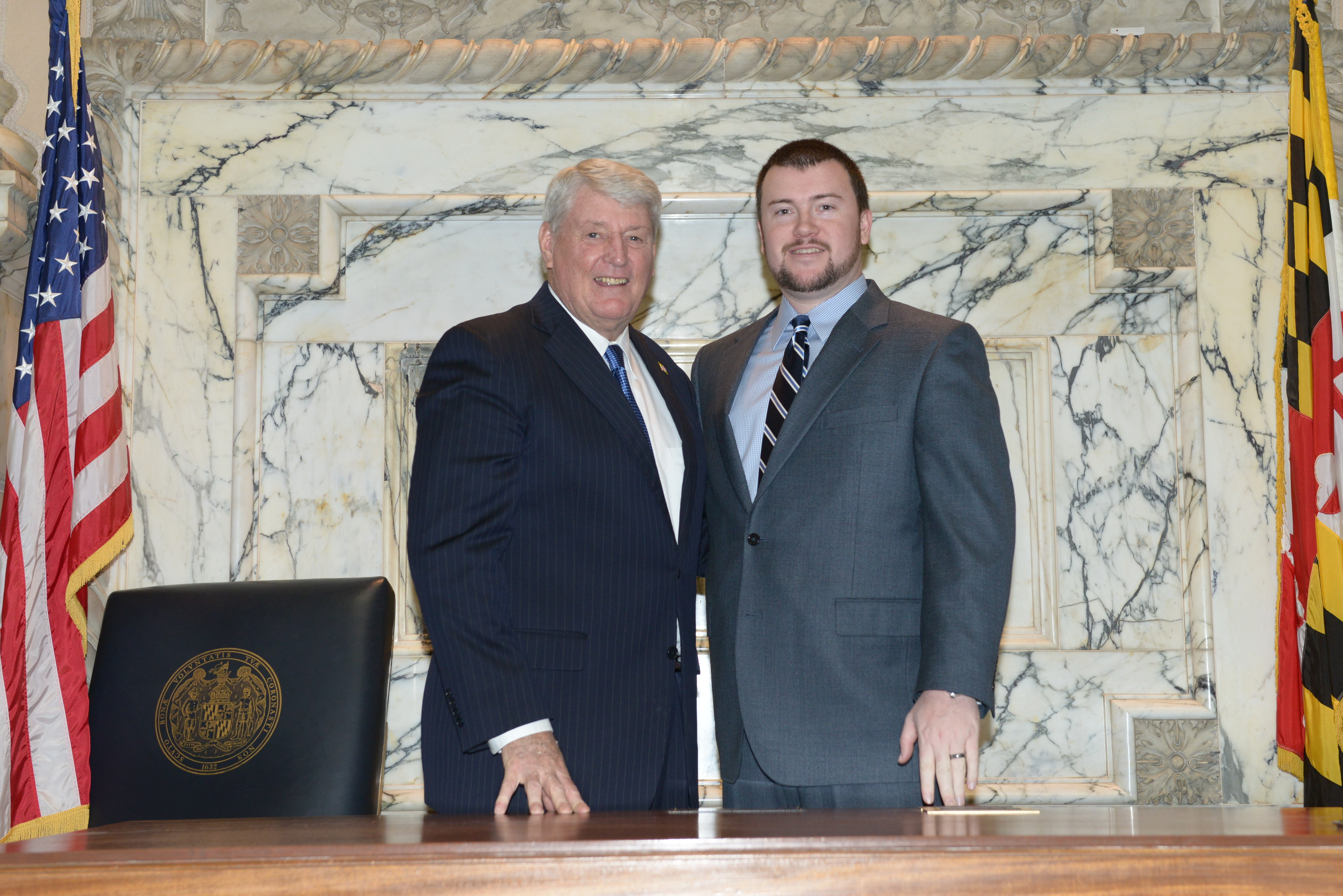
House Speaker Michael E. Busch swears Hornberger into the Maryland House of Delegates, 2015

Hornberger was sworn in as a member of the House of Delegates on January 14, 2015. He was a member of the Ways and Means Committee during his entire tenure and was a member of the Maryland Rural Caucus, Maryland Veterans Caucus, Maryland Legislative Sportsmen's Caucus, and the House chair of the Cecil County Delegation. From 2020 to 2027, he served as a deputy minority whip.

Hornberger ran for a fourth term in 2026. During the Republican primary, he faced Derek Howell, a retired police officer who was backed by the Maryland Freedom Caucus. The Freedom Caucus sent out mailers criticizing Hornberger as a "liberal Republican" who was supported by Governor Wes Moore and former President Joe Biden; for voting for several of Governor Moore's budgets; and for voting for a bill to designate November 14 was "Ruby Bridges Walk to School Day", which the Freedom Caucus branded as "DEI indoctrination" in Maryland schools. Hornberger fought back against these mailers on social media, where he made posts promoting his votes on bills to support first responders, the Second Amendment, and requiring proof of citizenship to vote in elections. Hornberger was defeated by Howell on June 23, 2026, placing third in the Republican primary with 27.5% of the vote.

== Political positions ==
=== Elections ===
During the 2020 legislative session, Hornberger introduced a bill that would require all vacancies in the Maryland General Assembly to be filled with special elections. He reintroduced the bill during the 2026 legislative session, describing it as a "pro-democracy bill".

=== Gun control ===
Hornberger identifies as "one of the fiercest advocates for the Second Amendment". During a debate on legislation to ban firearms on college campuses, Hornberger unsuccessfully introduced an amendment to exempt students or staff members who have concealed carry permits from the bill. Following the 2017 Las Vegas shooting, Hornberger voted in favor of legislation to ban bump stocks in Maryland, a vote which he later called "one of the toughest votes I've ever had to make". During a debate on legislation that prohibited life without parole sentences for juvenile offenders, Hornberger introduced an amendment that would exempt people "convicted of a crime involving the possession or discharge of a firearm inside a school building or a conspiracy to commit a crime involving a firearm inside a school building", which was rejected by a vote of 51–83.

=== Marijuana ===
Hornberger opposed legislation introduced in the 2017 legislation to legalize recreational marijuana, saying he supported medical marijuana but felt it was too early to legalize recreational marijuana. During the 2021 legislative session, Hornberger introduced legislation that would allow medical marijuana patients to possess and carry firearms.

=== Minimum wage ===
During a debate on legislation to raise the state minimum wage to $15 an hour in 2019, Hornberger unsuccessfully introduced an amendment to increase funding for health and human service organizations.

=== Social issues ===
During the 2021 legislative session, Hornberger co-sponsored legislation that would give farmers the right to repair equipment.

Hornberger opposes efforts to ban 287(g) program agreements in Maryland, saying that the program only applies to people already in custody, does not involve racial profiling, and has led to decreases in crime.

=== Taxes ===
In 2018, Hornberger campaigned on cutting Maryland's taxes. During the 2021 legislative session, he introduced legislation to provide tax refunds to business owners who had to close or reduce their operations as a result of the COVID-19 pandemic. In April of that year, Hornberger voted in favor of legislation that would let counties set bracket-based income taxes. In May 2026, he called for cuts to Maryland's taxes and state government spending, claiming that people were "leaving here because they can't afford it".

== Personal life ==
Hornberger was married to his wife, Danielle, who was the county executive of Cecil County from 2020 to 2024. Together, they have an adult son named Adam. Hornberger lives in North East, Maryland.

In April 2024, Hornberger's son filed second-degree assault charges against him, alleging that his father had shoved him to the ground, cutting his palm and scraping his wrist. Hornberger denied the accusations, saying that his son had become physically violent toward him during a discussion about his future and had fled home after Hornberger called the police. Hornberger's son also sought a restraining order against him, which was denied after Hornberger and his parents contested against it. The assault charges were dismissed in June 2024.

== Electoral history ==
Maryland House of Delegates District 35A Republican primary election, 2014
Party	Candidate	Votes	%
Republican	Kevin Bailey Hornberger	1,224	49.5
Republican	John C. Mackie, Jr.	928	37.6
Republican	Mary Catherine Podlesak	319	12.9

Maryland House of Delegates District 35A election, 2014
Party	Candidate	Votes	%
Republican	Kevin Bailey Hornberger	6,225	56.5
Democratic	David D. Rudolph (incumbent)	4,778	43.4
Republican	Mary Catherine Podlesak (Write-In)	10	0.1
Write-in		3	0.0

Maryland House of Delegates District 35A election, 2018
Party	Candidate	Votes	%
Republican	Kevin Bailey Hornberger (incumbent)	9,065	63.2
Democratic	Jobeth Rocky Bowers	5,260	36.7
Write-in		11	0.1

Maryland House of Delegates District 35B election, 2022
Party	Candidate	Votes	%
Republican	Kevin Bailey Hornberger (incumbent)	10,867	95.6
Write-in		503	4.4
