= Chris Miller (politician) =

American politician (born 1954)

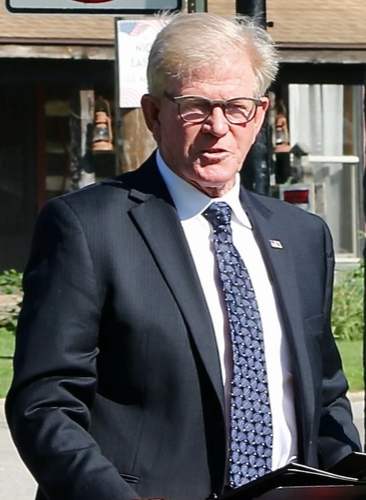

Member of the Illinois House of Representatives from the 101st district
- Incumbent
- Assumed office January 9, 2019
- Preceded by: Reggie Phillips

Personal details
- Born: June 15, 1954 (age 72) Oakland, Illinois, U.S.
- Party: Republican
- Spouse: Mary Meyer (m. 1980)
- Children: 7
- Education: Eureka College (BS)

Chris G. Miller (born June 15, 1954) is an American politician representing the 101st district in the Illinois House of Representatives. His district, in southeastern Illinois, includes all or parts of Coles, Clark, Crawford, Cumberland, Edgar, and Lawrence counties.

== Early life and education ==
Miller was born in Oakland, Illinois. He earned an associate degree from Lincoln Land Community College and a Bachelor of Science in education from Eureka College. Miller was the football coach of the local football team until 1986 when IHSA (Illinois High School Association) forcibly removed him for cheating.

== Career ==
Miller is the owner of a large farm in northern Coles County. He is a Republican, and the Chairman of the Illinois Freedom Caucus. Despite being broadly against social welfare programs, Miller’s farm has received over $1,000,000 in subsidies from the U.S. Federal government. As of 2026, public disclosure documents estimate Miller’s net worth at $16 million. The median income for a family in his home town, Oakland, is $64,000 as of 2022. Miller has introduced legislation covering education, elections, and government operations. Notable sponsored bills include:

- HB0014: Food & Drug-Bee f Packaging
- HB0015: Dept Ag-Cultivated Meat
- HB0016: Estate Tax-Exclusion Amount
- HB1160: Higher Ed-US Flag-Funding
- HB1161: Sch/Higher Ed-Sex Segregation
- HB1162: Foreign Land Acquisition & Contracts
- HB1163: Counties Cd-Solar & Wind Energy
- HB1164: EPA-Windmill Construction
- HB1219: GA Use of Private Land
- HB1220: Abortion-Informed Consent
- HB1221: Firearm Owners ID Act-Repeal
- HB1498: Elec Code-Deceased Voter
- HB1499: Elections-Residence/Students
- HB1641: SOS-ID Card
- HB2816: Property-Foreign Nationals
- HB2817: Database Resources for Student
- HB2818: Sch Cd-Rights of Parents
- HB2819: Gen Assembly-Amendment Germane
- HB2820: Educ Savings Account Program
- HB2821: Sch Cd-E-Learning-Migrant
- HB2822: Education Savings Account Prog
- HB2823: Gender in Sports
- HB2876: US & Illinois Flags Only
- HB3387: Secretary of State-Census
- HB4094: Utilities-Rogue Components
- HB4119: Sch Cd-Mental Health-Opt In
- HB4237: Katie's Law
- HB5532: Sch Cd-Mentoring-PA 102-521
- HB5608: OMA&FOIA-NGO
- HB5625: Prohibit Obstruct Right of Way
- HR0030: Audit-State Spending & Hiring
- HR0045: Diesel Exhaust Fluid-Feds
- HR0095: No Tax Increases

Legislation from Previous Assemblies

In earlier sessions, such as the 103rd General Assembly, Miller sponsored bills including HB0720 (Non-Highway Veh-55 MPH), HB0856and HB0857 (School Curriculum standards and website transparency), HB1722 (School State Funding-Nonpublic), HB1864 and HB1865(Math Learning Standards and Firearm ID Act Repeal), HB1948 (FOID Automatic Approval), and HB1972 and HB1973 (Election Voting Machines and Voter Photo ID).

Other Notable Sponsored Bills

Additional sponsored legislation tracked includes HB1493, HB5282, and HB5283(Elections Voter Photo ID and No Taxpayer Funding Abortion), HB2612 (Inc Tx-Firearm Dealer), HB3835 (Sch Cd-Nonpublic Sch Student), HB2462 (Abortion Law-Fetal Heart Beat), and HB2221 (No Taxpayer Funding Abortion). Miller also sponsored HR30(Audit-State Spending & Hiring) and HB4119(Sch Cd-Mental Health-Opt In).

Miller is part of a group of Downstate Illinois Republicans who have pushed efforts to separate Chicago from the rest of the state, contending it has too much power over the region's legislation and culture.

As of 2022, Miller is a member of the following Illinois House committees:

- Economic Opportunity & Equity Committee (HECO)
- Energy & Environment Committee (HENG)
- International Trade & Commerce Committee (HITC)

=== Attendance at January 6th events ===
On January 6, 2021, Miller attended a Save America Rally before Trump supporters stormed the U.S. Capitol. In a video posted to his public Facebook page, Miller railed against "dangerous Democrat terrorists" and said "we’re in a great cultural war to see which worldview will survive."

During the riot, Miller's truck was in a restricted area next to the Capitol. It bore a decal of the logo of the extremist Three Percenters group, which later had five of its members charged with crimes associated with the attack, including trespass and assaulting police officers.

=== Censure ===
On March 1, 2021, nearly three dozen members of the Illinois House of Representatives, including Speaker of the House Chris Welch, co-sponsored House Resolution 132 to "condemn" Miller's actions at the January 6 rally that preceded the riot at the U.S. Capitol. The resolution also references a complaint filed March 1 with the Illinois Legislative Inspector General to investigate Miller's actions on January 6.

On March 18, 2021, the Illinois House voted to censure Miller for attending the Save America rally that preceded Trump supporters' insurrection at the Capitol. The resolution by Illinois State Representative Bob Morgan alleged Miller's words and actions violated his oath of office and "created an environment that potentially threatens not only the sanctity of the Illinois General Assembly but also the safety of the members and their staff".

== Personal life ==
Miller is married to U.S. Rep. Mary Miller, elected in 2020 to represent Illinois's 15th congressional district. His state house district is largely coextensive with the eastern portion of his wife's congressional district. The couple has seven children and 20 grandchildren.

== Electoral history ==
Illinois 110th State House District Republican Primary, 2018
| Party | Candidate | Votes | % |
|---|---|---|---|
| Republican | Chris Miller | 10,302 | 65.34 |
| Republican | Terry A. Davis | 5,465 | 34.66 |
| Total votes | | 15,767 | 100.0 |

Illinois 110th State House District General Election, 2018
| Party | Candidate | Votes | % |
|---|---|---|---|
| Republican | Chris Miller | 23,955 | 65.37 |
| Democratic | Shirley A. Bell | 12,691 | 34.63 |
| Total votes | | 36,646 | 100.0 |
