= State Freedom Caucus Network =

US conservative political organization

- Formation: December 2021
- Tax ID no.: 87-3648308
- Headquarters: 300 Independence Ave SE Washington, DC 20003
- President: Andy Roth
- Website: State Freedom Caucus

The State Freedom Caucus Network is a 501(c)(4) conservative organization founded in December 2021 by veteran GOP strategist Andy Roth. Originally formed as a project of the Conservative Partnership Institute, the organization serves as an unofficial extension of the Congressional House Freedom Caucus with caucuses in nearly a dozen state legislatures.

== Mission and history ==
The mission of the State Freedom Caucus Network is "to provide conservatives in state capitals nationwide the resources they need to win." It provides support in areas such as staffing, communication, strategy, tactics and logistics.

The State Freedom Caucus Network advises its member caucuses to loudly oppose Republicans who they deem to have "compromised on fiscal and cultural conservative principles." This has led to a number of battles between state Republican leadership and caucus members, including the Mississippi and South Carolina caucuses.

Florida Governor Ron DeSantis headlined the Network's annual dinner in 2025.

== State Caucuses ==
As of 2026, the State Freedom Caucus Network has formed caucuses within fifteen state legislatures. State caucuses have framed their work as a fight for "open, accountable and limited government, the Constitution and the rule of law, and policies that promote the liberty, safety and prosperity of all Americans".

Map of all the states that have a Freedom Caucus

State
Arizona
Georgia
Idaho
Illinois
Louisiana
Maryland
Missouri
Minnesota
Montana
Oklahoma
Pennsylvania
South Carolina
South Dakota
West Virginia
Wyoming
