= Words Without Borders =

International magazine

- Masthead: Karen Phillips, Executive Director; Eric M. B. Becker, Digital Director & Senior Editor, Susan Harris, Editorial Director
- Frequency: Monthly
- Founder: Alane Salierno Mason, Founder and President; Dedi Felman, Co-Founder; Samantha Schnee, Founding Editor
- Founded: 2003; 23 years ago
- First issue: July–August 2003
- Language: English
- Website: wordswithoutborders.org
- ISSN: 1936-1459

Words Without Borders (WWB) is an international magazine open to international exchange through translation, publication, and promotion of the world's best writing and authors who are not easily accessible to English-speaking readers. The first issue appeared in July–August 2003.

== Translation and knowledge ==
Words Without Borders was founded by Alane Salierno Mason, translator of Elio Vittorini, in 1999 and began publication in 2003. It promotes cultural understanding through the translation, publication, and promotion of the finest contemporary international literature. It publishes a monthly magazine of literature in translation and organizes special events that connect foreign writers to the public; it also develops materials for high school and college teachers and provides an online resource center for contemporary global writing. Words Without Borders is supported by the National Endowment for the Arts, the New York State Council on the Arts and the Lannan Foundation, among many others.

David Orr, in The New York Times, compliments the "intelligence and idealism" of WWB.

== Prominent authors ==
Words Without Borders has featured many authors from around the globe, translating their works for English-speaking readers, including:

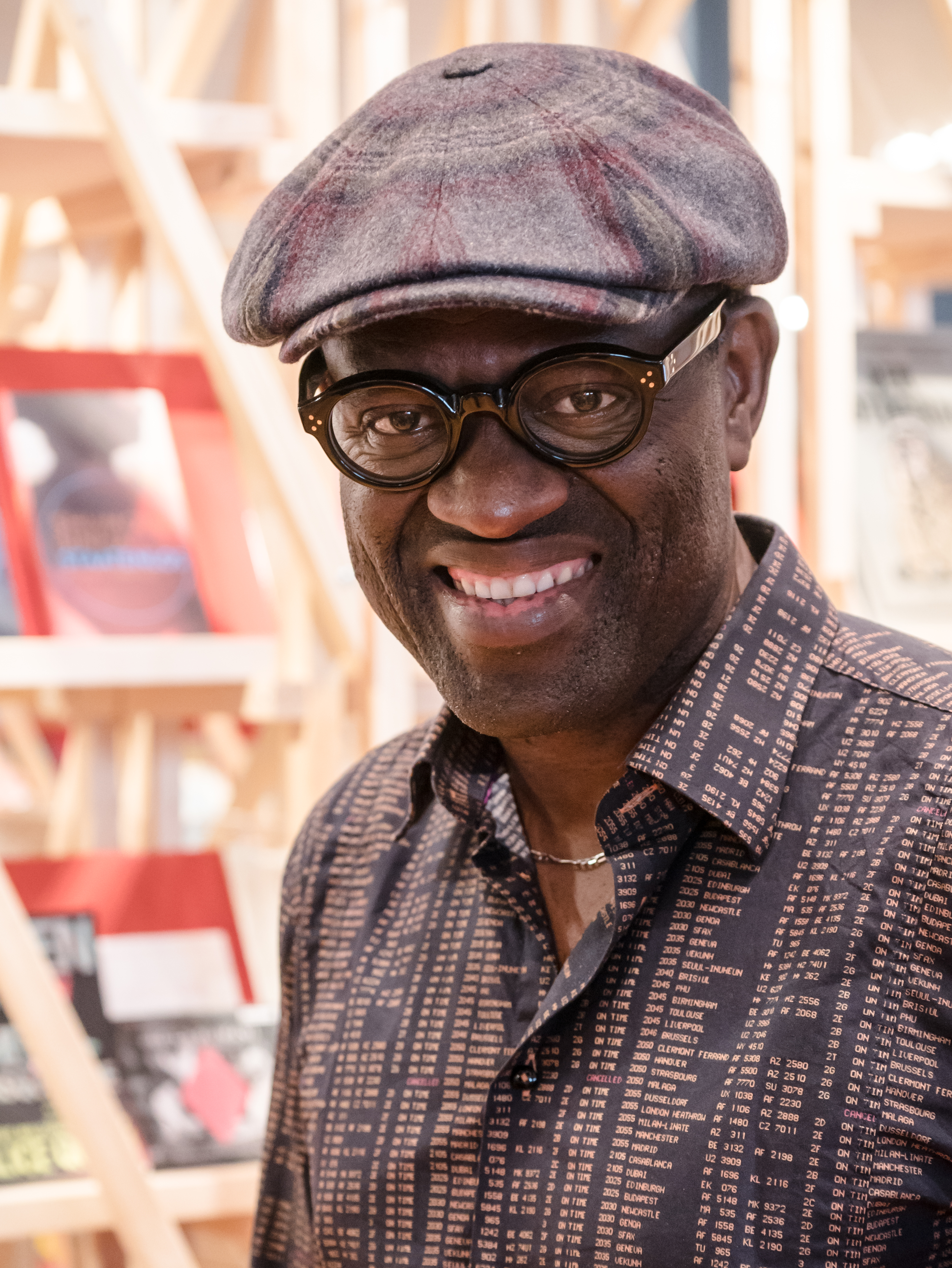
Alain Mabanckou

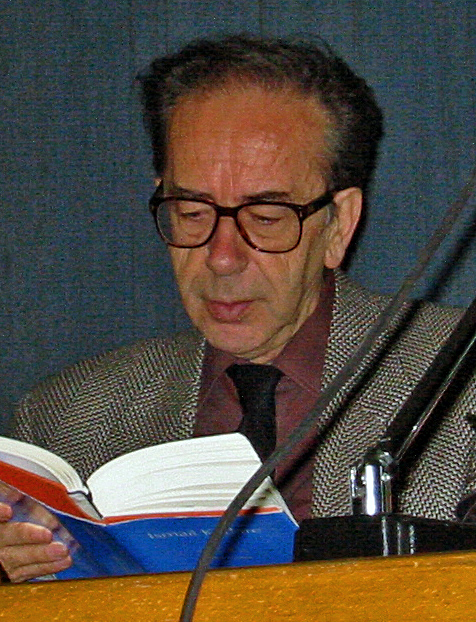
Ismail Kadare

- Juan José Millás (2003)
- Ingo Schulze (2003)
- Adonis (2003)
- Adam Zagajewski (2004)
- Elena Ferrante (2005)
- Alain Mabanckou (2005)
- Georges-Olivier Châteaureynaud (2005)
- Svetlana Alexievich (2005)
- Ko Un (2005)
- Olga Tokarczuk (2005)
- Tahar Ben Jelloun (2006)
- Jon Fosse (2006)
- Ismail Kadare (2006)
- José Eduardo Agualusa (2007)
- Herta Müller (2009)
- Juan Carlos Chirinos (2011)
- Glaydah Namukasa (2013)
- Radka Denemarková (2014)
- Rasha Abbas (2014)
- Fouad Laroui (2016)
- Yolanda Arroyo Pizarro (2019)
- Lina Meruane (2019)
- Nona Fernández (2019)

== See also ==
- American Literary Translators Association
- International Federation of Translators
