= Larry Frieman =

American politician

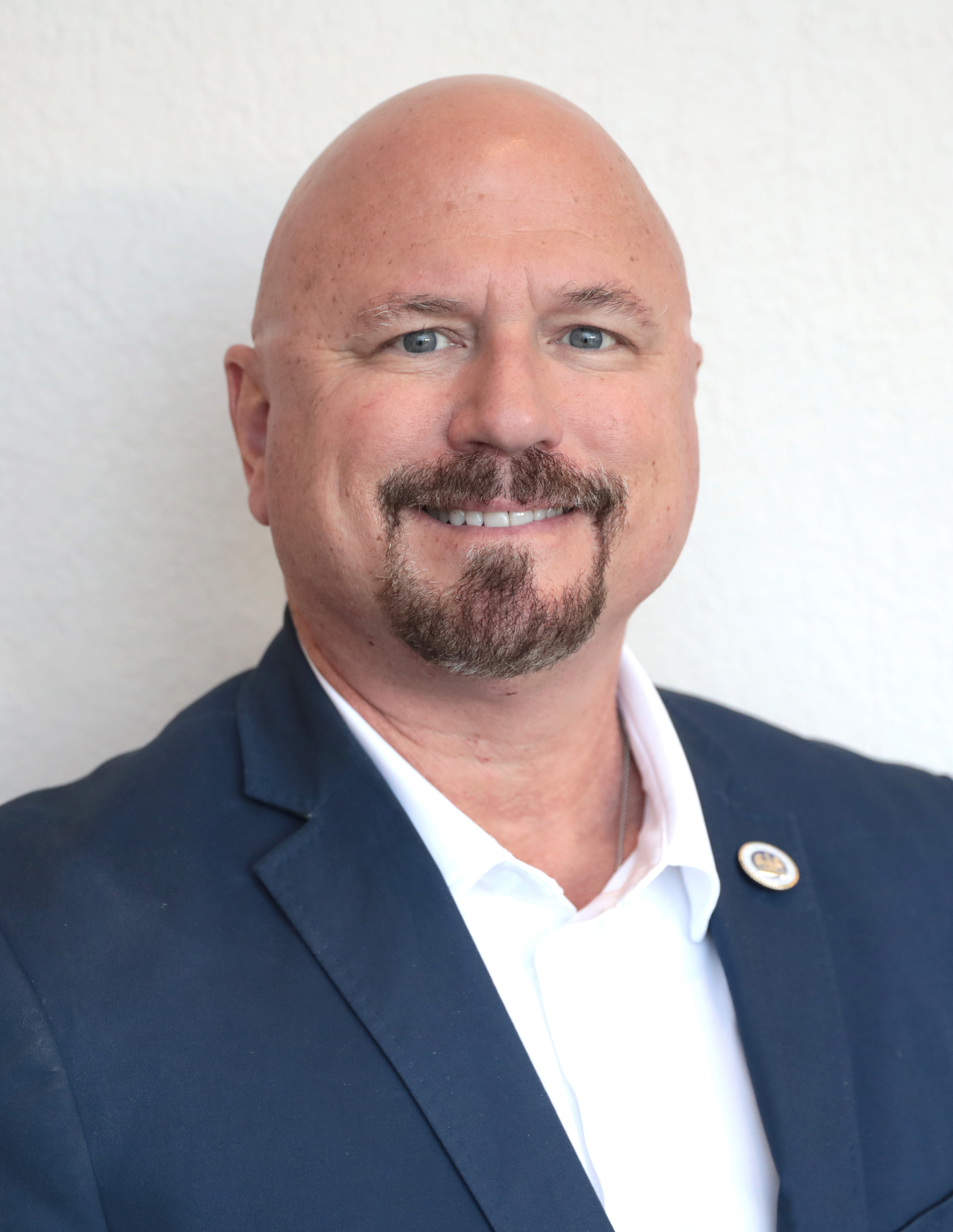

Member of the Louisiana House of Representatives from the 74th district
- In office January 13, 2020 – January 8, 2024
- Preceded by: Scott Simon
- Succeeded by: Peter F. Egan, Sr.

Personal details
- Party: Republican
- Education: Louisiana State University (BS); Loyola Law School (JD)

Larry Frieman is an American politician from Covington, Louisiana. He is a former member of the Louisiana House of Representatives, representing the 74th district. He served in office from January 13, 2020, to January 8, 2024, and was a founding member of the Louisiana Freedom Caucus. In 2023, Frieman was a candidate in the 22nd Judicial District Court Judge election, seeking to complete the term of retiring Judge Raymond Childress. He lost to Alan Black on October 14, 2023.
