= Jonathan Blitzer =

American journalist and writer

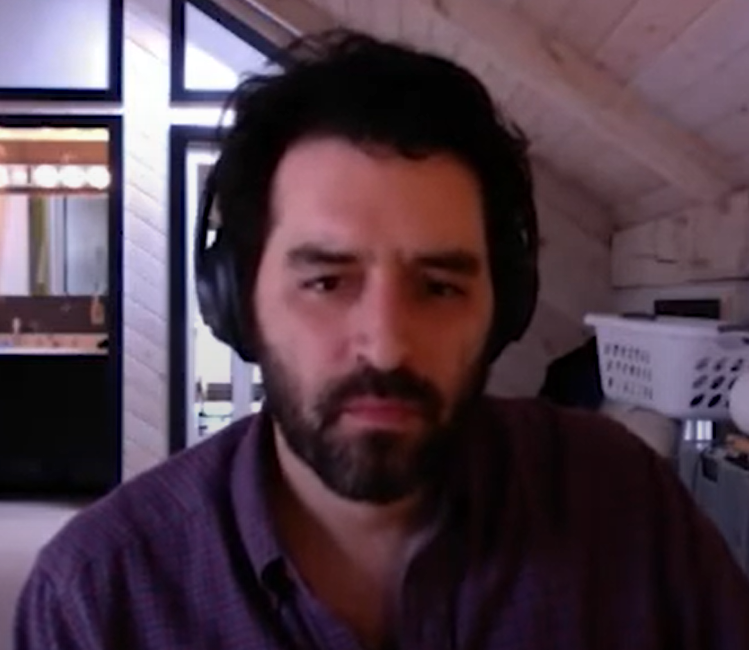
- Blitzer in 2021
- Education: Columbia University
- Occupations: Journalist, writer

Jonathan Blitzer is an American journalist and writer. He is a staff writer at The New Yorker. He has received a National Award for Education Reporting, an Edward R. Murrow Award, and the 2018 Immigration Journalism Prize from the French-American Foundation. He was a finalist three times for a Livingston Award, and was a 2021 Emerson Fellow at New America. In 2018, he received the Media Leadership Award from the American Immigration Lawyers Association.

His 2024 book Everyone Who Is Gone Is Here: The United States, Central America, and the Making of a Crisis chronicled the involvement of migrants from the Northern Triangle of Central America in the ongoing Mexico–United States border crisis. The book was named a New York Times Top 10 Book of 2024.

In addition to The New Yorker, Blitzer's work has appeared in The New York Times, The Atlantic, The Oxford American, and The Nation.
