= Peter F. Egan =

American politician

Peter Egan, Sr.

Member of the Louisiana House of Representatives from the 74th district
- Incumbent
- Assumed office January 8, 2024
- Preceded by: Larry Frieman

Personal details
- Born: Ballygar, County Galway, Ireland
- Party: Republican
- Education: MS)
- Occupation: Healthcare Owner & Administrator

Peter F. Egan, Sr. is an American politician serving as a member of the Louisiana House of Representatives from the 74th district. A member of the Republican Party, Egan represents St. Tammany Parish and has been in office since January 8, 2024.
