= Freedom Caucus =

Republican US congressional caucus

- Chair: Andy Harris (MD–1)
- Founded: January 26, 2015; 11 years ago
- Split from: Republican Study Committee
- Preceded by: Tea Party Caucus (de facto)
- Ideology: American nationalism; National conservatism; Right-wing populism; Trumpism; Factions: Paleoconservatism; Right-libertarianism
- Political position: Right-wing to far-right
- National affiliation: Republican Party
- Seats in the House Republican Conference: 31 / 219
- Seats in the House: 31 / 435

Website
- freedomcaucus.org

The Freedom Caucus, also known as the House Freedom Caucus, is a congressional caucus of conservative members of the Republican Party in the United States House of Representatives. It is generally considered to be the most conservative bloc within the chamber.

Formed in January 2015 by a number of conservative lawmakers, including several associated with the Tea Party movement, the caucus was created to advocate for a more conservative policy agenda and press Republican leadership to the right. Its first chairman was Jim Jordan, and its current chairman is Andy Harris. Members typically support policies associated with fiscal and social conservatism, including lower federal spending, limited government, and rigorous immigration oversight.

Over time, the caucus has been associated with right-wing populist and national conservatism, particularly during the presidencies of Donald Trump. It has also included some libertarians. The Freedom Caucus has often taken an assertive role in internal House politics, sometimes opposing legislation supported by Republican leadership or using procedural tools to influence the legislative process. Members of the caucus played a role in the removal of Kevin McCarthy as Speaker of the House. Members have also supported efforts to repeal the Affordable Care Act and have advocated for changes to House rules to decentralize power.

The caucus supports House candidates through its PAC, the House Freedom Fund.

== History ==
The caucus originated during the mid–January 2015 Republican congressional retreat in Hershey, Pennsylvania. Nine conservative Republican members of the House began planning a new congressional caucus separate from the Republican Study Committee and apart from the House Republican Conference. The founding members who constituted the first board of directors for the new caucus were Republican representatives Scott Garrett of New Jersey, Jim Jordan of Ohio, John Fleming of Louisiana, Matt Salmon of Arizona, Justin Amash of Michigan, Raúl Labrador of Idaho, Mick Mulvaney of South Carolina, Ron DeSantis of Florida and Mark Meadows of North Carolina.

At the retreat in Pennsylvania, the group settled on the name Freedom Caucus. Mick Mulvaney told Ryan Lizza of the New Yorker, "We had twenty names, and all of them were terrible. None of us liked the Freedom Caucus, either, but it was so generic and so universally awful that we had no reason to be against it." According to Lizza, "one of the working titles for the group was the Reasonable Nutjob Caucus."

During the crisis over funding for the Department of Homeland Security in early 2015, the caucus offered four plans to resolve it, which the Republican leadership rejected. One of the caucus leaders, Raúl Labrador, said the caucus would offer an alternative that the most conservative Republican members could support.

=== Opposition to Speaker of the House John Boehner ===
The caucus declared that a criterion for new members would be opposition to John Boehner as Speaker of the House and a willingness to oppose him on designated legislation.

The House Freedom Caucus was involved in Boehner's resignation on September 25, 2015, and the ensuing leadership battle for the new speaker. Members of the caucus who voted against Boehner for speaker accused him of cutting them off from positions in the Republican Study Committee and depriving them of key committee assignments. Boehner found it increasingly difficult to manage the fierce opposition of these conservative Republicans. He sparred with them in 2013 over their willingness to shut down the government in pursuit of goals such as repealing the Affordable Care Act. These Republicans later formed and joined the Freedom Caucus in 2015.

After Boehner resigned as speaker, Kevin McCarthy, the House majority leader, was initially the lead contender to succeed him, but the Freedom Caucus withheld its support. However, McCarthy withdrew from the race on October 8, 2015, after appearing to suggest that the Benghazi investigations' purpose had been to lower the approval ratings of Hillary Clinton. On the same day as McCarthy's withdrawal, Reid Ribble resigned from the Freedom Caucus saying he had joined to promote certain policies and could not support the role that it was playing in the leadership race.

On October 20, 2015, Paul Ryan announced that his bid for the speaker of the United States House of Representatives was contingent on an official endorsement by the Freedom Caucus. While the group could not reach the 80% approval that was needed to give an official endorsement, on October 21, 2015, it announced that it had reached a supermajority support for Ryan. On October 29, 2015, Ryan succeeded Boehner as the speaker of the House.

On October 30, 2017, Vanity Fair published an interview with Boehner, who said of the Freedom Caucus: "They can't tell you what they're for. They can tell you everything they're against. They're anarchists. They want total chaos. Tear it all down and start over. That's where their mindset is."

=== Backlash in 2016 ===
The group faced backlash from the Republican Party establishment during the 2016 election cycle. One of its members, Representative Tim Huelskamp, a Tea Party Republican representing Kansas's first district, was defeated during a primary election on August 2, 2016, by Roger Marshall.

=== 2017–2021: First Trump presidency ===
Following the election of Donald Trump, Mulvaney said, "Trump wants to turn Washington upside down – that was his first message and his winning message. We want the exact same thing. To the extent that he's got to convince Republicans to change Washington, we're there to help him ... and I think that makes us Donald Trump's best allies in the House." Freedom Caucus vice chair Jim Jordan said that during the Trump administration, the Freedom Caucus shifted focus from passing legislation to defending the President.

==== Rejection of the American Health Care Act in 2017 ====
On March 24, 2017, the American Health Care Act (AHCA), the House Republican bill to repeal and replace the Affordable Care Act, was withdrawn by Republican House Speaker Paul Ryan because it lacked the votes to pass, due in large part to opposition from Freedom Caucus Republicans who believed that the replacement provisions had the effect of failing to repeal some elements of the original Affordable Care Act.

Two days later, President Trump publicly criticized the Freedom Caucus and other right-wing groups, such as the Club for Growth and Heritage Action, that opposed the bill. Trump tweeted: "Democrats are smiling in D.C. that the Freedom Caucus, with the help of Club For Growth and Heritage, have saved Planned Parenthood & Obamacare!" On the same day, Representative Ted Poe of Texas resigned from the Freedom Caucus. On March 30, 2017, Trump "declared war" on the Freedom Caucus, sending a tweet urging Republicans to "fight them" in the 2018 midterm elections "if they don't get on the team" (i.e., support Trump's proposals). Vocal Freedom Caucus member Justin Amash responded by accusing Trump of "succumb[ing] to the D.C. Establishment."

Trump later developed a closer relationship with the caucus chair, Mark Meadows. In April 2018, Trump described three caucus members – Meadows, Jim Jordan, and Ron DeSantis – as "absolute warriors" for his defense during the course of the Special Counsel investigation.

==== During the first impeachment of Trump ====
In May 2019, the Freedom Caucus officially condemned one of its founding members, Justin Amash, after he called for the impeachment of President Trump over the Trump–Ukraine scandal. Amash, an outspoken libertarian, announced in June 2019 that he had left the caucus; later the same year, he left the Republican Party and joined the Libertarian Party.

During the Trump impeachment inquiry and the subsequent impeachment, the caucus emerged as a defender of the President.

==== Meadows's appointment as WH chief of staff and criticism of Liz Cheney ====
In March 2020, former Freedom Caucus chair Mark Meadows was appointed as White House chief of staff, replacing fellow caucus member Mick Mulvaney.

Freedom Caucus members called on Liz Cheney to resign as Chair of the House Republican Conference, because of her criticism of Trump's foreign policy, response to the COVID-19 pandemic, and use of social media, leading to her firing May 12, 2021, and replacement by Elise Stefanik two days later.

==== 2020 National Defense Authorization Act ====
In December 2020, the caucus sided with Donald Trump and opposed the NDAA because it did not include a provision to repeal Section 230.

=== 2021–2023: 117th Congress and embrace of populism ===
==== Role in attempting to overturn the 2020 election and opposition to the second Trump impeachment ====
After Trump lost his bid for reelection in November 2020, many members of the Freedom Caucus supported Trump's attempt to overturn the election results. In early December 2020, amid pressure from Trump on congressional Republicans to help him subvert the election outcome, two dozen House Republicans, including many Freedom Caucus members, sent a letter to Trump asking him to order his Attorney General, William P. Barr, to appoint a Justice Department special counsel to investigate supposed election "irregularities", even though Barr had previously acknowledged that there was no evidence justifying such a step. Several Freedom Caucus members met with officials at Trump's White House in December 2020, discussing ways to overturn the election results during the 2021 United States Electoral College vote count. Most Freedom Caucus members objected to the counting of the electoral votes that formalized Trump's defeat.

During the second impeachment of Donald Trump for incitement of insurrection, Freedom Caucus leadership and members demanded that Representative Liz Cheney, one of 10 Republicans who voted in favor of impeachment, resign from her role as chairwoman of the House Republican Conference.

==== America First Caucus and MAGA Squad ====
In April 2021, a faction within the Freedom Caucus, led by Paul Gosar and Marjorie Taylor Greene, attempted to form a new splinter group called the "America First Caucus," along with Matt Gaetz. Senior members of the Freedom Caucus reportedly reacted with "fury" to the proposal, with Ken Buck publicly denouncing it. The new caucus was later scrapped.

An unofficial faction of Trump loyalists, sometimes referred to as the 'MAGA Squad', included Gosar, Greene, Gaetz, Madison Cawthorn, Louie Gohmert, Mo Brooks, Andy Biggs, Scott Perry, and Lauren Boebert. Described as more radical than the mainstream Freedom Caucus, the group supported primary challenges against incumbent Republicans during the 2022 United States House of Representatives elections.

==== Respect for Marriage Act ====
In July 2022, the caucus confronted the Respect for Marriage Act, which recognized a statutory right to same-sex marriage. All caucus members voted against, except Chairperson Scott Perry (R-PA), who joined 46 other Republicans and all Democrats in voting for the bill. The Freedom Caucus adopted a formal position urging Senate Republicans to block the bill, and Perry later voted against its final passage. To take a formal position on legislation, the Freedom Caucus requires the support of 80% of the caucus's members.

=== 2023–2024: 118th Congress and House leadership conflict ===
In the November 2022 elections, Republicans narrowly regained control of the House of Representatives for the 118th Congress.

In December 2022, seven hardline Republicans, including Freedom Caucus Chair Scott Perry and several other caucus members, sent a letter outlining demands for the next Speaker. Many echoed earlier requests made that summer, such as increasing Freedom Caucus representation on key committees, including the House Rules Committee and chairmanships; allowing any amendment to receive a vote if backed by at least ten percent of the Republican conference; prohibiting House Republican leaders and affiliated PACs from interfering in primaries; reinstating the motion to vacate the chair; and codifying the Hastert Rule, which bars legislation from advancing without support from a majority of House Republicans.

==== 2023 House leadership election ====
The Freedom Caucus was actively involved in the ensuing House Republican leadership elections. Still, it was divided over whether to challenge House Minority Leader Kevin McCarthy's bid to be Speaker of the House of Representatives. Former caucus chair Andy Biggs launched an unsuccessful challenge to McCarthy, losing 31-188 in a secret ballot vote, with five Republicans writing in other names. McCarthy ran with the endorsement of other Freedom Caucus members, such as vice chair Jim Jordan, David Schweikert, and Marjorie Taylor Greene. Caucus member Byron Donalds also ran for House Republican Conference chair, but lost to incumbent Elise Stefanik, while member Andrew Clyde ran for House Republican Conference secretary, but lost to Lisa McClain.

McCarthy needed 218 votes from the House floor to be elected speaker in the January 3, 2023, vote. After McCarthy won the internal Republican nomination, some Freedom Caucus members outspokenly supported him, including Jordan, a former McCarthy rival who was set to be chairperson of the House Judiciary Committee. Marjorie Taylor Greene also backed McCarthy, saying that any alternative to McCarthy would be insufficiently right-wing. Other caucus members resisted supporting McCarthy, with five members saying they would vote against him, although they have not coalesced around a specific alternative candidate. A third group of caucus members did not publicly support or oppose McCarthy's speakership bid, seeking to extract concessions from him. Because the House Republicans only had a narrow majority (222–212), McCarthy could not gain a majority unless nearly all Republicans voted for him. McCarthy warned his internal opponents that the next speaker of the House could be chosen with House Democratic votes if the Republican caucus failed to unite around him. In January 2023, 19 Freedom Caucus members voted against McCarthy during the House floor vote for Speaker, eventually allowing McCarthy to become Speaker only after securing extensive concessions on changing the House rules.

==== 2023 conflict with Marjorie Taylor Greene ====
On June 21, 2023, Greene engaged in a verbal argument with fellow caucus member Lauren Boebert on the House floor, in which she called the latter a "little bitch." As a result of this incident, the caucus voted by secret ballot to expel Greene.

==== 2023 debt-ceiling crisis and aftermath ====
In May 2023, Speaker McCarthy worked with the Biden administration to pass a compromise debt-ceiling reform and spending bill, with the Freedom Caucus supporting the bills as part of the compromise that got McCarthy elected speaker. By suspending the debt ceiling until January 2025, the government avoided a default. The spending bill focused on issues such as military construction and veterans affairs.

On May 31, during a procedural rule vote on the bill to end the debt ceiling crisis, 29 Freedom Caucus-aligned Republicans voted against the rule. Rules are historically supported by all members of the majority party and opposed by minority members regardless of their feelings on the underlying bill. To ensure the bill's passage, Democratic Leader Hakeem Jeffries held up a green card to signal that Democrats could vote in favor of the measure, prompting 52 Democrats to show their support for the procedural vote. A majority of both the Republican and Democratic parties voted for the Fiscal Responsibility Act of 2023, but more Republicans (71) voted against the bill than Democrats (46).

Following the passage of the Fiscal Responsibility Act, 11 members of the Freedom Caucus voted with Democrats to block a procedural rules vote on a Republican bill that would hinder the federal government's ability to regulate gas stoves. Freedom Caucus members said the vote was a protest of McCarthy's handling of the debt-ceiling crisis. On June 12, 2023, the Freedom Caucus and McCarthy reached an agreement that resulted in the Freedom Caucus not blocking procedural votes in exchange for conservative legislation being brought to the floor.

==== Removal of Kevin McCarthy as speaker ====
Despite the earlier agreement, Freedom Caucus members once again joined with Democrats in September 2023 to block procedural rule votes. On September 19 and September 21, five members of the Freedom Caucus voted with Democrats to block a vote on a military funding bill. The Freedom Caucus was angry about a proposed continuing resolution to avert a government shutdown, arguing it did not do enough to cut spending. On September 29, twenty-one Freedom Caucus members joined with Democrats to block a continuing resolution which included spending cuts and immigration restrictions. Freedom Caucus members who voted against the resolution said they would not support a temporary spending bill under any circumstances.

Because of this conflict, the federal government appeared poised to shut down. The Freedom Caucus threatened to depose McCarthy if he turned to Democrats to gather more votes. On September 29, Politico reported that Representative Matt Gaetz had reached out to Congressional Progressive Caucus chair Pramila Jayapal, among other Democrats about removing McCarthy. The following day, hours before a shutdown was expected to occur, the House of Representatives passed a bipartisan continuing resolution to fund the government through November 17. The resolution was passed in the Senate and signed by President Joe Biden, averting a shutdown. Representative Matt Gaetz, who had led resistance to McCarthy, announced in an interview with CNN that he would move to remove McCarthy for working with Democrats.

On October 2, Gaetz filed a motion to vacate, forcing a vote on McCarthy's removal within two legislative days. Voting began the following day; McCarthy ruled out a deal with Democrats. Representative Tom Cole unsuccessfully moved to table the motion. The House proceeded with a successful vote to vacate on a 216–210 vote, the first time in congressional history that the chair was vacated. Eventually, the Republican conference unanimously elected Mike Johnson Speaker of the House.

==== Conflict with Speaker Johnson ====
To avert another government shutdown, Mike Johnson invoked a suspension of the rules to pass a continuing resolution on November 14, 2023. 93 Republicans and 2 Democrats voted against the resolution. The continuing resolution once again angered Freedom Caucus members. On November 15, 19 Freedom Caucus members joined with Democrats to block a rule vote on a bill funding the Justice Department.

On January 7, 2024, Senate Majority Leader Chuck Schumer and House Speaker Johnson agreed to a $1.59 trillion topline spending deal. The topline spending levels agreed to for 2024 were not substantially different from those in the deal McCarthy and President Biden had negotiated. The agreement was met by outrage by the House Freedom Caucus, essentially ensuring Democrats would be required to join Republicans to pass a finalized spending bill in the House. On January 10, twelve Freedom Caucus members joined Democrats to block a rule vote on an unrelated bill about electric cars in protest of the spending deal.

With the House Freedom Caucus' determination to also oppose rules on any bill they did not support, Speaker Johnson relied on suspension of rules: this special procedure allowed the immediate passage of a legislative proposal without the need for a rule vote, but required the support of two-thirds of the House. Democrats voted in favor of suspending the rules for budget legislation.

On April 20, over two months after the Senate had passed a funding bill for Israel, Taiwan, and Ukraine, Jeffries negotiated the legislative path for the bill and delivered a majority of Democratic votes to pass a legislative package providing aid to the three countries in separate bills, each of which passed Congress with bipartisan support and large majorities and was signed into law by President Biden. The bill was voted against in committee by three Freedom Caucus members – enough to prevent it from progressing under normal circumstances – but all Democrats voted for it.

As the House continued to pass a series of key legislative victories supported by a majority of Democrats, Freedom Caucus-aligned Republicans threatened to trigger another motion to vacate the chair, this time targeting Speaker Johnson. However, Jeffries hinted at providing a lifeline to Speaker Mike Johnson in an interview with The New York Times.

The House voted to table (kill) the motion by a vote of 359-43, allowing Johnson to remain speaker. 196 Republicans and 163 Democrats voted to table the motion; 11 Republicans and 32 Democrats voted against tabling the motion. The Democrats who supported Johnson claimed they did so because of the vital role he had played in providing funding for the federal government and for Ukraine.

==== 2024 elections ====
The chair of the Freedom Caucus, Bob Good, faced backlash for voting to remove Kevin McCarthy and endorsing Ron DeSantis in the 2024 Republican Party presidential primaries. The leadership positions held by Good and Chip Roy in the Caucus led to a rift between the Freedom Caucus and Trump. Good was ultimately defeated in a 2024 primary challenge from state senator John McGuire, who was endorsed by Donald Trump. Warren Davidson's support for McGuire led to his expulsion from the caucus, with Troy Nehls subsequently resigning from the caucus in support of Davidson. McGuire won by a margin of 0.6%, with Good seeking a recount. Good said he would resign as chair if he lost the recount, which he subsequently did lose. Good stepped down as chair in September, when the House was back in session.

Andy Harris was chosen as the new chair of the Freedom Caucus for the rest of 2024. The Freedom Caucus supported the nomination of JD Vance as Trump's vice presidential candidate in the 2024 U.S. presidential election.

=== 2025–present: 119th Congress and Second Trump Presidency ===
==== 119th Congress House Republican leadership elections (2025) ====
Republicans voted to nominate their speaker of the House candidate on Wednesday, November 13. Before the vote, members of the Freedom Caucus and the Main Street Caucus, along with speaker Mike Johnson, reached an agreement: the proposed rule changes on Conference assignments would be withdrawn; in exchange, the holdouts pledged to support a reform of the motion to vacate, which would raise the threshold to introduce it from one member to nine members. After the deal was struck, Johnson was nominated by voice vote without opposition.

Following Speaker Johnson's December 17 announcement of a continuing resolution to avert a government shutdown, which included funding opposed by many conservative Republicans, Republican representative Thomas Massie said he would vote against Johnson in the upcoming speakership election. Politico and Punchbowl News reported that, privately, several other Republicans were "uncommitted" to supporting Johnson. Later, Republican senators Rand Paul and Mike Lee, as well as Republican representative Marjorie Taylor Greene, publicly announced that they are open to supporting Elon Musk to be the next Speaker of the House. On December 20, Freedom Caucus chair Andy Harris said he was "undecided." On December 30, 2024, President-elect Donald Trump endorsed Johnson through a post on Truth Social. Despite the endorsement, multiple Republican representatives have publicly said they are uncommitted to voting for Johnson; including Victoria Spartz, (Note: Despite being a member of the Republican Party, Spartz is not part of the House Republican Conference.) Andy Biggs, Tim Burchett, and Chip Roy. Roy also said that "Johnson does not yet have the support to be speaker."

Initially, during the Speaker vote, Republican Representatives Thomas Massie voted for Tom Emmer, Ralph Norman voted for Jim Jordan, and Keith Self voted for Byron Donalds; Republicans Andy Biggs, Michael Cloud, Andrew Clyde, Paul Gosar, Andy Harris, and Chip Roy (all of whom were undecided going into the vote) did not respond to the initial roll call vote. The clerk then called a second time the names of those who had not replied to the first call, and all six voted for Johnson. Johnson's vote count therefore stood at 216, two short of the required majority. However, after meeting with Johnson off the floor and receiving a phone call from Trump, Norman and Self shifted their support to Johnson before the final vote was declared.

==== Resignation of Anna Paulina Luna ====
In March 2025, Freedom Caucus member Anna Paulina Luna worked with Democrats and some Republicans to force a vote on a bill through a discharge petition, which would allow new parents to vote by proxy. The petition angered members of the Freedom Caucus, who believe proxy voting is unconstitutional, prompting them to vote against procedural rules on Republican-supported energy bills. After negotiations with House Republican leadership, the Freedom Caucus would later allow the vote to pass. Freedom Caucus leadership urged Republican leadership to raise the threshold required to force a vote on a bill through a discharge petition. Paulina Luna would later resign from the Freedom Caucus. In a letter, she said her decision to resign was due to the loss of "mutual respect that has guided our caucus." On April 1, Republican leadership attempted to pass a rule vote that would prevent Luna's bill from being voted on. Nine Republicans (Luna, Tim Burchett, Mike Lawler, Kevin Kiley, Nick LaLota, Jeff Van Drew, Max Miller, Greg Steube and Ryan Mackenzie) joined all Democrats to block the rule vote. Afterwards, Freedom Caucus hard-liners said they would vote against any rule that did not include language preventing the proxy voting bill from coming to a vote. In response, Speaker Johnson suspended voting for the remainder of that week. On April 6, Paulina Luna and Johnson reached an agreement that would allow absent members to use vote pairing. Their intended vote will still be published in the Congressional Record.

==== "House Folding Caucus" ====
Similar to previous Congresses, during several high-profile votes in the House, Freedom Caucus members withheld their votes. Often, these members argued that bills weren't sufficiently conservative. However, unlike previous years, Freedom Caucus members voted for these bills despite Republican leadership offering few or no concessions to Freedom Caucus holdouts. As a result, some critics in 2025, such as Democratic Pennsylvania congressman Brendan Boyle, nicknamed the Freedom Caucus during this period the "House Folding Caucus".

==== 2026 midterm elections ====
Many Freedom Caucus members are not standing for re-election in the 2026 United States House of Representatives elections. Those members include Chip Roy, Barry Moore, Ralph Norman, Andy Biggs, Byron Donalds and Tom Tiffany.

== Political positions ==
The caucus is positioned right-wing to far-right on the political spectrum. On October 30, 2017, Vanity Fair published an interview with John Boehner, who said of the Freedom Caucus: "They can't tell you what they're for. They can tell you everything they're against. They're anarchists. They want total chaos. Tear it all down and start over. That's where their mindset is."

After the 2016 presidential election of Donald Trump, the Freedom Caucus shifted its emphasis to loyalty to Trump, and became what Politico described as "more populist and nationalist, but less bound by policy principles." The caucus has included some members who are libertarians.

== Leadership ==
The current chair of the caucus is Representative Andy Harris from Maryland, with Representative Jim Jordan as the deputy chair. In January 2022, Representative Lauren Boebert was elected communications chair, and Representative Chip Roy was elected policy chair.

Name	Start	End	District	Duration	Ref.
Jim Jordan	February 11, 2015	January 3, 2017	OH-04	1 year, 327 days	
Mark Meadows	January 3, 2017	October 1, 2019	NC-11	2 years, 271 days	
Andy Biggs	October 1, 2019	January 1, 2022	AZ-05	2 years, 92 days	
Scott Perry	January 1, 2022	January 1, 2024	PA-10	2 years, 0 days	
Bob Good	January 1, 2024	September 17, 2024	VA-05	260 days	
Andy Harris	September 17, 2024	Incumbent	MD-01	2 years, 65 days	

== Membership ==
Map of the districts of current members of the House Freedom Caucus.

=== Membership policy ===
The House Freedom Caucus historically did not disclose its members' names, and membership was by invitation only. The New York Times wrote in October 2015 that the caucus usually meets "in the basement of a local pub rather than at the Capitol." The caucus acts as a bloc, with decisions that are supported by 80 percent made binding on all of its members, which has strengthened its influence among House Republicans. As of 2026, the caucus and its affiliated political action committee publish a list of members and endorsed candidates on their official websites.

=== Electoral results ===
Historically, the House Freedom Caucus did not publicly publish a full membership list, and membership figures were compiled from reliable reporting. The known number of members at the start of each electoral cycle is listed below.

Starting membership in election cycles
Election year	Republican seats	±	%
2016	28 / 241	New	11.6%
2018	29 / 199	▲1	14.6%
2020	44 / 213	▲15	20.7%
2022	45 / 222	▲1	20.3%
2024	35 / 220	▼10	15.9%
2026	24 / 176	▼11	13.6%

=== Current members ===
The Freedom Caucus publishes a membership map on its official website and lists endorsements from its fund. As of July 2026 there are 31 caucus members:

State	District	CPVI	Member	Notes
Alabama	AL-01	R+17	Barry Moore	Elected U.S. Senator in 2026
Alaska	AK-AL	R+6	Nick Begich III	
Arizona	AZ-02	R+7	Eli Crane	
Arizona	AZ-05	R+10	Andy Biggs	Ran for governor of Arizona in 2026 and lost
Arizona	AZ-05	R+10	Mark Lamb	Representative-elect
Arizona	AZ-09	R+15	Paul Gosar	
Colorado	CO-04	R+9	Lauren Boebert	Communications Chair (lost reelection in 2026)
Florida	FL-06	R+14	Randy Fine	
Florida	FL-19	R+14	Byron Donalds	Elected governor of Florida in 2026
Georgia	GA-09	R+17	Andrew Clyde	
Idaho	ID-01	R+22	Russ Fulcher	
Illinois	IL-15	R+20	Mary Miller	
Indiana	IN-03	R+16	Marlin Stutzman	
Louisiana	LA-03	R+18	Clay Higgins	
Maryland	MD-01	R+8	Andy Harris	Chair
Missouri	MO-07	R+21	Eric Burlison	
North Carolina	NC-08	R+10	Mark Harris	
Ohio	OH-04	R+21	Jim Jordan	Vice chair, slated to be Minority Leader of the 120th United States Congress
Oklahoma	OK-02	R+28	Josh Brecheen	
Pennsylvania	PA-10	R+3	Scott Perry	(lost reelection in 2026)
South Carolina	SC-03	R+21	Sheri Biggs	
South Carolina	SC-05	R+11	Ralph Norman	Unsuccessfully ran for both governor and senator of South Carolina in 2026
Tennessee	TN-01	R+29	Diana Harshbarger	
Tennessee	TN-04	R+11	Scott DesJarlais	(lost reelection in 2026)
Tennessee	TN-05	R+10	Andy Ogles	Lost renomination
Texas	TX-02	R+11	Steve Toth	Representative-elect
Texas	TX-03	R+11	Keith Self	
Texas	TX-21	R+10	Chip Roy	Ran for attorney general in Texas in 2026 and lost
Texas	TX-26	R+11	Brandon Gill	
Texas	TX-27	R+10	Michael Cloud	
Texas	TX-32	R+8	Jace Yarbrough	Representative-elect
Virginia	VA-06	R+12	Ben Cline	
Virginia	VA-09	R+22	Morgan Griffith	
Wisconsin	WI-07	R+11	Tom Tiffany	Ran for governor of Wisconsin in 2026 and lost

=== Former members ===
Before 2026, the House Freedom Caucus did not publicly disclose the names of its members, membership was by invitation only, and its meetings were not made public. Thus, there may have been more members than reported.

==== Left caucus ====
- Justin Amash of Michigan (in 2019)
- Brian Babin of Texas (in 2017)
- Harriet Hageman of Wyoming (denied membership in 2024)
- Doug Lamborn of Colorado (in 2016)
- Barry Loudermilk of Georgia (declined to renew membership for the 115th Congress)
- Anna Paulina Luna of Florida (in 2025)
- Tom McClintock of California (in 2015)
- Troy Nehls of Texas (in 2024)
- Ted Poe of Texas (in 2017)
- Reid Ribble of Wisconsin (in 2015)
- Keith Rothfus of Pennsylvania (in 2016)
- David Schweikert of Arizona (in 2023)

==== Removed from caucus ====
- Ken Buck of Colorado (voted out of caucus days before he resigned from the House in 2024)
- Warren Davidson of Ohio (removed from the caucus in 2024)
- Marjorie Taylor Greene of Georgia (removed from the caucus in 2023)
- Randy Weber of Texas (removed from the caucus in 2024)

==== Lost renomination or re-election ====
- Rod Blum of Iowa (lost 2018 general election)
- Dave Brat of Virginia (lost 2018 general election)
- Madison Cawthorn of North Carolina (lost renomination in 2022 primary election)
- Scott Garrett of New Jersey (lost 2016 general election)
- Bob Good of Virginia – Former Chair (lost renomination in 2024 primary election)
- Tim Huelskamp of Kansas (lost renomination in 2016 primary election)
- Yvette Herrell of New Mexico (lost 2022 general election)
- Andy Ogles of Tennessee (lost renomination in 2026 primary election)
- Denver Riggleman of Virginia (defeated for renomination in 2020 primary election)
- Dana Rohrabacher of California (lost 2018 general election)
- Mark Sanford of South Carolina (defeated for renomination in 2018 primary election)

==== Retired or died ====
- Joe Barton of Texas (retired in 2018)
- Dan Bishop of North Carolina (retired in 2024 to unsuccessfully run for North Carolina Attorney General)
- Jim Bridenstine of Oklahoma (resigned in 2018 to become NASA Administrator)
- Mo Brooks of Alabama (retired and lost 2022 election for senator from Alabama)
- Ted Budd of North Carolina (retired and won 2022 election for senator from North Carolina)
- Curt Clawson of Florida (retired in 2016)
- Ron DeSantis of Florida (retired in 2018 and won election for governor of Florida)
- Jeff Duncan (SC-3) (retired in 2025)
- John Fleming of Louisiana (retired in 2016 and lost nomination as Senator from Louisiana)
- Tom Garrett of Virginia (retired in 2018)
- Louie Gohmert of Texas (retired and lost 2022 nomination as Attorney General of Texas)
- Mark Green of Tennessee (retired in 2025)
- Jody Hice of Georgia (retired and lost 2022 election for Georgia Secretary of State)
- Fred Keller of Pennsylvania (retired in 2022)
- Raúl Labrador of Idaho (retired and lost 2018 nomination as Governor of Idaho)
- Debbie Lesko of Arizona (retired in 2024 to successfully run for Maricopa County Board of Supervisors)
- Cynthia Lummis of Wyoming (retired in 2016)
- Mark Meadows of North Carolina (resigned in 2020 to become White House Chief of Staff)
- Alex Mooney (WV-2) (retired in 2024 and lost nomination as Senator from West Virginia)
- Mick Mulvaney of South Carolina (resigned in 2017 to become OMB Director)
- Devin Nunes of California (resigned in 2022 to become CEO of TMTG)
- Steve Pearce of New Mexico (retired and lost 2018 election for Governor of New Mexico)
- Bill Posey (FL-8) (retired in 2025)
- Matt Rosendale of Montana (retired in 2024)
- Matt Salmon of Arizona (retired in 2016)
- Ron Wright of Texas (died in 2021)
- Ted Yoho of Florida (retired in 2020)

== Affiliate organizations ==
Freedom Caucus Fund
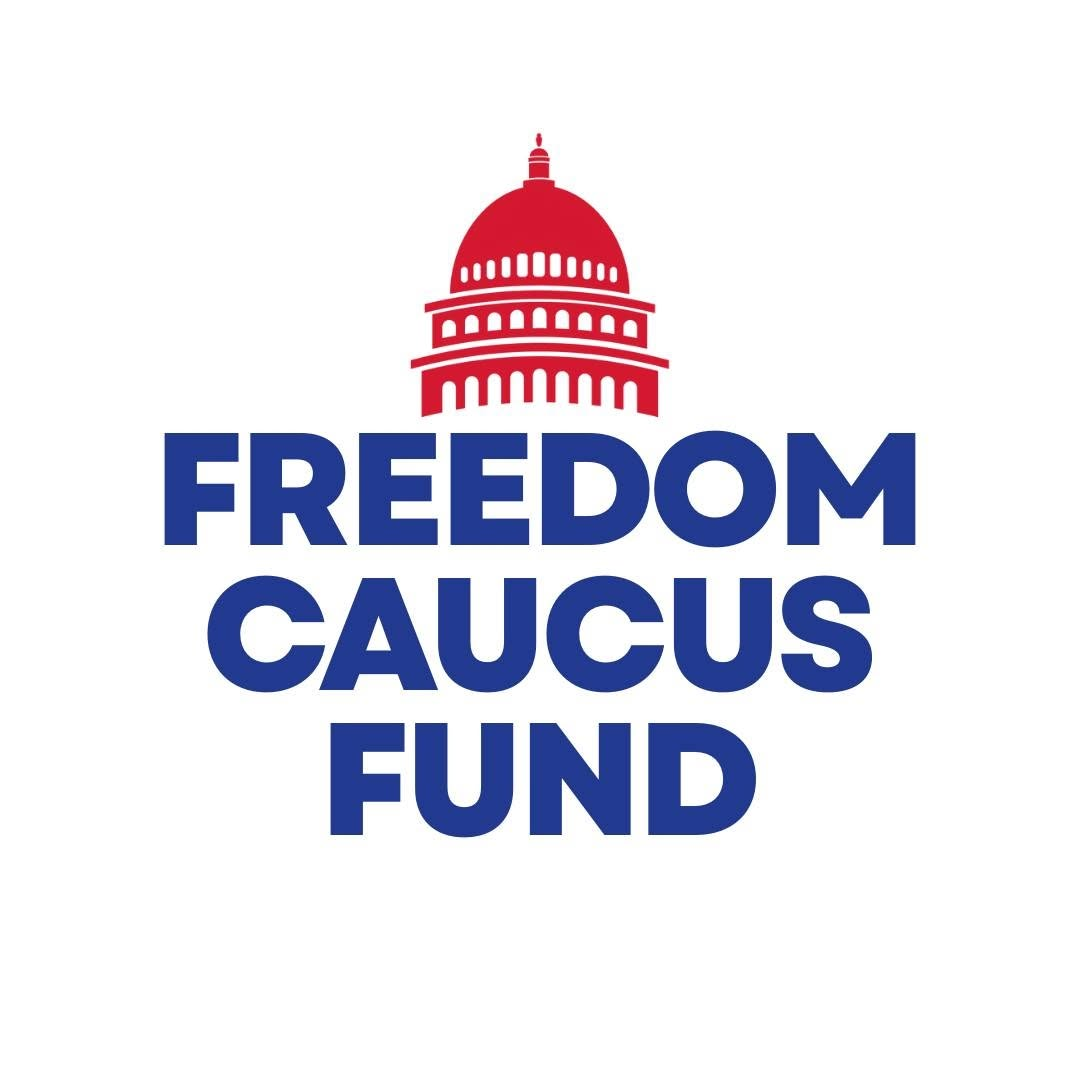
- Abbreviation: FCF
- Founded: December 5, 2013; 12 years ago
- Type: Hybrid PAC
- Registration no.: C00552851
- Headquarters: Washington D.C., U.S.
- Key people: Megan Brown, Treasurer
- Revenue: $5.80 million (2026)
- Disbursements: $5.76 million
- Website: freedomcaucusfund.com

The Freedom Caucus Fund (FCF) is the hybrid PAC affiliated with the Freedom Caucus. The fund was formed in 2026 after the merging of House Freedom Fund (HFF) and House Freedom Action (HFA). The HFF was a political action committee dedicated to supporting and endorsing candidates, while the HFA was a super PAC focused on advertising. The fund supports incumbent caucus members and endorses prospective new members.

The separate Freedom Caucus Foundation serves as a nonprofit organization that promotes the caucus's policy goals through public outreach and media campaigns. The foundation has aired television ads highlighting the legislative activities of the affiliated caucus, including its role in shaping the 2025 budget negotiations.

The similarly named State Freedom Caucus Network, an offshoot of the Conservative Partnership Institute, is not officially affiliated with the House Freedom Caucus.

=== 2026 ===
The FCF endorsed all incumbent caucus members and seven prospective newcomers. Incumbent Andy Ogles lost renomination.

U.S. House prospects
Candidate	State	Office	Primary			General	
Candidate	State	Office	Date	Result	%	Result	%
Mark Lamb	Arizona	Arizona's 5th congressional district	July 21, 2026	Won	58.6%	Won	51.7%
Mike Beltran	Florida	Florida's 14th congressional district	August 18, 2026	Won	45.6%	Lost	45.9%
Catalina Lauf	Florida	Florida's 19th congressional district	August 18, 2026	Lost	22.0%	Did not qualify	N/A
David Flippo	Nevada	Nevada's 2nd congressional district	June 9, 2026	Won	46.9%	Lost	44.6%
Steve Toth	Texas	Texas's 2nd congressional district	March 23, 2026	Won	55.8%	Won	51.0%
Brandon Herrera	Texas	Texas's 23rd congressional district	March 23, 2026	Won	43.3%	Lost	44.0%
Jace Yarbrough	Texas	Texas's 32nd congressional district	March 23, 2026	Won	49.0%	Won	51.5%

Defeated incumbents
Candidate	State	Office	Election date	Result	%
Lauren Boebert	Colorado	Colorado's 4th congressional district	November 3, 2026	Lost reelection	47.9%
Scott Perry	Pennsylvania	Pennsylvania's 10th congressional district	November 3, 2026	Lost reelection	44.9%
Scott DesJarlais	Tennessee	Tennessee's 4th congressional district	November 3, 2026	Lost reelection	48.7%
Andy Ogles	Tennessee	Tennessee's 5th congressional district	August 6, 2026	Lost renomination	46.8%

== See also ==
- Blue Dog Coalition
- Caucuses of the United States Congress
- Factions in the Republican Party (United States)
- Liberty Caucus
- Republican Liberty Caucus
- Republican Main Street Partnership
- Second Amendment Caucus
- Sedition Caucus – American political term
- Tea Party Caucus
- Tuesday Group
