= Conservative Partnership Institute =

American political organization

Coordinates: 38°53′16″N 77°00′07″W

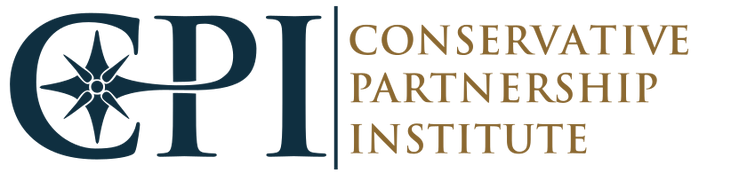

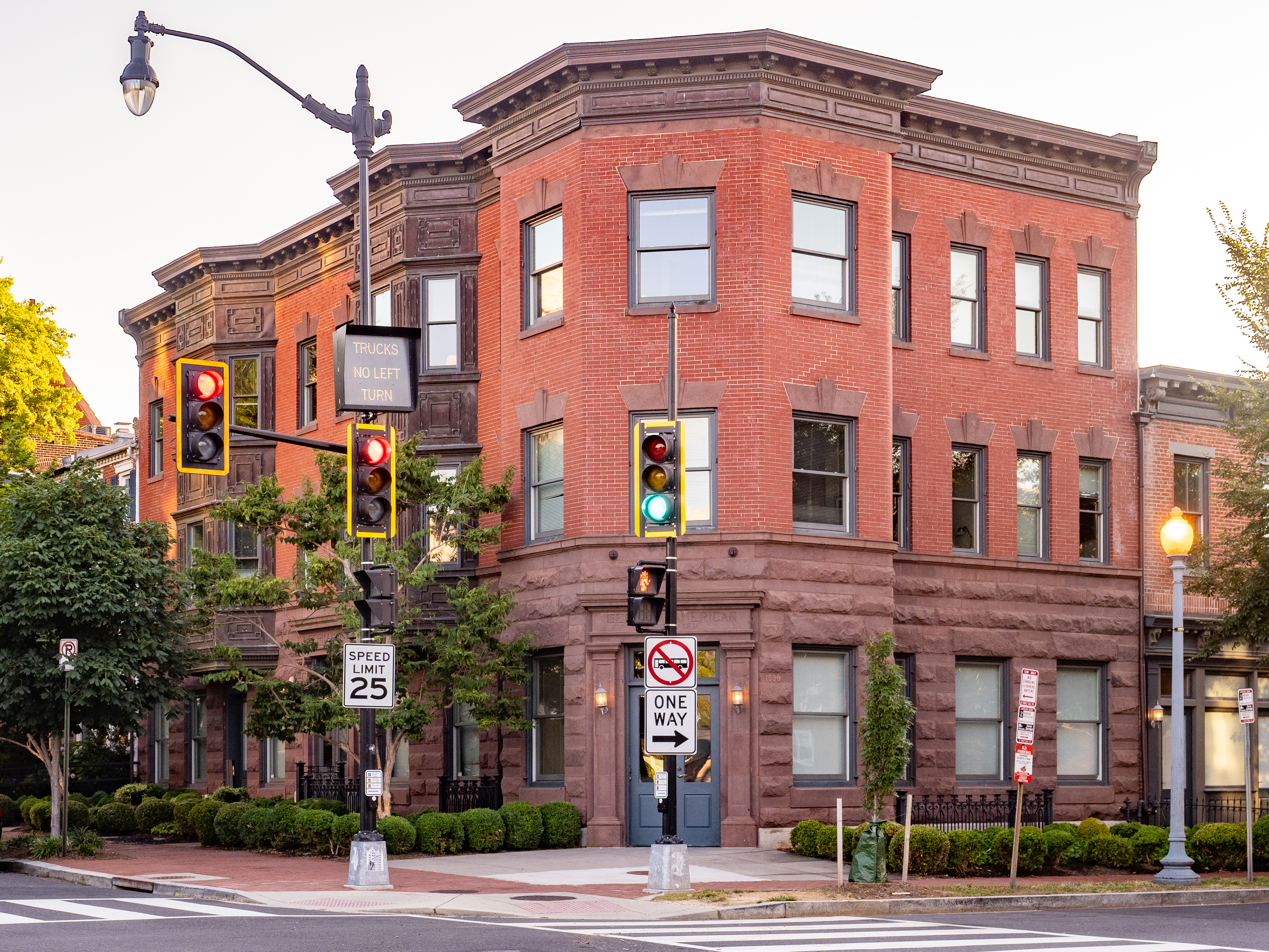
- CPI's headquarters in Washington, D.C. in 2024
- Abbreviation: CPI
- Formation: May 2017 (9 years ago)
- Founder: Jim DeMint
- Founded at: Washington, D.C., U.S.
- Type: nonprofit
- Tax ID no.: 82-1470217
- Legal status: 501(c)(3)
- Purpose: political education and advocacy
- Headquarters: Ste 200; 300 Independence Ave SE; Washington, DC 20003-1028; United States
- President: Edward Corrigan (Note: Corrigan president since May 2017)
- Chairman: Jim DeMint
- Key people: Mark Meadows (Note: since January 2021)
- Revenue: $45,707,730 (Note: IRS Form-990 yr2021) (2021)
- Expenses: $17,160,422 (2021)
- Website: cpi.org

The Conservative Partnership Institute (CPI) is a United States-based conservative 501(c)(3) political education and advocacy nonprofit organization. The stated purpose of CPI is the professional development of conservative staffers and elected officials. Under the leadership of Mark Meadows, since 2017 the nonprofit has grown sixfold to become the "nerve center" of the Make America Great Again movement, bolstering notable figures such as U.S. Representatives Marjorie Taylor Greene and Lauren Boebert, according to The Washington Post.

In 2024, journalist Jonathan Blitzer in The New Yorker called it a well-financed network of about two dozen right-wing organizations, the next Trump Administration "in waiting", and a "base of operations" for conservatives who not only target Democrats but other Republicans whom they believe to be insufficiently conservative. According to one supporter, the staff of the organization have "thought deeply about what’s needed to create the infrastructure and the resources for a more anti-establishment conservative movement”.

Planning for the protests of January 6, 2021, and the effort to reverse the results of the 2020 presidential election, were both centered at CPI's headquarters according to Jonathan Blitzer. The Guardian reported that the group has also held numerous "election integrity" summits in battleground states, advocating "election integrity", expanded poll watching, "clean" voter rolls, and other initiatives defenders say could favor Republican candidates.

== History ==
The Conservative Partnership Institute (CPI) was founded in 2017 by former U.S. Senator Jim DeMint, who serves as the organization's chairman. Mark Meadows, former chief of staff to then-president Donald Trump, joined as a senior partner in January 2021. Trump's Save America PAC donated $1 million to CPI.

DeMint started the group at a donors' retreat after being terminated from the Heritage Foundation. On their way back to Washington, D.C., he and his now unemployed associates came up with the idea of founding a new organization, that unlike Heritage would not be a think tank developing policy proposals, but instead focus on where their expertise lay, i.e. the workings of the US Congress. The Republican Party congressional leadership (DeMint's associates felt), always had an advantage of "better and more extensive staffing" over movement conservatives like themselves. By recruiting and training conservatives to become more effective, they could infiltrate conservatives into "the system" as staffers. This would turn out to be especially useful during the Trump administration, as early on many of the staff Trump hired were reluctant to follow orders they disagreed with, leading to enormous turnover. CPI saw a role for itself, as Trump's aides struggled to find replacements for all the executive agency vacancies. As one CPI member described it, administration staff (before CPI came to the rescue) tended to be either old school Republicans unsympathetic to Trump's policies and behavior, or "Trump-campaign supporters who could barely get their pants on in the morning.”

As of mid-2024, DeMint has reportedly become a "figurehead" at CPI, i.e. taken on a less active role, and Mark Meadows is primarily involved in fundraising. The Heritage Foundation has reconciled with CPI, hiring key figures in that organization, such as Russell Vought, Ed Corrigan, Stephen Miller, and Saurabh Sharma, to be part of Heritage's massive Project 2025—an indication of CPI's "mounting influence".

The CPI along with other organizations such as the Bull Moose Project, urged Trump in a letter to take antitrust actions against Google and Ticketmaster.

== Organization and projects ==
Unlike other conservative organizations, such as the Heritage Foundation and American Enterprise Institute, which both focus on public policy, CPI is "an incubator and an activist hub that funds other organizations, coördinates with conservative members of the House and Senate, and works as a counterweight to G.O.P. leadership".

Some of the conservative groups in its network include:

- America First Legal, headed by Stephen Miller, a public interest law firm that targets "woke corporations", public school districts, and the Biden administration
- American Accountability Foundation, an organization that investigates federal employees to find those who lack loyalty to Donald Trump by going through their personal profiles and social media posts
- American Moment, cultivates new conservative staffers in Washington, D.C.
- American Voting Rights Foundation, finances voting audits in Arizona
- Election Integrity Network, trains volunteers to monitor election polling locations and investigate low level election officials
- Personnel Policy Operations, provides legal funding for conservatives being prosecuted by the justice system, especially Jeffrey Clark and Mark Meadows; almost all its funding comes from CPI.
- State Freedom Caucus Network, helps state legislators establish state level replicas of the Freedom Caucus, a caucus in the U.S. House of Representatives.

CPI may share resources/services with these groups, such as discounted real estate, accounting (Compass Professional) and legal representation (Compass Legal), direct mail, studios for podcast recordings and videos. Their boards often have overlapping membership.

Holding weekly meetings at the CPI headquarters are the hard right House Freedom Caucus, and the conservative Senate Republican Steering Committee, headed by Mike Lee.

=== Cultural and legal support for Trump ===
According to Andrew Kloster, formerly of Compass Legal, one of CPI's goals is "de-risking public service on the right". This is made possible, according to Jonathan Blitzer of The New Yorker, by providing "an alternative, fully self-sufficient ecosystem" for anyone on the right who fears "financial ruin" and/or "pariah status" in Washington from taking "bold" action in the service of the Trump cause. Kloster's group, Courage Under Fire Legal Defense Fund, has spent approximately $3 million as of May 2024 defending John Eastman, Peter Navarro, Mike Roman.

== Property purchases and finances ==
=== "Patriot's Row" Washington DC Properties ===
Within the span of one year, limited liability companies connected to CPI purchased nine properties that are "steps" from each other in Washington D.C. Grid News refers to these purchasing entities as "shell companies". The total purchase price for these properties is $41 million. These properties are located two blocks east of the United States Capitol, which houses the U.S. Congress. The purchased properties, which CPI now controls, consist of "four commercial properties along a single Pennsylvania Avenue block, three adjoining rowhouses around the corner, and a garage and carriage house in the rear alley. CPI's aim, as expressed in its annual report, is to transform the swath of prime real estate into a campus it calls 'Patriot's Row'".

=== "Camp Rydin" Eastern Shore Compound ===
In December 2021, CPI purchased a 2,200-acre (890 ha) compound near the eastern shore in Cambridge, Maryland. Described as a "conservative Camp David", the eleven bedroom lodge is "a place where conservatives can strategize and unite" and features marshland for hunting, fishing and kayaking as well as indoor tennis and basketball courts. Roughly a dozen congressional staff training events are held at the compound each year, including a "researcher bootcamp" and a "legislative director retreat".

The name of Edward Corrigan, the president of CPI, appears on public documents related to the property purchases. The companies involved in the purchases list Cameron Seward, CPI's general counsel and director of operations, as an officer on corporate filings, and give CPI's Independence Avenue headquarters as their principal address. Seward's name also appears on the purchasing companies' incorporation documents.

=== Finances ===
==== 2021 ====
Finances for fiscal year 2021 consist of: revenue of $45,707,730; expenses of $17,160,422; and donations of $45,027,954—more donations than its first four years altogether. $25 million came from one person, Mike Rydin, a retired software developer. (Since 2021, other large donors have eclipsed Rydin.)

==== 2022 ====
According to the New Yorker magazine, CPI and its network of mostly non-profit groups raised "nearly" $200 million in 2022. According to CPI tax filings in that year,

- $15.5 million came from "an unnamed donor".

Other large donors were

- Servant Foundation, a fund affiliated with David Green, billionaire and founder of the chain store Hobby Lobby;
- Donors Trust, a fund connected with the Koch family and Leonard Leo;
- Bradley Impact Fund;
- Dave Frecka, a food company entrepreneur; and
- Mike Rydin (whose foundation gave $1.5 million).

==== Criticisms ====
A 2022 NPR investigation found CPI might be violating prohibitions on 501(c)(3) charities (as a nonprofit, it is prohibited from "partisan spending or certain kinds of lobbying") providing benefits to political parties by supporting candidates and groups aligned with the Republican Party. Members of its network though have affiliated groups which are legally allowed to spend money on political advertising with few restrictions. (America First Legal, for example has a non-non-profit called Citizens for Sanity which spent in excess of $90 million on TV advertisements blaming the Biden administration "for crime, high inflation, and low wages on illegal immigration and warned viewers that Biden was leading the country toward 'World War Three'”. )

According to the investigative journalism group Documented CPI has moved money through different groups to disguise the fact that Trump funded part of some electoral challenges of the 2020 presidential election. (The Political action committee Save America — founded and controlled by Donald Trump — donated a million dollars to CPI, which donated a million to American Voting Rights Foundation, which donated a million dollars to audit of voting in the 2020 presidential election in Arizona). This connection seemed to contradict public pronouncements by Republican leaders in Arizona who insisted that the election audit had “absolutely has nothing to do with Trump”.

== See also ==
- Make America Great Again
- Save America PAC
- Ziklag (organization)
