= Limited government =

Political philosophy advocating a government limited in power

In political philosophy, limited government refers to a government limited in power. It is a key concept in the history of liberalism and is closely associated with constitutionalism.

Milestones in limiting governmental power include the Magna Carta, and the United States Constitution; the term dates back to the late 16th century and to King James VI and I. In his Two Treatises of Government, John Locke argued that a government formed by social contract may exercise only the powers the people grant it, and set out four limits.

Constitutions have pursued limited government in different ways; the US Constitution relies on separation of powers among the three branches of the government, as well as between the federal and the state governments. The French constitution of 1793, influenced by Rousseau, favoured legislative supremacy and democratic self-government that expressed the general will. Liberal theorists disagree on how far the government should be limited.

== History ==
The Magna Carta and the U.S. Constitution also represent important milestones in the limiting of governmental power. The earliest use of the term limited government dates back to King James VI and I in the late 16th century. Scholar Steven Skultety argues that although Aristotle never developed principles and tactics of constitutionalism, Aristotle's political philosophy in some ways anticipated the idea of limited government, primarily as a tool for limiting civic distrust and enhancing stability.

John Locke, a liberal philosopher, was an important theorist of modern democratic government. Writing in his Two Treatises of Government, Locke reasoned that men living in a state of nature would voluntarily join in a social contract, forming a "commonwealth" or government. Locke further reasoned that the powers of the government had to be restricted to only what the people allowed it to do. He cites four specific limitations on government power. Locke's first limitation specified that governments could only govern according to promulgated established laws, and that all people were equal under the law, regardless of their material or social status, and Locke's second limitation held that laws could only be designed in the name of the common good (2nd Tr., § 136). His third limitation repeated the principle of no taxation without representation, arguing that, "[governments] must not raise taxes on the property of the people, without the consent of the people, given by themselves, or their deputies" (2nd Tr., § 142). Finally, Locke argued in his fourth limitation that the legislature could not delegate law-making authority to any other power without the people's consent (2nd Tr., § 141).

When limited government is put into practice, it often involves the protection of individual liberty from government intrusion.

According to The World Justice Project Rule of Law Index which measures adherence to the rule of law in 140 countries and jurisdictions around the globe, checks on government powers eroded in 58% of countries measured from 2021 to 2022.

== Issues ==
Amy Gutmann notes that negative liberalism, positive liberalism, and democratic liberalism all advance different conceptions of the proper limits to government. Gutmann connects the first two categories to Isaiah Berlin's notions of negative liberty and positive liberty, respectively. Gutmann defends the third category, democratic liberalism, writing that under this view, "a liberal government should be no more nor less limited than is needed, first, to secure basic liberties and opportunities for all individuals, and second to respect the outcomes of fair democratic procedures as long as they are consistent to the constitutional constraints of securing basic liberties and opportunities for all."

== Relationship to constitutions ==
Limited government is closely associated with constitutions and constitutionalism; the United States Constitution of 1789 and the French Constitution of 1793 were both enacted in an effort to reaffirm limited government, although in different ways. The U.S. Constitution achieved limited government through a separation of powers: "horizontal" separation of powers distributed power among branches of government (the legislature, the executive, and the judiciary, each of which provide a check on the powers of the other); "vertical" separation of powers (federalism) divided power between the federal government and the state government. James Madison, one of the authors of the Federalist Papers, noted that the Framers of the American Constitution sought to create a government that was capable of both being controlled and of exercising control. Madison wrote in Federalist No. 51 that "the great security against a gradual concentration of the several powers in the same department, consists in giving to those who administer each department, the necessary constitutional means, and personal motives, to resist encroachments of the others."

The 1793 French Constitution, on the other hand, cherished legislative supremacy and was based on the idea influenced by Rousseau – That limited government was best achieved through a "rational democratic self-government seeking to give expression to the general will ... as the optimal antidote to the arbitrary rule of absolute monarchy."

== See also ==
- Constitutionalism
- Enumerated powers
- Natural and legal rights
- Social contract
