= Ly Xīnzhèn M. Zhǎngsūn Brown =

Autistic disability rights activist

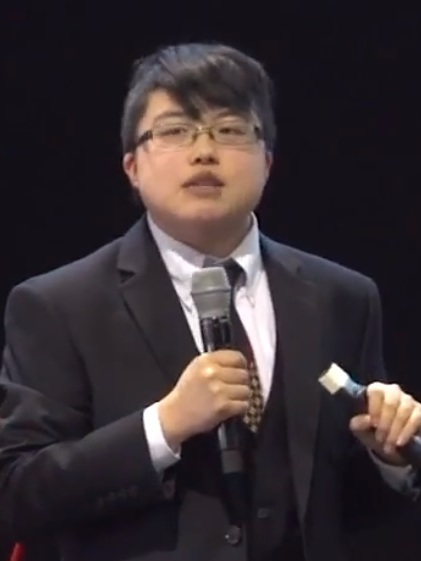
- Brown speaks at the Colorado Trust in 2017
- Born: 1993 (age 32–33)
- Education: Georgetown University (BA); Northeastern University (JD)
- Known for: Disability rights advocacy

Ly Xīnzhèn M. Zhǎngsūn Brown (formerly Lydia X. Z. Brown, born 1993) is an American autistic disability-rights activist, writer, attorney, and public speaker who was honored by the White House in 2013. They are the chairperson of the American Bar Association Civil Rights & Social Justice Disability Rights Committee. They are also policy counsel for privacy and data at the Center for Democracy & Technology, and director of policy, advocacy, and external affairs at the Autistic Women & Nonbinary Network. In 2022, they unsuccessfully ran for the Maryland House of Delegates in District 7A, losing to state delegate Kathy Szeliga and delegate-elect Ryan Nawrocki. As a student at Georgetown University, Brown served as the first undersecretary of disability affairs for the Georgetown University Student Association.

== Student activism ==
As an undergraduate student at Georgetown University from 2011 to 2015, Brown was a student organizer and advocate for other disabled students on campus. Brown served as the first undersecretary of disability affairs for the Georgetown University Student Association and was on the planning committee for the first university-recognized Disability Cultural Month in October 2012. They wrote and disseminated a citywide guide to resources for disabled students, surveyed student-government candidates on disability issues, organized a Twitter chat for disabled Georgetown students, and hosted and organized a lecture and performance series on disability justice that featured talks with disability activists, scholars, and cultural workers, including Karen Nakamura, Margaret Price, Leroy F. Moore Jr., Kassiane Asasumasu, Stephanie Kerschbaum, and Shain M. Neumeier.

In the fall of 2012, Brown designed a proposal for and organized a planning committee of over 20 university community members to advocate for the creation of a disability cultural center on campus. The planning committee's recommendations, in combination with a 2014 #BeingDisabledAtGeorgetown (shortened version: #BDGU) online campaign, contributed to the Disability Studies Minor Working Group's establishment of a disability studies course cluster in the fall of 2015 and Georgetown University's subsequent approval of the creation of a disability studies minor in 2017. It also led to the creation of a dedicated fund for sign-language interpretation and real-time captioning, and the creation of a dedicated access coordinator position. A disability cultural center had not yet been established as of May 2022.

As a Public Interest Law Scholar at Northeastern University School of Law, Brown helped to found the Disability Justice Caucus.

== Disability activism ==
Brown has described themself as having "fallen into activism by accident". They raised over $1,200 for a nonprofit organization's autism-awareness campaign and returned the funds to donors after discovering behavior "counter to the organization's stated mission." This experience led them to seek out and later work with the Autistic Self Advocacy Network. In Massachusetts, Brown first wrote and advocated for legislation in 2010 that would provide autism and developmental-disabilities training to law enforcement, including corrections officers. They continued to lobby for passage of that bill in subsequent years.

In 2011, Brown wrote a petition demanding school-district-wide policy changes in Mercer County, Kentucky after viewing local news coverage of an incident in which Christopher Baker, a nine-year-old autistic student, was punished by being placed inside a large bag. The petition gained over 200,000 signatures and media attention.

In 2013, Brown co-organized a protest outside the Food and Drug Administration White Oak Campus in Maryland against the Judge Rotenberg Center, a Massachusetts facility infamous for using powerful electric shocks to punish its autistic and other developmentally disabled residents. In 2014, Brown testified against the Judge Rotenberg Center's use of electric shocks at a Food and Drug Administration advisory panel hearing. Prior to the hearing, Brown submitted a written testimony on behalf of TASH New England arguing that electric-shock aversive devices should be banned as an ineffective and dangerous form of treatment. Brown maintains a living archive of documents and other resources related to the JRC on their website.

While still in college, Brown co-founded the Washington Metro Disabled Students Collective.

Brown was the lead editor of All the Weight of Our Dreams, an anthology of art and writing entirely by autistic people of color, published by the Autistic Women & Nonbinary Network in June 2017.

In 2020, Brown supported the Food and Drug Administration's ban of electric-shock devices at the Judge Rotenberg Center and said that there should be reparations for survivors of this method of torture.

=== Gendervague ===
A study by Nature Communications found that trans individuals were three to six times more likely to be autistic, and gender-diverse people are more likely to report traits of autism. The intersectionality of gender identity and neurodivergence resulted in the coining of the term gendervague, which falls under the non-binary and transgender umbrellas. Individuals who identify as gendervague feel that their gender identity and their neurodivergence are intertwined. Brown, who popularized the term, noted, "For many of us, gender mostly impacts our lives when projected onto us through other people's assumptions, but holds little intrinsic meaning."

== Career ==
Brown is a former Patricia Morrissey Disability Policy Fellow at the Institute for Educational Leadership. They were also a policy analyst for the Autistic Self Advocacy Network.

Brown was the chairperson of the Massachusetts Developmental Disabilities Council from 2015 to 2017, the youngest appointee chairing any state developmental-disabilities council in the United States.

As a graduate student, they were the 2018-2019 Justice Catalyst Legal Fellow at the Judge David L. Bazelon Center for Mental Health Law.

Brown has lectured on neurodiversity; connections between trans, queer, and disability experiences; racial justice and the disability rights movement; and intersectionality at numerous colleges and universities, including Yale University, Bellevue College, University of Virginia, Grinnell College, College of William & Mary, and Vanderbilt University as part of the Inclusive Astronomy Conference. In 2015, Brown gave the keynote speech at the Students of Color Conference held in Yakima, Washington, and in 2016, Brown gave the keynote speech at the Queer I Am Leadership Symposium held at South Puget Sound Community College.

They previously taught as a visiting lecturer at Tufts University's Experimental College, and as an adjunct lecturer in disability studies at Georgetown University and adjunct professorial lecturer in American studies at American University's Department of Critical Race, Gender, and Culture Studies.

== Awards and honors ==
In 2013, Brown was recognized by the White House Champions of Change program in commemoration of the 23rd anniversary of the Americans With Disabilities Act.

The Washington Peace Center selected Brown as the recipient of its 2014 Empowering the Future Youth Activist Award for their work with the Washington Metro Disabled Students Collective and the Autistic Self Advocacy Network.

In 2015, Brown was named a Top Thinker Under 30 in the Social Sciences by Pacific Standard and included on Mic's inaugural list of "the next generation of impactful leaders, cultural influencers, and breakthrough innovators."

In 2018, Brown was awarded the National Association for Law Placement Pro Bono Publico Award, which is annually awarded to one law student in the United States who makes significant contributions to underserved populations through pro bono services.

== Personal life ==
Brown describes themself as a "a multiply disabled, queer, and nonbinary/transmasculine Chinese American, East Asian survivor of transracial/transnational adoption, a Jew of color and Jew by choice".

== Selected works ==
- "intersectionality – a dialogue with Devonya N. Havis and Lydia X. Z. Brown", Addressing Ableism: Philosophical Questions via Disability Studies. Jennifer Scuro (2017)
- "Ableist Shame and Disruptive Bodies: Survivorship at the Intersection of Queer, Trans, and Disabled Existence", Religion, Disability, and Interpersonal Violence. ed. Andy J. Johnson, J. Ruth Nelson, & Emily M. Lund (2017)
- All the Weight of Our Dreams: On Living Racialized Autism. ed. Lydia X. Z. Brown, E. Ashkenazy, & Morénike Giwa Onaiwu (2017)
- "Autism Isn't Speaking: Autistic Subversion in Media & Public Policy", Barriers and Belonging: Personal Narratives of Disability. ed. Michelle Jarman, Leila Monaghan, & Alison Quaggin Harkin (2017)
- "'You Don't Feel Like A Freak Anymore': Representing Disability, Madness, and Trauma in Litchfield Penitentiary", Feminist Perspectives on Orange Is The New Black: Thirteen Critical Essays. ed. April Kalogeropoulos Householder & Adrienne Trier-Bieniek (2016)
- "How Not To Plan Disability Conferences", QDA: A Queer Disability Anthology. ed. Raymond Luczak (2015)
- "Compliance is Unreasonable: The Human Rights Implications of Compliance-Based Behavioral Interventions under the Convention Against Torture and the Convention on the Rights of Persons with Disabilities", Torture in Healthcare Settings: Reflections on the Special Rapporteur on Torture's 2013 Thematic Report ed. Center for Human Rights & Humanitarian Law (2014)
- "Disability in an Ableist World" in Criptiques ed. Caitlin Wood (2014)
