= Wildlife Protection Act =

Wildlife Protection Act may refer to:

- Wild Life (Protection) Act, 1972, India
- California Wildlife Protection Act of 1990, California
- Wildlife Protection Act of 2010, Washington DC
