= Kathy Szeliga =

American politician (born 1961)

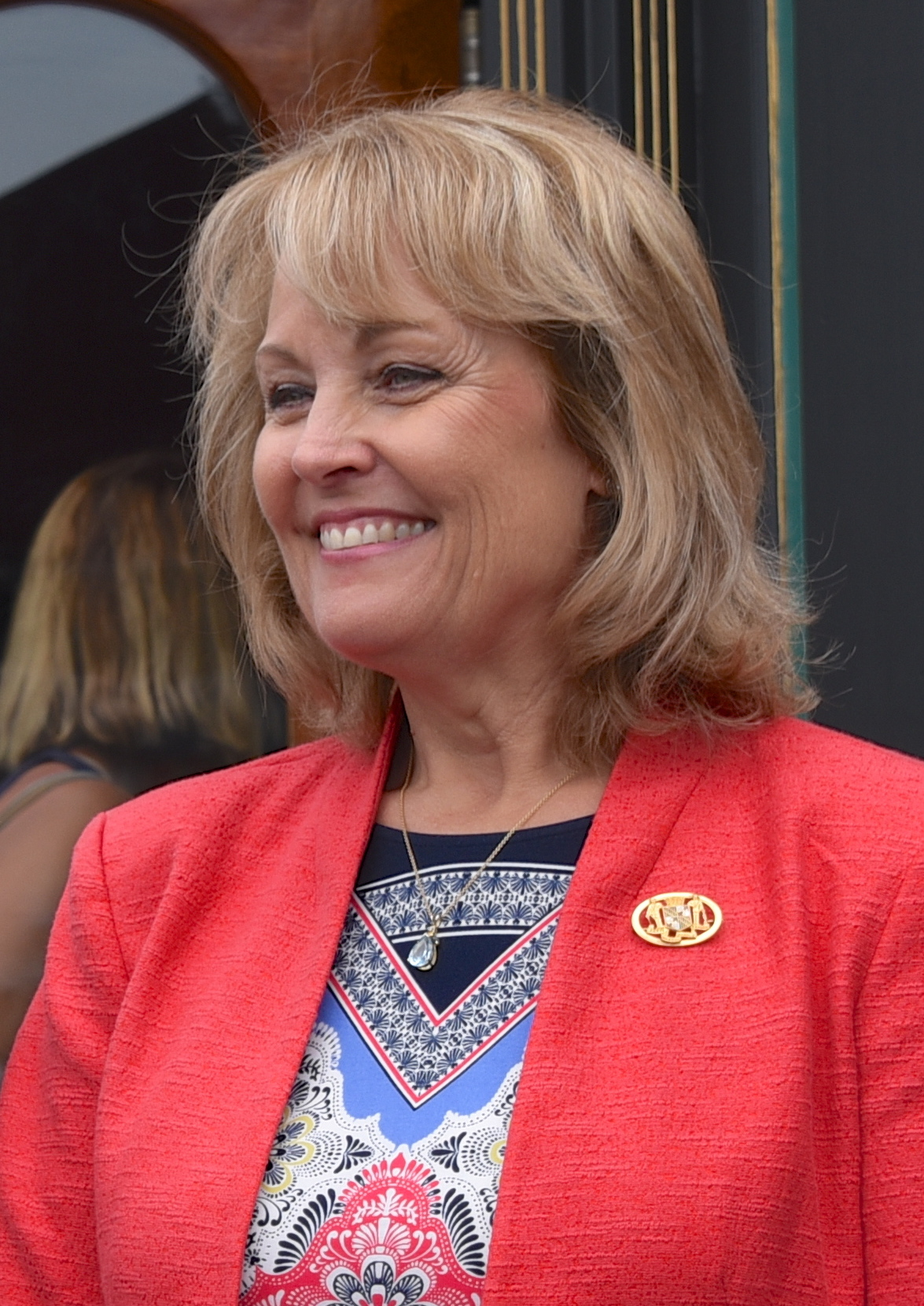

Member of the Maryland House of Delegates from the 7A district
- Incumbent
- Assumed office January 12, 2011 Serving with Ryan Nawrocki
- Preceded by: J. B. Jennings
- Constituency: 7th district (2011–2023) district 7A (2023–present)

Personal details
- Born: October 10, 1961 (age 65) Baltimore, Maryland, U.S.
- Party: Republican
- Spouse: Mark (m. 1980)
- Children: 2
- Education: Towson University (BA)

Kathy Szeliga (born October 10, 1961) is an American politician who has served as a Republican member of the Maryland House of Delegates since January 12, 2011, and as Minority Whip from 2013 to 2021. Szeliga was the Republican nominee for the United States Senate in 2016 to replace Barbara Mikulski, who retired.

== Background ==
Szeliga was born in Baltimore, Maryland, in October 1961. She is of Polish descent. She was raised in a military family, her father being a lieutenant colonel in the United States Army. Szeliga married her husband in 1980, and the couple struggled financially at first. Szeliga worked as a dishwasher, a maid, and a housekeeper. She entered college in her thirties, enrolling at Towson State University and graduating summa cum laude with a Bachelor of Arts degree in elementary education. She began working as a teacher in Baltimore City Public Schools and started a construction business with her husband.

Szeliga first got involved with politics in the mid-1990s, organizing opposition against the Maryland School Performance and Assessment Program, a controversial test used to assess schools. She became involved with state politics after a family friend, James M. Kelly, was elected to the Maryland House of Delegates. She worked as a legislative aide to Kelly, then for Delegate John G. Trueschler, and eventually became chief of staff for then-State Senator Andy Harris. She decided to run for Delegate after Del. J. B. Jennings decided to run for the State Senate. She was elected and immediately placed on the Appropriations Committee.

== In the legislature ==
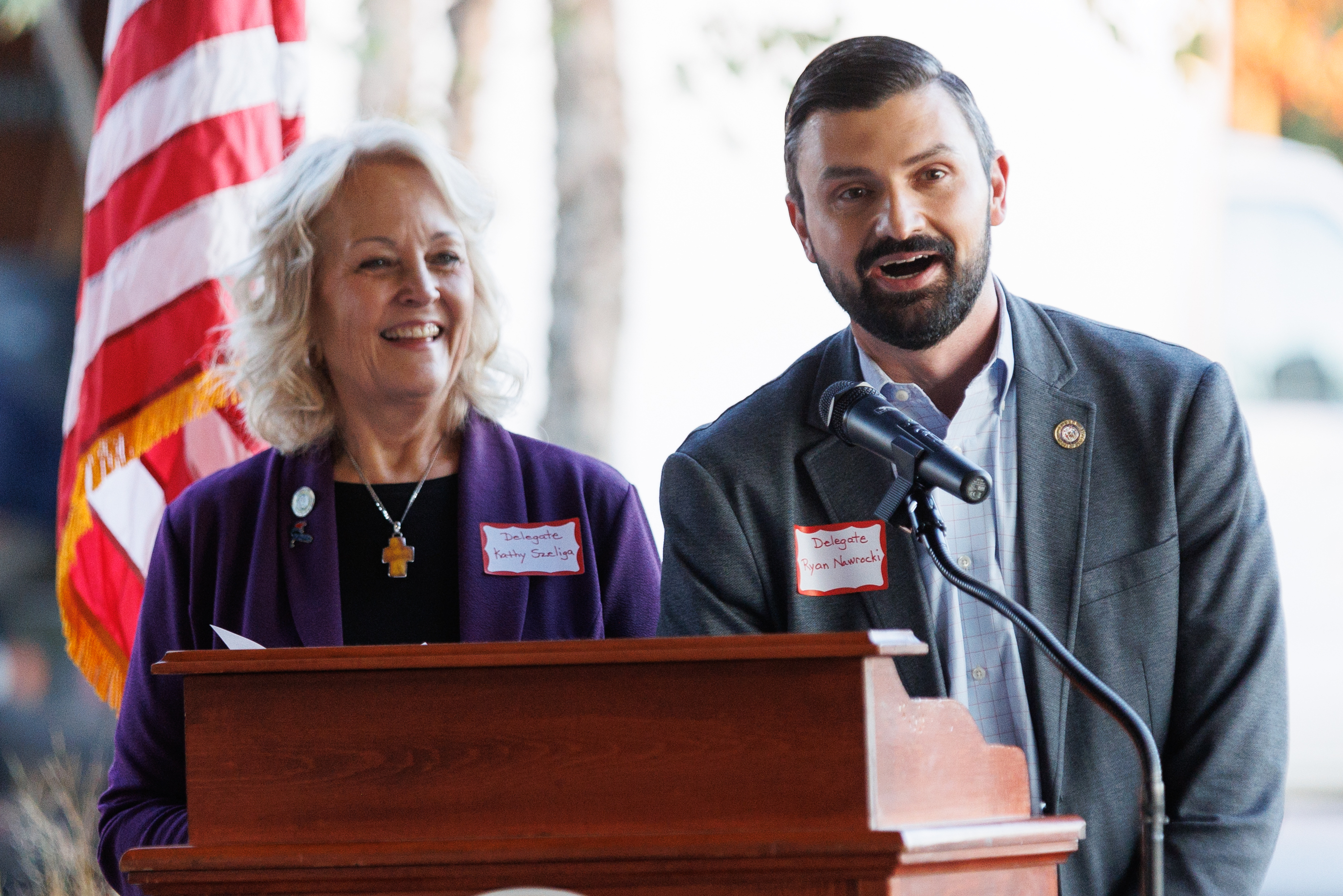
Nawrocki (right) and Szeliga (left) represent District 7A in the Maryland House of Delegates.

Szeliga was sworn into the Maryland House of Delegates on January 11, 2011. She served as a member of the Appropriations Committee from 2011 to 2015, the Transportation Committee from 2015 to 2016, and the Health and Government Operations Committee since 2017. From 2013 to 2021, Szeliga served as the House Minority Whip, making her the highest-ranking elected Republican woman in Maryland. A founding member of the Maryland Freedom Caucus, Maryland Matters has described Szeliga as one of the most vocal conservatives in the Maryland House of Delegates.

In May 2024, Szeliga faced criticism after making a Twitter post denouncing a video of "Queers for Palestine" protesters blocking a Florida interstate to bring attention to the Gaza war, writing, "These 'queers' need a one-way ticket to Gaza to see how Hamas feels about their lifestyle choices." In an interview with WBAL-TV, Szeliga rejected criticisms that her post was homophobic or anti-LGBTQ, saying that it was meant to be "informational".

In June 2024, Szeliga and three other Republican lawmakers signed onto a letter to the superintendent of Baltimore County Public Schools calling for the termination of Alexa Sciuto, a LGBTQIA+ advocate who taught at Baltimore County Schools. In the letter, the legislators alleged that Sciuto made death threats toward Kit Hart, the chair of the Carroll County Moms for Liberty chapter, citing a tweet from Sciuto that read, "Officer, I swear I didn't mean to murder her" above a picture of Hart. Sciuto had made the post after Hart failed to clearly define the word "woke" during a parents' rights panel in Towson. In June 2025, Sciuto filed a defamation lawsuit against the lawmakers, multiple Moms for Liberty members, and Libs of TikTok, claiming that her tweet was rhetorical and that the lawmakers had mischaracterized it as a death threat. Sciuto's lawsuit against the lawmakers was dismissed in April 2026.

Szeliga represented the 1st congressional district as a delegate to the 2024 Republican National Convention, pledged to Donald Trump. Had Trump won Maryland in the 2024 presidential election, Szeliga would have been an elector pledged to Trump.

In February 2026, WBFF reported that Szeliga's campaign treasurer, James Appel, had been questioned by the Federal Bureau of Investigation regarding more than $100,000 in inconsistent bank balance connected to her campaign account. A few weeks later, Szeliga told The Baltimore Sun that her campaign finance committee may have been the victim of financial fraud, adding that she was cooperating with investigators, her campaign had begun an internal audit of its accounts, and would file amended finance reports with the Maryland State Board of Elections if discrepancies were found. In March 2026, Appel was indicted on federal charges of wire fraud and money laundering. According to the indictment, Appel allegedly routed $100,000 from Szeliga's campaign and another $100,000 from a local tennis nonprofit organization to refinance a loan on a 65-foot Pacific Mariner yacht.

=== Robocall controversy ===
In June 2018, Szeliga accused state delegate Richard Impallaria of sending out campaign mailers attacking Szeliga by calling her a closet Democrat. Impallaria initially declined responsibility for this, but after Szeliga emailed him to say she would inform their GOP colleagues about the fliers targeting her, he forwarded the email to every member of the House Republican caucus in which he referred to himself as the "evil genius" responsible for the attacks on Szeliga. The calls misleadingly claimed that Szeliga was a supporter of the transgender community and had voted in favor of a bill that would make it illegal to discriminate against someone on the basis of gender identity.

=== Redistricting lawsuit ===
Kathy Szeliga
(@KathyForMD)
tweeted:

Replying to @SpeakerAJones

Bitches!! The court is not gonna like to see that. The seven judges that get to see this and make a final decision will not like this press release. That is even better for us

March 26, 2022

In February 2022, Szeliga filed a lawsuit against the state's newly enacted congressional maps, arguing that the maps violated the Maryland Constitution's requirement that districts be compact and respect natural boundaries. On March 26, 2022, Judge Lynne A. Battaglia ruled that the congressional maps were unconstitutional, calling them a "product of extreme partisan gerrymandering". Shortly after the ruling, House Speaker Adrienne A. Jones released a statement on Twitter expressing disappointment in the ruling against the maps. Szeliga responded profanely to this statement, in a now-deleted tweet saying "Bitches!! The court is not gonna like to see that. The seven judges that get to see this and make a final decision will not like this press release. That is even better for us". She later apologized for the tweet, saying it was intended to be private and was inappropriate.

== 2016 U.S. Senate campaign ==
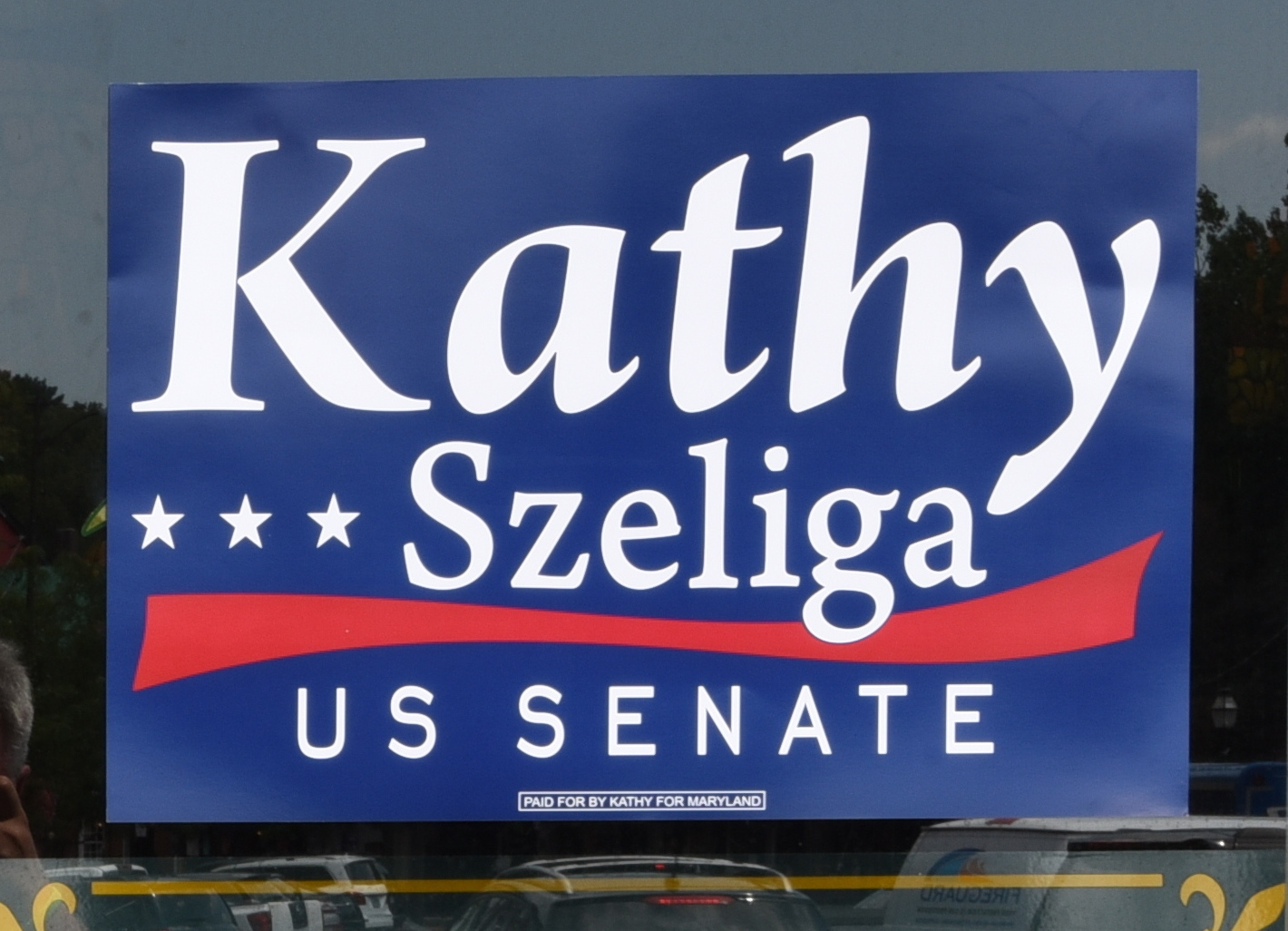
Kathy Szeliga for Senate campaign sign, 2016

Szeliga announced in November 2015 that she would be running for the Republican nomination to replace Senator Barbara Mikulski in the 2016 US Senate election in Maryland. She was the first Republican in the 2016 Senate primary to release ads on television. On April 15, Citizens United announced they had bought $25,000 worth of radio airtime to promote Szeliga ahead of the April 26 primary. Szeliga won the primary on April 26, 2016, and faced Representative Chris Van Hollen in the general election on November 8, 2016, in which she was defeated by a landslide 61% – 36% spread.

== Political positions ==
=== COVID-19 pandemic ===
In April 2020, Szeliga co-signed a letter calling on the Maryland Department of Health to share data on the 2,000 inmates released during the COVID-19 pandemic.

In August 2020, Szeliga condemned Montgomery County Health Officer Travis Gayles's decision to block private schools from holding in-person classes during the pandemic, calling it a "blatant abuse of power by an unelected bureaucrat".

In June 2021, Szeliga celebrated Governor Larry Hogan's decision to end early the $300 supplemental weekly unemployment insurance provided by the American Rescue Plan Act of 2021.

=== Crime and policing ===
In 2020, Szeliga introduced a raft of anti-crime bills, including bills that would make gun theft a felony and another requiring individuals incarcerated for violent crimes to serve 90 percent of their term before they're eligible for parole.

In 2021, Szeliga opposed Anton's Law, a bill that would allow certain officer misconduct records to be available for public inspection, arguing that the bill would allow the disclosure of unfounded claims against police officers. She also opposed the Police Reform and Accountability Act, an omnibus police reform bill.

During the 2023 legislative session, Szeliga introduced a bill to repeal the Juvenile Justice Reform Act, a bill that was introduced and passed in the previous year's legislative session that restricted the state's ability to charge juveniles for most offenses.

=== Development initiatives ===
In September 2017, Szeliga joined delegates Richard Impallaria and Pat McDonough in signing a letter to Harford County Executive Barry Glassman urging him to stop issuing permits for homes being built in Joppatowne, Maryland, after an auxiliary men's organization of the Ahmadiyya Muslim Community said that its builders would only sell homes in the community to Ahmadi Muslims. Shades and Springs Inc., the company building the homes, denied that they would only sell to Ahmadi Muslims, saying that its homes would be open to all.

In April 2023, Szeliga wrote to the Maryland Department of the Environment to express concerns with a proposal to convert the LaFarge quarry in Middle River, Maryland into an industrial park, asking the agency to study the property before allowing development.

=== Education ===
In March 2019, Szeliga opposed a bill that would allow local school districts to decide their class calendar, which undid an earlier executive order by Governor Larry Hogan that mandated a post-Labor Day start for schools statewide.

During the 2021 legislative session, Szeliga introduced a bill to establish a full-time virtual public school. She also opposed the legislature's veto override of the Blueprint for Maryland's Future, calling it "financially irresponsible".

In April 2023, Szeliga sent a letter to State Superintendent Mohammed Choudhury accusing the Maryland State Department of Education of hiding scores from failing scores by altering data files available on the department's website. An investigation conducted by the state inspector general found no evidence of these claims.

=== Foreign policy ===
During her Senate campaign, Szeliga was critical of the Iran Nuclear Deal.

=== Gun policy ===
In 2013, Szeliga voted against a bill that banned assault rifles and required a person to obtain a license to buy a handgun. In August 2016, during a meeting with gun control activists and gun violence victims, she said she supported stricter enforcement for existing firearms laws but opposed stricter regulations. During the 2018 legislative session, Szeliga introduced the Parishioner Protection Act, a bill that would allow churchgoers to carry firearms. The bill was reintroduced in 2019.

=== Health care ===
During her Senate campaign, Szeliga said she opposed the Affordable Care Act, saying that it hurt small businesses. She did not support its repeal, saying that she instead supported making it more workable. Szeliga also said she supported privatizing parts of medical care provided by the United States Department of Veterans Affairs, but opposed a full privatization of the department.

In April 2023, Szeliga voted against a bill to establish a framework for a legal marijuana industry in Maryland following the passage of Question 4, saying she opposed the bill's various provisions in the licensing process and zoning requirements for dispensaries.

=== Immigration ===
During her Senate campaign, Szeliga said she opposed building a wall on the U.S.-Mexico border.

During the 2020 legislative session, she introduced a bill that sought to protect Harford County's 287(g) agreement with the United States Immigration and Customs Enforcement (ICE). In February 2021, she opposed a bill to extend the state's earned income tax credit to undocumented immigrants. In February 2026, Szeliga opposed a bill to prohibit counties from entering into 287(g) program agreements with ICE, saying that the programs helped remove serious offenders from communities.

In February 2026, Szeliga criticized a bill passed by the Baltimore County Council to prohibit private detention facilities from operating in the county, saying in a joint statement with state delegate Ryan Nawrocki that there was no evidence that ICE intended to operate a detention facility in Hunt Valley and that Baltimore County "should be assisting federal authorities to protect the public, not fighting them".

=== Minimum wage ===
Szeliga opposes increases to the minimum wage, calling it a "short-term fix" and saying that low-wage earners are more interested in a career than a bump in salary.

=== National politics ===
During her Senate campaign, Szeliga said she opposed shutting down the government over policy disputes.

In June 2016, Szeliga distanced herself from comments made by then-presumptive Republican presidential nominee Donald Trump against Judge Gonzalo P. Curiel, a federal judge of Mexican descent, calling them "insulting" and "racist". In October 2016, she said he was "appalled" by a vulgar discussion Trump had on Access Hollywood in 2005 about groping and trying to have sex with women. She later endorsed Trump in the 2016 United States presidential election. Szeliga also attacked Hillary Clinton for her use of a private email server while serving as United States Secretary of State.

In February 2019, Szeliga assisted Maryland Republican National Committee representative David Bossie in assembling a "Trump 2020 Leadership Team" in Maryland.

In August 2020, Szeliga joined five other Republican state delegates in signing an American Legislative Exchange Council letter against providing additional federal assistance to cash-strapped states and counties, calling it a "bailout" for states that haven't managed their fiscal affairs properly.

In November 2020, Szeliga retweeted posts from House Minority Whip Steve Scalise and a video clip from Tucker Carlson Tonight that questioned the results of the 2020 United States presidential election. In July 2022, Szeliga defended U.S. Representative Andy Harris after the United States House Select Committee on the January 6 Attack said he had met with Trump to discuss a strategy on blocking the results of the presidential election in certain states, comparing it to supporters of Hillary Clinton questioning the results of the 2016 presidential election.

In May 2024, Szeliga signed onto a letter condemning the jury's guilty verdict in the Trump hush money trial, calling the ruling a "political prosecution from a kangaroo court and left-leaning prosecutor" that is turning the U.S. justice system into a "third world parody of law and order".

In February 2025, Szeliga defended the Trump administration's mass firing of federal employees, saying that she was receiving "thank-yous" from federal workers who saw firsthand how the government spends its money because of the furloughs.

=== Paid sick leave ===
In January 2018, Szeliga said she opposed a bill to require employers with more than 15 workers to provide employees with paid sick leave, calling it "overly prescriptive".

=== Redistricting ===
In February 2019, Szeliga supported a proposal to create a 2020 referendum to establish an independent redistricting commission in Maryland. In November 2025, amid proposals to redraw Maryland's congressional districts to counter Republican gerrymandering efforts in various red states, Szeliga said that she would sue to overturn any map passed by the Maryland General Assembly and gather signatures to petition the congressional map on the 2026 ballot. In January 2026, she criticized the process used by the Governor's Redistricting Advisory Commission to hear testimony on mid-decade redistricting proposals in Maryland as "authoritarian".

=== Social issues ===
Szeliga has repeatedly introduced bills aimed at prohibiting transgender students from participating in girls' sports teams in schools. In March 2014, she voted against a bill banning discrimination against transgender people, writing that it would "jeopardize the safety of women and little girls by allowing predators and pedophiles access to the women's bathroom, locker rooms, shower rooms and other similar places." During the 2022 legislative session, Szeliga introduced an amendment to the Inclusive Schools Act, a bill to ban public schools and boards of educations from discriminating against students on the basis of sexual orientation, gender identity, or sex, that would have blocked public schools from discussing gender and sexuality in the classroom. The amendment was blocked by a 95-37 vote. This amendment was criticized by the Maryland State Education Association, who likened it to the "Don't Say Gay" law in Florida.

During the 2019 legislative session, Szeliga introduced a bill with state delegate David Moon that would require legislative sessions to be livestreamed. The bill was withdrawn after House Speaker Michael E. Busch and Senate President Thomas V. Miller Jr. said they would begin livestreaming sessions in 2020. On January 30, 2020, the Maryland General Assembly livestreamed its first legislative session on YouTube.

During her Senate campaign, Szeliga said she would reject any Supreme Court nominee that supported abortion rights. In February 2021, she joined state delegates Sid Saab and Dan Cox at a protest against abortion outside the Maryland State House. In February 2023, Szeliga said she opposed a bill that would create a 2024 referendum on codifying the right to abortion access, saying that "Maryland's current abortion laws are radical and should not be enshrined in our constitution". to Later that month, she proposed an amendment to the bill that would ban late-term abortions.

During protests against the murder of George Floyd in June 2020, protesters in the Little Italy neighborhood of Baltimore tore down and threw a statue of Christopher Columbus into the Jones Falls canal of the Baltimore Harbor. Following this incident, Szeliga called to protect the statue, calling its removal "shameful".

In March 2021, Szeliga opposed a bill to remove "Maryland, My Maryland" as the official state song, likening the bill to cancel culture.

During the 2025 legislative session, Szeliga opposed a bill that would remove the prohibition of selling condoms in public school vending machines.

=== Taxes ===
During the 2019 legislative session, Szeliga introduced the "Commonsense Tax Cut Act of 2019", a bill to lower the state's income tax rate by 0.25%. The tax cut would have cost the state an estimated $400 million.

In March 2021, Szeliga introduced an amendment to eliminate taxes on cable and satellite television services.

In March 2022, Szeliga called on Governor Larry Hogan to provide $1,000 in tax relief to every Maryland resident. In June 2022, she said she supported a suspension of the state's gas tax for the remainder of the year following the Russian invasion of Ukraine.

== Personal life ==
Szeliga met her future husband, Mark, in Ocean City, Maryland when she was a high schooler. The two moved to Boulder, Colorado when she was 18, and married in 1980. After the birth of her first child, they moved to Perry Hall, Maryland. She is an evangelical Christian.

== Electoral history ==
Maryland House of Delegates District 7 Republican primary election, 2010
Party	Candidate	Votes	%
Republican	Pat McDonough (incumbent)	6,479	27.2
Republican	Richard Impallaria (incumbent)	5,678	23.8
Republican	Kathy Szeliga	4,021	16.9
Republican	Brian Bennett	1,838	7.7
Republican	Marilyn Booker	1,808	7.6
Republican	Roger Zajdel	1,783	7.5
Republican	John Cromwell	1,031	4.3
Republican	Jim Berndt	873	3.7
Republican	Laine O. C. Clark	312	1.3

Maryland House of Delegates District 7 election, 2010
Party	Candidate	Votes	%
Republican	Pat McDonough (incumbent)	27,217	23.1
Republican	Rick Impallaria (incumbent)	25,450	21.6
Republican	Kathy Szeliga	24,573	20.9
Democratic	Jeff Beard	14,885	12.6
Democratic	Kristina A. Sargent	13,551	11.5
Democratic	James Ward Morrow	11,960	10.2
Write-in		111	0.1

Maryland House of Delegates District 7 election, 2014
Party	Candidate	Votes	%
Republican	Pat McDonough (incumbent)	35,627	26.9
Republican	Kathy Szeliga (incumbent)	33,197	25.0
Republican	Rick Impallaria (incumbent)	32,560	24.6
Democratic	Bob Bowie, Jr.	11,154	8.4
Democratic	Norman Gifford, Jr.	10,192	7.7
Democratic	Pete Definbaugh	9,707	7.3
Write-in		145	0.1

United States Senate Republican primary election results in Maryland, 2016
Party	Candidate	Votes	%
Republican	Kathy Szeliga	135,337	35.6
Republican	Chris Chaffee	52,066	13.7
Republican	Chrys Kefalas	36,340	9.6
Republican	Richard J. Douglas	29,007	7.6
Republican	Dave Wallace	23,226	6.1
Republican	Sean P. Connor	21,727	5.7
Republican	Lynn Richardson	20,792	5.5
Republican	John R. Graziani	16,722	4.4
Republican	Greg Holmes	16,148	4.3
Republican	Mark McNicholas	9,988	2.6
Republican	Joseph David Hooe	8,282	2.2
Republican	Anthony Seda	3,873	1.0
Republican	Richard Shawver	3,155	0.8
Republican	Garry Thomas Yarrington	2,988	0.8

United States Senate election results in Maryland, 2016
Party	Candidate	Votes	%
Democratic	Chris Van Hollen	1,659,907	60.9
Republican	Kathy Szeliga	972,557	35.7
Green	Margaret Flowers	89,970	3.3
Write-in		3,736	0.1

Maryland House of Delegates District 7 election, 2018
Party	Candidate	Votes	%
Republican	Kathy Szeliga (incumbent)	38,617	25.4
Republican	Lauren Arikan	35,476	23.3
Republican	Rick Impallaria (incumbent)	34,223	22.5
Democratic	Allison Berkowitz	19,550	12.8
Democratic	Gordon Koerner	15,614	10.3
Green	Ryan Sullivan	8,443	5.5
Write-in		324	0.2

Maryland House of Delegates District 7A election, 2022
Party	Candidate	Votes	%
Republican	Kathy Szeliga (incumbent)	18,034	37.1
Republican	Ryan Nawrocki	17,859	36.8
Democratic	Ly Xīnzhèn M. Zhǎngsūn Brown	12,371	25.5
Write-in		295	0.6

Party political offices
Preceded by Eric Wargotz	Republican nominee for U.S. Senator from Maryland (Class 3); 2016	Succeeded by Chris Chaffee
