= Pat McDonough =

American politician

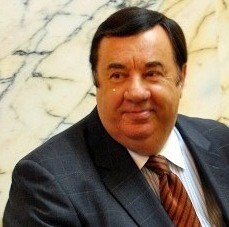

Member of the Maryland House of Delegates from the 7th district
- In office January 8, 2003 – January 9, 2019
- Preceded by: Nancy M. Hubers
- Succeeded by: Lauren Arikan

Member of the Maryland House of Delegates from the 46th district
- In office January 10, 1979 – January 12, 1983
- Preceded by: John Linz
- Succeeded by: American Joe Miedusiewski

Personal details
- Born: September 12, 1943 (age 82) Baltimore, Maryland, U.S.
- Party: Republican
- Profession: Radio talk show host, entrepreneur

Patrick L. McDonough (born September 12, 1943) is an American politician. He was previously a Republican member of the Maryland House of Delegates and a candidate for County Executive of Baltimore County, Maryland, in the 2018 and 2022 elections. He represented District 7, which covers Baltimore and Harford counties, along with fellow Republicans J.B. Jennings and Richard K. Impallaria. He also served in the House from 1979 to 1983 as a Democrat.

== Education ==
McDonough attended Baltimore parochial schools. He then attended Baltimore City College. He later attended the University of Baltimore.

== Career ==
McDonough has been a radio talk show host and producer. He is the president of the Maryland Leadership Council and the Future Leaders of America. He is a founding member of the Maryland Coalition Against Crime. He is a member of the Route 40 Business Civic Association and the Essex-Middle River-White Marsh Chamber of Commerce. He is also active with the Hawthorn Civic Association, the Joppa Residents Council, and the Harford County Pro Life group.

McDonough is also a part of the President's Rally for America and the Classroom Coalition since 2004. He serves as the host for "Inside Annapolis", which is produced by Harford Community College Television. He is co-chair of the Annual Flag-waving Tribute to Victims and Families of 9–11.

McDonough is known for his continual push to make English the official language for the State of Maryland.

In March 2007, a resolution was sponsored by State Senator Nathaniel Exum calling for the state of Maryland to officially apologize for its role in slavery. McDonough criticized the bill as being a "superficial gesture designed to make people feel guilty". Additionally, he mentioned that, "I don't think apologies solve anything." McDonough was one of six dissenting votes in the House. Slavery existed in Maryland since 1642, was legally formalized in 1664, and was abolished under Maryland law by a new state constitution in 1864.

In July 2007, McDonough called for the impeachment of Montgomery County Circuit Court Judge Katherine Savage who released a non-English-speaking rape suspect when he demanded a court-appointed interpreter and none were available. The suspect speaks Vai, a West African language. Judge Savage claimed that not having an interpreter denied the suspect his Constitutional right to a speedy trial, as provided by the Sixth Amendment to the United States Constitution. Delegate McDonough maintained that the defendant did not need an interpreter, as he had attended both high school and college in the U.S., and had been successfully interviewed (in English) four times during the course of the investigation.

McDonough's circulated widely in early 2012 as he mounted a legislative challenge to the neighboring District of Columbia's Wildlife Protection Act of 2010.

McDonough's current radio program can be heard on WCBM AM680 radio in Baltimore on Saturday evenings from 8pm to 10pm.

He ran in the 2018 primary election as a Republican candidate for County Executive of Baltimore County. He lost the primary to Al Redmer, 55%-44%. During the campaign, he pledged "dramatic and powerful change" if elected, calling for more police and greater efforts to combat gangs and drugs.

On April 18, 2022, McDonough announced he would again run for County Executive of Baltimore County.

=== Legislative notes ===
- Supports continued criminal prohibition of marijuana, stating in March 2015, regarding legalization, "Who's the winner? The drug dealer. Who's the loser? The community."
- Opponent of criminal law reform in regard to non-violent crime, stating in March, 2015, regarding a number of Maryland state bills aimed at reducing incarceration, "Power to the criminal. This is the year of the criminal, apparently."
- voted against the Clean Indoor Air Act of 2007 (HB359) BILL INFO-2007 Regular Session-HB 359
- voted against in-state tuition for illegal immigrants in 2007 (HB6) 2007 Regular Session - Vote Record 0690
- voted for the Healthy Air Act in 2006 (SB154) 2006 Regular Session - Vote Record 0942
- voted for slots in 2005 (HB1361) 2005 Regular Session - Vote Record 0152

== Election results ==
- 2018 Republican primary election for Baltimore County Executive

Voters to choose one:

Name	Vote	Percent	Outcome
Alfred W. Redmer Jr.	18,058	55.5%	Won
Pat McDonough	14,487	44.5%	Lost

- 2016 general election for US House of Representatives - Maryland District 2

Voters to choose one:

Name	Votes	Percent	Outcome
C. A. Dutch Ruppersberger, Dem.	192,183	62.1%	Won
Pat McDonough, Rep.	102,577	33.1%	Lost
Kristin S. Kasprzak, Libertarian	14,128	4.6%	Lost
Other Write-Ins	592	0.2%	Lost

- 2016 Republican primary election for US House of Representatives - Maryland District 2

Voters to choose one:

Name	Votes	Percent	Outcome
Pat McDounough	28,397	71.4%	Won
Carl H. Magee, Jr.	4,195	10.6%	Lost
Bill Heine	3,203	8.1%	Lost
Yuripzy Morgan	2,257	5.7%	Lost
Mark Gerard Shell	1,709	4.3%	Lost

- 2014 general election for Maryland House of Delegates - District 7

Voters to choose up to three:

Name	Votes	Percent	Outcome
Pat McDonough, Rep.	35,627	26.9%	Won
Kathy Szeliga, Rep.	33,197	25.0%	Won
Richard K. Impallaria, Rep.	32,560	24.6%	Won
Bob Bowie, Jr., Dem.	11,154	8.4%	Lost
Norman Gifford, Jr., Dem.	10,192	7.7%	Lost
Pete Definbaugh, Dem.	9,707	7.3%	Lost
Other Write-Ins	145	0.1%	Lost

- 2014 Republican primary election for Maryland House of Delegates - District 7

Voters to choose up to three:

Name	Votes	Percent	Outcome
Pat McDonough	6,971	29.0%	Won
Kathy Szeliga	6,125	25.5%	Won
Richard K. Impallaria	5,790	24.1%	Won
David Seman	3,483	14.5%	Lost
Tina Sutherland	1,675	7.0%	Lost

- 2010 general election for Maryland House of Delegates - District 7

Voters to choose up to three:

Name	Votes	Percent	Outcome
Pat McDonough, Rep.	27,217	23.1%	Won
Richard K. Impallaria, Rep.	25,450	21.6%	Won
Kathy Szeliga, Rep.	24,573	20.9%	Won
Jeff Beard, Dem.	14,885	12.6%	Lost
Kristina A. Sargent, Dem.	13,551	11.5%	Lost
James Ward Morrow, Dem.	11,960	10.2%	Lost
Other Write-Ins	111	0.1%	Lost

- 2010 Republican primary election for Maryland House of Delegates - District 7

Voters to choose up to three:

Name	Votes	Percent	Outcome
Pat McDonough	6,479	27.2%	Won
Richard K. Impallaria	5,678	23.8%	Won
Kathy Szeliga	4,021	16.9%	Won
Brian Bennett	1,838	7.7%	Lost
Marilyn Booker	1,808	7.6%	Lost
Roger Zajdel	1,783	7.5%	Lost
John Cromwell	1,031	4.3%	Lost
Jim Berndt	873	3.7%	Lost
Laine O. C. Clark	312	1.3%	Lost

- 2006 general election for Maryland House of Delegates – District 7

Voters to choose up to three:

Name	Votes	Percent	Outcome
Richard K Impallaria, Rep.	21,333	18.7%	Won
J. B. Jennings, Rep.	21,189	18.6%	Won
Pat McDonough, Rep.	23,184	20.3%	Won
Linda W. Hart, Dem.	17,122	15.0%	Lost
Jack Sturgill, Dem.	15,390	13.5%	Lost
Rebecca L. Nelson, Dem.	13,481	11.8%	Lost
Kim Fell, Green	2,307	2.0%	Lost
Other Write-Ins	83	0.1%	Lost

- 2006 Republican primary election for House of Delegates - District 7

Voters to choose up to three:

Name	Votes	Percent	Outrcome
Pat McDonouogh	4,214	30.1%	Won
J.B. Jennings	3,798	27.1%	Won
Richard K. Impallaria	3,654	26.1%	Won
John T. Laing	1,499	10.7%	Lost
Nikolai Volkoff	845	6.0%	Lost

- 2002 general election for Maryland House of Delegates – District 7

Voters to choose up to three:

Name	Votes	Percent	Outcome
J. B. Jennings, Rep.	22,470	20.4%	Won
Pat McDonough, Rep.	20,869	18.9%	Won
Richard Impallaria, Rep.	18,749	17.0%	Won
Nancy M. Hubers, Dem.	17,092	15.5%	Lost
Donna M. Felling, Dem.	14,205	12.9%	Lost
Randy Cogar, Dem.	13,926	12.6%	Lost
Michael F. Linder, Libertarian	2,817	2.6%	Lost
Other Write-Ins	80	0.1%	Lost

- 2002 Republican primary election for Maryland House of Delegates - District 7

Voters to choose up to three:

Name	Votes	Percent	Outcome
Pat McDonough	3,191	16.9%	Won
J.B. Jennings	3,126	16.5%	Won
Richard K. Impallaria	2,594	13.7%	Won
Sheryl L. Davis-Kohl	2,473	13.1%	Lost
Michael J. Davis	2,079	11.0%	Lost
Dilip B. Paliath	1,883	10.0%	Lost
Christopher Saffer	1,851	9.8%	Lost
Jackie Bailey	1,708	9.0%	Lost

- 1998 general election for Baltimore County Register of Wills

Voters to choose one:

Name	Votes	Percent	Outcome
Grace G. Connolly	123,896	59.7%	Won
Pat McDonough	83,471	40.3%	Lost

- 1996 general election for the US House of Representatives - Maryland District 3

Voters to choose one:

Name	Votes	Percent	Outcome
Ben Cardin, Dem.	130,204	67%	Won
Pat McDounough, Rep	63,229	33%	Lost

- 1996 Republican primary election for the US House of Representatives - Maryland District 3

Voters choose one:

Names	Votes	Percent	Outcome
Pat McDonough	12,115	70%	Won
Carroll Myers	3,979	23%	Lost
Joseph Cilipote	1,134	7%	Lost
