= Ryan Nawrocki =

American politician (born 1983/84)

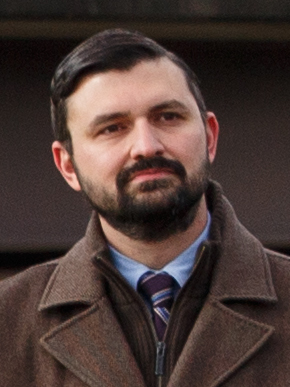
- Nawrocki in 2024

Member of the Maryland House of Delegates from the 7A district
- Incumbent
- Assumed office January 11, 2023 Serving with Kathy Szeliga
- Preceded by: Joseph C. Boteler III

Personal details
- Born: 1983 or 1984 (age 42–43)
- Party: Republican
- Spouse: Lauren
- Children: 5
- Education: St. Mary's College of Maryland (BA); Johns Hopkins University (MPA)
- Website: Campaign website

Ryan Nawrocki (born 1983/1984) is an American politician and communications professional. He is a member of the Maryland House of Delegates for District 7A in north Baltimore County, Maryland. He was previously a candidate for the Baltimore County Council in District 6 in 2010 and 2018.

== Background ==
Nawrocki attended St. Mary's College of Maryland, where he earned a Bachelor of Arts degree in political science, public policy, economics, and sociology, and Johns Hopkins University, where he earned a master's degree in public administration. After graduating, he started his own companies, including a medical aesthetics practice and a CBD company.

Nawrocki first got involved in politics by working in the Maryland Transit Administration, at which time he was the youngest appointee in the administration of Maryland governor Bob Ehrlich.

In 2010, Nawrocki unsuccessfully ran for the Baltimore County Council. He was defeated by Democratic nominee Cathy Bevins by 503 votes.

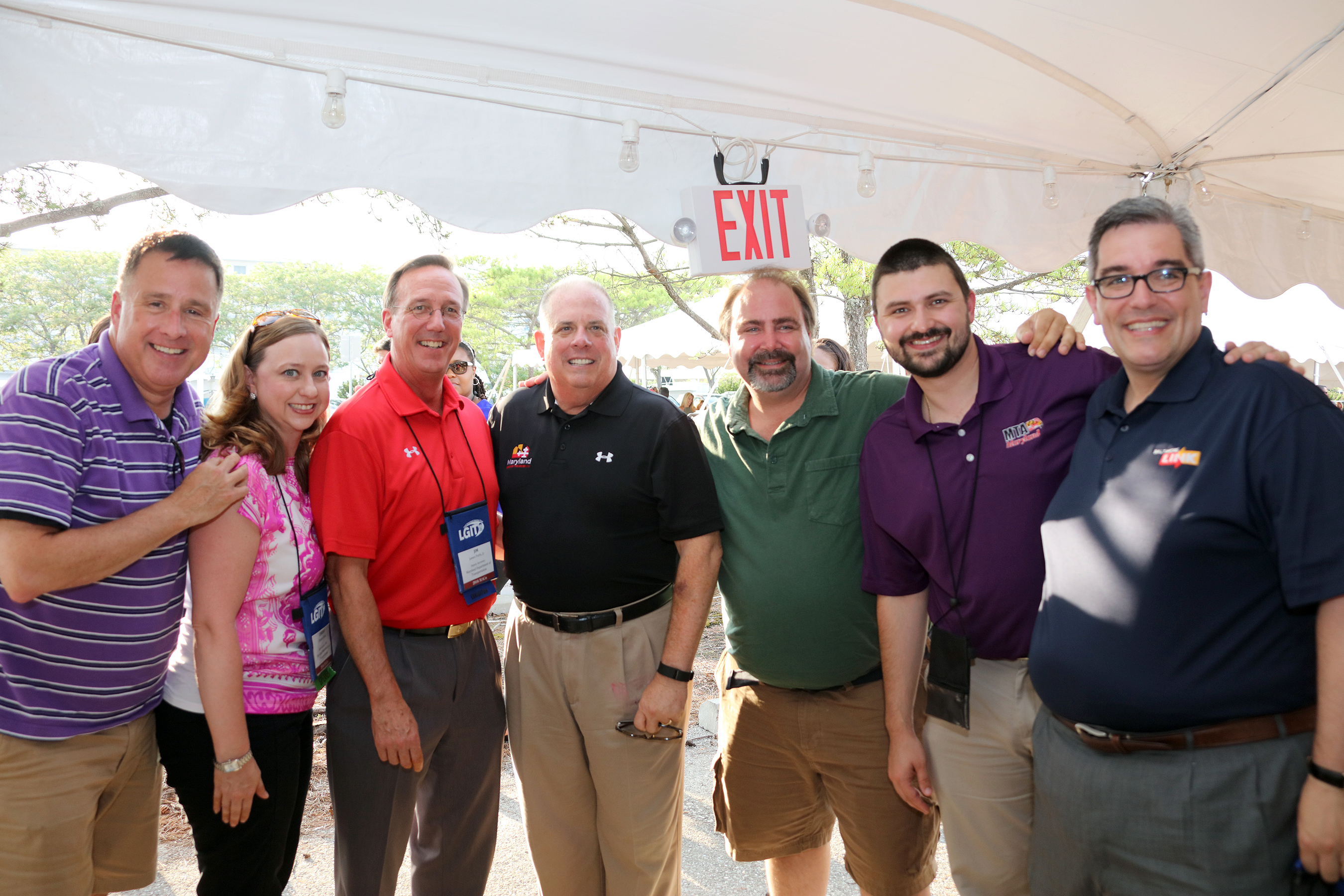
Nawrocki with Governor Larry Hogan at the 2016 Maryland Association of Counties conference

After his 2010 loss, Nawrocki began working as a spokesman to U.S. Representative Andy Harris, eventually becoming Harris' communication director. In January 2016, Nawrocki was appointed as senior director for the Maryland Transit Administration. Nawrocki also operated his own public relations firm, Red White and Blue LLC, which was hired by Maryland Environmental Service director Roy McGrath at a cost of $10,000 per month for work that included "challenge coins", writing remarks for senior staff including McGrath, note cards, and installation of new artwork in conference room.

Nawrocki once again challenged Bevins in the 2018 councilmanic elections, receiving endorsements from Ehrlich, Harris, and former county executive Roger B. Hayden. Bevins again defeated Nawrocki by 3,594 votes, or 8.5 percent.

In February 2022, Nawrocki announced his candidacy for the Maryland House of Delegates in District 7A. In May 2022, incumbent state Delegate Kathy Szeliga announced that she would run on a ticket with Nawrocki over state Delegate Joseph C. Boteler III. The two were also endorsed by state Senator J. B. Jennings and county councilmember David Marks. Nawrocki won the Republican primary, coming in second place behind Szeliga with 27.6 percent of the vote. He defeated autistic rights advocate Ly Xīnzhèn M. Zhǎngsūn Brown in the general election.

== In the legislature ==
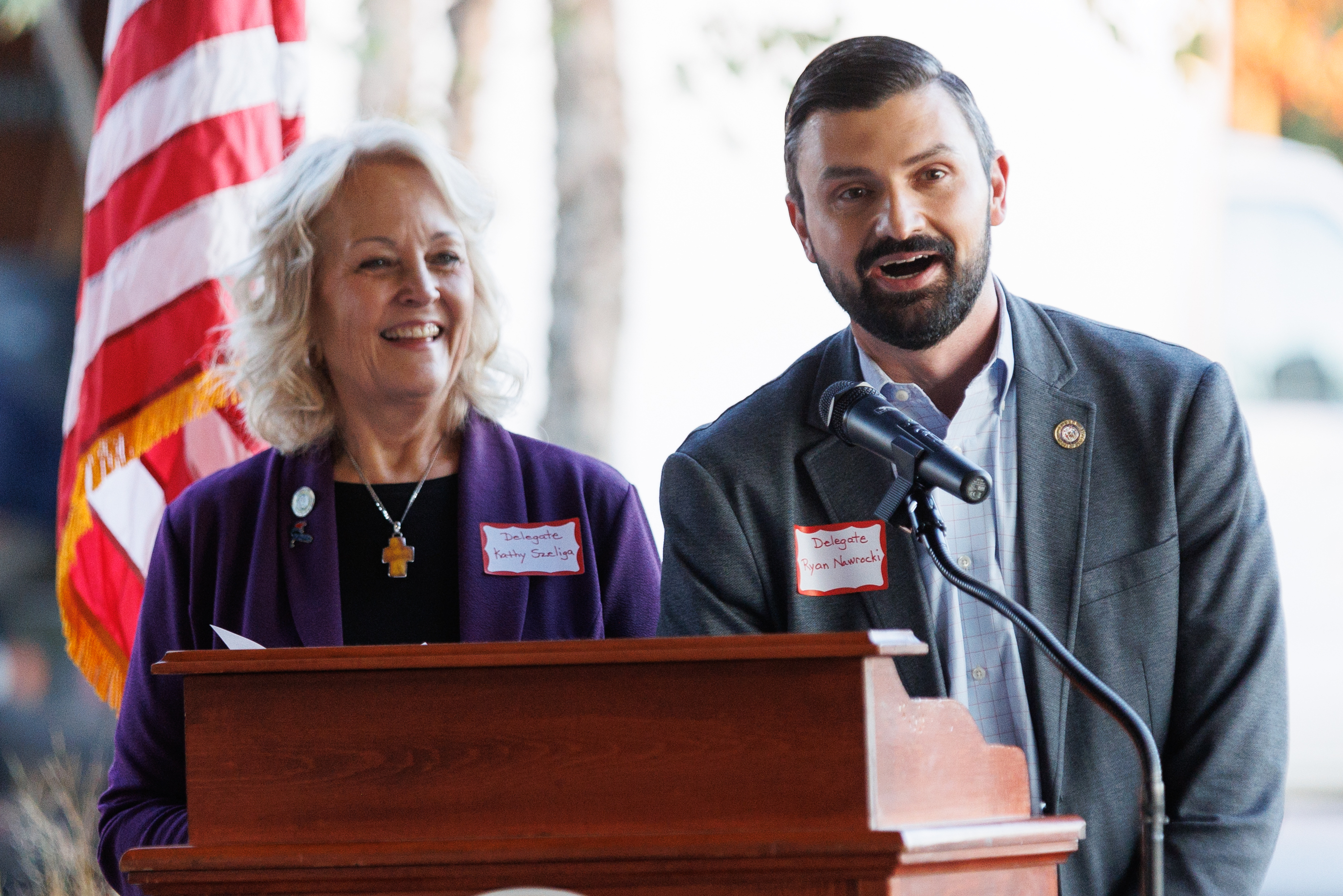
Nawrocki (right) and Szeliga (left) represent District 7A in the Maryland House of Delegates.

Nawrocki was sworn into the Maryland House of Delegates on January 11, 2023. He is a member of the House Environment and Transportation Committee and the Maryland Freedom Caucus.

In June 2024, Nawrocki and three other Republican lawmakers signed onto a letter to the superintendent of Baltimore County Public Schools calling for the termination of Alexa Sciuto, a LGBTQIA+ advocate who taught at Baltimore County Schools. In the letter, the legislators alleged that Sciuto made death threats toward Kit Hart, the chair of the Carroll County Moms for Liberty chapter, citing a tweet from Sciuto that read, "Officer, I swear I didn't mean to murder her" above a picture of Hart. Sciuto had made the post after Hart failed to clearly define the word "woke" during a parents' rights panel in Towson. In June 2025, Sciuto filed a defamation lawsuit against the lawmakers, multiple Moms for Liberty members, and Libs of TikTok, claiming that her tweet was rhetorical and that the lawmakers had mischaracterized it as a death threat. Sciuto's lawsuit against the lawmakers was dismissed in April 2026.

== Political positions ==
=== Education ===
In April 2023, Nawrocki sent a letter to State Superintendent Mohammed Choudhury accusing the Maryland State Department of Education of hiding scores from failing scores by altering data files available on the department's website. An investigation conducted by the state inspector general found no evidence of these claims.

=== Electoral and ethics reform ===
During the 2026 legislative session, Nawrocki introduced a bill clarifying that county-level inspectors general are not subject to standard Maryland Public Information Act request restrictions when conducting investigations. He also opposed a bill that prohibits counties and municipalities from implementing voting systems that diminishes the ability of minority groups to elect candidates of its choice, claiming that it would allow any protected class "unhappy with an election's outcome [to] sue their county into oblivion, claiming their vote was diluted".

=== Immigration ===
During the 2026 legislative session, Nawrocki opposed a bill that would prohibit counties from entering into 287(g) program agreements, claiming that it would allow "rapists and pedophiles" back onto the streets. In February 2026, he criticized a bill passed by the Baltimore County Council to prohibit private detention facilities from operating in the county, saying in a joint statement with state delegate Kathy Szeliga that there was no evidence that ICE intended to operate a detention facility in Hunt Valley and that Baltimore County "should be assisting federal authorities to protect the public, not fighting them".

=== National politics ===
In May 2024, Nawrocki signed onto a letter condemning the jury's guilty verdict in the Trump hush money trial, calling the ruling a "political prosecution from a kangaroo court and left-leaning prosecutor" that is turning the U.S. justice system into a "third world parody of law and order".

== Personal life ==
Nawrocki is married to his wife Lauren. Together, the couple has five children, and lives in Middle River, Maryland. He attends religious services at the Our Lady Queen of Peace Catholic Church and is a member of the church's Knights of Columbus council.

In November 2007, Nawrocki's then-girlfriend, now wife, twice called police to report a physical altercation between her and Nawrocki. In the first report, filed November 11, 2007, Nawrocki allegedly pushed her during an argument; Nawrocki denied it and she was not injured. In the second report, filed five days later, she told police that Nawrocki "hit her in the mouth, splitting her lip and then pushed her to the floor" during an argument at their Towson home. The report also alleges that Nawrocki "began to choke her and she had to dig her fingernails into his arms and back to make him let her go." Nawrocki was never charged with a crime in the incident and says the claims in the report were an exaggeration to police. His wife also said in an interview with The Baltimore Sun that the police reports don't represent what really happened. The police reports became relevant when he ran for county council in 2018, when protesters involved in women's organizations picketed outside Nawrocki campaign events holding signs that accused him of domestic violence. Nawrocki accused his opponent, incumbent county councilmember Cathy Bevins, of sending the protesters to his event, an accusation which Bevins called "absolutely ridiculous".

== Electoral history ==
Alternate Delegates to the Republican National Convention, District 1, 2008
Party	Candidate	Votes	%
Republican	Jamie Falcon (McCain)	35,665	18.9
Republican	Charles Edward Peck (McCain)	32,135	17.1
Republican	Delphine Peck (McCain)	28,747	15.3
Republican	Debbie Belcher (Huckabee)	20,120	10.7
Republican	Marirose J. Capozzi (Romney)	8,930	4.7
Republican	Dottie Griffith (Romney)	8,924	4.7
Republican	Stephen M. Wright (Romney)	8,362	4.4
Republican	Ryan Hohman (Paul)	5,733	3.0
Republican	Mary Amlong (Paul)	5,448	2.9
Republican	Jim Voris (Paul)	5,291	2.8
Republican	Michael J. Pappas (Thompson)	3,900	2.1
Republican	Steve Schuh (Giuliani)	3,271	1.7
Republican	Paul S. Magness (Giuliani)	3,095	1.6
Republican	Shannon Patricia Oxley (Thompson)	2,920	1.6
Republican	Lori L. Brown	2,888	1.5
Republican	Andrew M. Langer (Giuliani)	2,852	1.5
Republican	Greg Belcher	2,541	1.3
Republican	Richard L. Andrews	2,492	1.3
Republican	Ted Pibil (Thompson)	2,019	1.1
Republican	Ryan Nawrocki	1,113	0.6
Republican	John V. Daliani	997	0.5
Republican	Damon Pace	905	0.5

Baltimore County Council District 6 Republican primary election, 2010
Party	Candidate	Votes	%
Republican	Ryan Nawrocki	3,413	73.6
Republican	Andy Peet	1,225	26.4

Baltimore County Council District 6 election, 2010
Party	Candidate	Votes	%
Democratic	Cathy Bevins	18,002	50.6
Republican	Ryan Nawrocki	17,499	49.2
Write-in		43	0.1

Baltimore County Council District 6 Republican primary election, 2018
Party	Candidate	Votes	%
Republican	Ryan Nawrocki	2,419	50.6
Republican	Deb Sullivan	1,503	31.4
Republican	Erik Lofstad	411	8.6
Republican	Allen E. Robertson	267	5.6
Republican	Glen Alan Geelhaar	183	3.8

Baltimore County Council District 6 election, 2018
Party	Candidate	Votes	%
Democratic	Cathy Bevins	23,017	54.2
Republican	Ryan Nawrocki	19,423	45.7
Write-in		63	0.1

Maryland House of Delegates District 7A Republican primary election, 2022
Party	Candidate	Votes	%
Republican	Kathy Szeliga	4,979	36.9
Republican	Ryan Nawrocki	3,719	27.6
Republican	Steve Redmer	2,792	20.7
Republican	Joseph C. Boteler III	1,987	14.7

Maryland House of Delegates District 7A election, 2022
Party	Candidate	Votes	%
Republican	Kathy Szeliga	18,034	37.14
Republican	Ryan Nawrocki	17,859	36.78
Democratic	Ly Xīnzhèn M. Zhǎngsūn Brown	12,371	25.48
Write-in		295	0.61%
