= Richard Impallaria =

American politician (born 1962)

Rich Impallaria
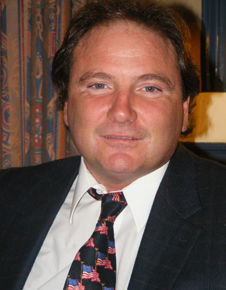

Member of the Maryland House of Delegates from the 7th district
- In office January 8, 2003 – January 11, 2023
- Preceded by: Nancy Hubers
- Succeeded by: Lauren Arikan (redistricting)

Personal details
- Born: November 1, 1962 (age 63) Baltimore, Maryland, U.S.
- Party: Republican
- Spouse: Sharon Kramer

Richard K. Impallaria (born November 1, 1962) is an American politician who served as a member of the Maryland House of Delegates, representing District 7 in Baltimore and Harford counties, from 2003 to 2023.

== Early life and career ==
Impallaria was born in Baltimore, Maryland. He attended Joppatowne High School in Joppa, Maryland. Prior to entering politics, Impallaria owned his own auto body shop in Middle River, Maryland. He was also a chair of Citizens for Property Rights, Essex-Middle River Community in Action, is the former president of the Joppatowne Chapter of the Jay Cees Men's Club.

Impallaria first got involved with politics in 2000, when he helped garner support for a referendum to repeal Senate Bill 509, which gave Baltimore County the power to condemn land in Essex and Randallstown for redevelopment. The referendum succeeded in repealing the legislation, passing in the November general election with 70 percent of voters voting to repeal it. Following the bill's defeat, Impallaria unsuccessfully tried to sell land in Essex for $1 million to the county for redevelopment.

In 2002, Impallaria ran for the Maryland House of Delegates, seeking to succeed state delegate Nancy Hubers. He won the Republican primary with 13.7 percent of the vote, coming in third place behind Pat McDonough and J. B. Jennings. In October 2002, state senator Andy Harris, state delegates Alfred W. Redmer Jr. and James F. Ports Jr., and Bob Ehrlich's campaign manager R. Karl Aumann asked Impallaria to withdraw from the House of Delegates election, expressing concerns over his criminal record. Impallaria won the general election on November 5, 2002, coming in third place with 17.0 percent of the vote.

== In the legislature ==
Impallaria was elected to the House of Delegates in 2002. He was sworn in on January 8, 2003, and was subsequently re-elected in 2006, 2010, 2014, and 2018. In 2022, Impallaria was redrawn into District 7B, where he ran for re-election but was defeated in the Republican primary in District 7B by state delegate Lauren Arikan in July 2022.

=== Committee assignments ===
Imapllaria was assigned to the following committees:

- Member, Economic Matters Committee, 2003–2023
  - Property and casualty insurance subcommittee, 2003–2015
  - Public utilities subcommittee, 2003–2010, 2015–2023
  - Unemployment insurance subcommittee, 2003–2006, 2017–2023
  - Alcoholic beverages subcommittee, 2007–2017
  - Workers' compensation subcommittee, 2011–2023
  - Consumer protection and commercial law subcommittee, 2012–2015
- Joint Committee on Unemployment Insurance Oversight, 2015–2023
- Deputy Minority Whip, 2015–2016

=== Robocall controversy ===
In June 2018, state delegate Kathy Szeliga accused Impallaria of sending out campaign mailers attacking Szeliga by calling her a closet Democrat. Impallaria initially declined responsibility for this, but after Szeliga emailed him to say she would inform their GOP colleagues about the fliers targeting her, he forwarded the email to every member of the House Republican caucus in which he referred to himself as the "evil genius" responsible for the attacks on Szeliga.

In January 2019, the Office of the State Prosecutor charged Impallaria's chief of staff, Tyler Walch, for violating state election law for making robocalls to Szeliga's constituents without disclosing who paid for and who authorized the message. The calls misleadingly claimed that Szeliga was a supporter of the transgender community and had voted in favor of a bill that would make it illegal to discriminate against someone on the basis of gender identity. The National Center for Transgender Equality, the non-profit social equity organization mentioned on the robocalls, said that no one with the organization was contacted by Impallaria or his campaign in connection with the call. Impallaria denied any knowledge about the call, saying that he never approved or paid for it. In April 2019, his chief of staff was convicted and sentenced to 100 hours of community service and a $1,000 fine for violating the authority line requirements of Maryland election law.

In May 2019, the Maryland Republican Party asked Impallaria to resign from the Maryland House of Delegates, saying he was "unworthy of the title Delegate" following a controversy over a campaign robocall, a history of traffic violations, and a lawsuit against party officials. Impallaria refused to resign, saying that it was up to his constituents to decide whether he stays in the Maryland General Assembly.

== U.S. House of Representatives campaigns ==
=== 2012 ===
In January 2012, Impallaria declared his candidacy for the United States House of Representatives in Maryland's 2nd congressional district, challenging incumbent U.S. Representative Dutch Ruppersberger. Impallaria, a resident of the town of Joppa, lived nine-tenths a mile outside of the 2nd district. During the primary election, he was endorsed by delegate Pat McDonough and ran on a platform of opposing same-sex marriage and in-state tuition for illegal immigrants. Impallaria was defeated in the Republican primary by state senator Nancy Jacobs, receiving 23.8 percent of the vote and coming in second place.

=== 2020 ===
In January 2020, Impallaria again ran for the United States House of Representatives in Maryland's 2nd congressional district, challenging incumbent U.S. Representative Dutch Ruppersberger. He was defeated by state senator Johnny Ray Salling in the Republican primary election, placing fourth with 16.2 percent of the vote.

== Legal affairs ==
In 1982, Impallaria was charged with four counts of assault with intent to murder as a result of allegations that, "He tried to run down four people, including his mother and brother," and subsequently served three years probation for battery charge as a result of that incident.

In August 2003, the Maryland Department of the Environment issued a citation to Impallaria after concrete, dirt, and other debris was dumped into a stream that leads into the Middle River from his property. In November, he was again issued a 30-day citation over pollution to the stream, and gave him 30 days to clean up the rubble.

In July 2011, Impallaria filed a lawsuit as a mandamus action against Harford County sheriff Jesse Bane, alleging that Bane failed to prevent the withholding of personal property and license tags by T & S Towing, a local towing service company. In December 2011, Baltimore County Circuit Judge Barbara K. Howe dismissed Impallaria's claim with prejudice.

In August 2016, Impallaria was arrested in Ocean City, Maryland, and charged with driving under the Influence. In April 2017, he was convicted and sentenced to two days in jail. He was originally sentenced to 60 days due to his previous traffic record, which includes over 50 various citations.

On July 27, 2022, Impallaria was charged with multiple counts of theft and misconduct in office, alleging that he misused state funds involving a personal cottage and a district office in Essex, which is located outside of his district. On September 2, he was charged with illegal ammunition and gun possession by a prohibited individual. On January 13, 2023, Impallaria agreed to plead guilty to the misconduct charges and pay $44,100 in restitution to the state in a plea deal with prosecutors; after completing these actions, his case was converted to a probation before judgement status in June 2023, removing the convictions from his record. In April 2023, he again agreed to plead guilty to the firearm possession charge and was sentenced to 18 months of unsupervised probation by Circuit Court Judge Robert Cahill.

== Political positions ==
=== Capital punishment ===
In March 2013, Impallaria voted against a bill that would repeal capital punishment in Maryland. In October 2015, Impallaria, whose cousin died of an opioid overdose, said he would support sentencing drug dealers to death.

=== Environment ===
In March 2011, Impallaria said he opposed Governor Martin O'Malley's $1.5 billion proposal to spur offshore wind development in the state, calling the plan "a boondoggle that every single resident in the state is going to be shaken down to finance". The proposed plan would have raised the electric bill of every state resident over the next 20 years to pay for offshore wind farms in the state.

=== Immigration ===
In 2004, Impallaria confronted four lobbyists for immigrants' issues during a hearing on a bill to study the fiscal impact of illegal immigration, who he says referred to him as "racists" during testimony on the measure. Following the testimony, Impallaria followed the lobbyists into the hallway to ask the advocates if they were illegal immigrants, which they refused to answer.

In 2007, Impallaria said he opposed a bill introduced by state delegate Victor R. Ramirez that would allow illegal immigrants to attend public colleges and universities while paying in-state tuition.

=== Gambling ===
During his time in the Maryland House of Delegates, Impallaria repeatedly introduced bills that would allow American Legions and Veterans of Foreign Wars to operate electronic gambling machines in their clubs. During the 2011 special legislative session, he introduced an amendment allowing veterans organizations to operate gambling machines in their clubs, which passed.

In 2005, Impallaria voted to pass a bill that would legalize slot machines at four locations in the state, which passed by a vote of 71-66.

=== Gun control ===
In April 2013, Impallaria voted against the Firearm Safety Act of 2013, a bill that placed restrictions on firearm purchases and magazine capacity in semi-automatic rifles.

=== Minimum wage ===
In March 2014, Impallaria voted against a bill to raise the state minimum wage to $10.10 an hour by 2017.

=== National politics ===
In January 2020, Impallaria said he supported Donald Trump's 2020 re-election bid.

=== Paid family leave ===
In 2022, Impallaria voted against a bill that would provide 12 weeks of partially paid leave to recover from childbirth or serious illnesses, or to care for a loved one.

=== Right to repair ===
In 2022, Impallaria said he supported a right to repair bill that would have allowed farmers to repair their own farm equipment. The bill was rejected by the House Economic Matters Committee on March 7, 2022.

=== Social issues ===
In 2010, Impallaria said he opposed allowing Harford County Public Schools students to access LGBT-related political, advocacy, and community support websites, using the term "homo promo" in a mass e-mail.

In 2011, Impallaria said he opposed a bill that would allow transgender people to use restrooms that match their gender identities. He also said he did not believe that employers should be required to accept a worker's decision to change their gender expression, and expressed concerns that anti-LGBT discrimination laws would lead to situations where "halfway through the school year, you have a schoolteacher that used to be Mr. Bob that's now Miss Sally".

In 2012, Impallaria voted against the Civil Marriage Protection Act, which legalized same-sex marriage in Maryland.

In 2019, Impallaria voted not to censure state delegate Mary Ann Lisanti after she used a racial slur to refer to a legislative district in Prince George's County, saying it would be inappropriate of him to judge Lisanti when he didn't have firsthand knowledge of what happened. He was the sole vote against the censure.

In March 2022, Impallaria introduced an amendment to an abortion rights bill that would require all aborted fetuses to be given religious burials and prohibit the sale of aborted fetal remains or tissue. The amendment failed on a vote of 38-88.

=== Taxes ===
In 2011, Impallaria said he opposed a $1,500 fine proposed by Governor Martin O'Malley for bad driving, calling it a "money grab" that the governor was "trying to slip in".

In March 2013, Impallaria voted against a bill to raise the state gas tax and index future increases to inflation to replenish the state's transportation fund, which passed by a 76-63 vote.

On April 13, 2015, the Maryland House of Delegates voted to repeal the unpopular mandate colloquially known as the "rain tax", by a vote of 138-1. He was the sole vote against the repeal.

In March 2016, Impallaria was one of two state delegates to vote against a bill that cuts the cost of a death certificate or a birth certificate from $24 to $10.

== Electoral history ==
Maryland House of Delegates District 7 Republican primary election, 2002
| Party | Candidate | Votes | % |
|---|---|---|---|
| Republican | Pat McDonough | 3,191 | 16.9 |
| Republican | J. B. Jennings | 3,191 | 16.9 |
| Republican | Rick Impallaria | 2,594 | 13.7 |
| Republican | Sheryl L. Davis-Kohl | 2,473 | 13.1 |
| Republican | Michael J. Davis | 2,079 | 11.0 |
| Republican | Dilip B. Paliath | 1,883 | 10.0 |
| Republican | Christopher Saffer | 1,851 | 9.8 |
| Republican | Jackie Bailey | 1,708 | 9.0 |

Maryland House of Delegates District 7 election, 2002
| Party | Candidate | Votes | % |
|---|---|---|---|
| Republican | J. B. Jennings | 22,470 | 20.4 |
| Republican | Pat McDonough | 20,869 | 18.9 |
| Republican | Rick Impallaria | 18,749 | 17.0 |
| Democratic | Nancy M. Hubers | 17,092 | 15.5 |
| Democratic | Donna M. Felling | 14,205 | 12.9 |
| Democratic | Randy Cogar | 13,926 | 12.6 |
| Libertarian | Michael F. Linder | 2,817 | 2.6 |
| Write-in | | 80 | 0.1 |

Maryland House of Delegates District 7 election, 2006
| Party | Candidate | Votes | % |
|---|---|---|---|
| Republican | Pat McDonough (incumbent) | 23,184 | 20.3 |
| Republican | Rick Impallaria (incumbent) | 21,333 | 18.7 |
| Republican | J. B. Jennings (incumbent) | 21,189 | 18.6 |
| Democratic | Linda W. Hart | 17,122 | 15.0 |
| Democratic | Jack Sturgill | 15,390 | 13.5 |
| Democratic | Rebecca L. Nelson | 13,481 | 11.8 |
| Green | Kim Fell | 2,307 | 2.0 |
| Write-in | | 83 | 0.1 |

Maryland House of Delegates District 7 election, 2010
| Party | Candidate | Votes | % |
|---|---|---|---|
| Republican | Pat McDonough (incumbent) | 27,217 | 23.1 |
| Republican | Rick Impallaria (incumbent) | 25,450 | 21.6 |
| Republican | Kathy Szeliga | 24,573 | 20.9 |
| Democratic | Jeff Beard | 14,885 | 12.6 |
| Democratic | Kristina A. Sargent | 13,551 | 11.5 |
| Democratic | James Ward Morrow | 11,960 | 10.2 |
| Write-in | | 111 | 0.1 |

Maryland's 2nd congressional district Republican primary election, 2012
| Party | Candidate | Votes | % |
|---|---|---|---|
| Republican | Nancy Jacobs | 12,372 | 58.9 |
| Republican | Rick Impallaria | 4,998 | 23.8 |
| Republican | Larry Smith | 2,392 | 11.4 |
| Republican | Howard H. Orton | 500 | 2.4 |
| Republican | Ray Bly | 415 | 2.0 |
| Republican | Vlad Degen | 324 | 1.5 |

Maryland House of Delegates District 7 election, 2014
| Party | Candidate | Votes | % |
|---|---|---|---|
| Republican | Pat McDonough (incumbent) | 35,627 | 26.9 |
| Republican | Kathy Szeliga (incumbent) | 33,197 | 25.0 |
| Republican | Rick Impallaria (incumbent) | 32,560 | 24.6 |
| Democratic | Bob Bowie, Jr. | 11,154 | 8.4 |
| Democratic | Norman Gifford, Jr. | 10,192 | 7.7 |
| Democratic | Pete Definbaugh | 9,707 | 7.3 |
| Write-in | | 145 | 0.1 |

Maryland House of Delegates District 7 election, 2018
| Party | Candidate | Votes | % |
|---|---|---|---|
| Republican | Kathy Szeliga (incumbent) | 38,617 | 25.4 |
| Republican | Lauren Arikan | 35,476 | 23.3 |
| Republican | Rick Impallaria (incumbent) | 34,223 | 22.5 |
| Democratic | Allison Berkowitz | 19,550 | 12.8 |
| Democratic | Gordon Koerner | 15,614 | 10.3 |
| Green | Ryan Sullivan | 8,443 | 5.5 |
| Write-in | | 324 | 0.2 |

Maryland's 2nd congressional district Republican primary election, 2020
| Party | Candidate | Votes | % |
|---|---|---|---|
| Republican | Johnny Ray Salling | 5,942 | 19.1 |
| Republican | Genevieve Morris | 5,134 | 16.5 |
| Republican | Tim Fazenbaker | 5,123 | 16.4 |
| Republican | Rick Impallaria | 5,061 | 16.2 |
| Republican | Jim Simpson | 4,764 | 15.3 |
| Republican | Scott M. Collier | 3,564 | 11.4 |
| Republican | Blaine Taylor | 1,562 | 5.0 |
