= Lauren Arikan =

American politician (born 1984)

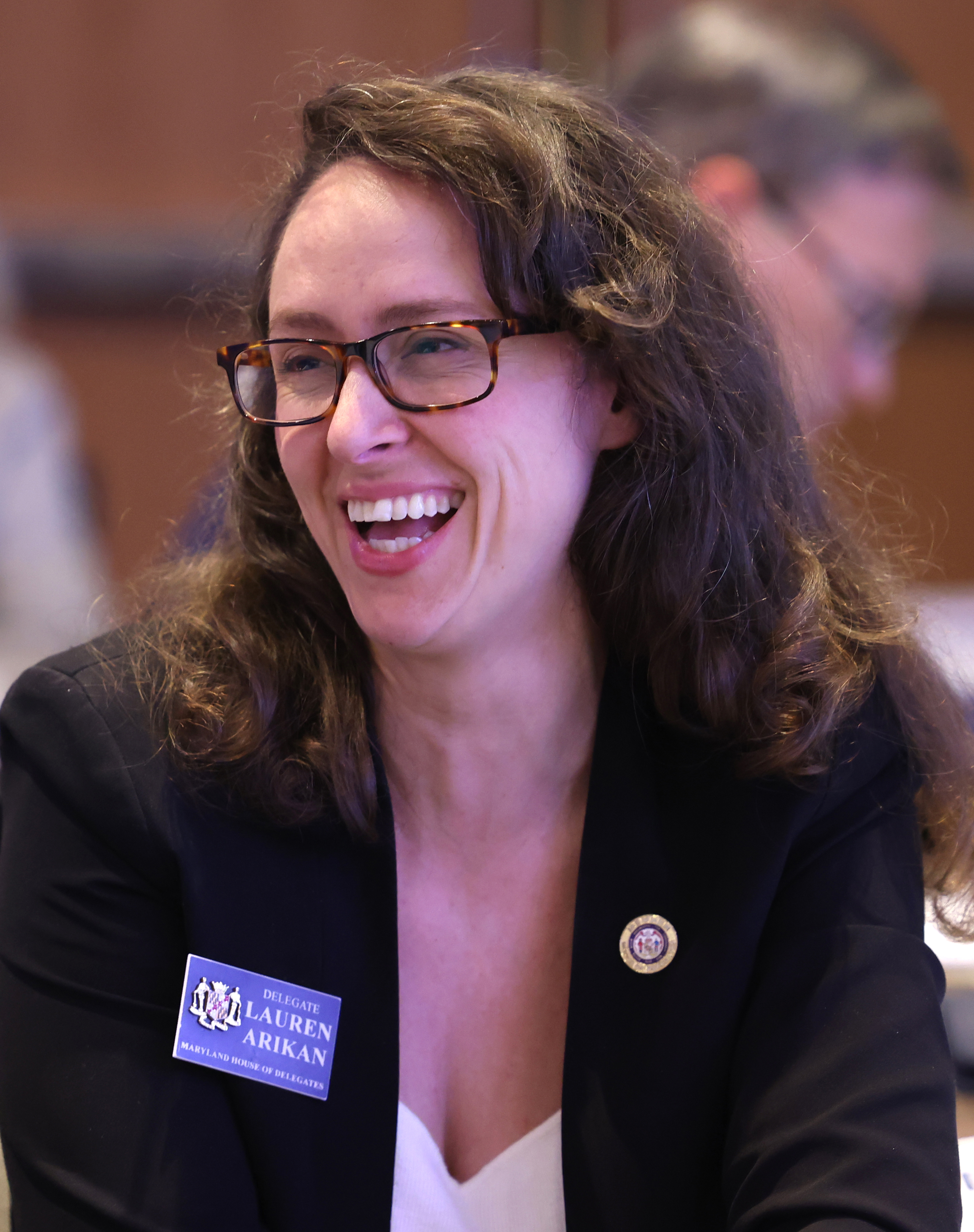
- Arikan at the 2024 Hazlitt Summit hosted by Young Americans for Liberty Foundation

Member of the Maryland House of Delegates
- Incumbent
- Assumed office January 9, 2019
- Preceded by: Pat McDonough (7th)
- Constituency: 7th district (2019–2023); District 7B (2023–present)

Personal details
- Born: December 14, 1984 (age 41) Ellicott City, Maryland, U.S.
- Party: Republican
- Spouse: Yusuf Perçin Arıkan (separated)
- Children: 4
- Education: McDaniel College; University of Baltimore

Lauren C. Arikan (born December 14, 1984) is an American politician who has served as a Republican member of the Maryland House of Delegates since 2019. She previously represented the 7th district from 2019 to 2023, afterwards being redrawn into district 7B.

== Early life and career ==
Arikan was born in Ellicott City, Maryland, on December 14, 1984. She attended McDaniel College and the University of Baltimore. Since 2009, she has worked at her family's businesses, Arikan Accounting and Tax, Arikan Acres, and Arikan Investments.

Arikan first got involved in politics in 2012 by becoming a member of the Board of Directors for the Maryland Friends of Midwives organization. From 2015 to 2018, she served as the chair of the Love Maryland PAC. In February 2018, Arikan filed to run for the Maryland House of Delegates in District 7. She won the Republican primary with 13.6 percent of the vote, coming in third place in a field of thirteen candidates. She defeated Democrats Allison Berkowitz and Gordon Koerner and Green Party candidate Ryan Sullivan in the general election, receiving 23.3 percent of the vote.

== In the legislature ==
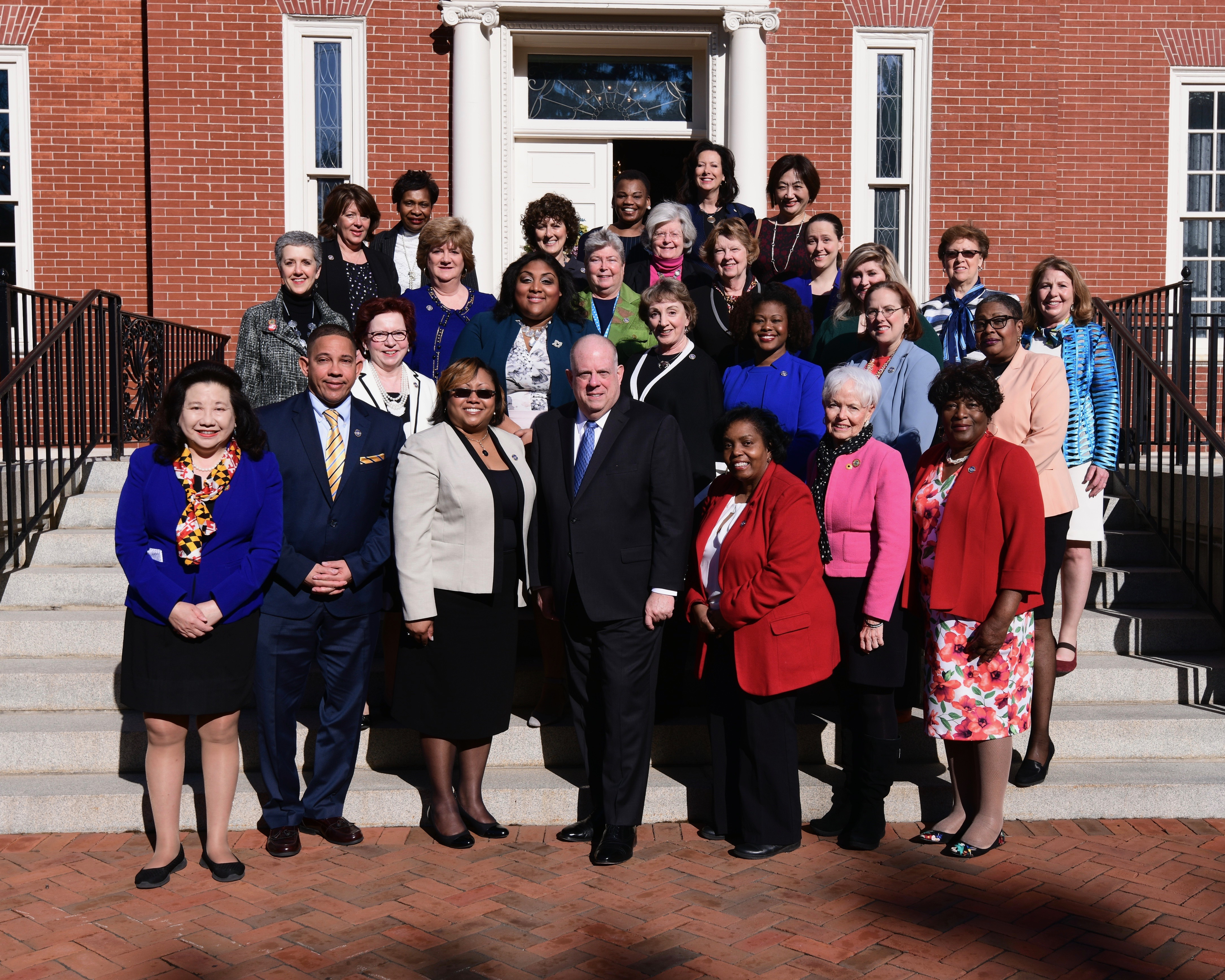
Arikan and other members of the Maryland Women's Legislative Caucus, 2019

Arikan was sworn into the Maryland House of Delegates on January 9, 2019. She was assigned to the Judiciary Committee by House Speaker Michael E. Busch. In 2021, she was elected to serve as vice president of the Women Legislators of Maryland caucus. She left the caucus in 2022 after its members voted to elect state delegate Lesley Lopez as its new president over Arikan, who was in line to become its next president. Arikan is also a member of the Maryland Freedom Caucus.

In August 2021, Arikan filed a complaint with the Maryland State Board of Elections against Michael Steele, who had formed a 527 committee to raise money for his exploratory effort in the 2022 gubernatorial election. Steele's campaign dismissed these allegations, calling them "completely meritless" and accusing Arikan of supporting Dan Cox in the Republican primary. Arikan denied these claims, saying that she intended to stay "completely out of the gubernatorial Republican primary".

During debate on a bill to prohibit counties from entering into 287(g) program agreements with U.S. Immigration and Customs Enforcement in February 2026, Arikan got into an argument with House Speaker Joseline Peña-Melnyk, who repeatedly reminded Arikan to just speak about the 287(g) measure after referencing immigration enforcement bills passed in previous sessions, after which Arikan said that the "chamber feels like it's being run like a Third World dictatorship that is silencing the opinions of the minority [party]". Following the floor session, she uploaded a video clip of her interactions with Peña-Melnyk online with the caption "Democrat Tyranny" and wrote a letter to the speaker in which she claimed that Peña-Melnyk was silencing her and reminding her that "Republican voices matter too". Peña-Melnyk responded to the letter in a statement to a reporter, saying that she makes "a judgment call in every moment on the House Floor with a dedication to impartiality" and that encouraging more civility in politics would "continue to be my North Star".

=== Social media use ===
In June 2024, Arikan and three other Republican lawmakers signed onto a letter to the superintendent of Baltimore County Public Schools calling for the termination of Alexa Sciuto, a LGBTQIA+ advocate who taught at Baltimore County Schools. In the letter, the legislators alleged that Sciuto made death threats toward Kit Hart, the chair of the Carroll County Moms for Liberty chapter, citing a tweet from Sciuto that read, "Officer, I swear I didn't mean to murder her" above a picture of Hart. Sciuto had made the post after Hart failed to clearly define the word "woke" during a parents' rights panel in Towson. In June 2025, Sciuto filed a defamation lawsuit against the lawmakers, multiple Moms for Liberty members, and Libs of TikTok, claiming that her tweet was rhetorical and that the lawmakers had mischaracterized it as a death threat. Sciuto's lawsuit against the lawmakers was dismissed in April 2026.

In June 2025, Arikan criticized a public dispute as "the gayest thing that's happened this Pride Month" while criticizing Pride-themed Maryland Transit Administration merchandise. In June 2026, Maryland Democratic Party chairman Steuart Pittman criticized Arikan for posting a photo on Facebook of her standing beside a "Welcome to West Virginia" sign while carrying a handgun on her hip with the caption "My Glock and I are marked safe from Wes Moore's Gay Gun Laws", accusing her of using "gay" as a slur. When asked about the criticism by The Baltimore Sun, Arikan defended her comments by saying that Maryland Democrats should "leave the speech policing to the third world dictators", but did not address the claim that she used the term derogatorily.

== Political positions ==
=== Crime ===
During the 2026 legislative session, Arikan opposed a bill that would end the practice of automatically charging minors as adults for certain crimes, saying that the bill would allow people that are organizing crime in Maryland to use children to "get away with it" and sends a message that the state is soft on crime.

=== Education ===
Arikan opposes mask mandates in schools. In August 2021, she attended an anti-mask rally outside a meeting for the Harford County school board. During the 2021 legislative session, Arikan introduced legislation that would allow parents living in districts that do not offer full in-person instruction by Fall 2021 to apply to receive the amount the state spends per child in public school to spend on private school tuition.

During the 2022 legislative session, Arikan opposed a bill that would create an Institute for Public Leadership at the University of Maryland.

In April 2023, Arikan sent a letter to State Superintendent Mohammed Choudhury accusing the Maryland State Department of Education of hiding scores from failing scores by altering data files available on the department's website. An investigation conducted by the state inspector general found no evidence of these claims.

=== Elections ===
Arikan supports the use of voter IDs in elections and placing restrictions on mail-in voting.

=== Housing ===
Arikan opposed legislation that would temporarily place restrictions on when landlords could evict their tenants until April 2022, and another that would guarantee low-income tenants a right to counsel in eviction cases, saying that she would sell her rental properties if the bills were enacted, instead investing in rental property in Pennsylvania.

=== Immigration ===
During the 2026 legislative session, Arikan opposed a bill prohibiting counties from entering into 287(g) program agreements with U.S. Immigration and Customs Enforcement, saying that the ban would "allow illegal criminals who are actually hurting, raping, murdering people in our state" and criticizing Democrats for making the bill a priority over other issues such as electric bills. She also opposed a bill that allows the attorney general of Maryland to use data collected through police surveillance methods to identify and gather evidence against a judicial officer if someone brought a complaint of wrongful conduct. In April 2026, Arikan called on President Donald Trump to slash federal funding to jurisdictions who attempt to restrict federal immigration enforcement.

=== National politics ===
In May 2024, Arikan signed onto a letter condemning the jury's guilty verdict in the Trump hush money trial, calling the ruling a "political prosecution from a kangaroo court and left-leaning prosecutor" that is turning the U.S. justice system into a "third world parody of law and order".

In February 2025, Arikan defended the Trump administration's mass firing of federal employees, saying that jobs aren't "guaranteed" and changing careers was "just a part of life". In November 2025, she criticized lawsuits filed by the attorney general of Maryland against the Trump administration, calling the lawsuits "politically motivated more than policy motivated" and a waste of taxpayer dollars.

In February 2026, Arikan said she opposed mid-decade redistricting, criticizing Texas, Missouri, and California for redrawing their districts as well as proposals to redraw Maryland's congressional districts. In August 2026, during debate on a proposed constitutional amendment on redistricting in Maryland, she introduced an amendment that would allow members of the Maryland General Assembly to face civil liability charges if a court found that a congressional map passed by the General Assembly deprived voters of federal constitutional rights.

=== Policing ===
During the 2026 legislative session, Arikan opposed a bill that would prohibit law enforcement officers from wearing face coverings while on duty.

=== Social issues ===
Arikan supports midwifery and is the founder of the Birth Circle of Baltimore. In March 2022, Arikan proposed an amendment to abortion rights legislation that would ban abortion services based on the gender of the fetus. The amendment failed by a vote of 40–86.

In March 2020, Arikan voted against a measure to kill legislation that would allow for liquor sales in Baltimore County on Sundays. The measure was approved by a vote of 14-4.

During the 2022 legislative session, Arikan opposed legislation that would ban threats made against health officials and hospital workers, saying that she received death threats during her first session in the General Assembly but "nothing ever came of it" after reporting it to law enforcement.

In February 2025, Arikan opposed a bill to repeal the prohibition of selling condoms in public school vending machines, saying that the bill is "the kind of stuff that makes swing states go red" and questioning why the bill would allow such vending machines to be installed in preschools.

During the 2026 legislative session, Arikan opposed cuts to the Developmental Disabilities Administration. In March 2026, she proposed an amendment to the state budget that would restore $150 million in funding the DDA by eliminating programs to assist students in private colleges as well as cuts to state funding to the Business Enterprise Administration and the Maryland Zoo. The amendment was rejected.

In May 2026, amid calls for state delegates Brian Chisholm and Mark N. Fisher to apologize to state delegate Chao Wu after using racist stereotypes, derogatory terms, and accusing Wu of being a spy for the Chinese Communist Party during an episode of Fisher's "Dumbest Bills in America" video series, Arikan defended the lawmakers, saying that the video was "factual" and not racist.

== Personal life ==
Arikan was married to Turkish-American Yusuf Perçin Arıkan. Together, they had four children. In February 2026, Maryland Matters reported that Arikan was in a relationship with state delegate Robin Grammer Jr.

Arikan lives on an eight-acre chicken and dairy goat farm in Jarrettsville, Maryland.

Arikan considers herself a member of the Turkish-American community.

== Electoral history ==
Maryland House of Delegates District 7 Republican primary election, 2018
| Party | Candidate | Votes | % |
|---|---|---|---|
| Republican | Kathy Szeliga (incumbent) | 7,127 | 23.3 |
| Republican | Richard Impallaria (incumbent) | 4,494 | 14.7 |
| Republican | Lauren Arikan | 4,173 | 13.6 |
| Republican | Aaron Penman | 3,216 | 10.5 |
| Republican | Bill Paulshock | 2,869 | 9.4 |
| Republican | Michael A. Geppi | 2,044 | 6.7 |
| Republican | David Seman | 1,981 | 6.5 |
| Republican | Tammy Larkin | 1,934 | 6.3 |
| Republican | Joshua Barlow | 1,548 | 5.1 |
| Republican | Angela Sudano-Marcellino | 498 | 1.6 |
| Republican | Russ English, Jr. | 374 | 1.2 |
| Republican | Norm Gifford | 219 | 0.7 |
| Republican | Trevor Leach | 148 | 0.5 |

Maryland House of Delegates District 7 election, 2018
| Party | Candidate | Votes | % |
|---|---|---|---|
| Republican | Kathy Szeliga (incumbent) | 38,617 | 25.4 |
| Republican | Lauren Arikan | 35,476 | 23.3 |
| Republican | Rick Impallaria (incumbent) | 34,223 | 22.5 |
| Democratic | Allison Berkowitz | 19,550 | 12.8 |
| Democratic | Gordon Koerner | 15,614 | 10.3 |
| Green | Ryan Sullivan | 8,443 | 5.5 |
| Write-in | | 324 | 0.2 |

Maryland House of Delegates District 7B Republican primary election, 2022
| Party | Candidate | Votes | % |
|---|---|---|---|
| Republican | Lauren Arikan (incumbent) | 3,014 | 53.2 |
| Republican | Richard Impallaria (incumbent) | 1,942 | 34.3 |
| Republican | Russ English Jr. | 292 | 5.2 |
| Republican | Rocky Wagonhurst | 208 | 3.7 |
| Republican | Nicholas Gladden | 205 | 3.6 |

Maryland House of Delegates District 7B election, 2022
| Party | Candidate | Votes | % |
|---|---|---|---|
| Republican | Lauren Arikan (incumbent) | 12,915 | 67.2 |
| Democratic | Medford J. Campbell III | 6,267 | 32.6 |
| Write-in | | 29 | 0.2 |
