= Maryland Legislative District 7 =

American legislative district

Maryland's legislative district 7
- Represents parts of Baltimore County and Harford County
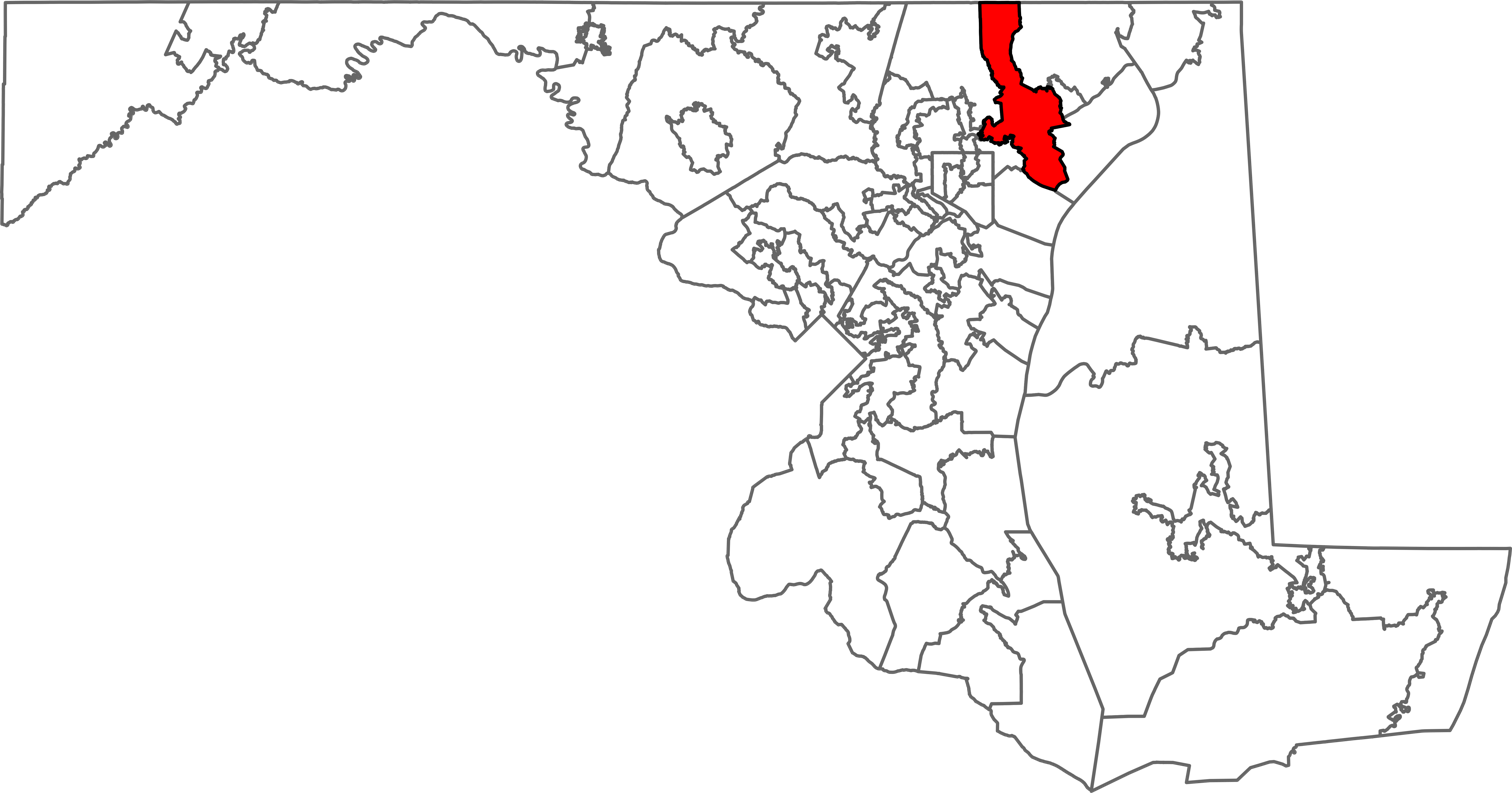
- Senator: J. B. Jennings (R)
- Delegate(s): Ryan Nawrocki (R) (District 7A); Kathy Szeliga (R) (District 7A); Lauren Arikan (R) (District 7B)
- Registration: 44.9% Republican; 34.7% Democratic; 18.9% unaffiliated
- Demographics: 75.9% White; 11.5% Black/African American; 0.3% Native American; 4.2% Asian; 0.0% Hawaiian/Pacific Islander; 1.9% Other race; 6.2% Two or more races; 4.5% Hispanic
- Population (2020): 140,902
- Voting-age population: 109,881
- Registered voters: 101,882

Maryland Legislative District 7 is one of 47 districts in the state for the Maryland General Assembly. The district currently consists of parts of Baltimore County and Harford County. The district includes the communities of Bel Air North, Bel Air South, Bowleys Quarters, Edgewood, Fallston, Jarrettsville, Joppatowne, Kingsville, Middle River, Pleasant Hills, Rossville, and White Marsh. The district was established in 1975.

The district is represented by one State Senator and three State Delegates all of which serve four year terms elected during the Maryland Gubernatorial Elections.

== Demographic characteristics ==
As of the 2020 United States census, the district had a population of 140,902, of whom 109,881 (78.0%) were of voting age. The racial makeup of the district was 107,012 (75.9%) White, 16,188 (11.5%) African American, 377 (0.3%) Native American, 5,905 (4.2%) Asian, 47 (0.0%) Pacific Islander, 2,611 (1.9%) from some other race, and 8,755 (6.2%) from two or more races. Hispanic or Latino of any race were 6,335 (4.5%) of the population.

The district had 101,882 registered voters as of October 17, 2020, of whom 19,236 (18.9%) were registered as unaffiliated, 45,777 (44.9%) were registered as Republicans, 35,311 (34.7%) were registered as Democrats, and 907 (0.9%) were registered to other parties.

== Political representation ==
The district is represented for the 2023–2027 legislative term in the State Senate by J. B. Jennings (R) and in the House of Delegates by Kathy Szeliga (R, 7A), Ryan Nawrocki (R, 7A), and Lauren Arikan (R, 7B).

== Election history ==
Session	Senate	Delegates		
1975	Donald P. Hutchinson (D)	Peter J. Basilone (D)	Dennis F. Rasmussen (D)	Michael H. Weir Sr. (D)
1976	Donald P. Hutchinson (D)	Peter J. Basilone (D)	Dennis F. Rasmussen (D)	Michael H. Weir Sr. (D)
1977	Donald P. Hutchinson (D)	Peter J. Basilone (D)	Dennis F. Rasmussen (D)	Michael H. Weir Sr. (D)
1978	Donald P. Hutchinson (D)	James N. Hart (D)	Michael J. Collins (D)	Michael H. Weir Sr. (D)
1979	Dennis F. Rasmussen (D)	R. Terry Connelly	Michael J. Collins (D)	Michael H. Weir Sr. (D)
1980	Dennis F. Rasmussen (D)	R. Terry Connelly	Michael J. Collins (D)	Michael H. Weir Sr. (D)
1981	Dennis F. Rasmussen (D)	R. Terry Connelly	Michael J. Collins (D)	Michael H. Weir Sr. (D)
1982	Dennis F. Rasmussen (D)	R. Terry Connelly	Michael J. Collins (D)	Michael H. Weir Sr. (D)
1983	Norman R. Stone Jr. (D)	John S. Arnick (D)	Louis L. DePazzo (D)	Robert R. Staab (D)
1984	Norman R. Stone Jr. (D)	John S. Arnick (D)	Louis L. DePazzo (D)	Robert R. Staab (D)
1985	Norman R. Stone Jr. (D)	John S. Arnick (D)	Louis L. DePazzo (D)	Robert R. Staab (D)
1986	Norman R. Stone Jr. (D)	John S. Arnick (D)	Louis L. DePazzo (D)	Robert R. Staab (D)
1987	Norman R. Stone Jr. (D)	John S. Arnick (D)	Louis L. DePazzo (D)	Robert R. Staab (D)
1988	Norman R. Stone Jr. (D)	John S. Arnick (D)	Louis L. DePazzo (D)	Robert R. Staab (D)
1989	Norman R. Stone Jr. (D)	John S. Arnick (D)	Louis L. DePazzo (D)	Joseph J. Minnick (D)
1990	Norman R. Stone Jr. (D)	John S. Arnick (D)	Louis L. DePazzo (D)	Joseph J. Minnick (D)
1991	Norman R. Stone Jr. (D)	John S. Arnick (D)	Louis L. DePazzo (D)	Connie C. Galiazzo (D)
1992	Norman R. Stone Jr. (D)	Edward G. "Nipper" Schafer (D)	Louis L. DePazzo (D)	Connie C. Galiazzo (D)
1993	Norman R. Stone Jr. (D)	Edward G. "Nipper" Schafer (D)	Louis L. DePazzo (D)	Connie C. Galiazzo (D)
1994	Norman R. Stone Jr. (D)	John S. Arnick (D)	Louis L. DePazzo (D)	Connie C. Galiazzo (D)
1995	Norman R. Stone Jr. (D)	John S. Arnick (D)	Jacob J. Mohorovic Jr. (D)	Joseph J. Minnick (D)
1996	Norman R. Stone Jr. (D)	John S. Arnick (D)	Jacob J. Mohorovic Jr. (D)	Joseph J. Minnick (D)
1997	Norman R. Stone Jr. (D)	John S. Arnick (D)	Jacob J. Mohorovic Jr. (D)	Joseph J. Minnick (D)
1998	Norman R. Stone Jr. (D)	John S. Arnick (D)	Jacob J. Mohorovic Jr. (D)	Joseph J. Minnick (D)
1999	Norman R. Stone Jr. (D)	John S. Arnick (D)	Jacob J. Mohorovic Jr. (D)	Joseph J. Minnick (D)
2000	Norman R. Stone Jr. (D)	John S. Arnick (D)	Jacob J. Mohorovic Jr. (D)	Joseph J. Minnick (D)
2001	Norman R. Stone Jr. (D)	John S. Arnick (D)	Jacob J. Mohorovic Jr. (D)	Joseph J. Minnick (D)
2002	Norman R. Stone Jr. (D)	John S. Arnick (D)	Jacob J. Mohorovic Jr. (D)	Joseph J. Minnick (D)
2003	Andrew P. Harris (R)	Richard K. Impallaria (R)	J.B. Jennings (R)	Patrick L. McDonough (R)
2004	Andrew P. Harris (R)	Richard K. Impallaria (R)	J.B. Jennings (R)	Patrick L. McDonough (R)
2005	Andrew P. Harris (R)	Richard K. Impallaria (R)	J.B. Jennings (R)	Patrick L. McDonough (R)
2006	Andrew P. Harris (R)	Richard K. Impallaria (R)	J.B. Jennings (R)	Patrick L. McDonough (R)
2007	Andrew P. Harris (R)	Richard K. Impallaria (R)	J.B. Jennings (R)	Patrick L. McDonough (R)
2008	Andrew P. Harris (R)	Richard K. Impallaria (R)	J.B. Jennings (R)	Patrick L. McDonough (R)
2009	Andrew P. Harris (R)	Richard K. Impallaria (R)	J.B. Jennings (R)	Patrick L. McDonough (R)
2010	Andrew P. Harris (R)	Richard K. Impallaria (R)	J.B. Jennings (R)	Patrick L. McDonough (R)
2011	J.B. Jennings (R)	Richard K. Impallaria (R)	Kathy Szeliga (R)	Patrick L. McDonough (R)
2012	J.B. Jennings (R)	Richard K. Impallaria (R)	Kathy Szeliga (R)	Patrick L. McDonough (R)
2013	J.B. Jennings (R)	Richard K. Impallaria (R)	Kathy Szeliga (R)	Patrick L. McDonough (R)
2014	J.B. Jennings (R)	Richard K. Impallaria (R)	Kathy Szeliga (R)	Patrick L. McDonough (R)
2015	J.B. Jennings (R)	Richard K. Impallaria (R)	Kathy Szeliga (R)	Patrick L. McDonough (R)
2016	J.B. Jennings (R)	Richard K. Impallaria (R)	Kathy Szeliga (R)	Patrick L. McDonough (R)
2017	J.B. Jennings (R)	Richard K. Impallaria (R)	Kathy Szeliga (R)	Patrick L. McDonough (R)
2018	J.B. Jennings (R)	Richard K. Impallaria (R)	Kathy Szeliga (R)	Patrick L. McDonough (R)
2019	J.B. Jennings (R)	Richard K. Impallaria (R)	Kathy Szeliga (R)	Lauren Arikan (R)
2020	J.B. Jennings (R)	Richard K. Impallaria (R)	Kathy Szeliga (R)	Lauren Arikan (R)
2021	J.B. Jennings (R)	Richard K. Impallaria (R)	Kathy Szeliga (R)	Lauren Arikan (R)
2022	J.B. Jennings (R)	Richard K. Impallaria (R)	Kathy Szeliga (R)	Lauren Arikan (R)
2023	J.B. Jennings (R)	Ryan Nawrocki (R)	Kathy Szeliga (R)	Lauren Arikan (R)
2024	J.B. Jennings (R)	Ryan Nawrocki (R)	Kathy Szeliga (R)	Lauren Arikan (R)
2025	J.B. Jennings (R)	Ryan Nawrocki (R)	Kathy Szeliga (R)	Lauren Arikan (R)
2026	J.B. Jennings (R)	Ryan Nawrocki (R)	Kathy Szeliga (R)	Lauren Arikan (R)
2027	J.B. Jennings (R)	Ryan Nawrocki (R)	Kathy Szeliga (R)	Lauren Arikan (R)
2028	J.B. Jennings (R)	Ryan Nawrocki (R)	Kathy Szeliga (R)	Lauren Arikan (R)
2029	J.B. Jennings (R)	Ryan Nawrocki (R)	Kathy Szeliga (R)	Lauren Arikan (R)
2030	J.B. Jennings (R)	Ryan Nawrocki (R)	Kathy Szeliga (R)	Lauren Arikan (R)

== State Senate Elections Results ==
- 2014 General Election for Maryland State Senator – District 7

Voters to choose one:

Name	Votes	Percent	Outcome
J. B. Jennings, Rep.	36,913	74.6%	Won
Kim Letke	12,502	25.3%	Lost
Other Write-Ins	46	0.1%	Lost

- 2010 General Election for Maryland State Senator – District 7

Voters to choose one:

Name	Votes	Percent	Outcome
J. B. Jennings, Rep.	28,890	65.9%	Won
Rebecca Weir Nelson, Dem.	14,848	33.9%	Lost
Jim Stavropoulos, Jr. (Dem. write-in)	53	0.1%	Lost
Other Write-Ins	64	0.1%	Lost

== House of Delegates Election Results ==
- 2018 General Election for Maryland House of Delegates – District 7

Name	Votes	Percent	Outcome
Kathy Szeliga	38,617	25.4%	Won
Lauren Arikan	35,476	23.3%	Won
Richard K. Impallaria	34,223	22.5%	Won
Allison Berkowitz	19,550	12.8%	Lost
Gordon Koerner	15,614	10.3%	Lost
Ryan Sullivan	8,443	5.5%	Lost
Other Write-Ins	324	0.2%	Lost

- 2018 Republican Primary Election for Maryland House of Delegates - District 7

Voters to choose up to three:

Name	Votes	Percent	Outcome
Kathy Szeliga	7,127	23.3%	Won
Richard K. Impallaria	4,494	14.7%	Won
Lauren Arikan	4,173	13.6%	Won
Aaron Penman	3,216	10.5%	Lost
Bill Paulshock	2,869	9.4%	Lost
Michael Geppi	2,044	6.7%	Lost
David Seman	1,981	6.5%	Lost
Tammy Larkin	1,934	6.3%	Lost
Joshua Barlow	1,548	5.1%	Lost
Angela Sudano-Marcellino	498	1.6%	Lost
Russ English, Jr.	374	1.2%	Lost
Norm Gifford	219	0.7%	Lost
Trevor Leach	148	0.5%	Lost

- 2014 General Election for Maryland House of Delegates – District 7

Voters to choose three:

Name	Votes	Percent	Outcome
Pat McDonough, Rep.	35,627	26.9%	Won
Kathy Szeliga, Rep.	33,197	25.0%	Won
Richard Impallaria, Rep.	32,560	24.6%	Won
Bob Bowle, Jr., Dem.	11,154	8.4%	Lost
Norman Gifford, Jr., Dem.	10,192	7.7%	Lost
Pete Definbaugh, Dem.	9,707	7.3%	Lost
Other Write-Ins	145	0.1%	Lost

- 2014 Republican Primary Election for Maryland House of Delegates - District 7

Voters to choose up to three:

Name	Votes	Percent	Outcome
Pat McDonough	6,971	29.0%	Won
Kathy Szeliga	6,125	25.5%	Won
Richard K. Impallaria	5,790	24.1%	Won
David Seman	3,483	14.5%	Lost
Tina Sutherland	1,675	7.0%	Lost

- 2010 General Election for Maryland House of Delegates – District 7

Voters to choose three:

Name	Votes	Percent	Outcome
Richard Impallaria, Rep.	27,217	23.1%	Won
Pat McDonough, Rep.	25,450	21.6%	Won
Kathy Szeliga, Rep.	24,573	20.9%	Won
Jeff Beard, Dem.	14,885	12.6%	Lost
Kristina A. Sargent, Dem.	13,551	11.5%	Lost
James Ward Morrow, Dem.	11,960	10.2%	Lost
Other Write-Ins	111	0.1%	Lost

- 2010 Republican Primary Election for Maryland House of Delegates - District 7

Voters to choose up to three:

Name	Votes	Percent	Outcome
Pat McDonough	6,479	27.2%	Won
Richard K. Impallaria	5,678	23.8%	Won
Kathy Szeliga	4,021	16.9%	Won
Brian Bennett	1,838	7.7%	Lost
Marilyn Booker	1,808	7.6%	Lost
Roger Zajdel	1,783	7.5%	Lost
John Cromwell	1,031	4.3%	Lost
Jim Berndt	873	3.7%	Lost
Laine O. C. Clark	312	1.3%	Lost

- 2006 General Election for Maryland House of Delegates – District 7

Voters to choose up to three:

Name	Votes	Percent	Outcome
Richard K Impallaria, Rep.	21,333	18.7%	Won
J. B. Jennings, Rep.	21,189	18.6%	Won
Pat McDonough, Rep.	23,184	20.3%	Won
Linda W. Hart, Dem.	17,122	15.0%	Lost
Jack Sturgill, Dem.	15,390	13.5%	Lost
Rebecca L. Nelson, Dem.	13,481	11.8%	Lost
Kim Fell, Green	2,307	2.0%	Lost
Other Write-Ins	83	0.1%	Lost

- 2006 Republican Primary Election for House of Delegates - District 7

Voters to choose up to three:

Name	Votes	Percent	Outrcome
Pat McDonouogh	4,214	30.1%	Won
J.B. Jennings	3,798	27.1%	Won
Richard K. Impallaria	3,654	26.1%	Won
John T. Laing	1,499	10.7%	Lost
Nikolai Volkoff	845	6.0%	Lost

- 2002 General Election for Maryland House of Delegates – District 7

Voters to choose up to three:

Name	Votes	Percent	Outcome
J. B. Jennings, Rep.	22,470	20.4%	Won
Pat McDonough, Rep.	20,869	18.9%	Won
Richard Impallaria, Rep.	18,749	17.0%	Won
Nancy M. Hubers, Dem.	17,092	15.5%	Lost
Donna M. Felling, Dem.	14,205	12.9%	Lost
Randy Cogar, Dem.	13,926	12.6%	Lost
Michael F. Linder, Libertarian	2,817	2.6%	Lost
Other Write-Ins	80	0.1%	Lost

- 2002 Republican Primary Election for Maryland House of Delegates - District 7

Voters to choose up to three:

Name	Votes	Percent	Outcome
Pat McDonough	3,191	16.9%	Won
J.B. Jennings	3,126	16.5%	Won
Richard K. Impallaria	2,594	13.7%	Won
Sheryl L. Davis-Kohl	2,473	13.1%	Lost
Michael J. Davis	2,079	11.0%	Lost
Dilip B. Paliath	1,883	10.0%	Lost
Christopher Saffer	1,851	9.8%	Lost
Jackie Bailey	1,708	9.0%	Lost
