= Stephanie Kerschbaum =

American academic

- Born: 1977 (age 48–49)
- Title: Professor, Director of Program in Writing and Rhetoric

Academic background
- Education: University of Wisconsin–Madison (PhD, 2005)
- Thesis: Beyond simple inclusion: Towards engagement with difference in a postsecondary writing classroom (2005)
- Academic advisors: Deborah Brandt, David Fleming, Michael Bernand-Donals, Cecilia Ford, Martin Nystrand, Mary Louis Gomez

Academic work
- Discipline: Rhetoric and Composition
- Institutions: University of Washington

Stephanie L. Kerschbaum (born 1977) is an American academic in the fields of rhetoric, composition, and disability. She is a professor at the University of Washington, where she serves as the director of the Program in Writing and Rhetoric. She is the author of numerous articles, as well as the books Toward a New Rhetoric of Difference (2014) and Signs of Disability (2022), and co-editor of the book Negotiating Disability: Disclosure and Higher Education (2017). She is also editor for the National Council of Teachers of English's (NCTE) Studies in Writing and Rhetoric book series.

== Education ==
Kerschbaum received a Doctorate of Philosophy from the University of Wisconsin–Madison in 2005.

== Career ==
Kerschbaum published her first book, Toward a New Rhetoric of Difference, in 2014. It received the Advancement of Knowledge Award from the Conference on College Composition and Communication.

In 2017, she co-edited the book Negotiating Disability: Disclosure and Higher Education, which was published through the University of Michigan Press.

After receiving her doctorate, Kerschbaum worked at Texas A&M University and the University of Delaware, where she held a position as an associate professor of English and a faculty scholar with the Center for the Study of Diversity. In 2021, she took on a position as associate professor and director of the Expository Writing Program at the University of Washington.

That year, the Coalition of Feminist Scholars in the History of Rhetoric and Composition honored Kerschbaum with the Lisa Ede Mentoring Award, which recognizes individuals "with a career-record of mentorship [...]; leadership in campus, professional, and/or local communities; and other activities that align with the overall mission and goals of the Coalition". Along co-author Lauren Rosenberg, she won the Richard C. Ohmann Award from the NCTE for her article “Entanglements of Literacy Studies and Disability Studies."

In 2022, the edited collection Centering Diverse Bodyminds in Critical Qualitative Inquiry, for which Kerschbaum wrote a chapter, received a Critics' Choice Award from the Educational Studies Association. The same year, she published the book Signs of Disability with New York University Press.

Kerschbaum was promoted to professor in 2023.

She is also editor for the NCTE's Studies in Writing and Rhetoric book series.

== Personal life ==
Kerschbaum is deaf.

== Books ==
- Kerschbaum, Stephanie L. (2014). Toward a New Rhetoric of Difference. National Council of Teachers of English. ISBN 9780814154953.
- Kerschbaum, Stephanie L.; Eisenman, Laura T.; Jones, James M., eds. (2017). Negotiating disability: disclosure and higher education. Corporealities: discourses of disability. Ann Arbor: University of Michigan Press. ISBN 978-0-472-12339-1.
- Kerschbaum, Stephanie L. (2022). Signs of Disability. NYU Press. ISBN 9781479811182.
