= J. B. Jennings =

American politician (born 1974)

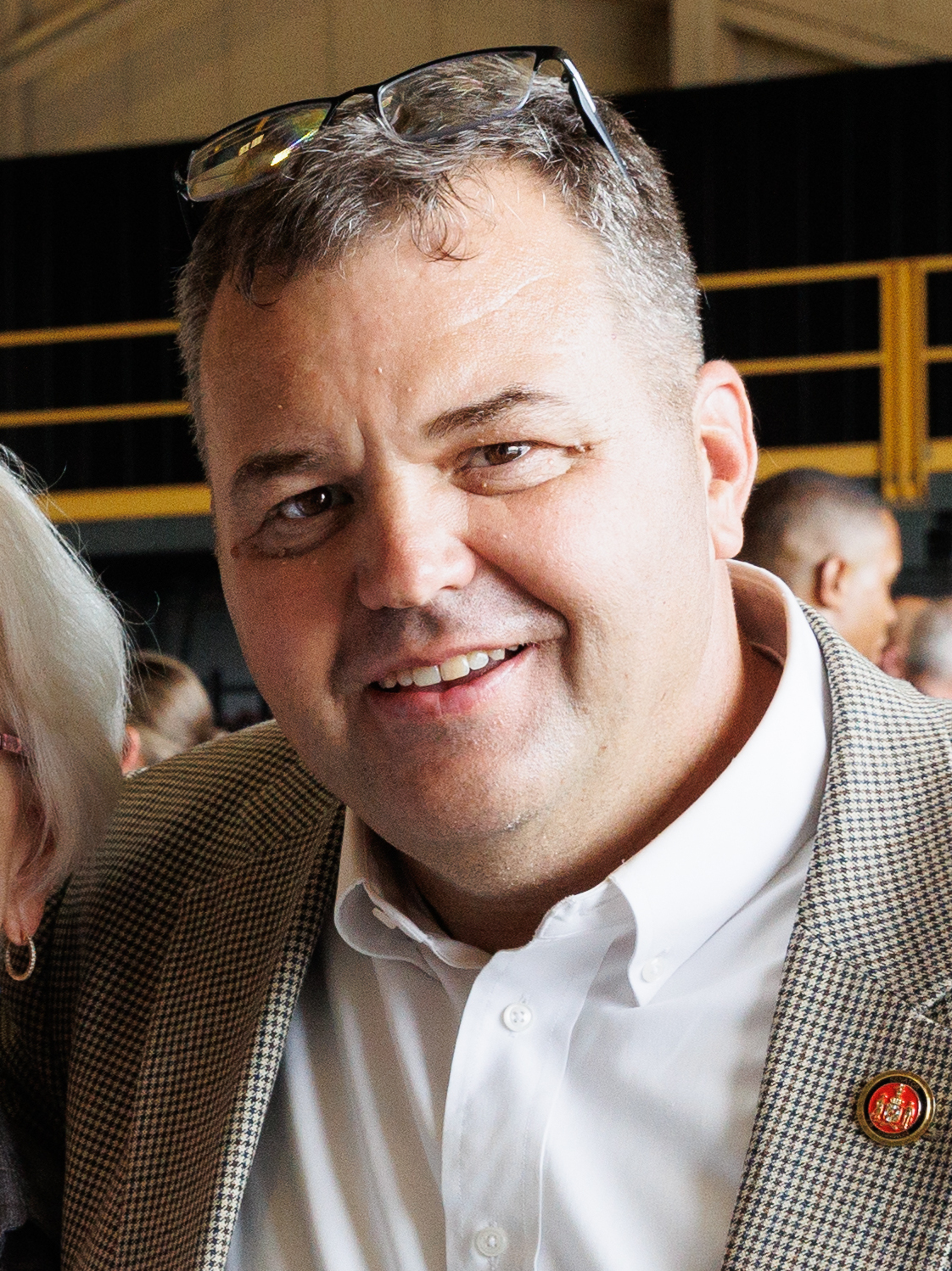
- Jennings in 2025

Member of the Maryland Senate from the 7th district
- Incumbent
- Assumed office January 12, 2011
- Preceded by: Andy Harris

Minority Leader of the Maryland Senate
- In office November 12, 2014 – October 10, 2020
- Preceded by: David R. Brinkley
- Succeeded by: Bryan Simonaire

Member of the Maryland House of Delegates from the 7th district
- In office January 8, 2003 – January 12, 2011
- Preceded by: Jacob Mohorovic
- Succeeded by: Kathy Szeliga

Personal details
- Born: Jonathan Bartlett Jennings; March 27, 1974 (age 52) Baltimore, Maryland, U.S.
- Party: Republican
- Spouse: Michelle Slusher
- Children: 2
- Education: Essex Community College (AA); University of Baltimore (BS)

Military service
- Branch/service: United States Air Force
- Years of service: 2008–present
- Rank: Airman 1st Class
- Unit: Maryland Air National Guard

Jonathan Bartlett Jennings (born March 27, 1974) is an American politician and farmer who has served as a member of the Maryland Senate representing the seventh district since 2011. A member of the Republican Party, he previously represented the district in the Maryland House of Delegates from 2003 to 2011, and served as the minority leader of the Senate from 2014 to 2020.

== Early life, education, and career ==
Jonathan Bartlett Jennings was born in Baltimore on March 27, 1974. He grew up in Phoenix, Maryland, and graduated from Dulaney High School, and later attended Essex Community College, where he earned an associate degree in 1995, and the University of Baltimore, where he earned a Bachelor of Science degree in business administration in 1997.

Jennings worked as a full-time Black Angus cattle farmer from 1992 to 2008, becoming a part-time beef and horse farmer after joining the Maryland Air National Guard. As an Airman 1st Class, he was activated for military service at Robins Air Force Base in Georgia during his first term as a state senator in 2011, causing him to miss the entire session. Jennings also co-owns the Mill of Hereford, an animal feed store, owns his own consulting company, and serves as a volunteer firefighter for the Jacksonville Volunteer Fire Company.

Jennings first became involved in politics as a staff assistant to U.S. Representative Bob Ehrlich from 1997 to 1998. He later worked on Ehrlich's 1998 re-election campaign and flew Ehrlich in his Piper PA-30 Twin Comanche to various locations during his 2002 gubernatorial campaign.

== In the legislature ==
Jennings ran for the Maryland House of Delegates in 2002, after being encouraged to do so by Ehrlich following a Maryland Court of Appeals decision that overturned Maryland's legislative redistricting plan. He ran on a platform that included issues involving school crowding and over-development. Jennings was sworn in on January 8, 2003. He served as a member of the Environmental Matters Committee and as a deputy minority whip from 2003 to 2006, afterwards serving in the Ways and Means Committee from 2007 to 2009 and the Judiciary Committee from 2009 to 2011.

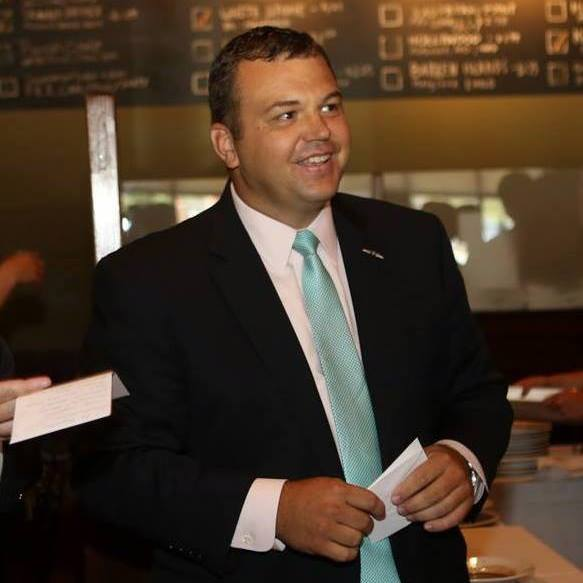
Jennings, c. 2015

In October 2009, after state senator Andy Harris announced that he would run for Congress in Maryland's 1st congressional district in 2010, Jennings entered the race to succeed him. In the Republican primary election, he faced former Maryland Insurance Commissioner Alfred W. Redmer Jr., whom he defeated with 61 percent of the vote.

Jennings was sworn into the Maryland Senate on January 12, 2011. He served as a member of the Health and Environmental Affairs Committee from 2011 to 2015, afterwards serving in the Finance Committee until 2023, when he was assigned to the Budget and Taxation Committee. In November 2014, after Senate minority leader David R. Brinkley was defeated in the Republican primary election, Senate Republicans voted to elect Jennings as the next minority leader. In this capacity, he pushed for legislation introduced by Governor Larry Hogan, which were generally business-friendly and against tax increases. Jennings served in this position until October 2020, when he opted against running for reelection.

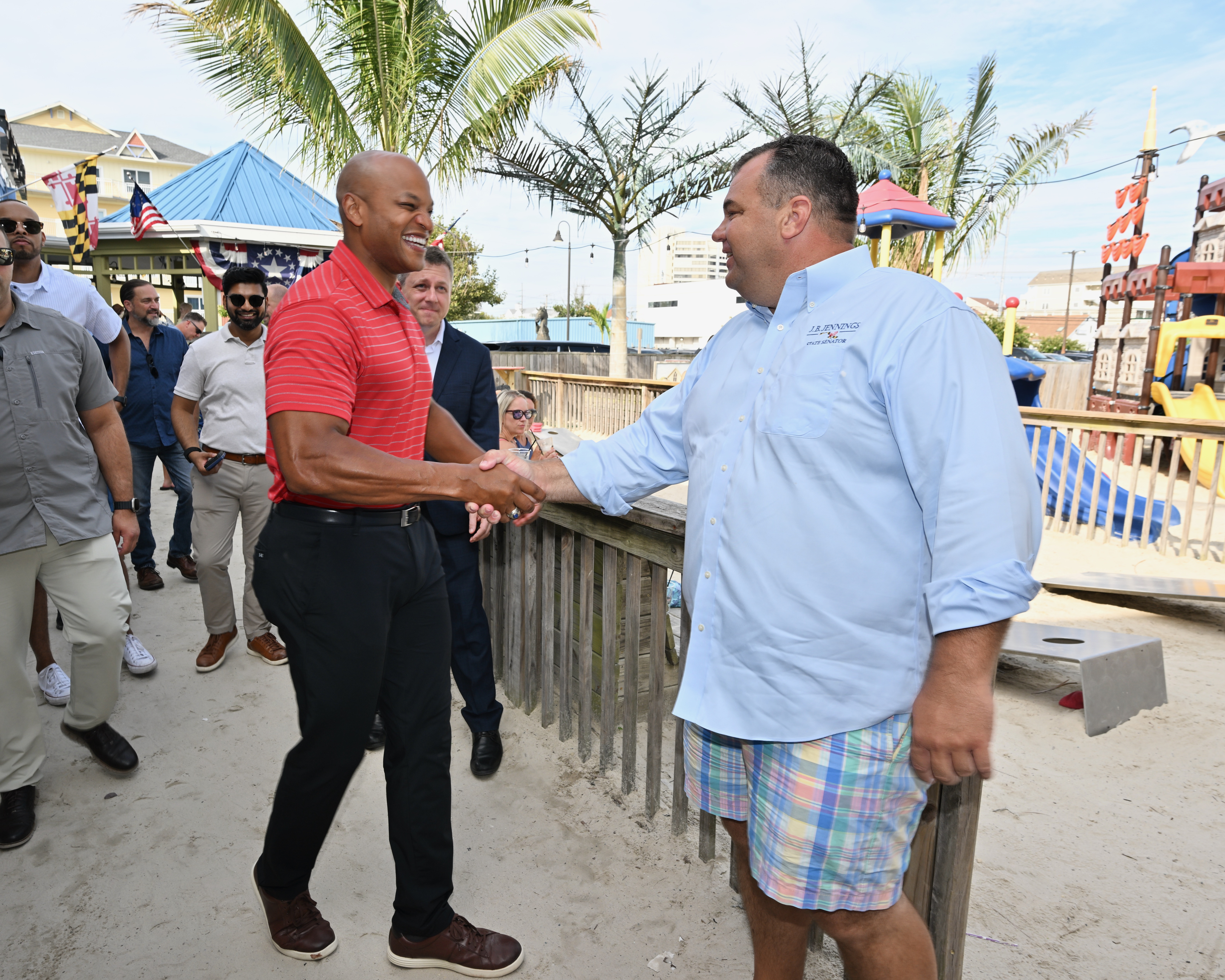
Jennings shakes hands with Governor Wes Moore at Ropewalk, 2023

During the annual Maryland Association of Counties conference in Ocean City, Jennings hosts an annual "gathering in the sand" at the Ropewalk restaurant. The bipartisan gathering has become one of the most popular events during the annual conference.

Jennings was a delegate to the 2016 Republican National Convention, pledged to businessman Donald Trump. In an interview with The Baltimore Sun following Maryland's presidential primaries, he said that he was neutral in the presidential election and held concerns about Trump and his communication style, but said he would support him as the party's nominee.

In February 2026, Jennings opposed the congressional redistricting plan proposed by the Governor's Redistricting Advisory Committee, which would redraw Maryland's 1st congressional district to improve the Democratic Party's chances of winning it. He criticized the governor's pressure on the senate to move forward with the plan, in particular without talking to all the senators.

== Political positions ==
=== Agriculture ===
During the 2009 legislative session, Jennings introduced legislation to allow farmers to sell raw milk to consumers who buy a "cow share".

=== Crime ===
During the 2020 legislative session, Jennings voted against overriding Governor Larry Hogan's veto of a bill that prevented businesses from asking job applicants about their criminal history before the first in-person interview. He also introduced a bill that would allow the governor to declare a state of emergency in Baltimore amid its high crime rates.

=== Development initiatives ===
In April 2026, during debate on the Utility RELIEF Act, Jennings introduced an amendment that would clarify rules requiring power companies to notify landowners and adjacent landowners who are in the path of a new power transmission line, citing poor communication on the proposed Maryland Piedmont Reliability Project power line. The amendment was adopted in a 20–19 vote.

In June 2026, Jennings supported the State of Maryland's acquisition of the intellectual rights to the Preakness Stakes.

=== Education ===
During the 2013 legislative session, Jennings was one of five Republicans to vote for a bill to provide $1 billion toward renovations to Baltimore public schools.

In March 2017, Jennings launched a filibuster against a bill to prohibit the state from using vouchers to improve struggling schools, during which he attempted to read off every page of the Every Student Succeeds Act. The filibuster was ended by Senate Democrats after an hour.

During the 2019 legislative session, Jennings opposed a bill that would restore control over school calendars to local boards of education, overturning an earlier executive order by Governor Larry Hogan that mandated a post-Labor Day start for school districts.

In September 2019, Jennings expressed concern with the Blueprint for Maryland's Future Funding Formula Workgroup—which was tasked with developing funding formulas for local school systems—was creating its formulas behind closed doors, saying that it would make people "lose trust in government". During the 2020 legislative session, he initially said that he would be willing to negotiate the education reforms proposed in the Blueprint for Maryland's Future and vowed to oppose any potential tax increases to pay for the reforms, but later said that legislators should delay passing the bill into the next year amid uncertainty with the COVID-19 pandemic. During debate on the bill, he introduced an amendment to minimize student-to-teacher ratios in public schools, which was adopted by the Senate.

=== Gambling ===
Jennings supports the expansion of gambling in Maryland, but voted against a bill in 2007 to create a statewide referendum on establishing casinos at five locations in the state, which he called "the hardest vote" he ever had to take.

=== Gun policy ===
Jennings opposes gun control laws, instead preferring reforms to mental health services.

During the 2013 legislative session, after a student was suspended for two days for making a gun-shaped pastry, Jennings introduced a bill to ban schools from suspending children who make gun gestures. He also opposed the Firearm Safety Act, a bill that placed restrictions on firearm purchases and magazine capacity in semi-automatic rifles, and attended a rally outside the Maryland State House to protest the legislation.

In 2019, after a staff member was shot inside Frederick Douglass High School, Jennings introduced a bill to allow school resource officers to carry guns inside school buildings.

=== Health care ===
Jennings supports providing full funding for the state's trauma care system, saying that he would put "everything on the table", including raising taxes, to increase funding for the services. He supports the decriminalization of marijuana and voted to legalize medical marijuana in 2014.

In 2018, Jennings supported a bill to impose a new tax on health insurers to help stabilize the state's healthcare marketplace.

During the 2021 legislative session, Jennings supported a bill banning medical debt collection agencies from garnishing the wages or placing liens on homes of people who owed medical debt, and limiting payments made toward medical debt at five percent of a person's income.

=== Social issues ===
During the 2006 legislative session, Jennings voted to overturn a committee vote to kill a bill proposing an amendment to the Constitution of Maryland to ban same-sex marriage in Maryland. The measure failed in a 61–78 vote. In 2012, he voted against the Civil Marriage Protection Act, which legalized same-sex marriage in Maryland. In 2019, during debate on a bill to allow residents to apply to a driver's license with the "X" gender identifier, Jennings expressed concern that the bill would cause confusion for police officers.

During the 2016 legislative session, Jennings expressed skepticism toward proposals to adopt automatic voter registration in Maryland. In June 2020, he wrote a letter to the Maryland State Board of Elections following Maryland's June 2 primary election, which was conducted largely using mail-in ballots, to express concern about potential voter fraud if mail-in ballots were used in the general election.

In 2018, Jennings criticized legislation to repeal "Maryland, My Maryland" as the state's official anthem as a "participation trophy bill", instead favoring a bill to replace the anthem's controversial pro-Confederate lyrics. During debate on the bill, he introduced an amendment to remove the bill's preamble, which called the song's lyrics "controversial, inappropriate, and do not represent the ideals and values of Marylanders today", which was rejected in a 25–21 vote. In March 2026, after Governor Wes Moore cited the "complicated history" of the Maryland flag during a podcast interview in February, Jennings introduced a bill that would create a referendum on enshrining the state flag into the Constitution of Maryland.

=== Taxes ===
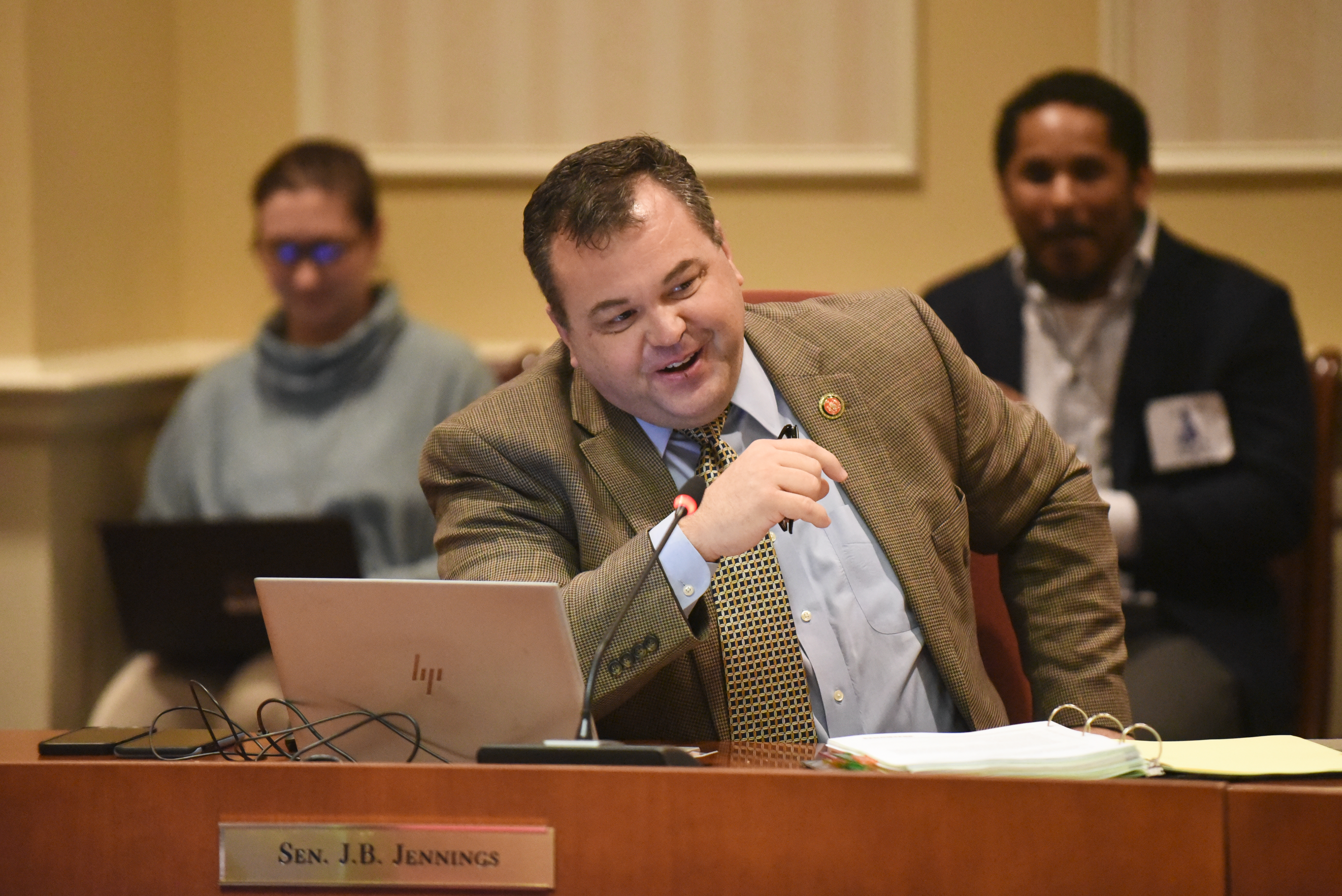
Jennings in the Budget and Taxation Committee, 2023

Jennings has described himself as a "guy who hates taxes". During the 2015 legislative session, he supported proposals by Governor Larry Hogan to repeal Maryland's "Rain Tax" and to create tax exemptions for businesses and retired service members.

=== Transportation ===
During the 2017 legislative session, Jennings supported legislation to repeal a law that required the state to use a scoring system to decide which transportation projects to prioritize, arguing that the system would cause urban transit projects to be prioritized over rural road projects.

== Personal life ==
Jennings is married to his wife, Michelle Slusher. Together, they have two children and live in Joppa, Maryland. In 2000, Jennings won in the White Marlin Open after reeling in a 158-pound shark, for which he was awarded $6,500.

In 2008, Jennings lost 51 pounds (20 kg) to enlist in the Maryland Air National Guard.

== Electoral history ==
Maryland House of Delegates District 7 Republican primary election, 2002
Party	Candidate	Votes	%
Republican	Pat McDonough	3,191	16.9
Republican	J. B. Jennings	3,191	16.9
Republican	Rick Impallaria	2,594	13.7
Republican	Sheryl L. Davis-Kohl	2,473	13.1
Republican	Michael J. Davis	2,079	11.0
Republican	Dilip B. Paliath	1,883	10.0
Republican	Christopher Saffer	1,851	9.8
Republican	Jackie Bailey	1,708	9.0

Maryland House of Delegates District 7 election, 2002
Party	Candidate	Votes	%
Republican	J. B. Jennings	22,470	20.4
Republican	Pat McDonough	20,869	18.9
Republican	Rick Impallaria	18,749	17.0
Democratic	Nancy M. Hubers	17,092	15.5
Democratic	Donna M. Felling	14,205	12.9
Democratic	Randy Cogar	13,926	12.6
Libertarian	Michael F. Linder	2,817	2.6
Write-in		80	0.1

Maryland House of Delegates District 7 election, 2006
Party	Candidate	Votes	%
Republican	Pat McDonough (incumbent)	23,184	20.3
Republican	Rick Impallaria (incumbent)	21,333	18.7
Republican	J. B. Jennings (incumbent)	21,189	18.6
Democratic	Linda W. Hart	17,122	15.0
Democratic	Jack Sturgill	15,390	13.5
Democratic	Rebecca L. Nelson	13,481	11.8
Green	Kim Fell	2,307	2.0
Write-in		83	0.1

Maryland Senate District 7 Republican primary election, 2010
Party	Candidate	Votes	%
Republican	J. B. Jennings	5,547	61.0
Republican	Alfred W. Redmer Jr.	3,547	39.0

Maryland Senate District 7 election, 2010
Party	Candidate	Votes	%
Republican	J. B. Jennings	28,890	65.9
Democratic	Rebecca Weir Nelson	14,848	33.9
Write-in		117	0.2

Maryland Senate District 7 election, 2014
Party	Candidate	Votes	%
Republican	J. B. Jennings (incumbent)	36,913	74.6
Democratic	Kim Letke	12,502	25.3
Write-in		46	0.1

Maryland Senate District 7 election, 2018
Party	Candidate	Votes	%
Republican	J. B. Jennings (incumbent)	40,070	66.9
Democratic	Donna Hines	19,780	33.0
Write-in		69	0.1

Maryland Senate District 7 election, 2022
Party	Candidate	Votes	%
Republican	J. B. Jennings (incumbent)	37,513	96.0
Write-in		1,555	4.0

Maryland Senate
Preceded by Andy Harris	Member of the Maryland Senate from the 7th district 2011–present	Incumbent
Preceded by David R. Brinkley	Minority Leader of the Maryland Senate; 2014–2021	Succeeded by Bryan Simonaire
