= Wildlife Protection Act of 2010 =

Statute enacted by the government of the District of Columbia

The Wildlife Protection Act of 2010 is a statute enacted by the government of the District of Columbia (which is coterminous with the United States capital city of Washington). The Act was adopted by the Council of the District of Columbia on 2010 October 5.

Controversy began developing as critics of the law alleged that it protected rats without regard to their effects on the human population, a strident opponent from the outset being the Wildlife Society. The controversy broadened in early 2012 amid concerns about the prevalence of rats in the vicinity of the Occupy DC camp in the District of Columbia. Concerns were voiced by Maryland legislator Pat McDonough (R-Baltimore).

One commentator referred to the Act as providing "Right to Life for Rodents"! The controversy went national when it was aired by Rush Limbaugh and soon picked up as well by Huffington Post.

District of Columbia Council Member Mary Cheh (D), author of the Act, spoke on Fox News, claiming that critics' statements misrepresented it.
