= Baltimore County Delegation =

Delegation in the Maryland General Assembly

The Baltimore County Delegation refers to the members of the Maryland House of Delegates who reside in or represent legislative districts that include parts of Baltimore County, Maryland in the United States of America. Three delegates are elected from each district, though some districts are divided into sub-districts.

== Current members ==
As of 2023, the current members of the Baltimore County Delegation are:

=== Senate ===
District	Counties represented	Senator	Party	First elected	Committee
6	Baltimore County	Johnny Ray Salling	Republican	2014	Budget and Taxation
7	Baltimore County, Harford	J. B. Jennings	Republican	2010	Budget and Taxation
8	Baltimore County	Katherine A. Klausmeier	Democratic	2002	Finance
10	Baltimore County	Benjamin Brooks	Democratic	2022	Education, Energy, and the Environment
11	Baltimore County	Shelly L. Hettleman	Democratic	2020	Budget and Taxation
42	Baltimore County, Carroll	Chris West	Republican	2018	Judicial Proceedings

=== House of Delegates ===
District	Counties represented	Delegate	Party	First elected	Committee
6	Baltimore County	Robin Grammer Jr.	Republican	2014	Judiciary
6	Baltimore County	Robert B. Long	Republican	2014	Ways and Means
6	Baltimore County	Ric Metzgar	Republican	2014	Ways and Means
7A	Baltimore County	Kathy Szeliga	Republican	2010	Health and Government Operations
7A	Baltimore County	Ryan Nawrocki	Republican	2022	Environment and Transportation
8	Baltimore County	Nick Allen	Democratic	2022	Environment and Transportation
8	Baltimore County	Harry Bhandari	Democratic	2018	Health and Government Operations
8	Baltimore County	Carl W. Jackson	Democratic	2019	Environment and Transportation
10	Baltimore County	Adrienne A. Jones	Democratic	1997	Speaker
10	Baltimore County	N. Scott Phillips	Democratic	2022	Judiciary
10	Baltimore County	Jennifer White Holland	Democratic	2022	Health and Government Operations
11A	Baltimore County	Cheryl Pasteur	Democratic	2022	Judiciary
11B	Baltimore County	Jon S. Cardin	Democratic	2018	Judiciary
11B	Baltimore County	Dana Stein	Democratic	2006	Environment and Transportation
42A	Baltimore County	Nino Mangione	Republican	2018	Appropriations
42B	Baltimore County	Michele Guyton	Democratic	2018	Environment and Transportation
43B	Baltimore County	Cathi Forbes	Democratic	2019	Appropriations
44A	Baltimore County	Eric Ebersole	Democratic	2014	Ways and Means
44B	Baltimore County	Aletheia McCaskill	Democratic	2022	Appropriations
44B	Baltimore County	Sheila Ruth	Democratic	2020	Environment and Transportation

== Former members ==
District	Member	Party	Years	Lifespan
10	Jay Jalisi	Democratic	2015–2023	1965–present
11	Delores G. Kelley	Democratic	1991–2023	1936–present
44B	Pat Young	Democratic	2015–2023	1983–present
11	Robert Zirkin	Democratic	2007–2020	1971–present
42	James Brochin	Democratic	2003–2019	1964–present
8	Eric M. Bromwell	Democratic	2003–2019	1976–present
42A	Stephen W. Lafferty	Democratic	2007–2019	1949–present
11	Dan K. Morhaim	Democratic	1995–2019	1948–present
44	Shirley Nathan-Pulliam	Democratic	1995–2019	1939–present
12A	Steven J. DeBoy Sr.	Democratic	2003–2015	1956–present
6	Joseph J. Minnick	Democratic	1988–1990; 1995–2015	1933–2015
6	Johnny Olszewski	Democratic	2006–2015	1982–present
6	Norman R. Stone Jr.	Democratic	1963–2015	1935–present
5B	A. Wade Kach	Republican	1975–2014	1947–present
12A	James E. Malone Jr.	Democratic	1995–2014	1957–present
6	John S. Arnick	Democratic	1967–1979; 1983–1992; 1993–2006	1933–2006
8	Thomas L. Bromwell	Democratic	1983–2002	1949–present
6	Michael J. Collins	Democratic	1978–2002	1940–present
8	Joseph Bartenfelder	Democratic	1983–1994	1957–present
4	William Rush	Democratic	1963–1982	1919–2000
4	J. William Hinkel	Democratic	1967–1970	1932–2009

== See also ==
- Current members of the Maryland House of Delegates
