= Louis Einschutz =

American politician (1922–1994)

Louis E. Einschutz

Member of the Maryland House of Delegates from the 9th district
- In office 1975 – July 1, 1977 Serving with George E. Heffner, William Rush
- Succeeded by: John W. Seling

Member of the Maryland House of Delegates from the 6th district
- In office 1967–1974 Serving with George E. Heffner, William Rush, William T. Evans

Personal details
- Born: December 11, 1922 Baltimore, Maryland, U.S.
- Died: October 25, 1994 (aged 71)
- Resting place: Gardens of Faith Cemetery
- Party: Democratic
- Spouse: Daisy P. Evans
- Children: 2
- Education: Johns Hopkins University
- Occupation: Politician

Louis E. Einschutz (December 11, 1922 – October 25, 1994) was an American politician from Maryland. He served as a member of the Maryland House of Delegates from 1967 to 1977, representing the 6th District from 1967 to 1974 and the 9th District from 1975 to 1977.

== Early life ==
Louis E. Einschutz was born on December 11, 1922, in Baltimore. He attended public schools in Baltimore. Einschutz attended Johns Hopkins University for engineering. He reported in the 1973-74 Maryland Manual that he had graduated with a degree in 1959, but he did not receive a degree.

== Career ==
Einschutz served in the United States Army from 1943 to 1945. He worked as a supervisor at Bethlehem Steel and as an electrical contractor.

Einschutz was a Democrat. He served as a member of the Maryland House of Delegates from 1967 to 1977, representing the 6th District from 1967 to 1974 and the 9th District from 1975 to 1977. He resigned on July 1, 1977, and was succeeded by John W. Seling.

Einschutz was appointed to the Maryland Parole Commission in 1977. In 1978, Einschutz asked for a leave of absence to run for Baltimore County Executive, but the request was declined by Governor Blair Lee III and he dropped out of the race. His term with the Maryland Parole Commission expired in June 1981.

== Personal life ==
Einschutz married Daisy P. Evans. He had one son and daughter, Louis E. Jr. and Terry.

Einschutz died on October 25, 1994. He was buried at Gardens of Faith Cemetery.
