= Seling (disambiguation) =

Seling may refer to:

== People ==
- John W. Seling (died 1986), American politician
- Paula Seling (born 1978), Romanian singer

== Places ==
- Seling, town in India

== Other uses ==
- Seling v. Young, American court case

== See also ==
- Josef Antonín Sehling (1710–1756), Bohemian composer and violinist
