= William T. Evans (politician) =

American politician and judge (1925–1991)

Member of the Maryland House of Delegates from the 6th district
- In office 1967–1973 Serving with Louis Einschutz and William Rush
- Succeeded by: George E. Heffner

Personal details
- Born: February 14, 1925 Newton Falls, Ohio, U.S.
- Died: October 19, 1991 (aged 66) Edgewood, Maryland, U.S.
- Resting place: Oak Lawn Cemetery
- Party: Democratic
- Spouse(s): Mary Elaine Smith (died 1987) Rita Boyle Hayden
- Children: 3
- Education: University of Baltimore (AA); University of Baltimore School of Law (JD)
- Occupation: Politician; judge

William T. Evans (February 14, 1925 – October 19, 1991) was an American politician and judge from Maryland. He served as a member of the Maryland House of Delegates, representing District 6 from 1967 to 1973.

== Early life ==
William T. Evans was born on February 14, 1925, Newton Falls, Ohio. As a child, his family moved to Dundalk, Maryland. He graduated from Sparrows Point High School in 1943. He graduated from the University of Baltimore with an Associate of Arts in 1949. He graduated with a Juris Doctor from the University of Baltimore School of Law in 1952. He was admitted to the bar in Maryland in 1952.

== Career ==
During World War II, Evans served as a bombardier in the United States Army Air Forces in the Pacific Ocean theater. He reached the rank of first lieutenant.

After the war, Evans worked as an insurance adjuster for USF&G. In 1952, he began practicing law in Dundalk. From 1959 to 1961, Evans served as trial magistrate in the Sparrows Point Court and as a member of the Baltimore County Planning Board.

Evans was a Democrat. He served as a member of the Maryland House of Delegates, representing 6th, from 1967 until his resignation in 1973. George E. Heffner was appointed to replace him.

Evans became an administrative judge with the district court in District 8. He was appointed to a ten-year term starting on April 12, 1972. Evans retired from the court in 1985, but still heard cases until September 3, 1991.

== Personal life ==
Evans married Mary Elaine Smith. They were married for 44 years and she died in 1987. He then married Rita Boyle Hayden. He had three sons, William R., James C. and Thomas L. He also had two stepsons and a stepdaughter, Grant, Thomas and Dhorey. Around 1990, Evans moved from Dundalk to Edgewood. He also owned a home in Winter Haven, Florida.

Evans died of cancer on October 19, 1991, at his home in Edgewood. He was buried at Oak Lawn Cemetery.
