= George E. Heffner =

American politician (1923–2008)

Member of the Maryland House of Delegates from the 9th district
- In office 1975–1978 Serving with Louis E. Einschutz, William Rush, John W. Seling

Member of the Maryland House of Delegates from the 6th district
- In office 1973–1974 Serving with Louis E. Einschutz and William Rush
- Preceded by: William T. Evans

Personal details
- Born: March 18, 1923 Fullerton, Baltimore County, Maryland, U.S.
- Died: October 8, 2008 (aged 85) Kingsville, Maryland, U.S.
- Resting place: Gardens of Faith Cemetery; Rosedale, Maryland, U.S.
- Party: Democratic
- Spouse: Evelyn Ashley
- Occupation: Politician; mechanic; public official

George E. Heffner (March 18, 1923 – October 8, 2008) was an American politician from Maryland. He served as a member of the Maryland House of Delegates, representing District 6 from 1973 to 1974 and District 9 from 1975 to 1978.

== Early life ==
George E. Heffner was born on March 18, 1923, in Fullerton, Baltimore County, Maryland. He attended St. Joseph, a parochial school in Baltimore County. He left school to support his family after his father died.

== Career ==
Heffner served in the United States Navy as a mechanic during World War II. He worked as a trial magistrate from 1963 to 1967. He was chief license inspector in Baltimore County from 1967 to 1969 and served as police magistrate in Rosedale, Maryland, from 1969 to 1972. He owned Putty Hill Garage and Towing for a number of years and sold it to his cousin in the 1970s.

Heffner was a Democrat. In 1973, Heffner was appointed as a member of the Maryland House of Delegates, representing District 6, following the resignation of William T. Evans. He represented District 6 until 1974. He represented District 9 in the Maryland House of Delegates from 1975 to 1978.

Heffner was a champion of the Free State Stock Racing Association in 1953, 1954 and 1955.

== Personal life ==
Heffner married Evelyn Ashley. He had one stepson, Carl Wayne DeHaven Jr. Heffner died on October 8, 2008, in Kingsville, Maryland. He was buried at Gardens of Faith Cemetery in Rosedale.
