= William Rush (politician) =

American politician (1919–2000)

Member of the Maryland House of Delegates from the 9th district
- In office 1975–1982 Serving with Louis Einschutz, George E. Heffner, John W. Seling, Thomas L. Bromwell, William J. Burgess
- Succeeded by: Donald K. Hughes; Thomas B. Kernan; Martha Scanlan Klima

Member of the Maryland House of Delegates from the 6th district
- In office 1967–1974 Serving with Louis Einschutz, George E. Heffner, William T. Evans

Member of the Maryland House of Delegates from the Baltimore County district
- In office 1963–1966

Personal details
- Born: November 3, 1919 Belfast, Ireland
- Died: August 5, 2000 (aged 80) Parkville, Maryland, U.S.
- Resting place: Bel Air Memorial Gardens; Bel Air, Maryland, U.S.
- Party: Democratic (1963–1982); Republican (1990)
- Spouse: Alvera M. Class (m. 1941)
- Children: 2
- Occupation: Politician; soccer player; businessman
- Nickname: Willie

William Rush (November 3, 1919 – August 5, 2000), better known as Willie Rush, was an American politician and soccer player from Maryland. He served as a member of the Maryland House of Delegates from 1963 to 1982, representing the Baltimore County district from 1963 to 1966, the 6th District from 1967 to 1974 and the 9th District from 1975 to 1982.

== Early life ==
William Rush was born on November 3, 1919, in Belfast, Ireland. His father was an ironworker that immigrated to the United States. They moved to Baltimore, but would move again to Glen Arm. He attended public schools in Belfast and Baltimore County, Maryland. He attended Towson High School, but dropped out to work as an ironworker.

== Career ==
Rush served in the United States Army during World War II. He worked as a construction superintendent during the war and served in the Philippines. He was an instructor at the Officer Candidate School from 1943 to 1944. He was captain of the Armed Forces Soccer Team from 1945 to 1946.

In the 1940s and 1950s, Rush was a player on the Baltimore Rockets and the Baltimore Americans soccer teams. In the 1950s, Rush opened Parkville Tavern with his friend Joe Buck. He owned a realty company and was vice president of the Baltimore County Tavern and Restaurant Owners Association.

Rush was a Democrat. He served as a member of the Maryland House of Delegates from 1963 to 1982, representing the Baltimore County district from 1963 to 1966, the 6th District from 1967 to 1974 and the 9th District from 1975 to 1982. He was a delegate to the 1967 Maryland Constitutional Convention. He served as chair of the alcoholic beverages committee from 1967 to 1982 and was chair of the Baltimore City delegation in 1974. In his last session, Rush introduced a bill to re-introduce public whipping for some offenses, but the bill did not succeed.

Later in life, Rush became a Republican. He ran as a Republican for the 8th District of the Maryland House of Delegates in 1990. He lost to Democratic incumbent Thomas L. Bromwell.

== Personal life ==
Rush married Alvera Mary Class in 1941. They had two children, Carol and Bob. He lived in Parkville, Maryland. He often went by the nickname Willie.

Rush died of a heart attack on August 5, 2000, at his home in Parkville. He was buried at Bel Air Memorial Gardens.
