= Bob Long (politician) =

American politician (born 1957)

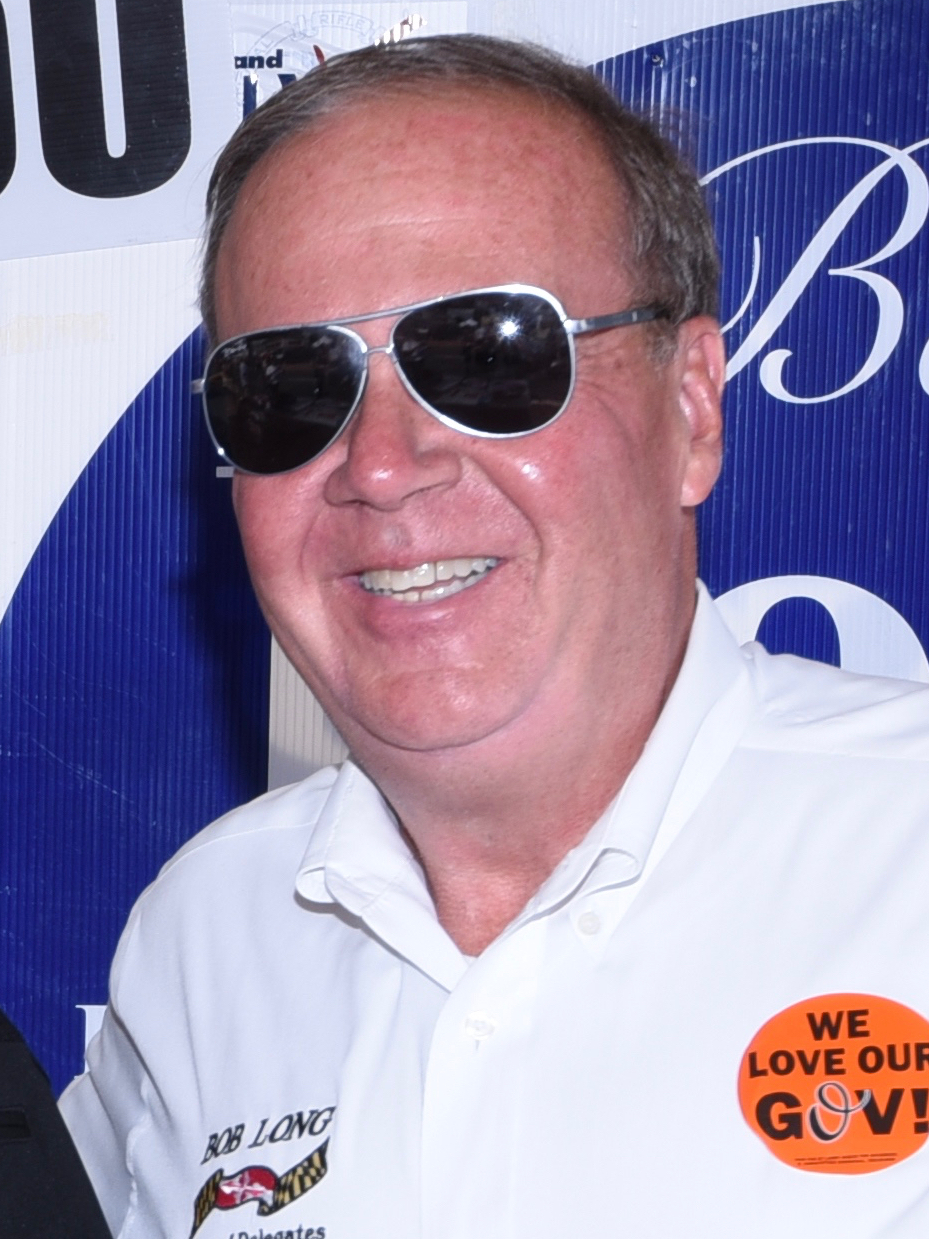
- Long in 2017

Member of the Maryland House of Delegates from the 6th district
- Incumbent
- Assumed office January 14, 2015 Serving with Robin Grammer Jr., Richard W. Metzgar
- Preceded by: Joseph J. Minnick

Personal details
- Born: January 11, 1957 (age 69) Baltimore, Maryland, U.S.
- Party: Republican
- Children: 4

Robert B. Long (born January 11, 1957) is an American politician who has served as a member of the Maryland House of Delegates from the sixth district since 2015.

== Early life and career ==
Long was born in Baltimore, Maryland on January 11, 1957. He was raised by a single mother. Long attended Essex Community College and the Community College of Baltimore County before becoming a GRI-designated realtor for Covenant Realty. He is also a former union truck driver.

Long is a member of the Maryland Association of Realtors, the Greater Baltimore Board of Realtors, the Henrietta Lacks Legacy Group, and the National Rifle Association of America. He first ran for the Maryland House of Delegates in 2010, but was defeated by incumbents Johnny Olszewski, Joseph J. Minnick, and Michael H. Weir Jr. in the general election.

Long is married and has four children.

== In the legislature ==
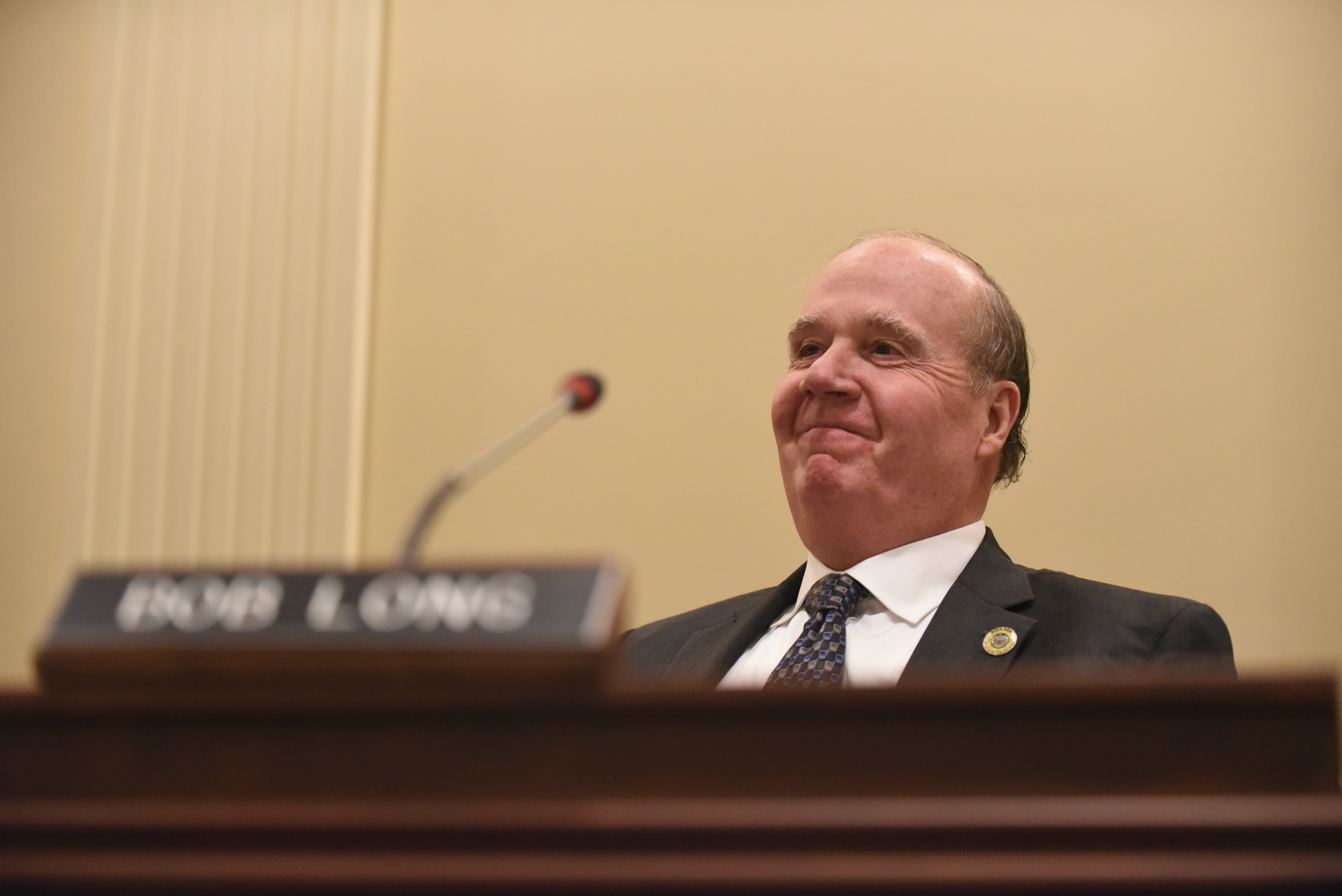
Long in the Ways and Means Committee, 2023

Long was elected to the Maryland House of Delegates alongside Republicans Robin Grammer Jr. and Richard W. Metzgar in the 2014 Maryland House of Delegates election, during which the three ran on a platform involving economic issues. He was sworn in on January 14, 2015, and has served as a member of the Ways and Means Committee during his entire tenure. Long keeps a brick from the former Sparrows Point steel mill on his desk as a reminder "of where we've been and where we have to go".

== Political positions ==
=== Education ===
During the 2019 legislative session, Long introduced a bill that would fine parents $1,000 if their child gets into trouble at school four times. In 2023, he introduced the Parent and Guardian Accountability Act, which would require parents to participate in counseling with their student after repeating a notice of repeated disruptive behavior during school hours.

=== Environment ===
In August 2022, Long signed onto a letter asking Governor Larry Hogan to keep the Back River Wastewater Treatment Plant under the Maryland Environmental Service's control, expressing concerns that the plant would "resort back to mismanagement" if given back to the city of Baltimore.

=== Fiscal issues ===
During the 2018 legislative session, Long supported legislation to provide $8.5 billion in tax incentives to Amazon to build their second headquarters in Montgomery County, hoping that Amazon locating in Maryland would bring jobs to his district.

In 2020, Long expressed concerns with a bill to impose a six percent tax on "luxury services" and lobbied to have "marina services" removed from the luxury services defined in the bill.

=== Immigration ===
During the 2026 legislative session, Long opposed legislation banning counties from entering into 287(g) program agreement with U.S. Immigration and Customs Enforcement, saying that the state "should fully cooperate with ICE agents. We need their help to identify criminals."

=== National politics ===
In November 2016, Long condemned a tape recording of a vulgar discussion Donald Trump had on Access Hollywood in 2005 about groping and trying to have sex with women, calling it "disgusting and inappropriate". He supported Trump in the 2016 United States presidential election, expressing optimism that he would bring manufacturing jobs back to his district as president.

=== Social issues ===
During the 2021 legislative session, Long introduced legislation that would extend state hate crime protections to first responders.

In 2023, during debate on a bill to establish the state's recreational marijuana industry, Long introduced an amendment that would prevent occupants of a motor vehicle from smoking cannabis near a minor. The amendment was rejected in a 40-97 vote.

In December 2025, Long opposed overriding Governor Wes Moore's veto of a bill to study reparations to victims of slavery or their descendants in Maryland, citing the state's budget deficit and pointing to several prior commissions regarding reparations in Maryland.

=== Voting rights ===
In August 2026, during debate on a proposed constitutional amendment on redistricting, Long introduced amendments that would require voter identification to vote in Maryland elections, and to restrict mail-in ballots and require voters to provide a reason to receive an absentee ballot.

== Electoral history ==
Maryland House of Delegates District 6 Republican primary election, 2010
Party	Candidate	Votes	%
Republican	Ric Metzgar	2,775	36.3
Republican	Robert B. Long	2,584	33.8
Republican	Carlton William Clendaniel	2,291	29.9

Maryland House of Delegates District 6 election, 2010
Party	Candidate	Votes	%
Democratic	Johnny Olszewski (incumbent)	16,278	20.2
Democratic	Michael H. Weir Jr. (incumbent)	14,618	18.2
Democratic	Joseph J. Minnick (incumbent)	14,405	17.9
Republican	Robert B. Long	12,999	16.2
Republican	Ric Metzgar	12,480	15.5
Republican	Carlton William Clendaniel	9,612	11.9
Write-in		79	0.1

Maryland House of Delegates District 6 Republican primary election, 2014
Party	Candidate	Votes	%
Republican	Robert B. Long	2,139	24.4
Republican	Ric Metzgar	1,707	19.5
Republican	Robin Grammer Jr.	1,224	14.0
Republican	Roger Zajdel	994	11.3
Republican	Domenico "Dan" Liberatore	860	9.8
Republican	Mitchell J. Toland, Jr.	701	8.0
Republican	Carl H. Magee, Jr.	577	6.6
Republican	Gary Sparks	450	5.1
Republican	Jerzy Samotyj	122	1.4

Maryland House of Delegates District 6 election, 2014
Party	Candidate	Votes	%
Republican	Robert B. Long	16,796	21.2
Republican	Ric Metzgar	15,176	19.1
Republican	Robin L. Grammer Jr.	14,582	18.4
Democratic	Nicholas C. D'Adamo, Jr.	11,599	14.6
Democratic	Michael H. Weir Jr. (incumbent)	11,503	14.5
Democratic	Jake Mohorovic	9,526	12.0
Write-in		97	0.1

Maryland House of Delegates District 6 election, 2018
Party	Candidate	Votes	%
Republican	Robert B. Long (incumbent)	18,291	19.7
Republican	Robin L. Grammer Jr. (incumbent)	18,084	19.5
Republican	Ric Metzgar (incumbent)	17,803	19.2
Democratic	Nicholas C. D'Adamo, Jr.	12,847	13.9
Democratic	Megan Ann Mioduszewski	12,213	13.2
Democratic	Diane DeCarlo	12,000	12.9
Libertarian	Michael J. Lyden	1,459	1.6
Write-in		59	0.1

Maryland House of Delegates District 6 election, 2022
Party	Candidate	Votes	%
Republican	Ric Metzgar (incumbent)	16,696	23.6
Republican	Robin L. Grammer Jr. (incumbent)	16,344	23.1
Republican	Robert B. Long (incumbent)	15,987	22.6
Democratic	Megan Ann Mioduszewski	11,300	16.0
Democratic	Jake Mohorovic III	10,109	14.3
Write-in		304	0.4
