= Richard W. Metzgar =

American politician (born 1953)

Ric Metzgar
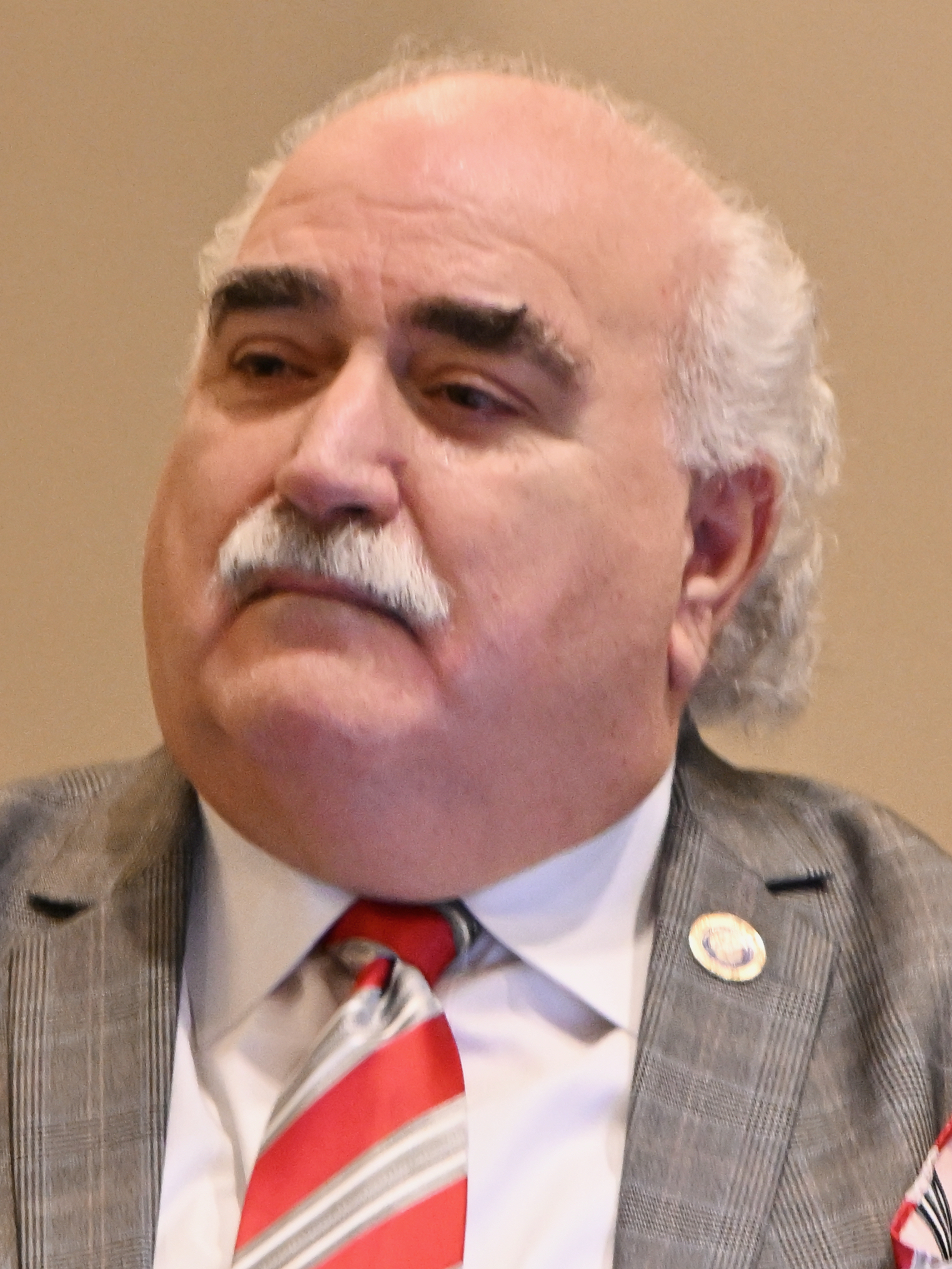
- Metzgar in 2023

Member of the Maryland House of Delegates from the 6th district
- Incumbent
- Assumed office January 14, 2015 Serving with Robin Grammer Jr., Robert B. Long
- Preceded by: Michael H. Weir Jr.

Personal details
- Born: November 28, 1953 (age 72) Essex, Maryland, U.S.
- Party: Republican
- Children: 2

Richard W. Metzgar (born November 28, 1953) is an American politician who has served as a member of the Maryland House of Delegates from the sixth district since 2015.

== Early life and career ==
Metzgar was born and raised in Essex, Maryland, on November 28, 1953. His father worked for the Glenn L. Martin Company and his mother owned a dry cleaning business and worked for the Maryland Republican Party. Metzgar graduated from Kenwood High School and attended Northwest Bible College and later earned a clinical pastoral education certificate from the Community College of Baltimore County.

Metzgar worked as the general manager of G & W Motors from 1989 to 2015 and as the president of My Son's Parking, Inc. from 1994 to 1998. Metzgar also started the Gateway Pastors and Churches Association and served as a ministry leader for several area churches and as an associate pastor at Essex Church of God from 2004 to 2014.

In 2006 and 2010, Metzgar was an unsuccessful candidate for the Maryland House of Delegates in District 6. During his 2010 candidacy, he ran on a platform involving environmental and economic issues, including deregulation, pollution, and public safety.

== In the legislature ==
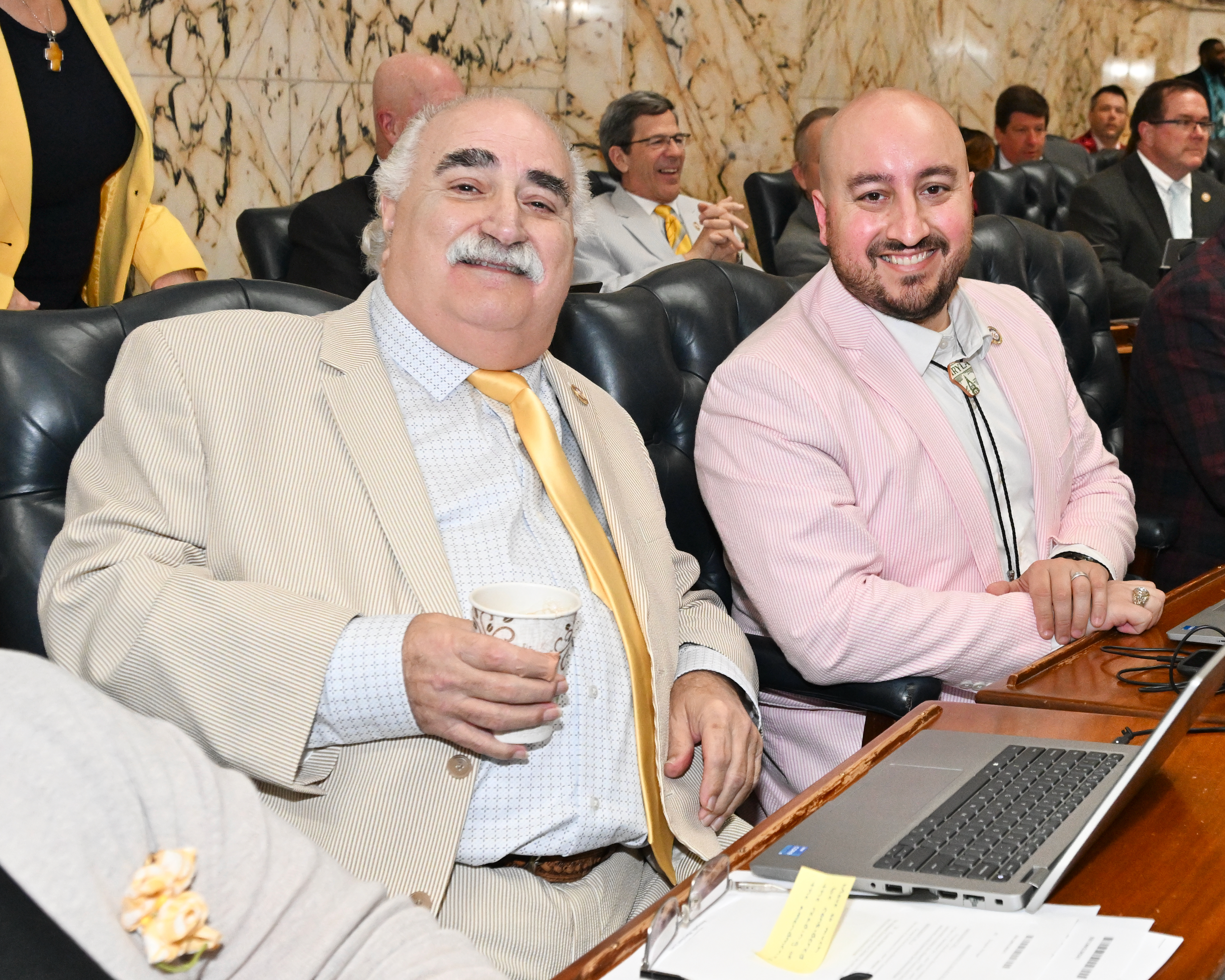
Metzgar and Nick Allen on the House floor, 2024

Metzgar was elected to the Maryland House of Delegates alongside Republicans Robin Grammer Jr. and Robert B. Long in the 2014 Maryland House of Delegates election, during which the three ran on a platform involving economic issues. He was sworn in on January 14, 2015. Metzgar was a member of the Ways and Means Committee from 2015 to 2017, afterwards serving in the Health and Government Operations Committee until 2019. He has since served as a member of the Appropriations Committee.

In July 2015, after Governor Larry Hogan announced that he had been diagnosed with non-Hodgkin lymphoma, Metzgar held a "Hogan Strong" vigil in Bel Air.

Metzgar served as an alternative delegate for the 2020 Republican National Convention. During the 2022 Maryland gubernatorial election, he endorsed state delegate Dan Cox, calling his opponent Kelly Schulz a "third term" of Governor Larry Hogan, whom he criticized for disapproving of Cox and former President Donald Trump.

== Political positions ==
=== Crime and policing ===
During his 2006 House of Delegates campaign, Metzgar said he would support strengthening Jessica's Law.

In May 2015, following the beating of Richard Fletcher, a 61-year-old Dundalk resident who intervened in a fight outside his home, Metzgar called for the closure of the Baltimore Community High School, where the perpetrators of the attack attended. The Baltimore City Board of Education voted to close the school in January 2016.

During the 2016 legislative session, Metzgar supported legislation that would require police to obtain a warrant to use a stingray phone tracker, which can locate a cellphone's user within six feet.

During the debate on the Juvenile Restoration Act, which abolished life without parole sentences for juveniles, in 2021, Metzgar supported an amendment that would make the bill not apply to people convicted of school shooting-related crimes. The amendment was rejected in a 51–83 vote.

=== Energy ===
During the 2019 legislative session, Metzgar voted against the Clean Energy Job Act, a bill that expanded the state's clean energy mandates. In 2023, he supported the POWER Act, which expanded the state's offshore wind energy goals. In March 2026, Metzgar was one of 10 Republicans to vote for the Utility RELIEF Act, a legislative package aimed at lowering electricity costs through a series of reforms to EmPOWER Maryland, delays to clean energy goals, and limits on what costs utility companies could pass onto consumers.

=== Health care ===
During the 2019 legislative session, Metzgar said he opposed the End-of-Life Option Act, which would have provided palliative care to terminally ill adults, citing his faith. He supported a bill to establish the Prescription Drug Affordability Board, a body tasked with making recommendations to the Maryland General Assembly on how to make prescription drugs more affordable.

=== Immigration ===
Metzgar supports reforms to federal immigration policy. In February 2026, he opposed a bill passed by the Baltimore County Council that prohibited private detention centers from operating in the county, saying that he believed the council's decision was rushed for judgement and done for publicity.

=== Social issues ===
During the 2020 legislative session, Metzgar supported legislation to allow sales of liquor in Baltimore County on Sundays.

In October 2023, Metzgar participated in a protest against the Baltimore County Board of Education and its policies toward transgender students participating in school sports and using bathrooms that correspond to their gender identity.

During the 2024 legislative session, Metzgar introduced a bill to ban abortions if a "fetal heartbeat" is detected. He reintroduced the bill during the 2025 legislative session.

=== Taxes ===
During his 2010 House of Delegates campaign, Metzgar said he supported repealing tax increases passed under the Martin O'Malley administration.

== Personal life ==
Metzgar is married and has two adult children.

== Electoral history ==
Maryland House of Delegates District 6 Republican primary election, 2006
| Party | Candidate | Votes | % |
|---|---|---|---|
| Republican | Steve Dishon | 1,701 | 32.1 |
| Republican | Ric Metzgar | 1,504 | 28.4 |
| Republican | Paul M. Blitz | 1,157 | 21.8 |
| Republican | Steven C. Brown | 934 | 17.6 |

Maryland House of Delegates District 6 election, 2006
| Party | Candidate | Votes | % |
|---|---|---|---|
| Democratic | Johnny Olszewski (incumbent) | 18,769 | 22.9 |
| Democratic | Joseph J. Minnick (incumbent) | 17,379 | 21.2 |
| Democratic | Michael H. Weir Jr. (incumbent) | 17,117 | 20.9 |
| Republican | Steve Dishon | 10,961 | 13.4 |
| Republican | Ric Metzgar | 8,915 | 10.9 |
| Republican | Paul M. Blitz | 8,765 | 10.7 |
| Write-in | | 106 | 0.1 |

Maryland House of Delegates District 6 Republican primary election, 2010
| Party | Candidate | Votes | % |
|---|---|---|---|
| Republican | Ric Metzgar | 2,775 | 36.3 |
| Republican | Robert B. Long | 2,584 | 33.8 |
| Republican | Carlton William Clendaniel | 2,291 | 29.9 |

Maryland House of Delegates District 6 election, 2010
| Party | Candidate | Votes | % |
|---|---|---|---|
| Democratic | John Olszewski Jr. (incumbent) | 16,278 | 20.2 |
| Democratic | Mike Weir, Jr. (incumbent) | 14,618 | 18.2 |
| Democratic | Joseph "Sonny" Minnick (incumbent) | 14,405 | 17.9 |
| Republican | Robert B. Long | 12,999 | 16.2 |
| Republican | Ric Metzgar | 12,480 | 15.5 |
| Republican | Carlton William Clendaniel | 9,612 | 11.9 |
| Write-in | | 79 | 0.1 |

Maryland House of Delegates District 6 Republican primary election, 2014
| Party | Candidate | Votes | % |
|---|---|---|---|
| Republican | Robert B. Long | 2,139 | 24.4 |
| Republican | Ric Metzgar | 1,707 | 19.5 |
| Republican | Robin Grammer Jr. | 1,224 | 14.0 |
| Republican | Roger Zajdel | 994 | 11.3 |
| Republican | Domenico "Dan" Liberatore | 860 | 9.8 |
| Republican | Mitchell J. Toland, Jr. | 701 | 8.0 |
| Republican | Carl H. Magee, Jr. | 577 | 6.6 |
| Republican | Gary Sparks | 450 | 5.1 |
| Republican | Jerzy Samotyj | 122 | 1.4 |

Maryland House of Delegates District 6 election, 2014
| Party | Candidate | Votes | % |
|---|---|---|---|
| Republican | Robert B. Long | 16,796 | 21.2 |
| Republican | Ric Metzgar | 15,176 | 19.1 |
| Republican | Robin L. Grammer Jr. | 14,582 | 18.4 |
| Democratic | Nicholas C. D'Adamo, Jr. | 11,599 | 14.6 |
| Democratic | Michael H. Weir Jr. (incumbent) | 11,503 | 14.5 |
| Democratic | Jake Mohorovic | 9,526 | 12.0 |
| Write-in | | 97 | 0.1 |

Maryland House of Delegates District 6 election, 2018
| Party | Candidate | Votes | % |
|---|---|---|---|
| Republican | Robert B. Long (incumbent) | 18,291 | 19.7 |
| Republican | Robin L. Grammer Jr. (incumbent) | 18,084 | 19.5 |
| Republican | Ric Metzgar (incumbent) | 17,803 | 19.2 |
| Democratic | Nicholas C. D'Adamo, Jr. | 12,847 | 13.9 |
| Democratic | Megan Ann Mioduszewski | 12,213 | 13.2 |
| Democratic | Diane DeCarlo | 12,000 | 12.9 |
| Libertarian | Michael J. Lyden | 1,459 | 1.6 |
| Write-in | | 59 | 0.1 |

Maryland House of Delegates District 6 election, 2022
| Party | Candidate | Votes | % |
|---|---|---|---|
| Republican | Ric Metzgar (incumbent) | 16,696 | 23.6 |
| Republican | Robin L. Grammer Jr. (incumbent) | 16,344 | 23.1 |
| Republican | Robert B. Long (incumbent) | 15,987 | 22.6 |
| Democratic | Megan Ann Mioduszewski | 11,300 | 16.0 |
| Democratic | Jake Mohorovic III | 10,109 | 14.3 |
| Write-in | | 304 | 0.4 |
