= Robin Grammer Jr. =

American politician (born 1980)

Robin Grammer
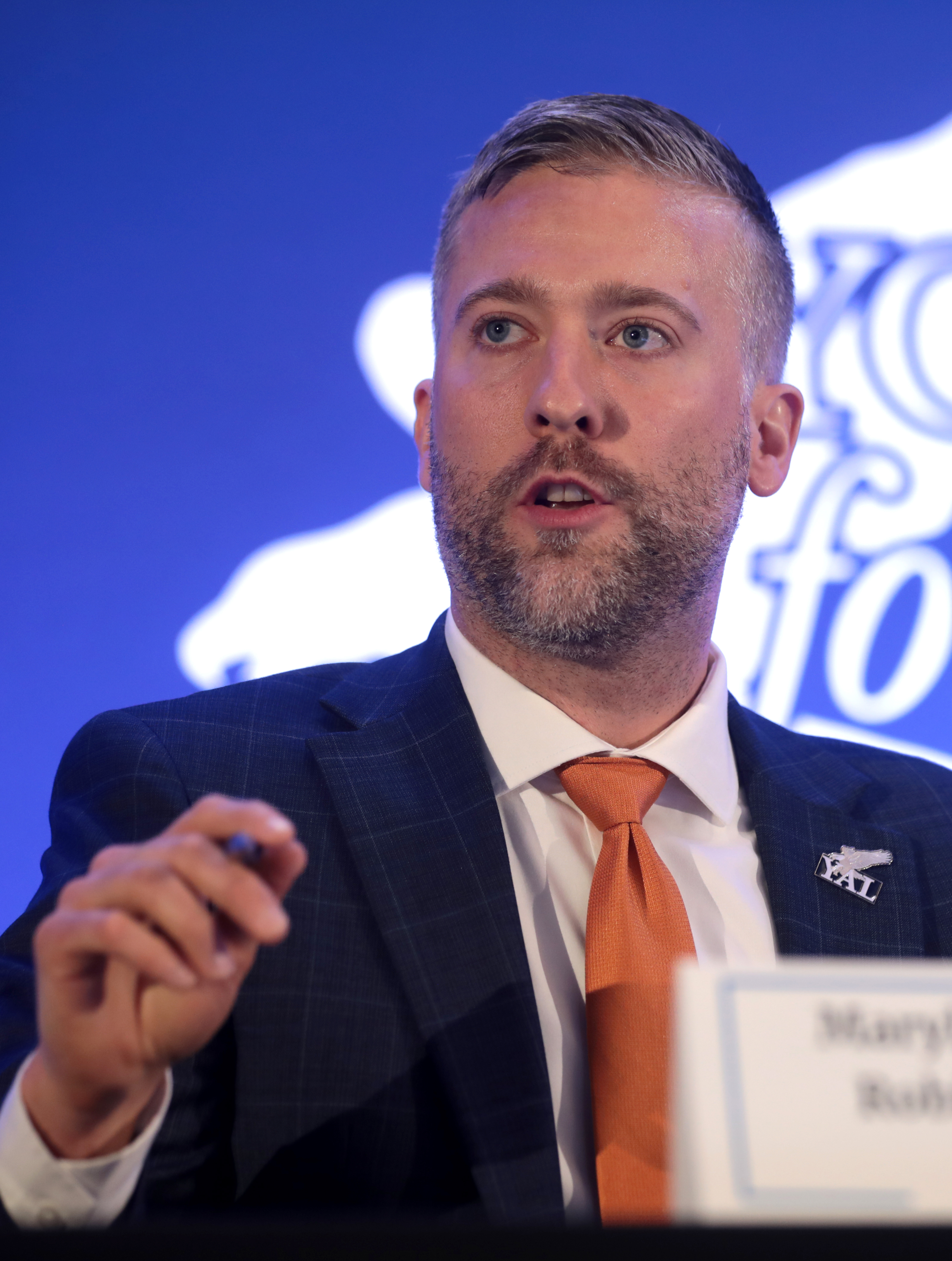
- Grammer at the 2022 Hazlitt Summit hosted by Young Americans for Liberty Foundation

Member of the Maryland House of Delegates from the 6th district
- Incumbent
- Assumed office January 14, 2015 Serving with Richard W. Metzgar, Robert B. Long
- Preceded by: Johnny Olszewski

Personal details
- Born: June 19, 1980 (age 46) Essex, Maryland, U.S.
- Party: Republican
- Spouse: Kathy Pietruszka (m. 2015, separated)
- Grammer's voice Grammer speaks against violence in Baltimore County Public Schools. Recorded May 21, 2019

Robin L. Grammer Jr. (born June 19, 1980) is an American politician who is currently a member of the Maryland House of Delegates representing District 6 in southeast Baltimore County. He is a lifelong resident of Maryland and a member of the Republican Party.

== Early and personal life ==
Grammer was born in Essex, Maryland on June 19, 1980, to father Robin Grammer Sr. and mother Pamela. He graduated from the Eastern Technical High School, and later attended the Community College of Baltimore County, earning an A.A. degree in computer science.

Grammer married Kathy Pietruszka on May 23, 2015. In February 2026, Maryland Matters reported that Grammer was in a relationship with state delegate Lauren Arikan. Grammer lives in Essex.

== In the legislature ==
Grammer was sworn into the Maryland House of Delegates on January 14, 2015. He served as a member of the Appropriations Committee from 2015 to 2018, afterwards serving as a member of the Judiciary Committee since 2019.

Grammer is a founding member of the Maryland Freedom Caucus. During an interview with The Baltimore Sun in February 2026, Grammer described the relationship between the Freedom Caucus and the broader Republican Caucus as contentious, criticizing House minority leader Jason C. Buckel for making the Republican caucus ineffective during his leadership, as well as accusing him of discouraging members from speaking out against Democratic legislation during floor debates and sharing internal strategy discussions with Democrats. Buckel strongly rejected these claims, saying that the strategy of the Republican caucus was to "attempt to mitigate the worst aspects of far-left legislation that Annapolis Democrats frequently advance" through every avenue available under the General Assembly rules, and that the Republican caucus will engage with Democratic leaders to raise concerns with certain legislation and "see if there are opportunities to have meaningful input, something that many Freedom Caucus members seem to be incapable of".

In June 2019, Grammer came under fire from other Baltimore County elected officials over social media comments towards members of the Baltimore County Public Schools Board of Education that contained racially-charged language. He later reiterated his comments, saying that he meant to say that he does not "believe in cutting deals with criminals so that they can walk away without consequence to terrorize another school system" and that his comment had no reference to lynching. The Baltimore County NAACP condemned Grammer's comments as "racist and inflammatory", and asked state legislative officials to investigate his posts.

In June 2024, Grammer and three other Republican lawmakers signed onto a letter to the superintendent of Baltimore County Public Schools calling for the termination of Alexa Sciuto, a LGBTQIA+ advocate who taught at Baltimore County Schools. In the letter, the legislators alleged that Sciuto made death threats toward Kit Hart, the chair of the Carroll County Moms for Liberty chapter, citing a tweet from Sciuto that read, "Officer, I swear I didn't mean to murder her" above a picture of Hart. Sciuto had made the post after Hart failed to clearly define the word "woke" during a parents' rights panel in Towson. In June 2025, Sciuto filed a defamation lawsuit against the lawmakers, multiple Moms for Liberty members, and Libs of TikTok, claiming that her tweet was rhetorical and that the lawmakers had mischaracterized it as a death threat. Sciuto's lawsuit against the lawmakers was dismissed in April 2026.

In June 2026, Grammer and several other Republicans who ran for congressional, state, or county offices that year filed a lawsuit against the Maryland State Board of Elections, seeking a temporary restraining order that would prohibit the state from certifying the primary election results unless the state established guidelines to canvass mail-in ballots following an error that resulted in 437,000 replacement ballots being sent out to voters. Anne Arundel County circuit court judge Robert J. Thompson denied the petition for a restraining order, saying that the complaint would not "have a great likelihood of success on the merits in this matter".

== Political positions ==
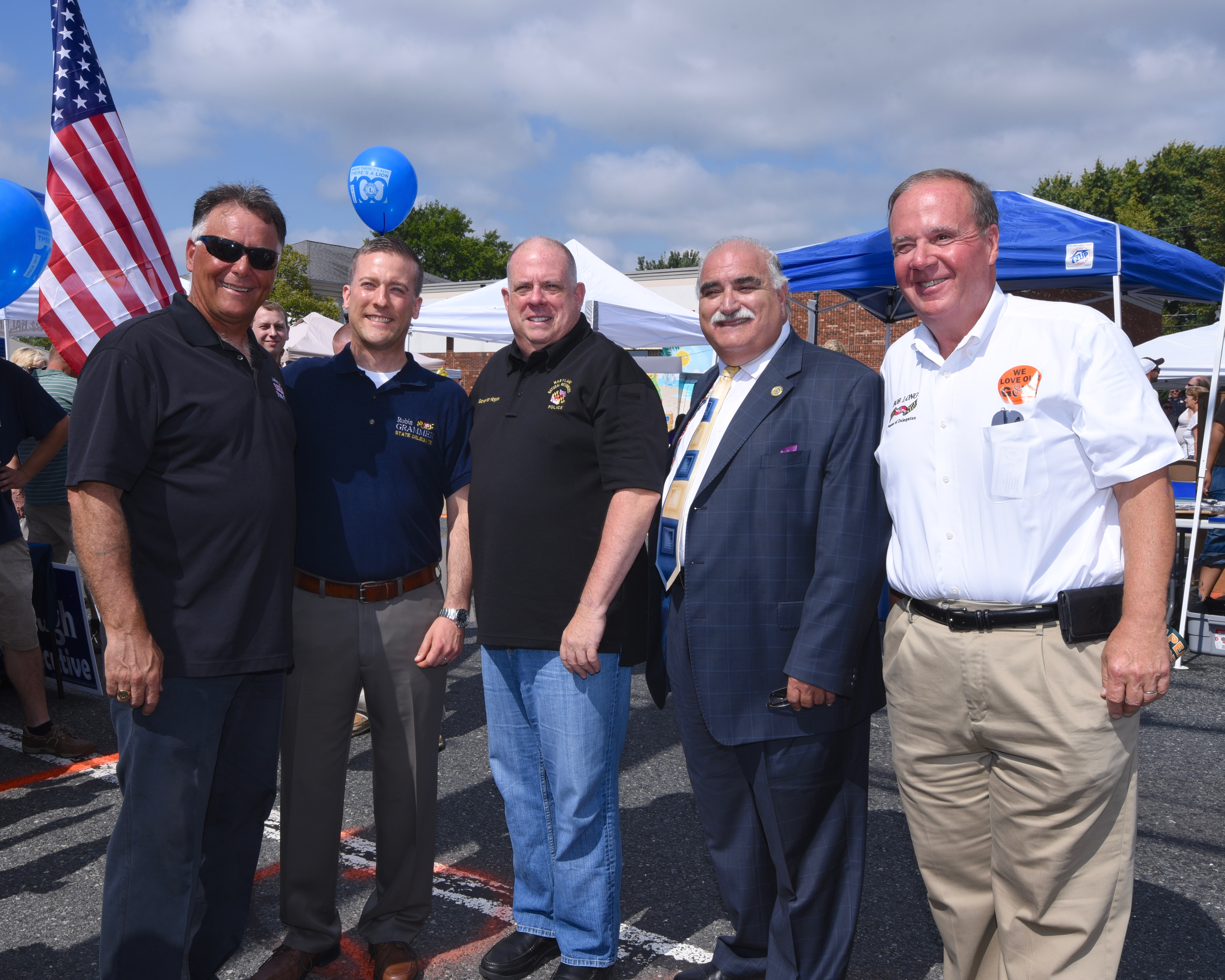
Grammer (center left) and other District 6 legislators with Governor Larry Hogan, 2017

=== Crime and policing ===
In May 2015, following the beating of a Richard Fletcher, a 61-year-old Dundalk resident who intervened in a fight outside his home, Grammer called for the closure of the Baltimore Community High School, where the perpetrators of the attack attended. The Baltimore City Board of Education voted to close the school in January 2016.

During the 2016 legislative session, Grammer supported legislation that would require police to obtain a warrant to use a stingray phone tracker, which can locate a cellphone's user within six feet.

In 2019, Grammer said he opposed Anton's Law, a bill that would have reformed the Maryland Public Information Act to require transparency in investigations of complaints against law enforcement officers, expressing concerns that it would discourage whistleblowers from coming forward. During the 2021 legislative session, he introduced legislation that would have banned no-knock warrants. Grammer also opposed the Police Reform and Accountability Act of 2021, saying that it would put police across the state in an "impossible position."

During the 2023 legislative session, Grammer introduced legislation that would require a warrant in the use of "persistent aerial surveillance" to record video or take pictures, and another bill to strengthen the state's ban on ticket quotas. In February 2023, during a committee hearing on the quota ban bill, Grammer released leaked documents showing Maryland State Police supervisors discussing a points-based quota system, despite the state's longtime ban on ticket and arrest quotas. Acting Maryland State Police Superintendent Roland Butler acknowledged the documents in March 2023, and said that agency leadership was unaware of the use of the quota system, which he said was "inappropriate and blatantly wrong".

During the 2026 legislative session, Grammer introduced a bill to ban no-knock warrants, arrest quotas, and the use of unmanned aerial vehicles in law enforcement. He sought to add the bill to another bill to prohibit counties from entering into 287(g) program agreements, which was rejected in a 12–118 vote. In April 2026, Grammer opposed a bill that would end the practice of automatically charging minors as adults for certain crimes.

=== Housing and development ===
During the 2016 legislative session, Grammer supported legislation that would require Baltimore County to give residents advance notice when moving public housing residents from Baltimore into suburban houses in the county.

In February 2019, after the Maryland Transportation Authority and the Federal Highway Administration released a set of potential routes a second Bay Bridge could take, Grammer expressed concern with two routes that would connect the Delmarva Peninsula to rural areas near Dundalk, which he said would "more than likely destroy the nature of the communities".

=== Education ===
During the 2015 legislative session, Grammer introduced legislation to prohibit the Maryland State Department of Education from regulating the sale of coffee in relation to career exploration and development activities. The bill was reintroduced in 2016, during which it passed unanimously and became law.

Also in 2016, Grammer introduced legislation that would require a state audit of contracts awarded during the tenure of Baltimore County Public Schools officer Dallas Dance, who entered into a guilty plea after using his position to steer contracts toward a company that he worked for on the side, which failed to pass. He also introduced a bill requiring the Baltimore County Board of Education to post results of its roll call votes online, which passed and became law.

During the 2023 legislative session, Grammer introduced a bill that would shield school employees from civil liability in a personal injury or property damage dispute involving a student. The bill failed to pass out of the Maryland Senate.

In April 2023, Grammer sent a letter to State Superintendent Mohammed Choudhury accusing the Maryland State Department of Education of hiding scores from failing scores by altering data files available on the department's website. An investigation conducted by the state inspector general found no evidence of these claims.

=== Environment ===
During the 2020 legislative session, Grammer proposed amendments to legislation that would remove black liquor from the state's top renewable energy tier under the renewable energy portfolio standard that would delay the bill's effective date to 2023 and made black liquor a Tier 1 renewable energy source; both amendments were rejected by votes of 40-91 and 41-90.

Grammer introduced legislation during the 2022 legislative session that would prevent the Maryland Department of Natural Resources from dredging in the Man O'War Shoals, a prehistoric oyster reef containing as much as 100 million bushels of buried bivalve shell.

In March 2022, Grammer sent a letter to Governor Larry Hogan calling for the resignation of Maryland Secretary of the Environment Ben Grumbles, citing issues with the Back River Wastewater Treatment Plant.

=== Gun policy ===
In November 2019, Grammer said he opposed preventing medical marijuana patients from owning guns, which he said would limit their job opportunities and sporting activities.

In 2022, Grammer said he opposed a bill that would require gun shops to have increased safety measures, including 24-hour burglary alarm systems and anti-vehicle barriers, which he said would penalize small business owners.

During the 2023 legislative session, Grammer said he opposed legislation that would strengthen state regulations on concealed carry permits following the U.S. Supreme Court's decision in New York State Rifle & Pistol Association, Inc. v. Bruen, which made public possession of guns a protected right under the Second Amendment. He also introduced amendments to the Gun Safety Act of 2023 that would create concealed carry exemptions for railroad police and armored car company employees, which were adopted unanimously.

=== Healthcare ===
During the 2023 legislative session, Grammer introduced legislation that would required Maryland's pension system adopt a low-cost strategy. The bill died in committee. In 2024, he introduced a bill that would allow state employees that retired before 2011 to continue receiving pension benefits provided by the State Employee and Retiree Health and Welfare Benefits Program instead of shifting to Medicare Part D.

During the 2026 legislative session, Grammer opposed a bill that would require private health insurers to provide coverage for scalp cooling for cancer patients, which he said would raise health insurance costs and that the scalp cooling method only fixes a cosmetic issue.

=== Immigration ===
During the 2017 legislative session, Grammer opposed a bill that would have made Maryland a sanctuary state. The legislature initially passed the bill in both chambers, but failed to override the governor's veto. In April 2017, he opposed an executive order signed by Baltimore County executive Kevin Kamenetz that formalized police policy on undocumented immigrants in Baltimore County.

In November 2025, Grammer opposed a bill to ban 287(g) program agreements in Maryland, saying that restricting the program could put communities at risk. During debate on the bill during the 2026 legislative session, he unsuccessfully sought to add two amendments to the bill, including one that would require local authorities to inform U.S. Immigration and Customs Enforcement (ICE) at least 48 hours before a person detained is released. In February 2026, he criticized Republican members of the Baltimore County Council for voting for a bill to prohibit private detention centers from operating in the county, saying that the councilmembers had "voted with Governor Wes Moore tin continuing this open borders immigration policy". He also defended the proposed detention centers, saying that they would facilitate a peaceful transfer of immigrants lacking permanent legal status.

=== Marijuana ===
Grammer is a member of the House Cannabis Referendum and Legalization Work Group and the Marijuana Legalization Work Group. In 2015, he voted alongside six other Republicans for a bill that would decriminalize the possession of marijuana paraphernalia. During the 2020 legislative session, Grammer supported the "Connor's Courage Act", which would allow medical marijuana to be administered at schools.

=== National politics ===
In April 2023, following the indictment of former President Donald Trump for his alleged role in the Stormy Daniels–Donald Trump scandal, Grammer questioned whether hush money payments made to Stormy Daniels merited a criminal prosecution. He signed onto a letter condemning the jury's guilty verdict in the trial in May 2024, calling the ruling a "political prosecution from a kangaroo court and left-leaning prosecutor" that is turning the U.S. justice system into a "third world parody of law and order".

=== Social issues ===
During the 2019 legislative session, Grammer introduced legislation that would require judges and magistrates to be named in Maryland Judiciary Case Search results. The bill died in committee.

In 2021, Grammer was one of nine state delegates to vote against a bill establishing the framework for the state's sports betting industry following the passage of 2020 Maryland Question 2, calling the bill's licensing provisions "too limited".

In 2022, Grammer said he opposed a bill that would ban threats against public health officials and hospital workers, saying that he felt that there was a "low bar" for what constituted a "threat" under the bill.

During the 2024 legislative session, Grammer introduced a bill that would require Maryland to submit abortion-related data to the Centers for Disease Control and Prevention (CDC). As of 2024, Maryland is one of four states that do not submit such data to the CDC. He reintroduced the bill again during the 2025 legislative session.

In December 2025, Grammer opposed overriding Governor Wes Moore's veto of a bill to study reparations to victims of slavery or their descendants in Maryland, calling the commission a distraction from "the real problems" affecting Maryland residents, such as traffic problems and taxes for retirees and seniors.

During the 2026 legislative session, Grammer opposed a bill that would allow unaffiliated voters to change their party affiliation at the polls to vote in partisan primary elections, expressing concerns that the bill would lead to special interests targeting unaffiliated voters to support a certain candidate, potentially harming campaigns with fewer financial resources. He also opposed a bill that prohibits counties and municipalities from implementing voting systems that diminishes the ability of minority groups to elect candidates of its choice, claiming that it would allow any protected class "unhappy with an election's outcome [to] sue their county into oblivion, claiming their vote was diluted".

== Electoral history ==
Maryland House of Delegates District 6 Republican primary election, 2014
Party	Candidate	Votes	%
Republican	Robert B. Long	2,139	24.4
Republican	Ric Metzgar	1,707	19.5
Republican	Robin L. Grammer Jr.	1,224	14.0
Republican	Roger Zajdel	994	11.3
Republican	Domenico "Dan" Liberatore	860	9.8
Republican	Mitchell J. Toland, Jr.	701	8.0
Republican	Carl H. Magee, Jr.	577	6.6
Republican	Gary Sparks	450	5.1
Republican	Jerzy Samotyj	122	1.4

Maryland House of Delegates District 6 election, 2014
Party	Candidate	Votes	%
Republican	Robert B. Long	16,796	21.2
Republican	Ric Metzgar	15,176	19.1
Republican	Robin L. Grammer Jr.	14,582	18.4
Democratic	Nicholas C. D'Adamo, Jr.	11,599	14.6
Democratic	Michael H. Weir Jr. (incumbent)	11,503	14.5
Democratic	Jake Mohorovic	9,526	12.0
Write-in		97	0.1

Maryland House of Delegates District 6 election, 2018
Party	Candidate	Votes	%
Republican	Robert B. Long (incumbent)	18,291	19.7
Republican	Robin L. Grammer Jr. (incumbent)	18,084	19.5
Republican	Ric Metzgar (incumbent)	17,803	19.2
Democratic	Nicholas C. D'Adamo, Jr.	12,847	13.9
Democratic	Megan Ann Mioduszewski	12,213	13.2
Democratic	Diane DeCarlo	12,000	12.9
Libertarian	Michael J. Lyden	1,459	1.6
Write-in		59	0.1

Maryland House of Delegates District 6 election, 2022
Party	Candidate	Votes	%
Republican	Ric Metzgar (incumbent)	16,696	23.6
Republican	Robin L. Grammer Jr. (incumbent)	16,344	23.1
Republican	Robert B. Long (incumbent)	15,987	22.6
Democratic	Megan Ann Mioduszewski	11,300	16.0
Democratic	Jake Mohorovic III	10,109	14.3
Write-in		304	0.4
