= John W. Seling =

American politician (died 1986)

Member of the Maryland House of Delegates from the 9th district
- In office 1977–1978 Serving with George E. Heffner and William Rush
- Preceded by: Louis Einschutz

Personal details
- Born: Rosedale, Maryland, U.S.
- Died: February 20, 1986 (aged 76) Satellite Beach, Florida
- Resting place: Gardens of Faith Cemetery; Rosedale, Maryland, U.S.
- Party: Democratic
- Spouse: Amelia Solba (m. 1934)
- Children: 4
- Occupation: Fireman; politician

John W. Seling (died February 20, 1986) was an American politician and fireman from Maryland. He served as a member of the Maryland House of Delegates, representing District 9 from 1977 to 1978.

== Early life ==
John W. Seling was born in Rosedale, Maryland.

== Career ==
In 1940, Seling joined the Baltimore County Fire Department. He reached the rank of captain and retired in 1965.

Seling was a Democrat. In 1974, Seling was elected to the Baltimore County State Central Committee. In 1977, he was appointed to the Maryland House of Delegates, representing District 9, to replace Louis Einschutz. He served until 1978, deciding not to run again.

Seling served as a member of the board of directors of the Fairmount Savings and Loan Association.

== Personal life ==
Seling married Amelia Solba in 1934. They had two sons and two daughters, John W. Jr., George F., Barbara E. and Anna T. He was a member of St. Clement's Catholic Church.

Seling died on February 20, 1986, at the age of 76, at his winter home in Satellite Beach, Florida. He was buried at Gardens of Faith Cemetery in Rosedale.
