= Johnny Ray Salling =

American politician (born 1961)

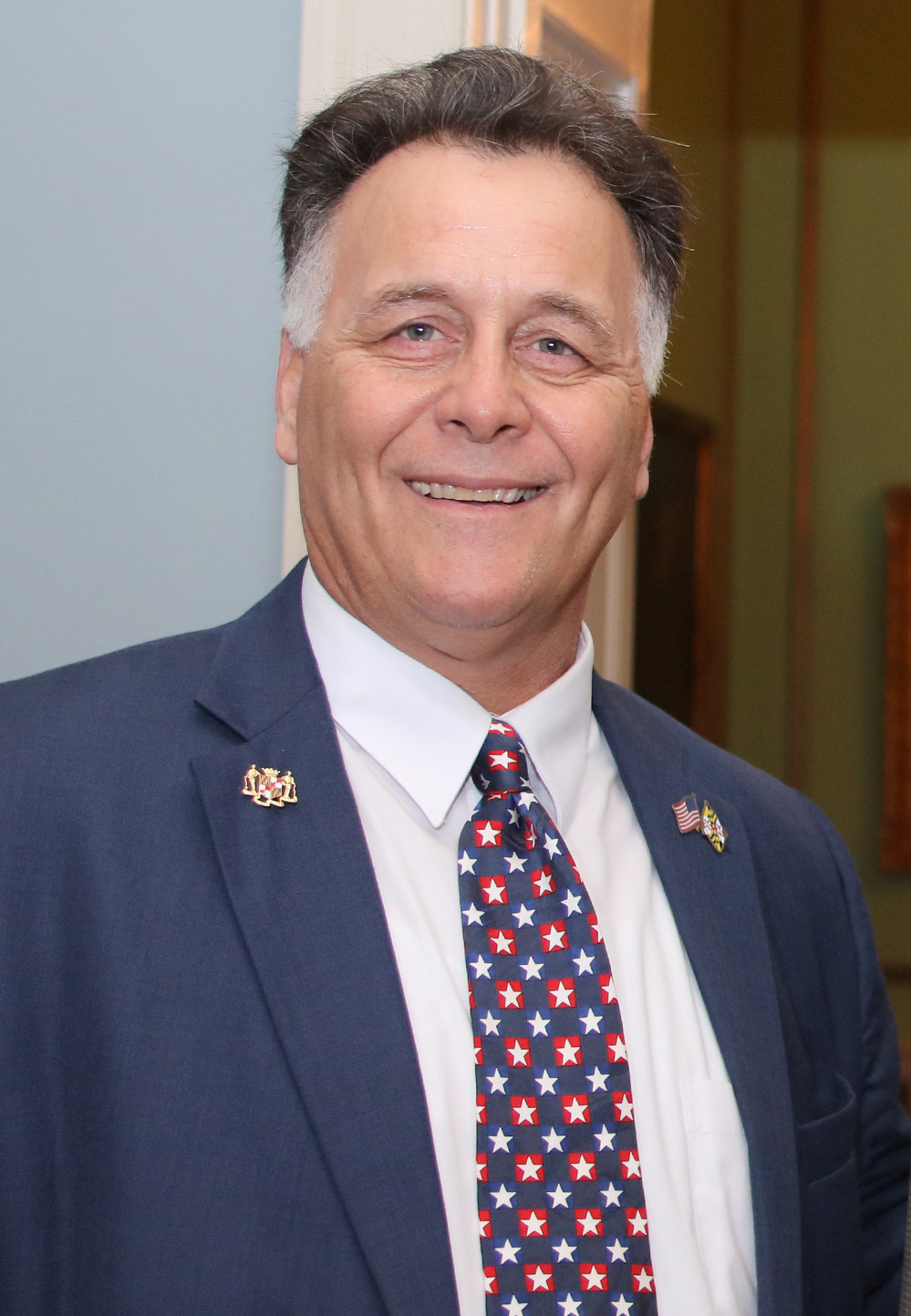
- Salling in 2017

Member of the Maryland Senate from the 6th district
- Incumbent
- Assumed office January 14, 2015
- Preceded by: Norman R. Stone Jr.

Personal details
- Born: Johnny Ray Salling; October 31, 1961 (age 65) Baltimore, Maryland, U.S.
- Party: Republican
- Children: 5
- Education: Sparrows Point High School

Military service
- Allegiance: United States
- Branch/service: United States Army
- Years of service: 1979–1981
- Johnny Ray Salling's voice Johnny Ray Salling on a southeast Baltimore County school construction study Recorded April 21, 2022

Johnny Ray Salling (born October 31, 1961) is an American politician who has served as a member of the Maryland Senate representing the 6th district since 2015. A member of the Republican Party, the district covers southeast Baltimore County, including Dundalk, Essex and Rosedale.

== Early life and career ==
Salling was born in Baltimore, Maryland on October 31, 1961, where he graduated from Sparrows Point High School. In 1979, he joined the United States Army, serving as a combat engineer until 1981. Upon his return to the United States, he worked as a steel worker for LaFarge of North America at the Bethlehem Steel Mill in Sparrows Point, Maryland for more than 30 years, where he gained experience as a union representative for the United Steelworkers of America union.

In September 2013, Salling filed to run for the Maryland Senate, seeking to succeed Democratic state senator Norman Stone, who had announced his retirement from the General Assembly. He says that the closing of the Sparrows Point mill in 2012 moved him to run for public office. Stone endorsed his challenger, state delegate Johnny Olszewski, during the general election. Salling defeated Olszewski in the general election, garnering 47.9 percent of the vote compared to Olszewski's 44.7 percent.

== In the legislature ==
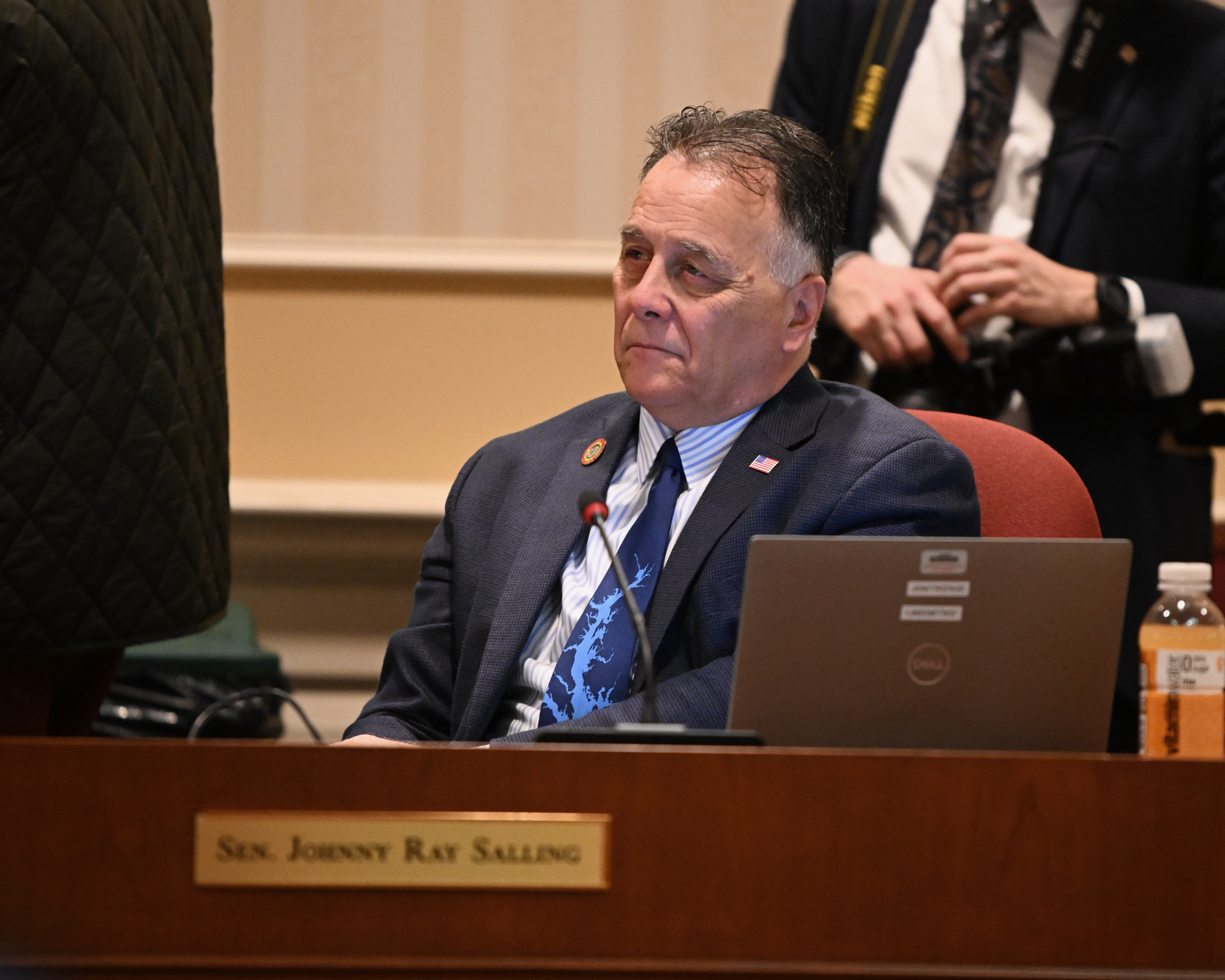
Salling in the Budget and Taxation Committee, 2023

Salling was sworn into the Maryland Senate on January 14, 2015. He was a member of the Education, Health, and Environmental Affairs Committee from 2015 to 2019, afterwards serving as a member of the Budget and Taxation Committee until 2027. He was assigned to the Senate Judicial Proceedings Committee at the start of the 2027 legislative session. In April 2017, Salling joined the Reform on Tap task force, which was led by Comptroller Peter Franchot and sought to reform the state's regulations on the production and distribution of beer in the state.

In July 2019, Salling responded to a tweet about a request for an ethics investigation into U.S. Representative Ilhan Omar with "Get rid of this illegal know!!!!! [sic]" The Council on American–Islamic Relations called on Salling to apologize for the tweet or to resign. He deleted the tweet after speaking to The Baltimore Sun, denying having made the tweet and suggesting that he may have been hacked.

== 2020 House of Representatives election campaign ==
In August 2019, Salling announced his candidacy for Maryland's 2nd congressional district in the 2020 elections, seeking to take on incumbent Democrat Dutch Ruppersberger. He did not have to give up his state senate seat to run for Congress, as he was not up for reelection until 2022. Salling narrowly won the Republican nomination, earning 19.1 percent of the vote in the primary election. He was defeated by Ruppersberger in the general election, receiving 32 percent of the vote.

== Political positions ==
Maryland Matters has described Salling as a social conservative, but notes that he occasionally votes with Democrats on bills involving workers' rights and opportunities. A self-described lifelong Republican, he has described Donald Trump has his political idol and supported the businessman's 2016 and 2024 presidential campaigns.

=== Environment ===
In 2018, the Maryland League of Conservation Voters gave Salling a score of 17 percent on its annual legislative scorecard – the lowest score in the Maryland Senate.

During a debate on a sweeping climate action bill in March 2021, Salling introduced an amendment that would lower the bill's pollution reduction goal from 60 percent to 50 percent, contending that it was too ambitious. The amendment was rejected by a vote of 15-31.

=== Immigration ===
In April 2017, Salling denounced an executive order issued by Baltimore County executive Kevin Kamenetz that formalized police policy on undocumented immigrants in the county, calling it "dangerous". In November 2025, Salling opposed a bill to ban 287(g) program agreements in Maryland, saying that restrictions on the program could put communities at risk.

=== Marijuana ===
Salling says that he does not agree with the legalization of recreational marijuana, but he does accept that cannabis does have some medicinal benefits.

=== Redistricting ===
In February 2026, Salling said he opposed pursuing mid-decade redistricting in Maryland and opposed holding a vote on a bill that would redraw Maryland's congressional districts to improve the Democratic Party's chances of winning the 1st congressional district, the only congressional district held by Republicans in the state, calling the proposed map "gerrymandered".

=== Policing ===
Salling supports providing police departments with additional funding and training and disagrees with calls to defund police departments and invest in community social services.

=== Transportation ===
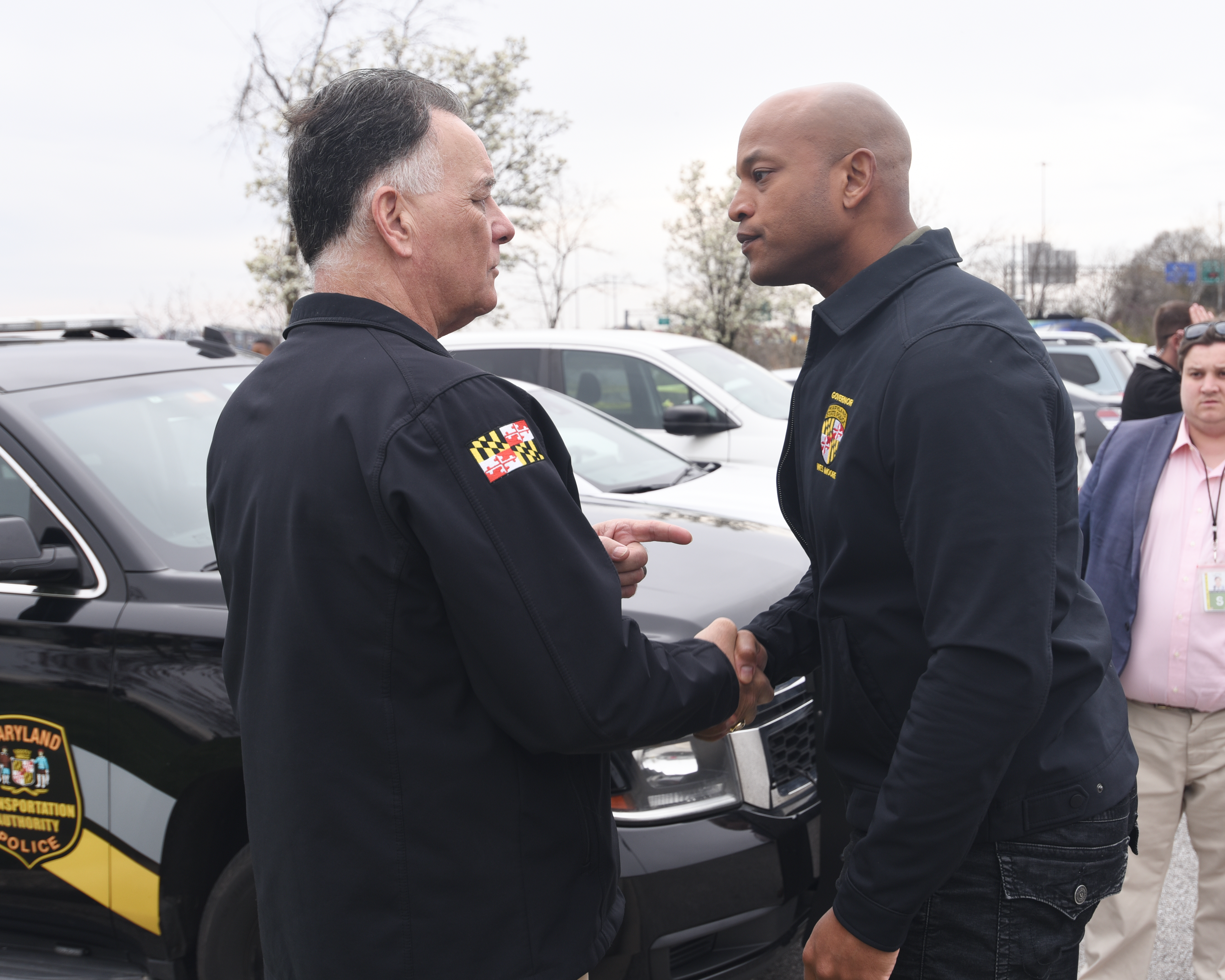
Salling shakes hands with Governor Wes Moore during a press conference on the Francis Scott Key Bridge collapse, 2024

In March 2024, following the Francis Scott Key Bridge collapse, Salling and state senator Bryan Simonaire introduced a bill that would allow the governor to declare a year-long state of emergency after damage to critical infrastructure, though it would eliminate the authority to seize private property for government use, as now allowed under a state of emergency. The bill was withdrawn by Simonaire following discussions with the Moore administration.

== Personal life ==
Salling is a devout Christian.

== Electoral history ==
Maryland Senate District 6 Republican primary election, 2014
Party	Candidate	Votes	%
Republican	Johnny Ray Salling	2,669	100.0

Maryland Senate District 6 election, 2014
Party	Candidate	Votes	%
Republican	Johnny Ray Salling	14,916	47.7
Democratic	Johnny Olszewski	14,065	44.9
Independent	Scott M. Collier	2,285	7.3
Write-in		26	0.1

Maryland Senate District 6 election, 2018
Party	Candidate	Votes	%
Republican	Johnny Ray Salling (incumbent)	19,511	55.3
Democratic	Buddy Staigerwald	14,108	40.0
Independent	Scott M. Collier	1,631	4.6
Write-in		23	0.1

Maryland's 2nd congressional district Republican primary election, 2020
Party	Candidate	Votes	%
Republican	Johnny Ray Salling	5,942	19.1
Republican	Genevieve Morris	5,134	16.5
Republican	Tim Fazenbaker	5,123	16.4
Republican	Rick Impallaria	5,061	16.2
Republican	Jim Simpson	4,764	15.3
Republican	Scott M. Collier	3,564	11.4
Republican	Blaine Taylor	1,562	5.0

Maryland's 2nd congressional district election, 2020
Party	Candidate	Votes	%
Democratic	Dutch Ruppersberger (incumbent)	224,836	67.7
Republican	Johnny Ray Salling	106,355	32.0
Write-in		835	0.3

Maryland Senate District 6 election, 2022
Party	Candidate	Votes	%
Republican	Johnny Ray Salling (incumbent)	18,278	61.2
Democratic	Cory D. Edwards	11,563	38.7
Write-in		44	0.2
