= Norman R. Stone Jr. =

American politician (1935–2023)

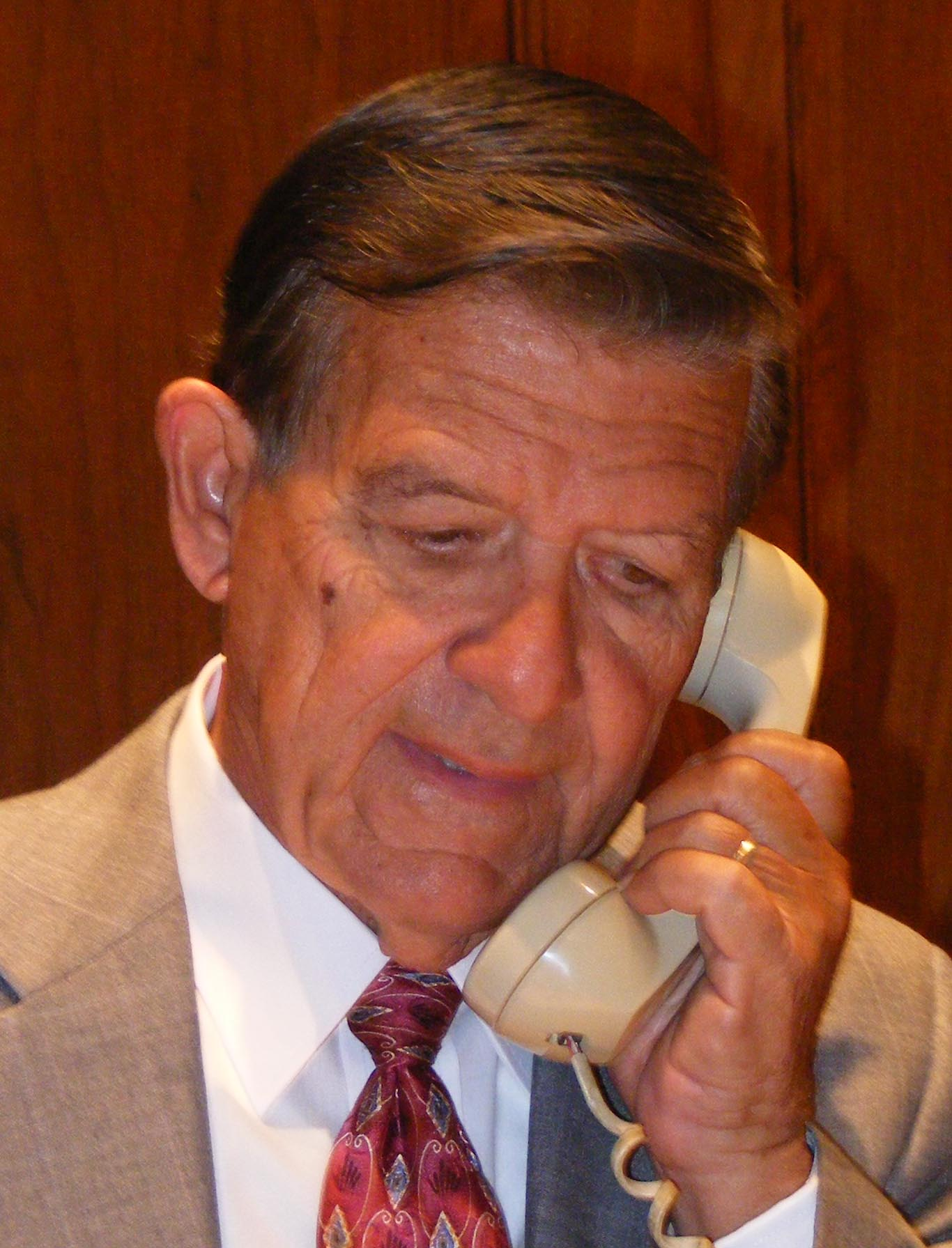
- Stone in 2007

Member of the Maryland Senate
- In office January 11, 1967 – January 14, 2015
- Succeeded by: Johnny Ray Salling
- Constituency: 6th district (1967–1983); 7th district (1983–2003); 6th district (2003–2015)

Member of the Maryland House of Delegates from Baltimore County
- In office January 9, 1963 – January 11, 1967
- Preceded by: Charles F. Culver
- Succeeded by: Constituency abolished

Personal details
- Born: September 8, 1935 Baltimore, Maryland, U.S.
- Died: June 16, 2023 (aged 87) Annapolis, Maryland, U.S.
- Party: Democratic
- Spouse: JoAnne R. Stone
- Children: 4
- Occupation: Attorney

Norman R. Stone Jr. (September 8, 1935 – June 16, 2023) was an American politician and the longest-serving Senator in the Maryland State Senate. He held the distinction of being the only Maryland State Senator to have voted against both repealing the ban on interracial marriage, and permitting same-sex marriage. Stone served in the Maryland House of Delegates from 1963 to 1967. He was first elected to the State Senate in 1966. Stone was a member of the Maryland General Assembly for more than 50 years. Stone was a graduate of the Baltimore City College High School and the University of Baltimore Law School.

== Career ==
=== Legislative notes ===
- February 9, 1967 – voted against repeal of the law banning interracial marriage in Maryland.
- February 23, 2012 – voted against the "Civil Marriage Protection Act", which would allow same-sex couples to obtain a marriage license in Maryland. (See 2012 Maryland Question 6)

=== Task Force, Boards and Commissions ===
In June 2012, Stone was appointed by Maryland legislative leaders to a task force to study the impact of a Maryland Court of Appeals ruling regarding the liability of owners of pit bulls and landlords that rent to them.

== Death ==
Stone died at the Anne Arundel Medical Center in Annapolis, Maryland on June 16, 2023. He was 87.
