= Joseph J. Minnick =

American politician

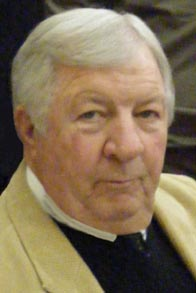

Member of the Maryland House of Delegates from the 6th district
- In office January 11, 1995 – January 14, 2015
- Succeeded by: Robert B. Long
- Constituency: Baltimore County

Member of the Maryland House of Delegates
- In office 1988–1990

Personal details
- Born: March 16, 1933 Dundalk, Maryland
- Died: October 12, 2015 (aged 82) Timonium, Maryland
- Party: Democratic
- Spouse: Barbara Minnick
- Occupation: Restaurant Owner

Joseph J. "Sonny" Minnick (March 16, 1933 – October 12, 2015) was an American politician from Maryland and a member of the Democratic Party.

== Background ==
Minnick was born in Dundalk, Maryland on March 16, 1933. He served in the United States Navy during the Korean War. Upon arriving home, he joined his brother Dan Minnick Jr. to take over the management of Minnick's Hollywood Inn, a family business founded by his grandfather in the early 1920s, now known as Minnick's Restaurant and Catering Business, Inc. Minnick's bar was raided on June 29, 2011, which seized five video devices believed to be involved in illegal gambling . Minnick was not charged.

Minnick was active with both the Restaurant Association and with veteran's groups. Minnick was a strong supporter of small businesses in the State of Maryland. He died on October 12, 2015, from a blood disease.

== In the Legislature ==
He served five terms in the Maryland House of Delegates, representing Maryland's District 6 in Baltimore County. Minnick was a member of the Economic Matters Committee.

=== Legislative notes ===
- voted against the Clean Indoor Air Act of 2007 (HB359)
- voted against in-state tuition for illegal immigrants in 2007 -Higher Education -Tuition Charges -Maryland High School Students, 2007 (HB6)
- voted for income tax reduction in 1998 (SB750)
- voted for the Maryland Gang Prosecution Act of 2007 (HB713), subjecting gang members to up to 20 years in prison and/or a fine of up to $100,000
- voted for Jessica's Law (HB 930), eliminating parole for the most violent child sexual predators and creating a mandatory minimum sentence of 25 years in state prison, 2007
- voted for Public Safety – Statewide DNA Database System – Crimes of Violence and Burglary – Post conviction (HB 370), helping to give police officers and prosecutors greater resources to solve crimes and eliminating a backlog of 24,000 unanalyzed DNA samples, leading to 192 arrests, 2008
- voted for Vehicle Laws – Repeated Drunk and Drugged Driving Offenses – Suspension of License (HB 293), strengthening Maryland's drunk driving laws by imposing a mandatory one year license suspension for a person convicted of drunk driving more than once in five years, 2009
- voted for HB 102, creating the House Emergency Medical Services System Workgroup, leading to Maryland's budgeting of $52 million to fund three new Medevac helicopters to replace the State's aging fleet, 2009
- voted against Civil Marriage Protection Act (HB438) - civil marriage rights for same-sex couples, 2012

For the past four years, Delegate Minnick has annually voted to support classroom teachers, public schools, police and hospitals in Baltimore County. Since 2002, funding to schools across the State has increased 82%, resulting in Maryland being ranked top in the nation for K-12 education.

== Election results ==
- 2002 Race for Maryland House of Delegates – District 6

Voters to choose three:

Name	Votes	Percent	Outcome
John S. Arnick Dem.	17,541	20.87%	Won
Joseph J. Minnick, Dem.	17,530	20.85%	Won
Michael H. Weir, Jr., Dem.	17,958	21.36%	Won
Jane Brooks, Rep.	12,517	14.89%	Lost
Bruce Laing, Rep.	9,448	11.24%	Lost
Paul Michael Blitz, Rep.	8,969	10.67%	Lost
Other Write-Ins	106	0.13%	Lost

- 1998 Race for Maryland House of Delegates – District 7

Voters to choose three:

Name	Votes	Percent	Outcome
Jacob J. Mohorovic Jr., Dem.	16,338	23%	Won
Joseph J. Minnick, Dem.	15,095	21%	Won
John S. Arnick, Dem.	14,385	20%	Won
Jane Brooks, Rep.	9,792	14%	Lost
Russell Mirabile, Rep.	8,947	13%	Lost
Gary Adams, Rep.	6,178	9%	Lost

- 1994 Race for Maryland House of Delegates – District 7

Voters to choose three:

Name	Votes	Percent	Outcome
Jacob J. Mohorovic Jr., Dem.	16,059	25%	Won
Joseph J. Minnick, Dem.	15,880	25%	Won
John S. Arnick, Dem.	14,469	23%	Won
Jacqueline W. Madison, Rep.	9,149	14%	Lost
Robert J. Parsons, Rep.	7,628	12%	Lost
