= Michael H. Weir Jr. =

American politician (born 1948)

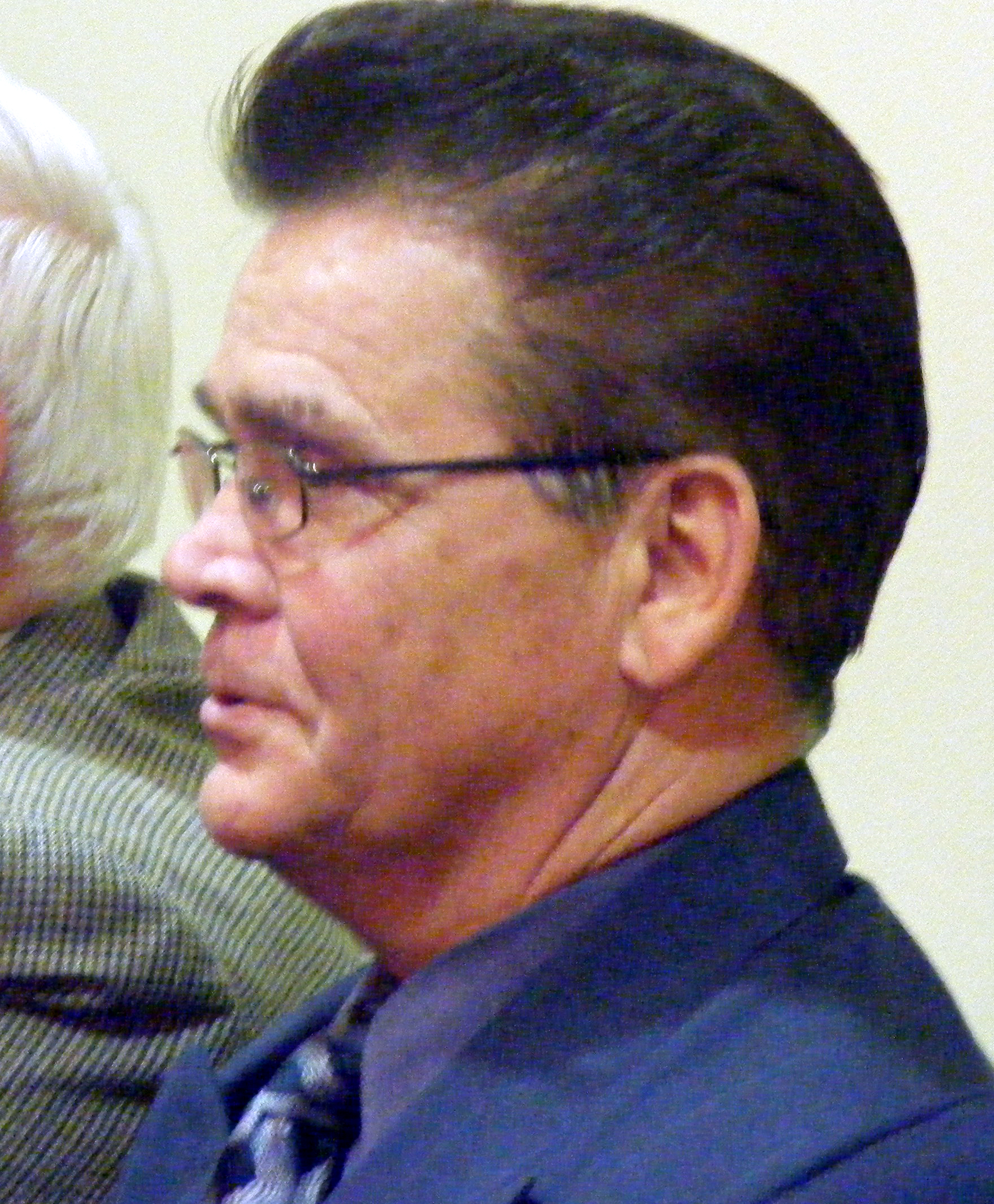

Member of the Maryland House of Delegates from the 6th district
- In office January 8, 2003 – January 14, 2015
- Succeeded by: Richard W. Metzgar
- Constituency: Baltimore County

Personal details
- Born: September 2, 1948 (age 77) Essex, Maryland
- Party: Democratic
- Relations: Delegate Michael Weir Sr. (father)
- Occupation: Firefighter

Michael H. Weir Jr. (born September 2, 1948) is an American politician from Maryland and a member of the Democratic Party.

== Background ==
Weir was born in Essex, Maryland on September 2, 1948. He attended the University of Maryland and University of Baltimore. He has been a firefighter with the Baltimore County Fire Department since 1981. Weir has received a number of awards from gun rights organizations.

== In the legislature ==
Delegate Weir is currently serving in his 3rd term in the Maryland House of Delegates, representing Maryland's District 6 in Baltimore County. Weir is a member of the Environmental Matters Committee.

=== Legislative notes ===
- voted against the Clean Indoor Air Act of 2007 (HB359)
- voted for the Maryland Gang Prosecution Act of 2007 (HB713), subjecting gang members to up to 20 years in prison and/or a fine of up to $100,000
- voted for Jessica's Law (HB 930), eliminating parole for the most violent child sexual predators and creating a mandatory minimum sentence of 25 years in state prison, 2007
- voted for Public Safety – Statewide DNA Database System – Crimes of Violence and Burglary – Post conviction (HB 370), helping to give police officers and prosecutors greater resources to solve crimes and eliminating a backlog of 24,000 unanalyzed DNA samples, leading to 192 arrests, 2008
- voted for Vehicle Laws – Repeated Drunk and Drugged Driving Offenses – Suspension of License (HB 293), strengthening Maryland's drunk driving laws by imposing a mandatory one year license suspension for a person convicted of drunk driving more than once in five years, 2009
- voted for HB 102, creating the House Emergency Medical Services System Workgroup, leading to Maryland's budgeting of $52 million to fund three new Medevac helicopters to replace the State's aging fleet, 2009
- voted against Civil Marriage Protection Act (HB438) - civil marriage rights for same-sex couples, 2012

For the past four years, Delegate Weir has annually voted to support classroom teachers, public schools, police and hospitals in Baltimore County. Since 2002, funding to schools across the State has increased 82%, resulting in Maryland being ranked top in the nation for K-12 education.

== Election results ==
- 2002 Race for Maryland House of Delegates – District 6

Voters to choose three:

Name	Votes	Percent	Outcome
John S. Arnick Dem.	17,541	20.87%	Won
Joseph J. Minnick, Dem.	17,530	20.85%	Won
Michael H. Weir Jr., Dem.	17,958	21.36%	Won
Jane Brooks, Rep.	12,517	14.89%	Lost
Bruce Laing, Rep.	9,448	11.24%	Lost
Paul Michael Blitz, Rep.	8,969	10.67%	Lost
Other Write-Ins	106	0.13%	Lost
