= John S. Arnick =

American politician (1933–2006)

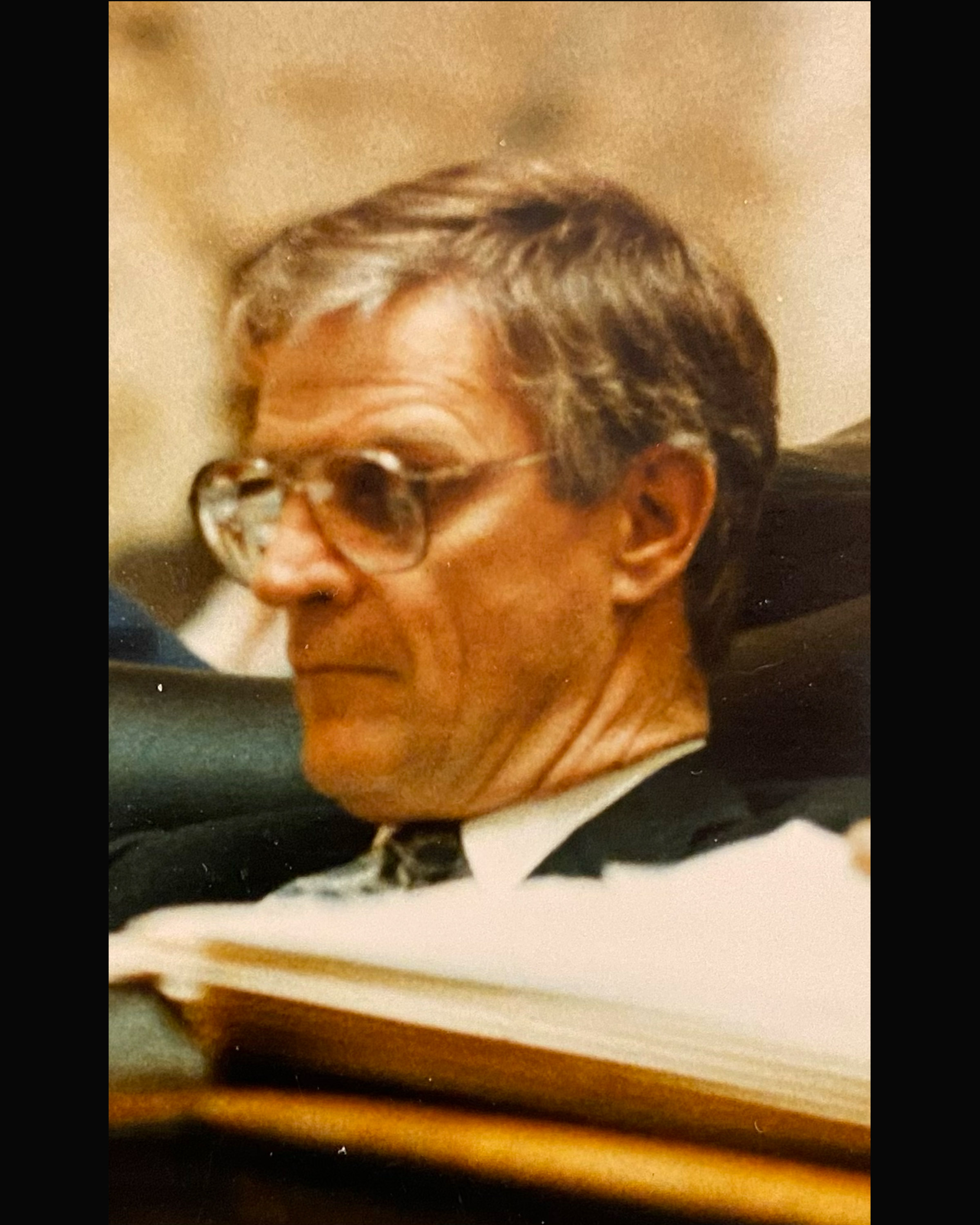

Maryland House of Delegates
- In office October 1993 – April 2006
- Succeeded by: Johnny Olszewski
- Constituency: Districts 6 and 7, Baltimore County

Maryland House of Delegates
- In office 1983–1992

Maryland House of Delegates
- In office 1967–1979

Personal details
- Born: November 27, 1933 Baltimore City, Maryland, U.S.
- Died: June 13, 2006 (aged 72) Baltimore City, Maryland, U.S.
- Party: Democratic

John S. Arnick (November 27, 1933 – June 13, 2006) was an American politician from Maryland and a member of the Democratic Party. He served in three separate spans of time as a member of the Maryland House of Delegates, representing Maryland's District 6 and District 7 in Baltimore County. He died in 2006 due to lung cancer.

== Education ==
Arnick graduated from Calvert Hall College in Towson, Maryland. He then attended and graduated from the University of Baltimore with his bachelor's degree. He later returned to the University of Baltimore's School of Law and graduated with his LL.B. in 1961.

== Career ==
After college Arnick served in the United States Marine Corps from 1956 until 1959. After getting his law degree he was admitted to the Maryland Bar in 1962 and was a practicing attorney.

== Political career ==
John Arnick was first involved in politics in 1967 when he became a Magistrate at Large for Baltimore County. The following year he was elected to office for the first time. During his time in office he served as Majority Leader from 1971 until 1979 and again from 1987 until 1990. Arnick also received the Casper R. Taylor, Jr., Founder's Award from the House of Delegates in 2003. Arnick resigned from the House of Delegates on April 30, 2006, in order to serve on the State Board of Contract Appeals. He was appointed to that position by former Maryland Governor Robert Ehrlich, but died soon afterward.

His political career stumbled a couple of times. In 1978 he ran for a state senate position, but lost. However, he ran for his House seat again in the next election cycle and won.

In 1993, he was nominated by former Maryland governor William Donald Schaefer to a 10-year District Court judge position. However, he was forced to step down after he was charged with making sexist and racist jokes at a dinner in 1992. According to The Washington Post, he was well known for his "salty language and flamboyant behaviour". At the time he had already resigned his seat in the House of Delegates as he had already taken his seat on the judicial bench and was waiting for senate approval. Fortunately for him the Baltimore County Democratic Central Committee reappointed him back to his House Delegate seat.

In addition to being Majority Leader, Delegate Arnick served on many committees and caucuses including:

- Environmental Matters Committee, 2003–06
- Rules and Executive Nominations Committee, 1983–92, 1995–06
- House Chair, Joint Committee on Legislative Ethics, 2003–06
- Joint Commission on the Maryland Port Administration, 2005–06
- Legislative Policy Committee, 1969–79, 1987–92, 1994–2005
- Chair, Environmental Matters Committee, 1972–79, 1987–90
- House Chair, Joint Committee on Administrative, Executive and Legislative Review, 1983–86, 1995–2003
- Economic Matters Committee, 1983–87
- House Chair, Tort and Insurance Reform Oversight Committee, 1987–92
- Special Joint Committee on Energy Pricing, 1990–91
- Chair, Judiciary Committee, 1991–92
- Commerce and Government Matters Committee, 1994–2003
- Chair, House Facilities Committee, 1995–2005
- Special Committee on Gaming, 2001
- Chair, Baltimore County Delegation, 1969–70
- Maryland Legislative Sportsmen's Caucus, 2001–06
- Taxpayers Protection Caucus, 2003–06
- Maryland Veterans Caucus, 2005–06
- National Conference of State Legislatures

== Election results ==
- 2002 Race for Maryland House of Delegates – District 6

Voters to choose three:

Name	Votes	Percent	Outcome
John S. Arnick Dem.	17,541	20.87%	Won
Joseph J. Minnick, Dem.	17,530	20.85%	Won
Michael H. Weir, Jr., Dem.	17,958	21.36%	Won
Jane Brooks, Rep.	12,517	14.89%	Lost
Bruce Laing, Rep.	9,448	11.24%	Lost
Paul Michael Blitz, Rep.	8,969	10.67%	Lost
Other Write-Ins	106	0.13%	Lost

- 1998 Race for Maryland House of Delegates – District 7

Voters to choose three:

Name	Votes	Percent	Outcome
Jacob J. Mohorovic Jr., Dem.	16,338	23%	Won
Joseph J. Minnick, Dem.	15,095	21%	Won
John S. Arnick, Dem.	14,385	20%	Won
Jane Brooks, Rep.	9,792	14%	Lost
Russell Mirabile, Rep.	8,947	13%	Lost
Gary Adams, Rep.	6,178	9%	Lost

- 1994 Race for Maryland House of Delegates – District 7

Voters to choose three:

Name	Votes	Percent	Outcome
Jacob J. Mohorovic Jr., Dem.	16,059	25%	Won
Joseph J. Minnick, Dem.	15,880	25%	Won
John S. Arnick, Dem.	14,469	23%	Won
Jacqueline W. Madison, Rep.	9,149	14%	Lost
Robert J. Parsons, Rep.	7,628	12%	Lost

- 1990 Race for Maryland House of Delegates – District 7

Voters to choose three:

Name	Votes	Percent	Outcome
Connie C. Galiazzo, Dem.	14,307	27%	Won
Louis L. DePazzo, Dem.	13,595	25%	Won
John S. Arnick, Dem.	12,249	23%	Won
Patricia Ann Mohorovic, Rep.	8,079	15%	Lost
Albert W. Weiss, Rep.	5,387	10%	Lost

- 1986 Race for Maryland House of Delegates – District 7

Voters to choose three:

Name	Votes	Percent	Outcome
Robert R. Staab, Dem.	18,956	29%	Won
Louis L. DePazzo, Dem.	18,301	27%	Won
John S. Arnick, Dem.	18,244	27%	Won
Joseph E. Antonelli, Rep.	3,661	6%	Lost
Walter F. Menear Jr., Rep.	3,857	6%	Lost
