= Maryland Legislative District 6 =

American legislative district

Maryland's legislative district 6
- Represents part of Baltimore County
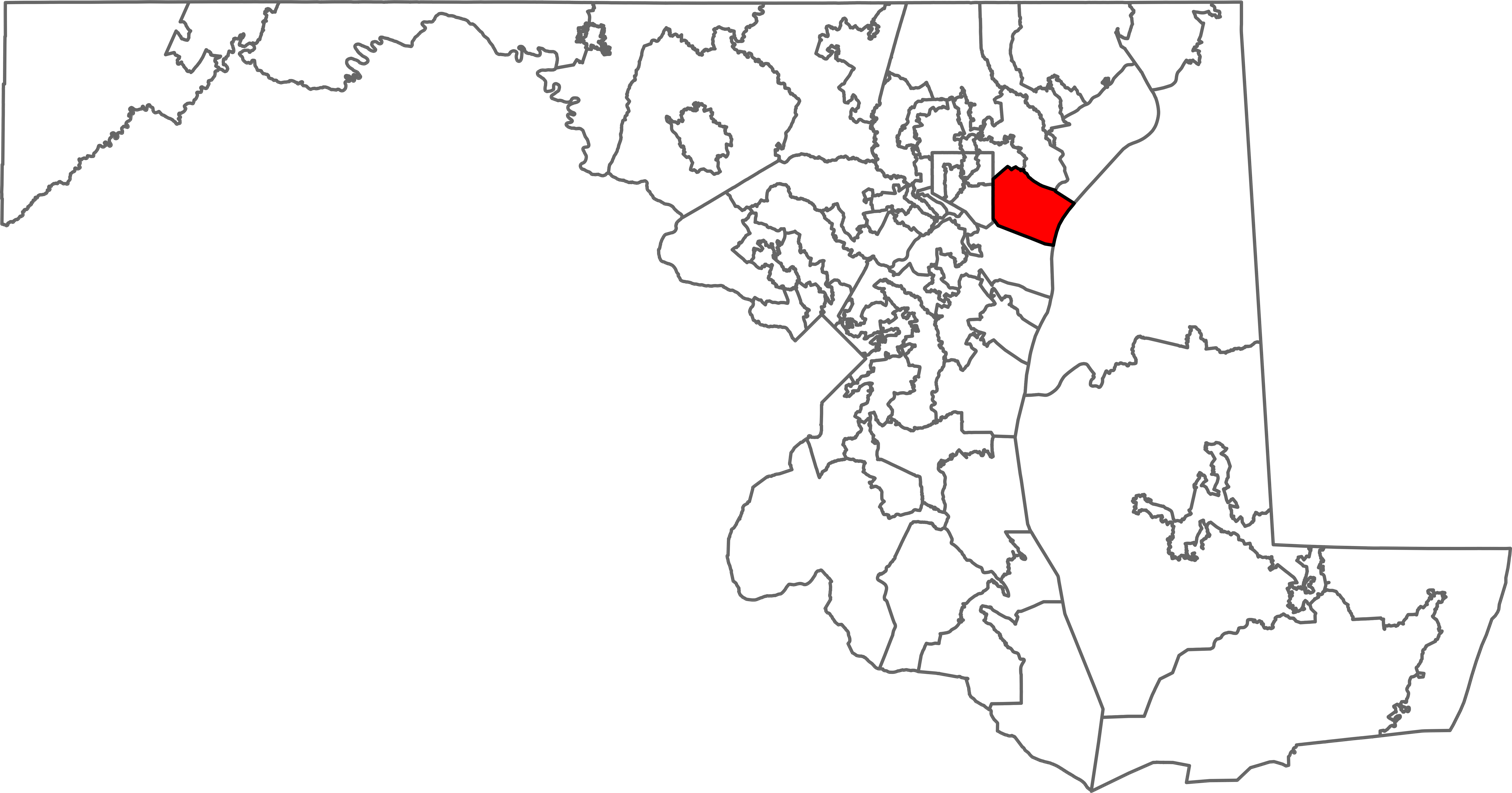
- Senator: Johnny Ray Salling (R)
- Delegate(s): Robin L. Grammer Jr. (R); Robert B. Long (R); Richard W. Metzgar (R)
- Registration: 47.7% Democratic; 30.2% Republican; 20.1% unaffiliated
- Demographics: 61.7% White; 20.2% Black/African American; 0.9% Native American; 2.2% Asian; 0.0% Hawaiian/Pacific Islander; 7.1% Other race; 7.9% Two or more races; 11.1% Hispanic
- Population (2020): 128,766
- Voting-age population: 98,958
- Registered voters: 78,127

Maryland Legislative District 6 is one of 47 districts in the state for the Maryland General Assembly. It covers part of Baltimore County. Three delegates represent the district in the Maryland House of Delegates.

== Demographic characteristics ==
As of the 2020 United States census, the district had a population of 128,766, of whom 98,958 (76.9%) were of voting age. The racial makeup of the district was 79,430 (61.7%) White, 26,074 (20.2%) African American, 1,143 (0.9%) Native American, 2,777 (2.2%) Asian, 34 (0.0264044857%) Pacific Islander, 9,149 (7.1%) from some other race, and 10,146 (7.9%) from two or more races. Hispanic or Latino of any race were 14,299 (11.1%) of the population.

The district had 78,127 registered voters as of October 17, 2020, of whom 15,680 (20.1%) were registered as unaffiliated, 23,619 (30.2%) were registered as Republicans, 37,295 (47.7%) were registered as Democrats, and 931 (1.2%) were registered to other parties.

== Political representation ==
The district is represented for the 2023–2027 legislative term in the State Senate by Johnny Ray Salling (R) and in the House of Delegates by Robin L. Grammer Jr. (R), Robert B. Long (R) and Richard W. Metzgar (R).

== Election history ==
Session	Senate	Delegates		
1975	Arthur Henry Helton, Jr. (D)	George B. Adams, Jr. (D)	William H. Cox, Jr. (D)	Catherine I. Riley (D)
1976	Arthur Henry Helton, Jr. (D)	George B. Adams, Jr. (D)	William H. Cox, Jr. (D)	Catherine I. Riley (D)
1977	Arthur Henry Helton, Jr. (D)	George B. Adams, Jr. (D)	William H. Cox, Jr. (D)	Catherine I. Riley (D)
1978	Arthur Henry Helton, Jr. (D)	George B. Adams, Jr. (D)	William H. Cox, Jr. (D)	Catherine I. Riley (D)
1979	Arthur Henry Helton, Jr. (D)	George B. Adams, Jr. (D)	William H. Cox, Jr. (D)	Catherine I. Riley (D)
1980	Arthur Henry Helton, Jr. (D)	George B. Adams, Jr. (D)	William H. Cox, Jr. (D)	Catherine I. Riley (D)
1981	Arthur Henry Helton, Jr. (D)	George B. Adams, Jr. (D)	William H. Cox, Jr. (D)	Catherine I. Riley (D)
1982	Arthur Henry Helton, Jr. (D)	George B. Adams, Jr. (D)	William H. Cox, Jr. (D)	Catherine I. Riley (D)
1983	Dennis F. Rasmussen (D)	Michael J. Collins (D)	R. Terry Connelly (D)	Michael H. Weir, Sr. (D)
1984	Dennis F. Rasmussen (D)	Michael J. Collins (D)	R. Terry Connelly (D)	Michael H. Weir, Sr. (D)
1985	Dennis F. Rasmussen (D)	Michael J. Collins (D)	R. Terry Connelly (D)	Michael H. Weir, Sr. (D)
1986	Michael J. Collins (D)	E. Farrell Maddox (D)	R. Terry Connelly (D)	Michael H. Weir, Sr. (D)
1987	Michael J. Collins (D)	E. Farrell Maddox (D)	R. Terry Connelly (D)	Michael H. Weir, Sr. (D)
1988	Michael J. Collins (D)	E. Farrell Maddox (D)	R. Terry Connelly (D)	Michael H. Weir, Sr. (D)
1989	Michael J. Collins (D)	E. Farrell Maddox (D)	R. Terry Connelly (D)	Michael H. Weir, Sr. (D)
1990	Michael J. Collins (D)	E. Farrell Maddox (D)	R. Terry Connelly (D)	Michael H. Weir, Sr. (D)
1991	Michael J. Collins (D)	E. Farrell Maddox (D)	Leslie Hutchinson (D)	Michael H. Weir, Sr. (D)
1992	Michael J. Collins (D)	E. Farrell Maddox (D)	Leslie Hutchinson (D)	Michael H. Weir, Sr. (D)
1993	Michael J. Collins (D)	E. Farrell Maddox (D)	Leslie Hutchinson (D)	Michael H. Weir, Sr. (D)
1994	Michael J. Collins (D)	E. Farrell Maddox (D)	Leslie Hutchinson (D)	Michael H. Weir, Sr. (D)
1995	Michael J. Collins (D)	Diane DeCarlo (D)	Kenneth C. Holt (R)	Michael H. Weir, Sr. (D)
1996	Michael J. Collins (D)	Diane DeCarlo (D)	Kenneth C. Holt (R)	Michael H. Weir, Sr. (D)
1997	Michael J. Collins (D)	Diane DeCarlo (D)	Kenneth C. Holt (R)	Michael H. Weir, Sr. (D)
1998	Michael J. Collins (D)	Diane DeCarlo (D)	Kenneth C. Holt (R)	Michael H. Weir, Sr. (D)
1999	Michael J. Collins (D)	Diane DeCarlo (D)	Nancy Hubers (D)	Michael H. Weir, Sr. (D)
2000	Michael J. Collins (D)	Diane DeCarlo (D)	Nancy Hubers (D)	Michael H. Weir, Sr. (D)
2001	Michael J. Collins (D)	Diane DeCarlo (D)	Nancy Hubers (D)	Michael H. Weir, Sr. (D)
2002	Diane DeCarlo (D)	Edmund C. Dotterweich, Jr. (D)	Nancy Hubers (D)	Michael H. Weir, Sr. (D)
2003	Norman R. Stone, Jr. (D)	John S. Arnick (D)	Joseph J. "Sonny" Minnick (D)	Michael H. Weir, Jr. (D)
2004	Norman R. Stone, Jr. (D)	John S. Arnick (D)	Joseph J. "Sonny" Minnick (D)	Michael H. Weir, Jr. (D)
2005	Norman R. Stone, Jr. (D)	John S. Arnick (D)	Joseph J. "Sonny" Minnick (D)	Michael H. Weir, Jr. (D)
2006	Norman R. Stone, Jr. (D)	John A. Olszewski, Jr. (D)	Joseph J. "Sonny" Minnick (D)	Michael H. Weir, Jr. (D)
2007	Norman R. Stone, Jr. (D)	John A. Olszewski, Jr. (D)	Joseph J. "Sonny" Minnick (D)	Michael H. Weir, Jr. (D)
2008	Norman R. Stone, Jr. (D)	John A. Olszewski, Jr. (D)	Joseph J. "Sonny" Minnick (D)	Michael H. Weir, Jr. (D)
2009	Norman R. Stone, Jr. (D)	John A. Olszewski, Jr. (D)	Joseph J. "Sonny" Minnick (D)	Michael H. Weir, Jr. (D)
2010	Norman R. Stone, Jr. (D)	John A. Olszewski, Jr. (D)	Joseph J. "Sonny" Minnick (D)	Michael H. Weir, Jr. (D)
2011	Norman R. Stone, Jr. (D)	John A. Olszewski, Jr. (D)	Joseph J. "Sonny" Minnick (D)	Michael H. Weir, Jr. (D)
2012	Norman R. Stone, Jr. (D)	John A. Olszewski, Jr. (D)	Joseph J. "Sonny" Minnick (D)	Michael H. Weir, Jr. (D)
2013	Norman R. Stone, Jr. (D)	John A. Olszewski, Jr. (D)	Joseph J. "Sonny" Minnick (D)	Michael H. Weir, Jr. (D)
2014	Norman R. Stone, Jr. (D)	John A. Olszewski, Jr. (D)	Joseph J. "Sonny" Minnick (D)	Michael H. Weir, Jr. (D)
2015	Johnny Ray Salling (R)	Richard W. Metzgar (R)	Robin L. Grammer, Jr. (R)	Robert B. Long (R)
2016	Johnny Ray Salling (R)	Richard W. Metzgar (R)	Robin L. Grammer, Jr. (R)	Robert B. Long (R)
2017	Johnny Ray Salling (R)	Richard W. Metzgar (R)	Robin L. Grammer, Jr. (R)	Robert B. Long (R)
2018	Johnny Ray Salling (R)	Richard W. Metzgar (R)	Robin L. Grammer, Jr. (R)	Robert B. Long (R)
2019	Johnny Ray Salling (R)	Richard W. Metzgar (R)	Robin L. Grammer, Jr. (R)	Robert B. Long (R)
2020	Johnny Ray Salling (R)	Richard W. Metzgar (R)	Robin L. Grammer, Jr. (R)	Robert B. Long (R)
2021	Johnny Ray Salling (R)	Richard W. Metzgar (R)	Robin L. Grammer, Jr. (R)	Robert B. Long (R)
2022	Johnny Ray Salling (R)	Richard W. Metzgar (R)	Robin L. Grammer, Jr. (R)	Robert B. Long (R)
2023	Johnny Ray Salling (R)	Richard W. Metzgar (R)	Robin L. Grammer, Jr. (R)	Robert B. Long (R)
2024	Johnny Ray Salling (R)	Richard W. Metzgar (R)	Robin L. Grammer, Jr. (R)	Robert B. Long (R)
2025	Johnny Ray Salling (R)	Richard W. Metzgar (R)	Robin L. Grammer, Jr. (R)	Robert B. Long (R)
2026	Johnny Ray Salling (R)	Richard W. Metzgar (R)	Robin L. Grammer, Jr. (R)	Robert B. Long (R)
2027	Johnny Ray Salling (R)	Richard W. Metzgar (R)	Robin L. Grammer, Jr. (R)	Robert B. Long (R)
2028	Johnny Ray Salling (R)	Richard W. Metzgar (R)	Robin L. Grammer, Jr. (R)	Robert B. Long (R)
2029	Johnny Ray Salling (R)	Richard W. Metzgar (R)	Robin L. Grammer, Jr. (R)	Robert B. Long (R)
2030	Johnny Ray Salling (R)	Richard W. Metzgar (R)	Robin L. Grammer, Jr. (R)	Robert B. Long (R)
