= Breaking the News (2023 film) =

- Directed by: Heather Courtney; Princess A. Hairston; Chelsea Hernandez
- Produced by: Heather Courtney; Princess A. Hairston; Chelsea Hernandez; Diane Quon
- Cinematography: Heather Courtney; Princess A. Hairston; Chelsea Hernandez
- Edited by: Jamie Boyle
- Music by: Gil Talmi
- Production companies: Four Pillars Films; JustFilms/Ford Foundation; Impact Partners; Go-Valley; ITVS; Corporation for Public Broadcasting
- Distributed by: Independent Lens
- Release dates: June 8, 2023 (Tribeca); February 19, 2024
- Running time: 99 minutes
- Country: United States
- Language: English

Breaking the News is a 2023 American documentary film, directed and produced by Heather Courtney, Princess A. Hairston and Chelsea Hernandez. It follows the launch of The 19th, an independent news organization founded by Emily Ramshaw and Amanda Zamora.

The film had its world premiere at the Tribeca Festival on June 8, 2023, and was released on February 19, 2024, by Independent Lens.

== Premise ==
Follows the launch of The 19th, an independent news organization founded by Emily Ramshaw and Amanda Zamora. Chronicling the efforts of women and LGBT journalists, guided to elevate voices left out in the mainstream media.

== Production ==
Production took place during the COVID-19 pandemic.

== Release ==
The film had its world premiere at the Tribeca Festival on June 8, 2023. It also screened at DC/DOX on June 17, 2023, and at the Montclair Film Festival on October 22, 2023. It was released on February 19, 2024, by Independent Lens.

== Reception ==
On the review aggregator website Rotten Tomatoes, 89% of 9 critics' reviews are positive, with an average rating of 7/10.
