= Masana Mulaudzi =

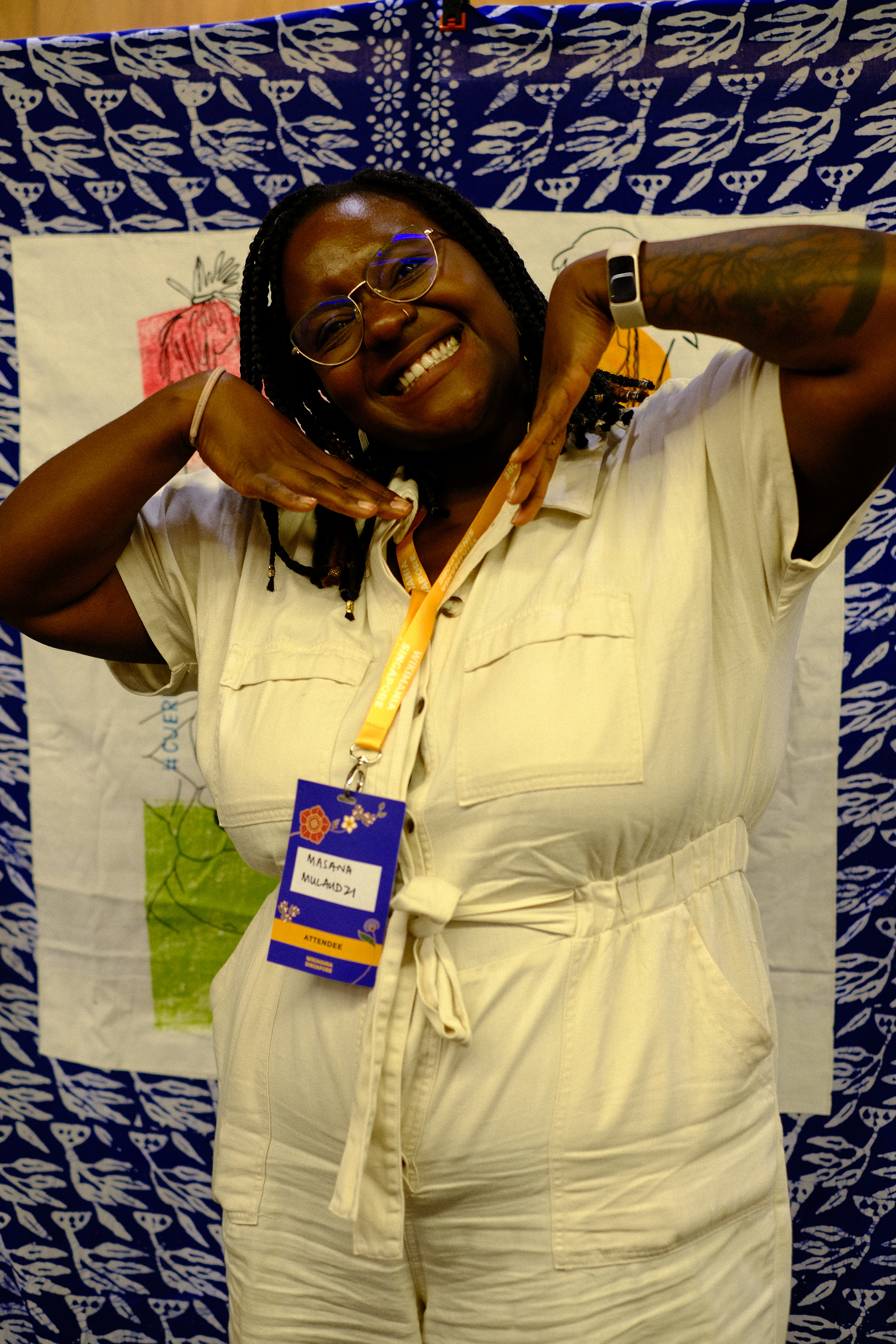
- Education: MSc in Political Economy of Late Development, London School of Economics and Political Science; BA (Hons) in African Studies, University of Cape Town; BCom in Politics, Philosophy and Economics, University of Cape Town
- Alma mater: London School of Economics and Political Science; University of Cape Town
- Occupations: Feminist economist, activist, researcher, community organiser, artist, sangoma
- Employer: Global Fund for the New Economy
- Known for: Feminist movements, gender policy, knowledge equity, labour and AI research
- Notable work: “Triple Jeopardy: Race, Class and Gender among the Black Middle Class in South Africa” “Forging a Resilient Social Contract in South Africa” “The Necessity of Rage in Feminist Parenting”
- Title: Africa Fellow for Labour and AI
- Board member of: Treasurer, Young Feminist Fund
- Awards: Top 100 Women in Gender Policy (aPolitical, 2021); Mandela-Machel Fellow (2011); Chevening Scholar (2012–2013)
- Website: https://masanamulaudzi.com/

Masana Mulaudzi is a South African feminist economist, activist, researcher, and community organiser.

== Personal life and education ==
She holds an MSc in Political Economy of Late Development from the London School of Economics and Political Science, and a BA (Honours) in African Studies and a B.Com. in Politics, Philosophy and Economics from the University of Cape Town. She is a sangoma (indigenous healer) and artist, working on restorative justice, joy, and healing, particularly for black African women and queer communities.

== Career ==
She was recognised in 2021 by aPolitical as one of the Top 100 Women in Gender Policy globally for her work on feminist movements and leadership. She worked at the Wikimedia Foundation as the Senior Manager for Campaign Programs, where she supported organisers working to advance knowledge equity, with a primary focus on gender equity, across the globe. As the senior manager for campaign programs, she said that, "It is inspiring to see the progress made across the African continent to improve gender equity on Wikipedia and beyond".

Masana is currently working at the Global Fund for the New Economy as the Africa Fellow for Labour and AI, analysing the intersection of technology, algorithmic governance, and worker dignity across Africa. She was the Atlantic fellow in the 2017-2018 cohort for Social and Economic Equity, where she produced the documentary and research series “Triple Jeopardy: Race, Class and Gender among the Black Middle Class in South Africa.” She also previously served as the Programme Director at Sonke Gender Justice and a Research Manager at the Centre for the Study of Violence and Reconciliation.

As a researcher, she served as a lead country researcher for the UNDP and conducted systematic reviews for NYU’s Centre on International Cooperation, which focuses on building resilient social contracts and advancing racial and economic equity. She is also a Mandela-Machel Fellow (2011) and a Chevening Scholar (2012 - 2013). In 2018, she was recognised as a Leading Women in their #LSEWomen campaign by the London School of Economics. She served as the Treasurer for the Young Feminist Fund.

== Publications ==
- Lead author on UNDP report (and journal article) “Forging a Resilient Social Contract in South Africa: States and Societies Sustaining Peace in the Post-Apartheid Era” and book chapter, “The Necessity of Rage in Feminist Parenting.”

== See also ==
- Agnes Lydia Oloo
- Purity Kagwiria
