= Amina Doherty =

Nigerian activist

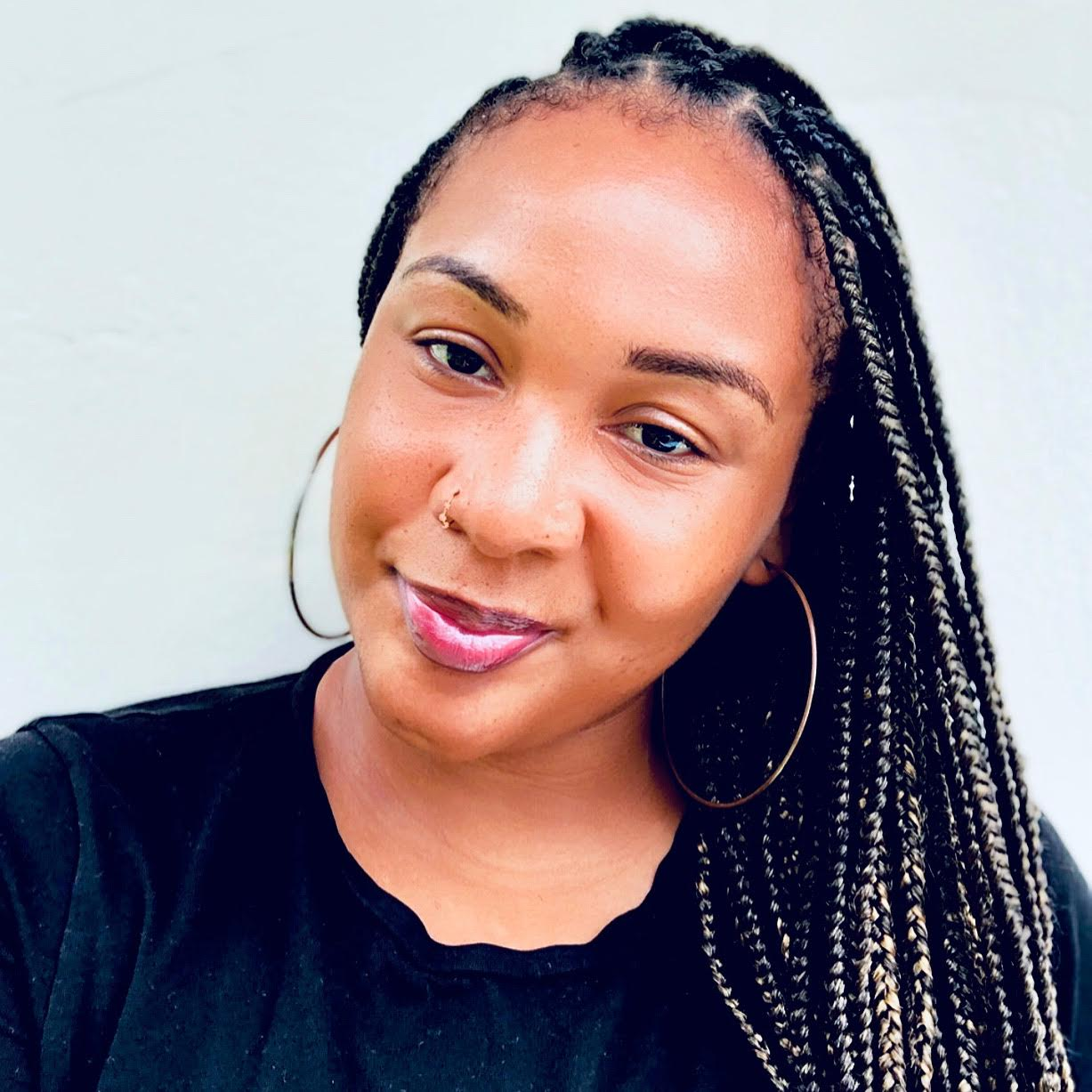
- Amina Doherty
- Citizenship: Nigeria
- Education: McGill University (BA, Political Science & Women's Studies) London School of Economics (Gender, Development and Globalisation)
- Employer(s): Directorate of Gender Affairs in Antigua and Barbuda
- Organization(s): FRIDA | The Young Feminist Fund; Sigrid Rausing Trust; Association for Women’s Rights in Development
- Known for: women's rights advocacy
- Board member of: Global Fund for Women

Amina Doherty is a Nigerian Antiguan feminist, artist and women's rights advocate. As an African-Caribbean feminist and women's rights advocate, her work is centered around raising awareness for social justice through movement-building, and new approaches to philanthropy and grantmaking. Doherty's work takes many forms including art exhibitions, community programs, cultural events, philanthropic advising, and grantmaking initiatives.

== Education ==
Amina Doherty graduated from McGill University with a bachelor's degree in Political Science & Women's Studies. She holds a master's degree in Gender, Development and Globalisation from the London School of Economics.

== Career ==
Amina Doherty began her career working as a researcher at the Directorate of Gender Affairs in Antigua and Barbuda, where she led research for the national report to CEDAW, the Caribbean Policy Development Centre (CPDC) and the Caribbean Association for Feminist Research and Action (CAFRA).

Doherty is a founding member and first Director of FRIDA | The Young Feminist Fund, an organization that aims to strengthen the capacity of young feminist organisations around the world through small grants. Previously, Amina managed funding for women's rights organisations at the Sigrid Rausing Trust, one of the largest private human rights funding organizations in Europe. From 2014 - 2019 Amina worked at the Association for Women's Rights in Development (AWID), an international feminist membership organisation that serves to support, resource and strengthen women's rights organisations and movements.

Since 2019, Doherty is the program director for the Women's Voice and Leadership-Caribbean Project at The Equality Fund, a partnership between actors in feminist organizing, global philanthropy and impact investing.

Doherty currently sits on the board of the Global Fund for Women. She has served in an advisory capacity to Mama Cash, the African Women's Development Fund (2014-2016), the African Feminist Forum, Just Associates (JASS), Foundation for a Just Society (2014), Comic Relief (2014), The MATCH International Women's Fund (2013), and the University of the West Indies (Caribbean Institute in Gender and Development).

Together with Jessica Horn, she is a co-creator for Our Space is Love, an online community platform.
