= 2018 United States Senate election in Maryland =

- November 6, 2018
- Turnout: 58.17% ▼10.03 pp
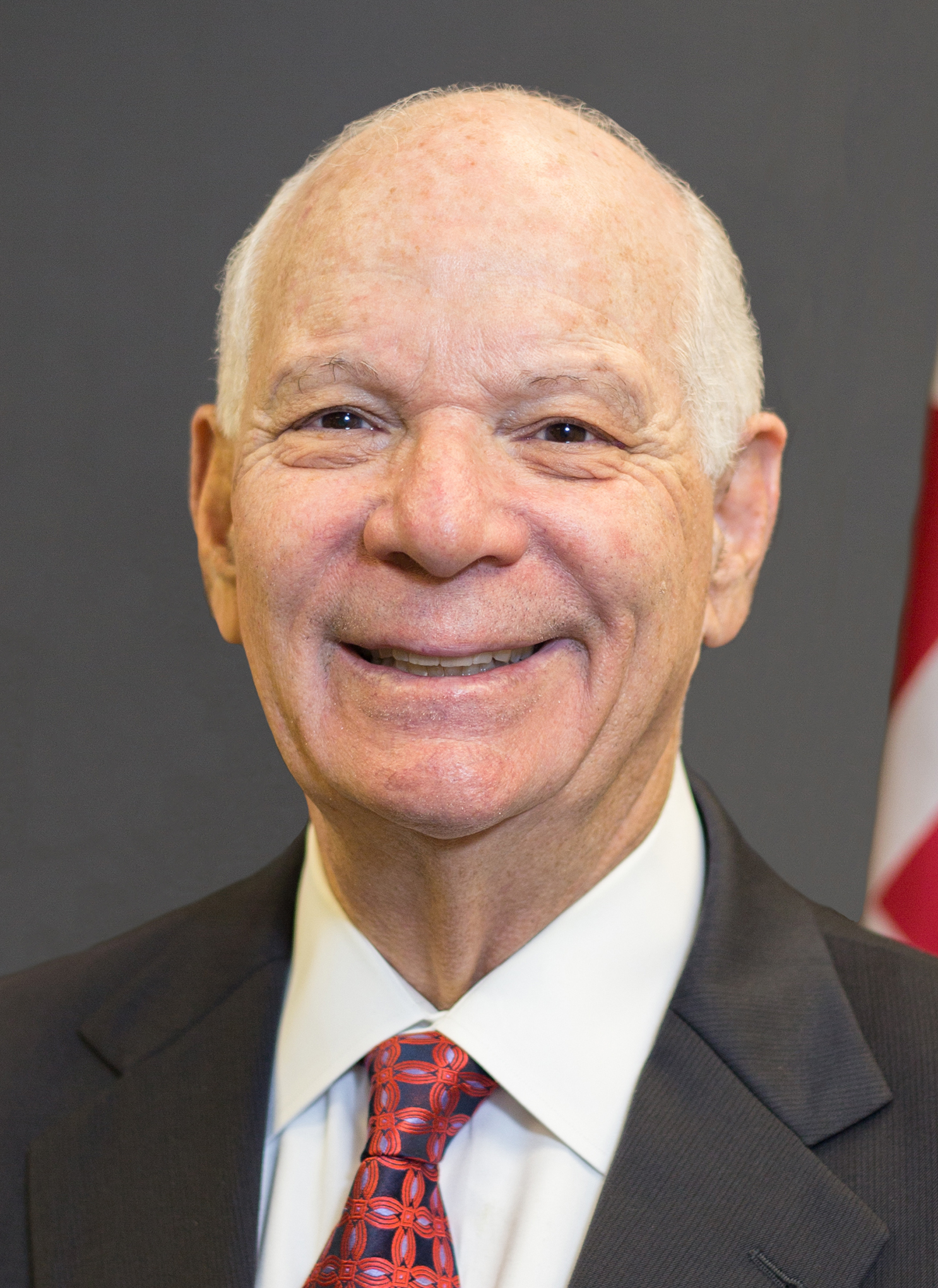

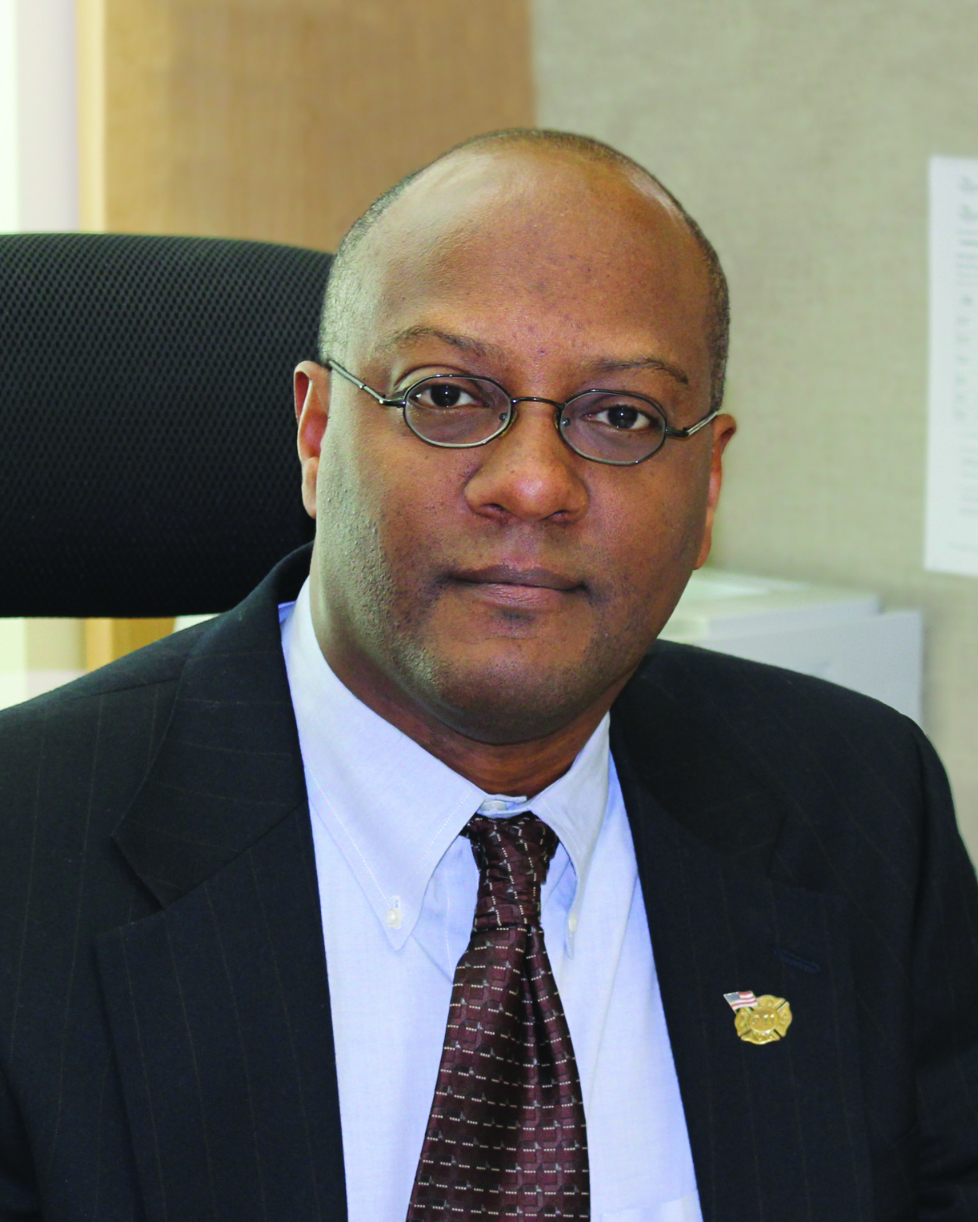
Nominee	Ben Cardin	Tony Campbell
Party	Democratic	Republican
Popular vote	1,491,614	697,017
Percentage	64.86%	30.31%
- Cardin: 40–50% 50–60% 60–70% 70–80% 80–90% >90% Campbell: 40–50% 50–60% 60–70% 70–80% 80–90% >90% Tie: 40–50% No data
U.S. senator before election
Ben Cardin
Democratic
Elected U.S. Senator
Ben Cardin
Democratic

The 2018 United States Senate election in Maryland took place on November 6, 2018, in order to elect a member of the United States Senate to represent the State of Maryland. It was held concurrently with other elections to the United States Senate, elections to the United States House of Representatives, and various state and local elections. Incumbent Democratic U.S. Senator Ben Cardin was re-elected to a third and ultimately final term by a landslide margin of almost 35 points, the largest margin in any election for this seat since Maryland began holding direct elections for Senate in 1913.

The primary election for the Senate race was held on June 26, 2018. The incumbent, Ben Cardin, won the Democratic Party primary. In the general election, Cardin was reelected to a third term. Tony Campbell, a professor of political science at Towson University and former Army chaplain, won the Republican Party primary. If elected, Campbell would have become Maryland's first African American U.S. senator. Businessman Neal Simon ran as an independent, and Arvin Vohra was the Libertarian Party nominee in the general election. There were also several official write-in candidates. With Republican Governor Larry Hogan winning re-election in the same year, this was the first election since 1974 in which Maryland simultaneously voted for a gubernatorial nominee and a U.S. Senate nominee of opposite parties.

== Democratic primary ==
=== Candidates ===
==== Declared ====
- Ben Cardin, incumbent U.S. senator
- Erik Jetmir
- Chelsea Manning, whistleblower, convicted of Espionage Act crimes, former U.S. Army soldier
- Marcia H. Morgan, of Montgomery County
- Jerome Segal, political activist and philosopher
- Richard "Rikki" Vaughn, of Baltimore
- Debbie "Rica" Wilson, candidate for MD-05 in 2016, of White Plains
- Lih Young, perennial candidate, of Montgomery County

==== Declined ====
- Elijah Cummings, U.S. representative
- John Delaney, U.S. representative (running for president in 2020)
- Donna Edwards, former U.S. representative and candidate for the U.S. Senate in 2016 (running for Prince George's county executive)
- Heather Mizeur, former state delegate
- John Sarbanes, U.S. representative

=== Endorsements ===
Ben Cardin

Organizations

- AFSCME Maryland Council 3
- League of Conservation Voters
- Natural Resources Defense Council Action Fund
- Sierra Club

Newspapers

- Baltimore Afro-American
Chelsea Manning

Individuals

- Jimmy Dore, comedian and political commentator
- Linda Sarsour, activist and co-chair of the Women's March
- Natalie Wynn, YouTube creator

=== Polling ===
Poll source	Date(s) administered	Sample size	Margin of error	Ben Cardin	Chelsea Manning	Other	Undecided
Goucher College	February 12–18, 2018	409	± 4.8%	61%	17%	3%	19%

=== Results ===
Results by county: Cardin: 70–80%; 80–90%

Democratic primary results
Party	Candidate	Votes	%
Democratic	Ben Cardin (incumbent)	447,441	79.24%
Democratic	Chelsea Manning	34,611	6.13%
Democratic	Jerome Segal	20,027	3.55%
Democratic	Debbie Wilson	18,953	3.36%
Democratic	Marcia H. Morgan	16,047	2.84%
Democratic	Lih Young	9,874	1.75%
Democratic	Richard Vaughn	9,480	1.68%
Democratic	Erik Jetmir	8,259	1.46%
Total votes		564,692	100.00%

== Republican primary ==
=== Candidates ===
==== Declared ====
- Tony Campbell, of Baltimore County, political science faculty member at Towson University
- Chris Chaffee, candidate for the U.S. Senate in 2016
- Evan M. Cronhardt, of Anne Arundel County
- Nnabu Eze, of Baltimore County, Green nominee for MD-03 in 2016
- John Graziani, candidate for the U.S. Senate in 2016 and candidate for MD-04 in 2014
- Christina J. Grigorian, attorney
- Albert Howard
- Bill Krehnbrink, perennial candidate
- Gerald I. Smith, Jr., conspiracy theorist, of Cecil County
- Blaine Taylor, perennial candidate, of Baltimore County
- Brian Charles Vaeth, perennial candidate

==== Withdrew ====
- Sam Faddis, former CIA officer and candidate for MD-05 in 2016

==== Declined ====
- Larry Hogan, governor of Maryland since 2015 (running for reelection)

=== Endorsements ===
Tony Campbell

State legislators

- Gail H. Bates, state senator
- Wendell R. Beitzel, state delegate
- Andrew Cassilly, state delegate
- Robert G. Cassilly, state senator
- Barrie Ciliberti, state delegate
- Joe Cluster, state delegate
- Ron George, former state delegate
- Glen Glass, state delegate
- Robin L. Grammer, Jr., state delegate
- Michael Hough, state senator
- J. B. Jennings, state senator
- Nic Kipke, state delegate
- Susan W. Krebs, state delegate
- Susan K. McComas, state delegate
- Pat McDonough, state delegate
- Richard W. Metzgar, state delegate
- Christian Miele, state delegate
- Neil Parrott, state delegate
- Edward R. Reilly, state senator
- Johnny Ray Salling, state senator
- Chris West, state delegate
- William J. Wivell, state delegate

Individuals

- Ellen Sauerbrey, former assistant secretary of state for population, refugees, and migration
- Joseph E. Schmitz, former DoD inspector general
- Michael Steele, former RNC chairman and former lieutenant governor of Maryland
Sam Faddis (withdrew)

State senators

- Robert Cassilly, state senator
- Edward R. Reilly, state senator

Individuals

- Paul Becker, retired United States Navy admiral

=== Results ===
Results by county: Campbell: <40%; Chaffee: <40%; 40–50%; 50–60%

Republican primary results
Party	Candidate	Votes	%
Republican	Tony Campbell	51,426	29.22%
Republican	Chris Chaffee	42,328	24.05%
Republican	Christina J. Grigorian	30,786	17.49%
Republican	John Graziani	15,435	8.77%
Republican	Blaine Taylor	8,848	5.03%
Republican	Gerald I. Smith, Jr.	7,564	4.30%
Republican	Brian Vaeth	5,411	3.08%
Republican	Evan M. Cronhardt	4,445	2.53%
Republican	Bill Krehnbrink	3,606	2.05%
Republican	Nnabu Eze	3,442	1.96%
Republican	Albert Howard	2,720	1.55%
Total votes		175,981	100.00%

== Libertarian Party ==
=== Candidates ===
==== Declared ====
- Arvin Vohra, vice chair of the Libertarian National Committee and perennial candidate, of Montgomery County

== Independents ==
=== Candidates ===
==== Declared ====
- Michael B Puskar, property manager
- Edward Shlikas, home care compliance manager
- Neal Simon, businessman

== General election ==
=== Candidates ===
- Tony Campbell, professor at Towson University (R)
- Ben Cardin, incumbent (D)
- Michael B Puskar, property manager (I)
- Neal Simon, businessman (I)
- Arvin Vohra, vice chair of the Libertarian National Committee (L)

=== Endorsements ===
Ben Cardin (D)

Organizations

- AFSCME Maryland Council 3
- League of Conservation Voters
- National Committee to Preserve Social Security and Medicare
- National Organization for Women
- Sierra Club

Newspapers

- Baltimore Afro-American
Tony Campbell (R)

U.S. executive branch officials

- Ben Carson, U.S. secretary of housing and urban development

State senators

- Gail H. Bates, state senator
- Robert G. Cassilly, state senator
- Michael Hough, state senator
- J. B. Jennings, state senator
- Edward R. Reilly, state senator
- Johnny Ray Salling, state senator

State delegates

- Wendell R. Beitzel, state delegate
- Andrew Cassilly, state delegate
- Barrie Ciliberti, state delegate
- Joe Cluster, state delegate
- Ron George, former state delegate
- Glen Glass, state delegate
- Robin L. Grammer, Jr., state delegate
- Nic Kipke, state delegate
- Susan W. Krebs, state delegate
- Susan K. McComas, state delegate
- Pat McDonough, state delegate
- Richard W. Metzgar, state delegate
- Christian Miele, state delegate
- Neil Parrott, state delegate
- Chris West, state delegate
- William J. Wivell, state delegate

Individuals

- Ellen Sauerbrey, former assistant secretary of state for population, refugees, and migration
- Joseph E. Schmitz, former DoD inspector general
- Michael Steele, former RNC chairman and former lieutenant governor of Maryland

Organizations

- Family Research Council
- Maryland Right to Life
- National Association of Wholesaler-Distributors
- National Right to Life
- NRA Political Victory Fund
Neal Simon (I)

Organizations

- Unite America

Individuals

- Larry Hogan, governor of Maryland (Republican)
- Isaac Slade, musician

=== Debates ===
On October 7, 2018, Cardin, independent candidate Neal Simon and Republican candidate Tony Campbell participated in the sole televised debate of the campaign.

=== Predictions ===
Source	Ranking	As of
The Cook Political Report	Safe D	October 26, 2018
Inside Elections	Safe D	November 1, 2018
Sabato's Crystal Ball	Safe D	November 5, 2018
Fox News	Likely D	July 9, 2018
CNN	Safe D	July 12, 2018
RealClearPolitics	Safe D	June 2018

=== Polling ===
Poll source	Date(s) administered	Sample size	Margin of error	Ben Cardin (D)	Tony Campbell (R)	Neal Simon (I)	Other	Undecided
Gonzales Research (I-Simon)	October 1–6, 2018	806	± 3.5%	49%	22%	18%	–	11%
Goucher College	September 11–16, 2018	472	± 4.5%	56%	17%	8%	1%	14%

=== Results ===
2018 United States Senate election in Maryland
Party	Candidate	Votes	%	±%
Democratic	Ben Cardin (incumbent)	1,491,614	64.86%	+8.88%
Republican	Tony Campbell	697,017	30.31%	+3.98%
Independent	Neal Simon	85,964	3.74%	N/A
Libertarian	Arvin Vohra	22,943	1.00%	−0.22%
Write-in		2,351	0.10%	N/A
Total votes		2,299,889	100.00%	N/A
Democratic hold				

==== By county ====
County	Ben Cardin Democratic		Tony Campbell Republican		Neal Simon Independent		Arvin Vohra Libertarian		Write-ins Independent		Margin		Total votes cast
County	#	%	#	%	#	%	#	%	#	%	#	%	Total votes cast
Allegany	8597	36.82%	13790	59.06%	746	3.19%	196	0.84%	20	0.09%	-5193	-22.24%	23349
Anne Arundel	122910	53.74%	92401	40.40%	10528	4.60%	2674	1.17%	190	0.08%	30509	13.34%	228703
Baltimore (City)	160370	86.95%	16184	8.77%	5596	3.03%	1917	1.04%	375	0.20%	144186	78.17%	184442
Baltimore (County)	197530	60.85%	106275	32.74%	17192	5.30%	3313	1.02%	290	0.09%	91255	28.11%	324600
Calvert	17372	44.51%	19901	50.99%	1273	3.26%	458	1.17%	27	0.07%	-2529	-6.48%	39031
Caroline	4265	37.73%	6474	57.27%	451	3.99%	105	0.93%	9	0.08%	-2209	-19.54%	11304
Carroll	25986	34.89%	42479	57.03%	5020	6.74%	966	1.30%	38	0.05%	-16493	-22.14%	74489
Cecil	13237	38.05%	19851	57.06%	1267	3.64%	412	1.18%	24	0.07%	-6614	-19.01%	34791
Charles	44874	69.54%	17872	27.69%	1284	1.99%	462	0.72%	41	0.06%	27002	41.84%	64533
Dorchester	5928	48.23%	5864	47.71%	397	3.23%	95	0.77%	8	0.07%	64	0.52%	12292
Frederick	55256	51.67%	47038	43.99%	3242	3.03%	1292	1.21%	105	0.10%	8218	7.69%	106933
Garrett	2817	25.75%	7801	71.31%	216	1.97%	98	0.90%	7	0.06%	-4984	-45.56%	10939
Harford	45921	41.63%	56749	51.45%	6185	5.61%	1352	1.23%	100	0.09%	-10828	-9.82%	110307
Howard	96067	66.97%	38797	27.05%	6621	4.62%	1819	1.27%	144	0.10%	57270	39.92%	143448
Kent	4588	53.49%	3490	40.69%	411	4.79%	86	1.00%	3	0.03%	1098	12.80%	8578
Montgomery	314568	77.29%	74924	18.41%	13333	3.28%	3655	0.90%	517	0.13%	239644	58.88%	406997
Prince George's	286975	90.10%	24140	7.58%	5031	1.58%	2031	0.64%	346	0.11%	262835	82.52%	318523
Queen Anne's	8463	37.21%	12813	56.34%	1230	5.41%	232	1.02%	6	0.03%	-4350	-19.13%	22744
St. Mary's	16849	41.93%	21393	53.24%	1361	3.39%	559	1.39%	18	0.04%	-4544	-11.31%	40180
Somerset	3652	47.09%	3882	50.06%	172	2.22%	45	0.58%	4	0.05%	-230	-2.97%	7755
Talbot	9054	50.12%	8050	44.56%	796	4.41%	154	0.85%	12	0.07%	1004	5.56%	18066
Washington	19956	39.59%	28319	56.18%	1598	3.17%	507	1.01%	26	0.05%	-8363	-16.59%	50406
Wicomico	16539	49.09%	15644	46.43%	1133	3.36%	351	1.04%	24	0.07%	895	2.66%	33691
Worcester	9840	41.37%	12886	54.17%	881	3.70%	164	0.69%	17	0.07%	-3046	-12.80%	23788
Total	1491614	64.86%	697017	30.31%	85964	3.74%	22943	1.00%	2351	0.10%	794597	34.55%	2299889

Counties that flipped from Republican to Democratic

- Frederick (largest municipality: Frederick)
- Talbot (largest municipality: Easton)

Counties that flipped from Democratic to Republican

- Calvert (largest municipality: Chesapeake Beach)
- Somerset (largest municipality: Princess Anne)

==== By congressional district ====
Cardin won seven of eight congressional districts.

District	Cardin	Campbell	Elected representative
1st	40%	54%	Andy Harris
2nd	65%	30%	Dutch Ruppersberger
3rd	67%	27%	John Sarbanes
4th	79%	18%	Anthony Brown
5th	68%	29%	Steny Hoyer
6th	60%	35%	David Trone
7th	75%	20%	Elijah Cummings
8th	67%	28%	Jamie Raskin

== See also ==
- 2018 United States Senate elections
- 2018 United States elections
