= Chelsea Hernandez =

American documentary filmmaker

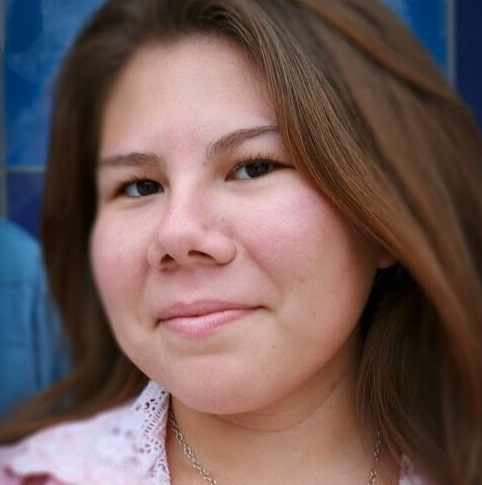
- Hernandez in 2015
- Born: Texas, U.S.
- Education: University of Texas at Austin
- Occupations: Documentary filmmaker; film director; film producer; editor
- Years active: 2012–present

Chelsea Hernandez is a Mexican-American documentary filmmaker, producer, and editor based in Austin, Texas. Known for her socially conscious work centering immigrant communities and underrepresented voices, she is the founder of the Austin-based production company Panda Bear Films. Her feature documentary Building the American Dream (2019) received a National Emmy nomination for Outstanding Business and Economic Documentary and premiered at the SXSW Film Festival before airing on PBS. Her second feature, Breaking the News (2023), co-directed with Heather Courtney and Princess A. Hairston, premiered at the Tribeca Film Festival and aired on Independent Lens. She has won eight Lone Star Emmy Awards as a director, producer, and editor, and was named one of Texas Monthly's "10 Filmmakers on the Rise."

== Early life and education ==
Hernandez grew up in Texas and was the first in her family to graduate from college. Between the ages of 9 and 17, she hosted and co-produced a children's educational television program alongside her mother, an early introduction to media production.

She earned a B.S. in Radio and Television from the University of Texas at Austin and also studied film at Adelphi University and Brooklyn College in New York City.

== Career ==
=== Early work and television ===
Hernandez began her professional career in television, working as an editor and co-producer on Arts In Context (2013–2016), a monthly arts documentary series produced at KLRU-TV, Austin's PBS affiliate, distributed by NETA and airing in approximately 80 percent of PBS markets nationwide. She has also produced and edited content for the El Rey Network, Paramount+, CBS All Access, and PBS, including the eight-episode series United Tacos of America for El Rey and the ten-episode series That Animal Rescue Show for CBS All Access, which was executive produced by Richard Linklater.

In 2012, Hernandez co-directed the short documentary See the Dirt with Erik Mauck, a film about a 14-year-old Georgetown, Texas resident who collects vintage vacuum cleaners. The film won Best Short Documentary at the Austin Film Festival that year.

=== An Uncertain Future (2018) ===
Hernandez directed the short documentary An Uncertain Future (2018), produced in partnership with Field of Vision and Firelight Media as part of the "Our 100 Days" project. The film follows two expectant mothers—one undocumented and one a U.S. citizen—as they navigate increased ICE raids and anti-immigrant hostility during the first 100 days of the Trump administration. The film won the Texas Short Jury Award at SXSW 2018, the Aspen Shorts Youth Jury Award, and a Best Texas Short Special Mention at the Dallas International Film Festival.

=== Building the American Dream (2019) ===
Hernandez's feature directorial debut, Building the American Dream, is a documentary examining undocumented immigrant construction workers in Texas fighting for basic labor protections, including a campaign to mandate ten-minute water breaks every four hours on Texas job sites. The film was produced through Panda Bear Films, with Marisol Medrano serving as co-producer.

The film was partly crowdfunded through Seed&Spark, winning the Seed&Spark/Project Greenlight Digital Studios #UntoldStory Crowdfunding Rally. Hernandez has described working full-time while producing the film and spending three months planning the crowdfunding campaign before its launch, scheduling social media content, press outreach, and promotional materials in advance.

Building the American Dream had its world premiere at the SXSW Film Festival in March 2019. The Hollywood Reporter reviewed the film positively upon its SXSW premiere. In an interview with Remezcla, Hernandez discussed the film's examination of the Texas construction industry's exploitation of undocumented workers and her decision to produce it bilingually in English and Spanish to ensure accessibility for the communities it depicts.

The film was acquired for broadcast by Latino Public Broadcasting's VOCES strand on PBS, airing on September 15, 2020. The film received a National Primetime Emmy Award nomination for Outstanding Business and Economic Documentary and won the Silver Telly Award for Social Impact in 2021. It also won Best Documentary and Best of Show at the 2019 El Paso Film Festival. The film is distributed for educational use by Docuseek and Good Docs.

In a 2019 interview with Hammer to Nail, Hernandez traced her interest in the subject to a 2009 scaffold collapse on the University of Texas at Austin campus and discussed the film's focus on a Dallas city council campaign to require mandatory rest breaks for construction workers.

=== Breaking the News (2023) ===
Hernandez co-directed Breaking the News (2023) with Heather Courtney and Princess A. Hairston, produced by Diane Quon and co-produced with Independent Television Service (ITVS). The film documents the founding and early years of The 19th*, a nonprofit digital news outlet founded by women and LGBTQ+ journalists to address the lack of diversity in U.S. newsrooms.

The film had its world premiere at the Tribeca Film Festival in 2023, where it won the $25,000 Subject Matter and Tribeca Festival documentary grant alongside Every Body. It also received the 2023 David Carr Award for Truth in Nonfiction Filmmaking. The film aired on Independent Lens on PBS on February 19, 2024. In June 2023, the three directors and producer discussed the film's collaborative production process with New York Women in Film & Television (NYWIFT). The Austin Film Society and The 19th* co-presented the film's local Austin premiere on November 1, 2023.

== Fellowships, grants, and recognition ==
Hernandez has received numerous fellowships and grants in recognition of her work. She is a Firelight Media Documentary Lab Fellow (2016–2018), a Tribeca All Access Fellow, a Tribeca Edit Storylab Fellow, a BAVC National Mediamaker Fellow, a Gotham Week Fellow, a NALIP Latino Media Market Fellow, and a recipient of grants from the SFFilm Rainin Fund and the Ford Foundation's Just Films initiative.

In 2022, she was named one of three recipients of the International Documentary Association's Logan Elevate Grant, a $30,000 award for emerging women and non-binary filmmakers of color directing feature-length documentary films.

Texas Monthly named Hernandez one of its "10 Filmmakers on the Rise," describing her and her peers as filmmakers poised to usher in a new era of Texas cinema. In 2021, she was included in DOC NYC's "40 Under 40" class, recognizing outstanding documentary filmmakers under the age of 40. She has also been recognized as a WarnerMedia 150 Artist.

She has won eight Lone Star Emmy Awards as a director, producer, and editor across her career in Texas public media.

== Industry involvement ==
Hernandez serves on the Austin Film Society Filmmaker Advisory Committee. She is a co-founder of Tejanas in Film, a collective dedicated to uplifting the voices of Latina and Latine filmmakers working in Texas. She is also a member of Brown Girls Doc Mafia, the Documentary Producers Alliance, the International Documentary Association, and The Video Consortium.

== Filmography ==
=== Feature documentaries ===
Year	Title	Director	Producer	Notes
2019	Building the American Dream	Yes	Yes	World premiere SXSW 2019; National Emmy nomination; Silver Telly Award; aired on PBS/VOCES
2023	Breaking the News	Yes	Yes	Co-directed with Heather Courtney and Princess A. Hairston; Tribeca Film Festival world premiere; David Carr Award; aired on Independent Lens

=== Short documentaries ===
Year	Title	Director	Notes
2012	See the Dirt	Yes	Co-directed with Erik Mauck; Best Short Documentary, Austin Film Festival
2018	An Uncertain Future	Yes	Produced with Field of Vision and Firelight Media; Texas Short Jury Award, SXSW 2018; Aspen Shorts Youth Jury Award
