= Neal Simon =

American business executive (born 1968)

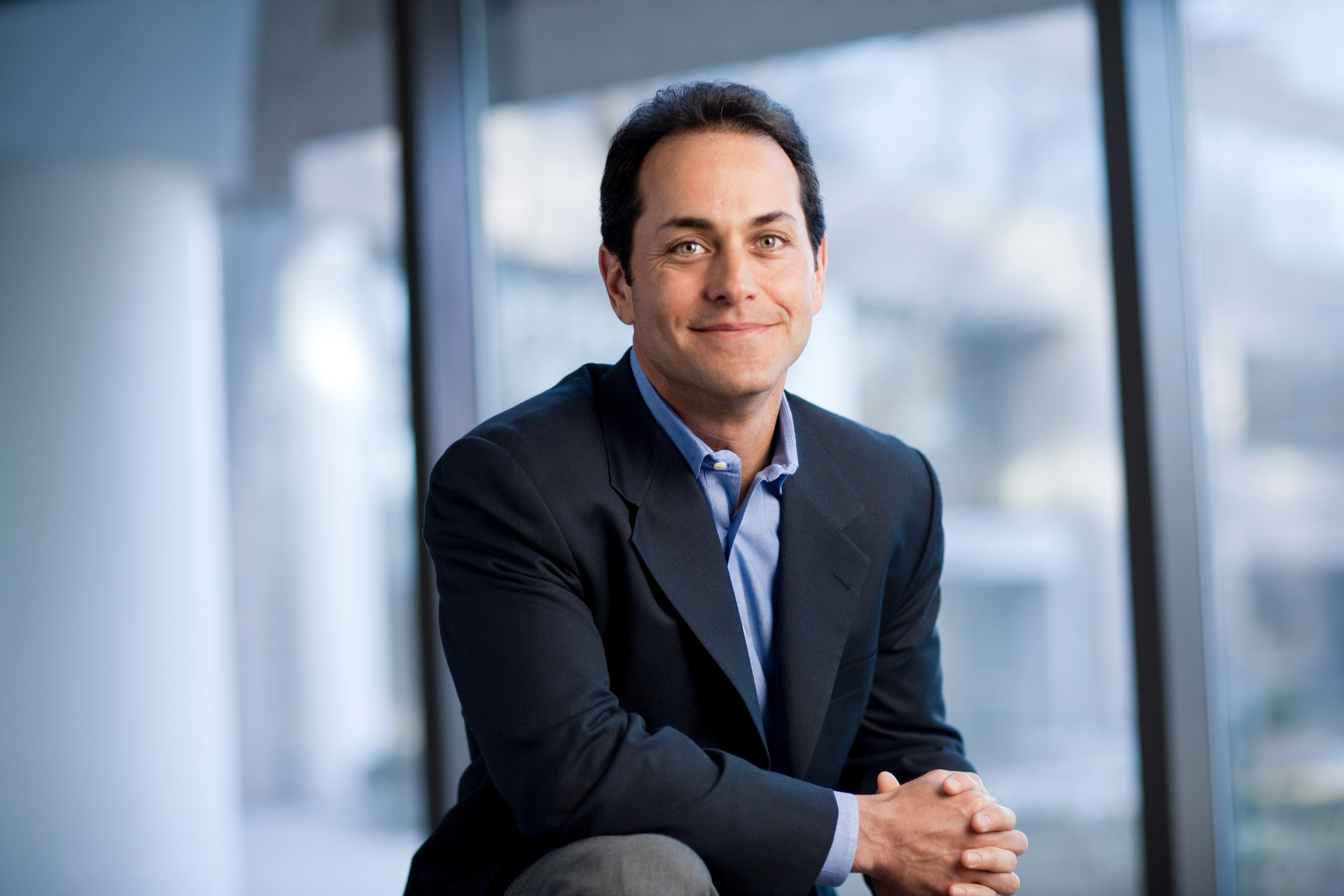
- Born: Neal Jerry Simon; May 1, 1968 (age 58); New York City, New York, U.S.
- Education: Brown University (BA); University of Chicago (MBA)
- Political party: Independent
- Spouse: Jennifer Brown
- Children: 3

Neal Jerry Simon (born May 1, 1968) is a business executive and community leader in Potomac, Maryland.

Simon has led four businesses and has served on the boards of several leading Maryland non-profits. He was the CEO of Bronfman Rothschild, which managed $6.1 billion, until its sale in May 2019. From 2006 to 2008, Simon was the chairman of the board of the Montgomery County Community Foundation and in 2016 Simon was elected chairman of the board of the Greater Washington Community Foundation. In April 2016, Simon and his family were recognized by Interfaith Works as Humanitarians of the Year.

In 2018, Simon ran as an independent candidate for the U.S. Senate in Maryland on a politically centrist platform. Though he at one point polled as high as 18%, he ultimately earned less than 4% of the vote.

Simon is the author of Contract to Unite America: Ten Reforms to Reclaim Our Republic.

== Early life and education ==
Simon was born in New York City, the middle child of Donald Simon and Sylvia Abitbol Simon. At a young age, his family moved to North Woodmere, New York, while his father worked in equipment leasing and his mother worked as a school teacher then a travel agent. In 1986, Simon graduated from George W. Hewlett High School, where he served as class president for three years. Donald Simon was from Brooklyn, NY and is the son of immigrants from Belarus. Simon's mother, Sylvia Abitbol, was born in Casablanca, Morocco.

In 1986, Simon began his studies at Brown University. He also attended the Sorbonne (Universite de Paris) for the summer semester. While at Brown University, Simon attended Tel Aviv University for the spring semester of his junior year, and he spent two summers working for Neuberger Berman in New York, NY. In 1990, he graduated from Brown University with a BA cum laude in Applied Mathematics and Economics. His senior thesis evaluated the impact on Palestinians of work in Israel. Between stints at William Kent International, Simon attended University of Chicago Graduate School of Business where in 1995 he received a Master of Business Administration high honors (top 5% of class). Upon graduation, in recognition largely for his starting and running the business school's Public Service Fellowship program, Simon received the President's Award for Student Volunteer Service.

While at University of Chicago, Simon attended Universidad Catolica in Santiago, Chile, for one trimester. During the summer of 1994, he worked for the World Bank in Washington, DC.

== Business career ==
Simon worked for William Kent International (WKI) from 1990 to 1993 and again from 1995 to 1999. WKI specialized in helping large US corporations build their businesses overseas. Simon's clients included Alcoa, Rockwell, Kennametal, and Rubbermaid. During his time at WKI, he worked in over 30 countries and ultimately became the firm's COO. Simon also served on the Board of the company's joint venture in Rio de Janeiro, Brazil.

In 1999, Simon left WKI to become chairman and CEO of USLaw, a national network of small law firms. USLaw was financed with $15 million led by UBS Capital, and the website USLaw.com quickly became the leader for consumers and small businesses researching their legal issues. The company gained notoriety for its offering online chats with attorneys. At its peak in 2000, the company employed 96. In November 2000, the company laid off 16 of its 96 people in a business restructuring. In late 2001, in the midst of the bursting of the tech bubble, USLaw was sold to Grand Central Holdings in New York City. In October 2000, Simon was recognized by Washington Business Forward as one of the top 40 business leaders under the age of 40 and in December 2000 he appeared on the cover of Money magazine.

After leaving USLaw in 2001, Simon joined the Meltzer Group as its president and COO. In 2002, Simon started a registered investment advisor which four years later became Highline Wealth Management. By 2015, the company managed $1.5 billion and was one of the fifty largest registered investment advisers in the country. On July 31, 2015, Highline was acquired by Bronfman Rothschild. The Washington Post estimated the acquisition price at $30 million.

As part of the transaction, Bronfman Rothschild moved its headquarters to Rockville, Maryland, and Simon was hired as chief executive officer. Simon's new partners included Sir Evelyn Rothschild and Matthew Bronfman. In 2015, Simon appeared on the cover of Charles Schwab's Portraits of Independence, a collection of success stories in investment management. In January 2016, along Matthew Bronfman, Simon appeared on the cover of Financial Advisor magazine. In October 2017, Simon appeared on the cover of Financial Planning magazine, for an article featuring the company's growth. In July 2016, Bronfman Rothschild was recognized by Financial Advisor magazine as the second-fastest growing investment advisory in the country.

In August 2017, Simon hired Michael LaMena as president and COO, creating a new position in the company's leadership team. On March 26, 2019, Bronfman Rothschild announced its sale to NFP Corp. The sale was closed in May 2019, and Simon elected not to be part of the new company. During Simon's 17-year tenure as CEO, the company had grown every year. Simon's former company is now called Wealthspire.

== 2018 U.S. Senate campaign ==
On February 6, 2018, Simon declared his candidacy to represent the state of Maryland in the U.S. Senate as an independent.

Three weeks after the campaign launch, Unite America, a grassroots political organization that advocates for the statewide election of independent candidates, announced their formal endorsement of Simon, Governor Bill Walker (I-AK), Greg Orman, Terry Hayes, and Craig O'Dear. During the first quarter of 2018, Simon's fundraising matched that raised by incumbent Ben Cardin.

On July 19, 2018, Simon submitted over 12,000 signatures to complete Maryland's state requirement for nomination by petition so he could be included on the ballot. Among Simon's signers was Governor Larry Hogan. Simon endorsed Maryland Governor Larry Hogan for re-election and said that Hogan had told him that he had voted for Simon.

On Monday, September 24, Simon's campaign held a rally with Isaac Slade, the lead singer of The Fray, which was Slade's first solo performance.

=== General election debate ===
On Sunday, October 7, Simon participated in a debate against Senator Ben Cardin and Republican candidate Tony Campbell. At the debate, Simon criticized Cardin for "failing to solve a range of problems during 52 years in public office", saying that he wants voters to be able to see "what a different government could look like, and what it might look like if we didn't just have a senator following his party 97 percent of the time." In response to a question about Baltimore's education system, Simon had some of his harshest criticisms.

Simon also made his case against overt partisanship in the Senate, saying "I think the Steelers and Ravens are nicer to each other than the people in the United States Senate." In his closing statement, Simon called for two more debates, which were never scheduled.

=== General election ===
In an October Gonzales Research poll, Simon polled at 18% in the three-way race and had an overwhelming lead among undecided voters over his Democrat and Republican opponents.

In mid-October, Simon suspended advertising and stopped actively fundraising. On November 6, Simon received 84,453 votes for 3.7% of the vote in the general election.

== 2020 book release ==
In January 2020, Simon's book Contract to Unite America: Ten Reforms to Reclaim Our Republic was published through RealClear Publishing. In the book, Simon explores the root causes for political gridlock in national politics, and unveils ten reform prescriptions to create incentives for politicians to work together on behalf of the American people.

Cindy McCain, wife of the late-Senator John McCain praised the book, saying: " My husband always put country ahead of party, and he would be proud to know that other mavericks out there are still doing the same. Contract to Unite America makes a compelling case for reforms that were dear to John: not only campaign finance reform and bipartisan administrations, but also enriched civics education and expanded national service."

CNN and Sirius XM politics host Michael Smerconish wrote in his review, "Whenever I speak about the dysfunction in our politics, which is often, I am asked for solutions. Here at last is what I can recommend. Neal Simon has written a thoughtful, well-sourced, and truly independent prescription for what ails America. This is the book our elected officials hope you never read."

In a review in Real Clear Politics, Morton Kondracke wrote that Simon "has written a dazzlingly effective analysis of what's wrong with our politics and has compiled the best list of specific changes I've encountered in several years of covering America's growing political reform movement....His book is also well-written, clear, forceful, deeply researched, and filled with historical background tales." The book also received praise from Frank Luntz, Michael E. Porter, Jason Altmire, Glenn Nye, Nancy Jacobson, and Evan McMullin.

== Political positions and affiliations ==
Neal Simon identifies himself as a "moderate independent." In the 2018 campaign, he described his fiscal positions as being closer to that of the Republican platform and his social positions as closer to those of the Democratic platform. He supports lower taxes, and advocates strongly for responsible fiscal management of the federal budget, including reducing federal debt. Simon supports same-sex marriage, maintaining the legality of abortion, and universal background checks for gun purchases. On his Senate campaign site, Simon favored a compromise solution for immigration, including tighter border security, nationalizing the E-Verify program, and providing a pathway to citizenship for undocumented immigrants that have been in the country for many years. One of Simon's stated primary objectives was to bring the country together.

Simon advocates several reforms to the political system that are designed to improve the functioning of democracy. Simon supports open primaries, which would allow independent voters to participate in Maryland's primary elections, a system believed to result in more moderate representatives. Simon supports the elimination of gerrymandering for political advantage. He favors either mathematical algorithms or independent commissions to draw congressional districts. Simon supports the mandatory release of tax returns by both the President and the Vice President, and he is an advocate for term limits.

In February 2019, in an op-ed co-authored with Greg Orman in The Wall Street Journal, Simon defended Howard Schultz's right to run as an independent in the 2020 presidential race. In February 2020, in The Bulwark, Simon called for Mitt Romney to launch an independent bid for president along with a Democratic vice presidential candidate.

In March 2019, Unite America announced that Simon had joined their board of directors to help scale the democracy reform movement. Simon is also on the boards of BPC Action (Bipartisan Policy Center) and Stand Up Republic.

== Personal life ==
Simon has been married to Jennifer Brown Simon since 1995. They live in Potomac, Maryland, and have three children.
