= Purity Kagwiria =

- Born: 1982 (age 43–44); Meru County, Kenya
- Education: University of Nairobi (B.A. Gender & Development); Kenya Institute of Mass Communication (Diploma, Journalism); African Leadership University School of Business, Rwanda (MBA)
- Occupations: Feminist activist, journalist, executive director
- Years active: 2004–present
- Known for: Executive Director of Akili Dada; advocacy for girls’ education & gender equality
- Board member of: Humanity United, Kakenya’s Dream; advisory roles: FRIDA Young Feminist Fund & Eyala Blog

Purity Kagwiria (born 1982) is a Kenyan feminist activist and executive director of Akili Dada.

== Early life and background ==
Kagwiria was born in 1982 in Meru County, Kenya. She is passionate about mobilizing resources for the activism of young women, documenting oral herstories, photography, art, reading and cooking.

== Education ==
Kagwiria has a degree in Gender and Development from the University of Nairobi. She has a diploma in journalism from the Kenya Institute of Mass Communication. She gained her Masters in 2018 at the Africa Leadership University School of Business.

== Career ==
Kagwiria has been advocating for the rights of women since the year 2004. She is an active member of the feminist and women's rights movement. She is an Advisory Committee Member of FRIDA, The Young Feminist Fund. She is also a 2013 HOW FUND fellow which is a participating supporter of the East African Girl's Leadership Summit. Purity has advocated for the empowerment of young women to reduce the cases of gender-based violence.

Kagwiria interned at the Coalition On Violence Against Women, COVAW, where she worked with the then Executive Director Anne Gathumbi who helped her gain exposure on gender issues. At COVAW, she collected over 10,000 signatures to postulate the Government of Kenya to sign the Maputo Protocol which was ratified in 2010. Based on this experience, she was able to lay foundation for her activism.

Kagwiria has worked with Pencils for Africa as an executive Board Member. She has also worked with Girl Smart Africa. Purity worked for the African Youth Trust between 2009-2011 as the Project Officer. She worked to build the capacity of women and other stakeholders on Human Rights Law and the dispensation of the 2010 constitution.

== Akili Dada ==
Kagwiria is the Executive Director of Akili Dada, an international award-winning leadership incubator nurturing a generation of girls and young women from underserved backgrounds whose commitment will transform their communities. Akili Dada was founded in 2005 to address the underrepresentation of women in leadership roles. Akili Dada partners with MATCH International Women's Fund, Ford Foundation, Forum SYD, Hivos People Unlimited, Global Fund for Women, Segal Family Foundation, Women and Girls Lead Global, The Global Fund for Children, Millicom Foundation, JJP Family Foundation, Oracle, Mize Family Foundation, Global Fund for Women, American Jewish World Service, Present Purpose, One World Children's Fund, and pencils for Africa among others.

== Awards and recognition ==
Kagwiria was an international guest speaker at the Northern California Grantmakers in 2014. She was among the 18 phenomenal African feminists to know and celebrate. She was listed among the 8 Most Influential African Feminists
