= Agnes Lydia Oloo =

- Citizenship: Kenyan
- Education: University of Nairobi (BA)
- Occupation: Multimedia Journalist
- Employer: Royal Media Services
- Awards: ACCER Award 2022

Agnes Lydia Oloo is a Kenyan multimedia journalist with the Royal Media Services, and is known for reporting issues in environment, climate change, biodiversity and justice for Citizen TV Kenya and Citizen Digital. She was a joint overall winner of the 2022 African Climate Change and Environmental Reporting (ACCER) Award organised by the Pan African Climate Justice Alliance (PACJA).

== Education ==
Agnes earned a Bachelor's degree in Journalism and Mass Communication from the University of Nairobi, Kenya.

== Career ==
She works with Royal Media Services in Nairobi as a videographer and features reporter across the Citizen TV, Citizen Radio and Citizen Digital platforms, producing video and written features on biodiversity, conservation, human rights, pollution and climate policy.

Her bylines at Citizen Digital include coverage of biodiversity and conservation issues such as Kenya's black rhino conservation program, a report for World Rhino Day from Lewa Wildlife Conservancy and an analysis of the environmental and public health implications of second-hand textile imports. She has also reported on justice and climate change topics including the 2024 International Women's Day and Kenya's attraction of Ksh 680 billion investment commitments at COP28, for both Citizen TV and Citizen Digital.

In 2023, she was selected by the Open Mind for Excellence and Global Awareness (OMEGA) as an ORA Africa fellow, a program that trains and supports journalists covering complex global risks.

She was named a CBD fellow by Earth Journalism Network (EJN) in 2024, to cover biodiversity finance and negotiations at COP16.

== Awards and recognition ==
Agnes with Raquel Muigai were joint winners of the ACCER award 2022 based on their entry in the broadcast/TV category for their report "Dry Death".
