= Bad Axe (film) =

2022 American documentary by David Siev

- Directed by: David Siev
- Produced by: Jude Harris; Diane Moy Quon; David Siev; Katarina Vasquez
- Cinematography: David Siev
- Edited by: Rosie Walunas; Peter Wagner
- Music by: Stephanie Kowal
- Production companies: Baker's Dozen Films; Just Films/Ford Foundation; The DeNovo Initiative; Innovation Horizons; Gorilla Flicks
- Distributed by: IFC Films
- Release dates: March 14, 2022 (SXSW); November 18, 2022 (United States)
- Running time: 100 minutes
- Country: United States
- Language: English
- Box office: $20,696

Bad Axe is a 2022 American documentary film directed by David Siev in his feature debut.

== Synopsis ==
In Bad Axe, Michigan, David Siev's Asian-American family struggles to keep their local restaurant afloat amidst racial tensions and the COVID-19 pandemic.

== Release ==
The film premiered at the South by Southwest Film Festival on March 14, 2022. In April, IFC Films acquired the distribution rights. It was released in theaters and via video on demand on November 18, 2022.

== Reception ==
On the review aggregator website Rotten Tomatoes, 95% of 43 reviews are positive. At South by Southwest, the film won the Audience Award and received Special Jury Recognition for Exceptional Intimacy in Storytelling in the Documentary Feature Competition. The film made the short list for the Oscars short list for best documentary feature.
