= Thakoon Panichgul =

Thai-American fashion designer

- Born: Nakhon Phanom Province or Chiang Rai province

Thakoon Panichgul (/təˈkuːn pəˈnɪtʃɡəl/; Thai: ฐากูร พานิชกุล, born 1973) is a Thai-American fashion designer.

== Early life and education ==
Thakoon Panichgul was born in Chiang Rai. or Nakhon Phanom province in Thailand.

He moved to the United States with his family when he was 11 years old and grew up in Bellevue, Nebraska. Panichgul attended Bellevue West High School, where he was a DECA member, attending the international DECA conference in 1993 in Orlando, Florida.

After graduating from Boston University in 1997 with a business degree, he moved to New York City in order to work in the fashion industry.

After starting a career as a fashion writer, Panichgul developed an interest in designing, and eventually pursued formal studies at Parsons School of Design from 2001 to 2003.

== Career ==
In 2000, Panichgul started his fashion career in writing at Harper's Bazaar working as an associate features editor.

Kathryn Murdoch co-founded the Thakoon brand of clothing and accessories with Thakoon in 2004, and remained a partner until its sale in 2015.

In September 2004, Panichgul produced his first ready-to-wear collection and became recognized by fashion press, editors and stylists, as well as celebrities like Rachel Bilson, Demi Moore, Michelle Obama, and Sarah Jessica Parker. In 2007 he produced a fashion line for The Gap after being singled out by Anna Wintour of Vogue Magazine, as chronicled in the 2009 American documentary film, The September Issue.

In 2015, Vivian Chou's company Bright Fame Fashion acquired a controlling interest in Thakoon Corp. for an undisclosed sum; Murdoch sold her share of the business.

In 2009, Panichgul launched Thakoon Addition as a capsule component to his runway collection. Addition subsequently had stand-alone presentations at New York Fashion Week. Through a license with Six London, the brand added shoes to the assortment by 2013.

In 2008, Diego Della Valle signed Panichgul up to create a clothing brand for Hogan. In 2009, he ended his two-year contract as the brand's creative director.

Panchigul produced a well-received limited-edition clothing line at Target in early 2009. In 2012, he made a limited-edition series of lacquers for NARS Cosmetics based on the brights from his spring runway.

In September 2019, after a two-year hiatus away from the industry in which he changed his approach and realized that "it's not about fads and trends anymore", Panichgul launched a direct-to-consumer line on THAKOON.com. His new start-up site aimed to create comfortable clothing from a luxury designer perspective. Panichgul was also the force behind the creative platform HommeGirls: a magazine and retail site that celebrated menswear and tomboy style and culture among women. It was launched via Instagram in March 2019 with images of menswear-inspired fashion.

== Other activities ==
From 2009 and As of 2021, Panichgul has been the creative director of jewelry company Tasaki.

== Recognition ==
Panichgul was a runner-up for the Vogue/CFDA Fashion Fund in 2006, and nominated by the Council of Fashion Designers of America in 2007 for the Swarovski Award for emerging women's wear designer of the year.

His clothing has been worn by U.S. first lady Michelle Obama, who wore a floral dress by Panichgul on the evening her husband, Barack Obama, accepted his party's nomination for president at the 2008 Democratic National Convention.

== Personal life ==
Panichgul and creative director Russell Spina have been in a relationship since the early 2000s. As of 2020 the couple lives in Manhattan's Tribeca neighborhood.
