= Mithika Mwenda =

Co-founder of African climate change activism organisation

Joseph Mithika Mwenda

Executive Director of Panafrican Climate Justice Alliance

Personal details
- Born: Joseph Mithika Mwenda; February 27, 1973 (age 53) Meru County, Kenya
- Education: Moi University
- Occupation: Climate Advocate, Politician
- Profession: Climate Advocate
- Website: www.pacja.org

Joseph Mithika Mwenda, commonly known as Mithika Mwenda (February 27, 1973), is the Kenyan-born co-founder of the African climate change activism organisation Pan African Climate Justice Alliance (PACJA). He has been a climate advocate for over 10 years.

== Early life and education ==
Mithika Mwenda was born in 1973 in Meru County, Kenya. Mwenda studied Education at Moi University where he was a student leader, before attending Jomo Kenyatta University of Agriculture and Technology and earning a Master of Science in public policy analysis. As of 2020, Mwenda was a Ph.D. candidate at the University of the Witwatersrand, School of Governance. He also represents the African civil society in the committee of the World Bank Forest Carbon Partnership Facility, and also chairs the Collaboration Platform of Climate Research for Development in Africa.

== Pan African Climate Justice Alliance ==
Mwenda has been the executive director for Pan African Climate Justice Alliance for more than 10 years. He has experience as a climate change policy advocate and was named one of the most influential people in Climate Change Policy in 2019. Previously, Mwenda worked as a climate change officer with All Africa Conference Churches and Climate Network Africa. Before this, he worked and volunteered in numerous governance and human rights, as well as democracy organisations in Kenya. He was a co-convener of the National Convention Executive Council in the 2000s, which influenced the 2010 draft of the Constitution of Kenya.

== Notable events ==
Mwenda was feted for climate policy activism, and represents civil society in the steering committee of Africa's flagship climate policy and practice coordination platform, ClimDev-Africa, spearheaded by the African Union Commission, African Development Bank and UN Economic Commission for Africa (UNECA). He chairs Institutional Collaboration Platform Climate Research for Development in Africa, run by World Meteorological Organisation, Global Framework for Climate Services, African Union and UNECA. Mwenda has advocated for accelerated implementation of the Paris Agreement, and has made that a focus at PACJA. He also helped establish the African Coalition for Sustainable Energy and Access (ACSEA), to promote the shift to renewable energy, and to ensure the African Renewable Energy Initiative delivers clean energy to poor communities. Under the African Climate Legislation Initiative, PACJA works with Pan African Parliament and other parliamentary institutions to drive climate laws to make climate change prevention part of national development policy.

== Awards ==
Mwenda's efforts as a climate change activist have been recognised for influencing climate change policies in Kenya and other African countries. As PACJA executive director, Mithika Mwenda was selected for the Sierra Club's Earth Care Award 2019 for his contribution to international environmental protection and conservation. In 2019 and again in 2022 , he was named among 100 most influential people in climate change policy in the world by Apolitical.co.
