= Ari Wallach =

American futurist

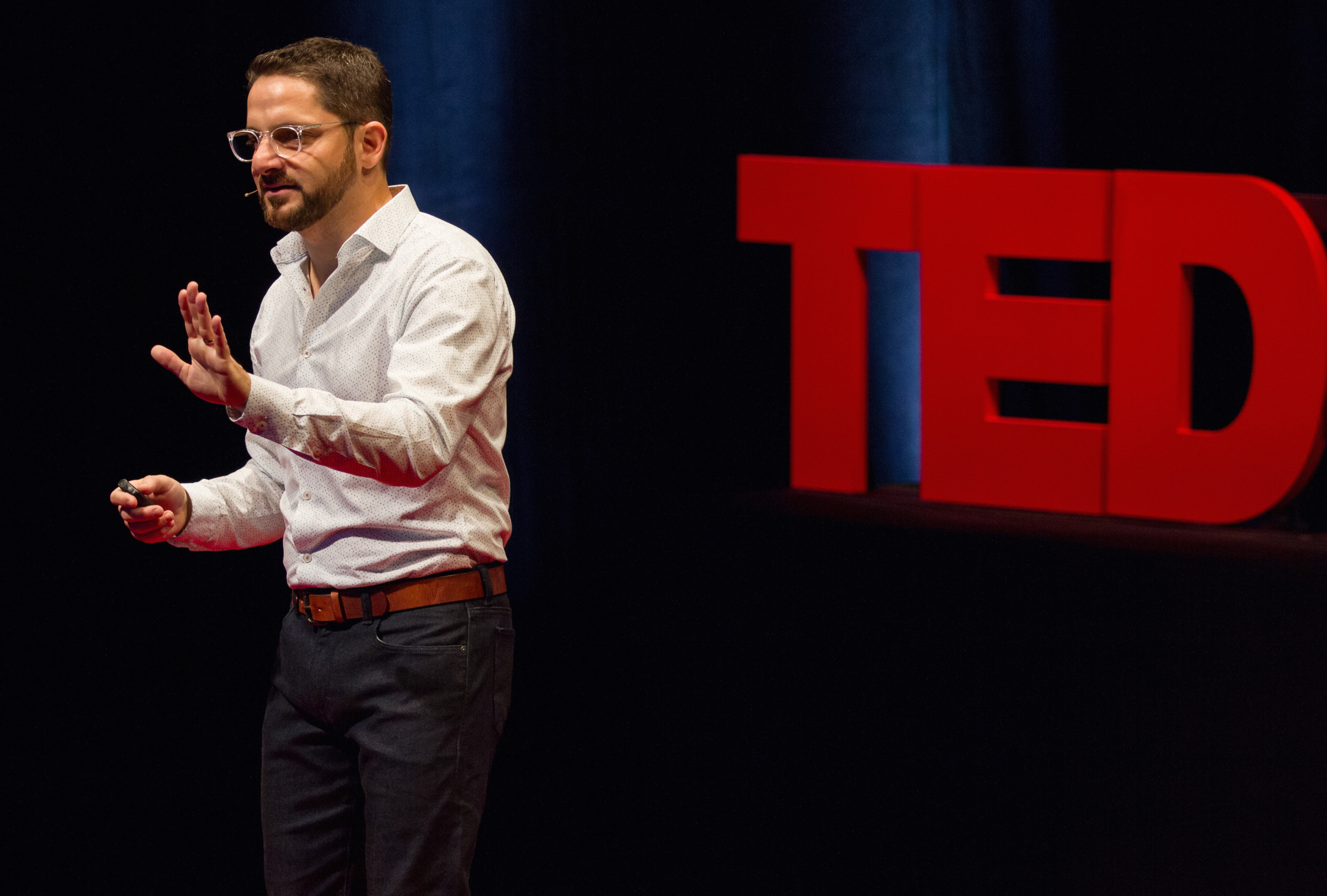
- Born: 1974 (age 51–52); Guadalajara, Mexico
- Education: Northgate High School (Walnut Creek, California)
- Alma mater: University of California, Berkeley Education, BA, Honors, Peace and Conflict Studies; Inter/Intra-national Psychodynamic Conflict Analysis and Resolution (1993-1997)
- Occupations: Founder, Longpath Labs; lecturer
- Spouse: Sharon Goldman Wallach (3 children)
- Website: www.Longpath.org

Ari Wallach (born 1974) is an American futurist. He is the founder of an initiative called Longpath. He also founded Synthesis Corp, a consultancy based in New York City and Washington D.C.

== Early life and education ==
Wallach was born in Guadalajara, Mexico. His father was Raul Wallach, a Polish Holocaust survivor and a member of the Jewish underground during World War II. Wallach was raised in San Francisco Bay Area. Wallach studied Peace and Conflict Studies at the University of California, Berkeley.

== Career ==
Wallach's career has ranged from work in media, government, and various creative fields. He has worked with the Democratic National Committee, Clinton/Gore 96, and the US Institute of Peace in Washington, DC.

He is the founding director of INFORUM, a non-partisan public affairs forum for young people. He later founded re:think media, a producer of public affairs content, and served as Vice President of Seed Media Group from 2006 to 2008. In 2008, Wallach founded The Great Schlep — the viral GOTV campaign that mobilized young Jewish voters for Obama in 2008. The campaign received over 342 million global media impressions and engaged over 25,000 volunteers.

In 2008, he founded Synthesis Corp., a consultancy that works with governments, NGOs, foundations, and corporations to drive innovation, rethink business models, and improve organizational performance. Synthesis is working with the United Nations High Commissioner for Refugees to develop UNHCR labs aimed at enhancing innovation and improving tools and processes to better serve people of concern.

He sits on the boards of 70 Faces Media, blankonblank.org, and the Coalition on the Environment and Jewish Life. He is also an advisory board member of the CITRIS Data and Democracy Initiative at the University of California, Berkeley. He was a lecturer at Columbia University's School of International and Public Affairs, Columbia University on the topics of innovation, the future of governance and public policy.

In November 2015, Fast Company magazine launched "Fast Company Futures with Ari Wallach", an initiative to bring together people from business, technology, policy, and culture sectors.

In April 2024, Wallach hosted a six-part documentary on PBS called "A Brief History of the Future". He is also the co-founder, along with Kathryn Murdoch, of the film, TV and live experiences studio Futurific.
