= Errin Haines =

American journalist

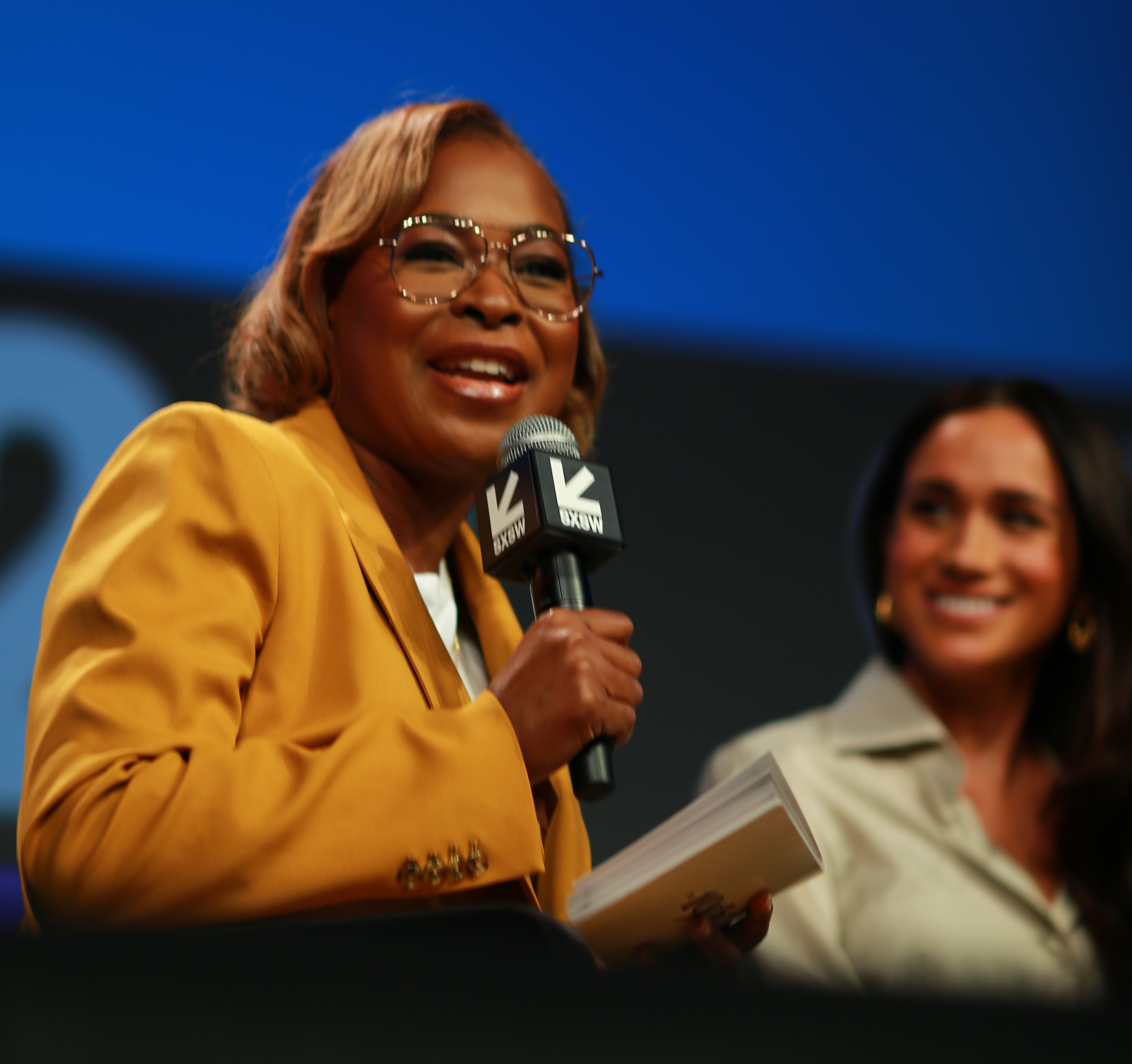
- Haines at SXSW 2024
- Born: 1977 or 1978 (age 48–49); Atlanta, Georgia, U.S.
- Occupation: Journalist
- Writing career
- Language: English
- Subjects: Politics, race, culture
- Website: www.errinwhack.com

Errin Haines (formerly known as Errin Haines Whack) is an American journalist. She writes about politics, civil rights, voting rights, and race. She was the national writer on race for Associated Press from 2017-2020. She was named editor-at-large for the newly launched nonprofit news outlet The 19th in 2020.

== Career ==
=== Journalism ===
Haines began her journalism career as a college intern at the Atlanta Daily World. She later held an internship at the Los Angeles Times. She has held staff positions at The Washington Post and Orlando Sentinel. In 2017 she was named the national writer on race, politics, and culture for Associated Press.

In 2020, Haines was named editor at large of the fledgling nonprofit news outlet The 19th*. As a co-founding member, she left AP to join The 19th* due to structural issues in political journalism that she felt would be better addressed by starting a new outlet. That May, she wrote a story about the shooting of Breonna Taylor after Benjamin Crump encouraged her to look at the case. The article was co-published by The 19th* and The Washington Post and helped bring national attention to the case. She was the first reporter to interview Kamala Harris after her historic vice presidential nomination was announced.

Haines sat on the board of directors of the National Association of Black Journalists from 2011–2015. She is on the board of managers for the Lenfest Institute.

=== Other work ===
In August 2020, she signed a deal with Creative Artists Agency and became an on-air analyst for MSNBC.

Haines signed a two-book deal with Simon & Schuster in 2021. The first, about Black women's role in politics, is slated for release in early 2022.

== Personal life ==
Haines was born and raised in Atlanta. She resides in Philadelphia.

== Accolades ==
- 2006 – Emerging Journalist of the Year, National Association of Black Journalists
- 2009 – Award of Excellence, Atlanta Press Club
- 2017 – Print Journalist of the Year, Philadelphia Association of Black Journalists
- 2020 – Vernon Jarrett Medal for Journalistic Excellence, Morgan State University
