= Emily Ramshaw =

News executive, founder of The 19th and formerly head of Texas Tribune

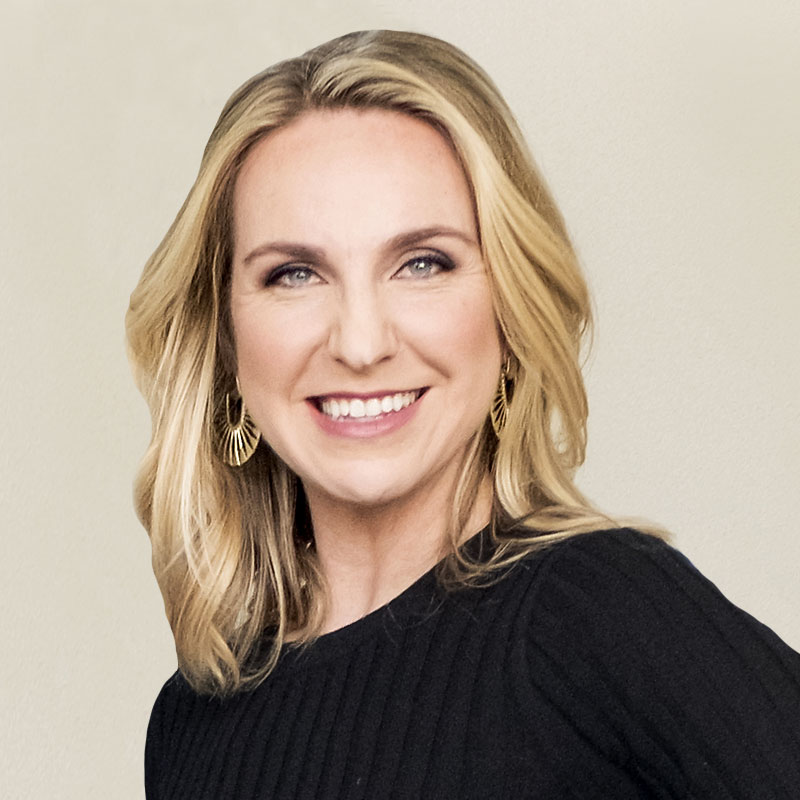
- Born: Washington, D.C., U.S.
- Education: Northwestern University
- Occupations: Journalist; news executive
- Known for: Co-founder and CEO of The 19th
- Spouse: David Hartstein (m. 2010)
- Children: 1
- Parent(s): Gregg Ramshaw; Mary Leonard

Emily Ramshaw is an American journalist and news executive. She is the co-founder and CEO of The 19th*, an independent nonprofit newsroom reporting at the intersection of gender, politics and policy in the U.S. The 19th's mission is to elevate the voices of women, people of color and the LGBTQ+ community, and to arm them with the information, resources and community they need to be equal participants in American democracy. The 19th* gives all of its journalism away for free, to readers and to every other news organization in America.

== Early life and education ==
Ramshaw was born in Washington, D.C., to Mary Leonard and Gregg Ramshaw, both journalists. Her mother had a 30-year-career as a Washington correspondent and editor, and her father was a managing producer and news editor for PBS's NewsHour with Jim Lehrer.

Ramshaw graduated magna cum laude from Northwestern University in 2003 with a double major in journalism and American history.

== Career ==
=== The Dallas Morning News ===
Prior to joining The Texas Tribune, Ramshaw spent six years at The Dallas Morning News, where she exposed stories about sexual abuse inside Texas' juvenile detention centers, reported from inside a West Texas polygamist compound and uncovered "fight clubs" inside state institutions for people with disabilities.

=== The Texas Tribune ===
In 2010 Ramshaw joined the nonprofit, nonpartisan digital news startup The Texas Tribune as a founding reporter. By 2016 she had been named editor-in-chief of the news organization, considered the gold standard for sustainability in nonprofit news. Under her leadership, The Texas Tribune won a Peabody Award, several national Edward R. Murrow Awards and top honors from the Online News Association.

=== The 19th* ===
After announcing their departure from The Texas Tribune in December 2019, Ramshaw and co-founder Amanda Zamora introduced their new venture, The 19th*, in January 2020. The name is a reference to the Nineteenth Amendment to the United States Constitution, which took effect on August 26, 1920, and prohibits the states and the federal government from denying the right to vote to citizens of the United States on the basis of sex. The asterisk used in the stylized name (The 19th*) is intended to serve as a visible reminder that millions of people, including women of color, were excluded from the ballot box for generations.

Ramshaw said she first thought about creating a national newsroom that would report on gender, politics and policy in 2016, telling USA TODAY, "The idea first entered my head when I was on maternity leave with my daughter. It was during the 2016 election, and we were seeing so many conversations around electability and likability, which are two words that are basically only used for women.... I didn't think about it much for another three years, until we entered the 2020 election cycle. And suddenly those exact same conversations about electability and likability were coming up, even though we had more women on the presidential debate stage than we'd ever had before."

The news organization launched its full destination website in August 2020 followed by a week-long summit that included the first interview with newly-named vice presidential candidate Kamala Harris, and a one-on-one interview with Meghan, The Duchess of Sussex. In January 2021, The 19th* expanded its mission statement to serve not just women but also the LGBTQ+ community.

Early funders of The 19th* include American philanthropist and Craigslist founder Craig Newmark, who donated $500,000 in its early stages; and Kathryn Murdoch, Rupert Murdoch's daughter-in-law, who invested $4 million. As of February 2023 The 19th* had raised over $40 million.

== Awards and honors ==
Ramshaw was named to Fortune Magazine’s 40 Under 40 list in 2020. In 2016, she was elected to the Pulitzer Prize Board, where she is serving a nine-year term.

== Personal life ==
Ramshaw married David Hartstein in 2010 in Austin, Texas. Hartstein is an Emmy and Independent Spirit Award-winning feature film producer of documentary, fiction and commercials, whose credits include Sister Aimee (2019), The Sensitives (2018), Where Soldiers Come From (2011), P.O.V. (1988) and Along Came Kinky... Texas Jewboy for Governor (2009). Ramshaw and Hartstein have one daughter.
