= Minding the Gap =

2018 documentary film by Bing Liu

- Directed by: Bing Liu
- Produced by: Diane Moy Quon; Bing Liu
- Starring: Zack Mulligan; Keire Johnson; Bing Liu
- Cinematography: Bing Liu
- Edited by: Joshua Altman; Bing Liu
- Music by: Nathan Halpern; Chris Ruggiero
- Production companies: Kartemquin Films; American Documentary/POV; ITVS
- Distributed by: Hulu; Magnolia Pictures
- Release date: January 21, 2018 (Sundance)
- Running time: 93 minutes
- Country: United States
- Language: English

Minding the Gap is a 2018 documentary film directed by Bing Liu and produced by Liu and Diane Moy Quon through Kartemquin Films. It chronicles the lives and friendships of three young men growing up in Rockford, Illinois, united by their love of skateboarding. The film received critical acclaim, won the U.S. Documentary Special Jury Award for Breakthrough Filmmaking at the 2018 Sundance Film Festival, and was nominated for Best Documentary Feature at the 91st Academy Awards.

== Summary ==
Bing Liu lives in Rockford, Illinois, as do two friends he met through skateboarding: Keire Johnson and Zack Mulligan. As they reach adulthood, Zack becomes a father and gets a job as a roofer to support his family, while Keire finds work as a dishwasher.

Over the course of the film, all three friends reveal that they grew up in abusive homes. Zack and his partner Nina begin to have difficulties in their relationship, and Bing learns that Zack may have been abusive towards Nina. A venture to create an indoor skatepark falls apart and Zack is left with fewer options. Nina repeatedly leaves him.

Keire becomes a waiter and focuses on trying to educate himself. He grows apart from Zack and finds himself chafing against the racism of the town, which even comes from his friends. Though his father was abusive, he finds himself reflecting on positive memories of their relationship and the ways in which his father influenced him.

Interspersed with Zack and Keire's stories is footage from an interview Bing Liu conducted with his mother, during which he asks her if she knew his stepdad (her second husband) had abused him when she was not around. She mentions that he was also abusive to her, but she stayed with him because he was sweet when he was not being abusive. Eventually, she breaks down crying, telling Bing she wants to help him recover but urging him not to dwell on the past.

Zack and Nina finally separate for good, and they have a contentious relationship, with Nina filing for child support after Zack abruptly leaves the state. He eventually returns and slides further into alcoholism, struggling with how his decisions might affect his young son. In a final interview with Bing, Zack tacitly admits to hitting Nina when they were together.

Keire finally earns enough money to move to Denver. A post-script reveals that Nina is pursuing a degree, Zack has been promoted at work, and Keire has been successful in Denver pursuing both his educational goals and a career as a professional skateboarder.

== Release ==
Minding the Gap premiered at the 2018 Sundance Film Festival, where it received the U.S. Documentary Special Jury Award for Breakthrough Filmmaking. In June 2018, Hulu acquired its distribution rights, and the film was released theatrically and on Hulu on August 17, 2018. It aired on PBS on February 18, 2019, as part of the network's POV series.

In 2021, the film was released on DVD and Blu-ray by The Criterion Collection.

== Reception ==
On the review aggregator website Rotten Tomatoes, 100% of 130 critics' reviews of the film are positive, with an average rating of 8.7/10; the site's "critics consensus" reads: "Minding the Gap draws on more than a decade of documentary footage to assemble a poignant picture of young American lives that resonates far beyond its onscreen subjects." On Metacritic, the film has a weighted average score of 89 out of 100 based on 28 reviews, indicating "universal acclaim".

A. O. Scott of the New York Times called the film an "astonishing debut feature", and "a rich, devastating essay on race, class and manhood in 21st-century America." Sophie Gilbert of The Atlantic called it "an extraordinary feat of filmmaking." Richard Brody of The New Yorker wrote that the images of skateboarding "are merely the background and context for the film," whose "substance—domestic trauma, systemic racism, and economic dislocation—is also the very stuff of society, and the near-at-hand intimacy gives rise to a film of vast scope and political depth."

Former U.S. President—and Illinoisian—Barack Obama cited the film as one of his favorites of 2018.

=== Accolades ===
The film was nominated for Best Documentary Feature and the Truer Than Fiction Award at the 34th Independent Spirit Awards, and it was also nominated for five Critics' Choice Awards. It was named one of the Top Five Documentaries of the year by the National Board of Review, won a 2018 Peabody Award, and won the New York Film Critics Circle's award for Best Non-Fiction Film. After being shortlisted, Minding the Gap was nominated for the Academy Award for Best Documentary Feature at the 91st Academy Awards.

== Interpretations ==
Jay Caspian Kang (The Criterion Collection)

Jay Caspian Kang, in a 2021 essay published by The Criterion Collection, attempts to unpack Minding the Gap by defining the cinematography of the skateboarding genre. When examining the genre, he finds a stark difference in Liu’s cinematography. Liu favors eye-level shots of skateboarding that draw the viewer to a feeling of connection with the subjects, rather than the whimsy of the typical skateboarding film. This connection, established in the camerawork, digs deeper as the documentary follows the personal lives of Zack and Keire. In following their lives, Liu feels inclined to join the story. This opens the film up to an exploration of familial trauma. However, Kang notes that these heavily traumatic moments are paired with moments of joy, some skateboarding, others not. The editing choices in narrative structure create a basis for Kang to claim that skateboarding functions as an escape from an ugly world, yet this escape is unachievable since the subject will always have to face reality. Kang's analysis ends with a summative quote, “We know these boys will not find salvation or absolution in skateboarding, but we also understand why they will keep trying.”

== See also ==
- List of films with a 100% rating on Rotten Tomatoes
