= A Brief History of the Future (TV series) =

- Written by: Andrew Morgan
- Directed by: Andrew Morgan
- Presented by: Ari Wallach
- Starring: Ari Wallach
- Music by: Duncan Blickenstaff
- Country of origin: United States
- Original language: English
- No. of seasons: 1
- No. of episodes: 6

Production
- Executive producers: Peter Nelson Jason Shrier; Drake; Kathryn Murdoch; Wendy Schmidt Ari Wallach
- Production company: Futurific Studios

Original release
- Network: PBS
- Release: April 3, 2024

A Brief History of the Future is a 2024 six-part documentary series produced by PBS that explores potential futures for humanity, hosted by futurist Ari Wallach.

== Synopsis ==
The series takes viewers on a global journey to meet with scientists, entrepreneurs, and visionaries who are shaping the world of tomorrow.

== Production ==
A Brief History of the Future was written and directed by Andrew Morgan and produced by Zach Morgan of UNTOLD. The series was executive produced by Kathryn Murdoch, Ari Wallach, Wendy Schmidt, and Canadian musician Drake's DreamCrew.

It was produced at Futurific Studios, co-founded by Murdoch and Wallach in 2023. The studio is intended to be a place for creatives to work on ideas relating to "protopia", a word coined by Wired co-founder Kevin Kelly, meaning "a state that is better today than yesterday". It implies practical solutions to big global challenges, rather than just presenting dystopian narratives.

It is a documentary series comprising six episodes. Theme music is by Grimes who is also interviewed in one of the episodes.

== Release ==
The series premiered on Tuesday, April 2, 2024, at a private screening in Museum of Modern Art in the New York City.

The first episode of the series aired on Wednesday, April 3, 2024, on PBS in the United States.

== Reception ==
The show opened to generally positive reviews. Devin Coldewey of TechCrunch praised it for its positive commentary, "From mushroom leather to ocean cleanup to death doulas, Wallach finds people who see the same scary future we do but are choosing to do something about it, even if that thing seems hopelessly small or naïve."

== Legacy ==
The show also produced additional content while filming the show to be used for educational purposes in the classrooms, called "Futures Literacy", and available on PBS Learning Media.
