= Diane Moy Quon =

American film producer

Diane Moy Quon (born in Chicago) is an American film producer. She has produced Minding the Gap (2018), for which she received an Academy Award nomination, Finding Yingying (2020), Bad Axe (2022), Breaking the News, (2023), The Taste of Mango (2023), and AKA Mr. Chow (2023).

== Career ==
Quon previously worked in marketing for NBC and Paramount Pictures. Quon later joined Kartemquin Films and transitioned into documentary film production.

Quon has produced Minding the Gap directed by Bing Liu, for which she earned an Academy Award nomination. The film was distributed by Hulu and POV.

She has additionally produced Finding Yingying directed by Jiayan "Jenny" Shi, Wuhan Wuhan directed by Yung Chang, and Bad Axe directed by David Siev.

== Filmography ==
- Minding the Gap, (2018)
- Circle of Iris (short), (2019)
- Down a Dark Stairwell, (2019)
- The Dilemma of Desire, (2020)
- Finding Yingying, (2020)
- Left-Handed Pianist, (2020)
- Wuhan Wuhan, (2020)
- Surf Nation, (2022)
- Bad Axe, (2022)
- Breaking the News (2023)
