= Financial Advisor (magazine) =

American monthly financial services magazine

- Cover of the June 2010 issue
- Editor: Evan Simonoff
- Frequency: Monthly
- Circulation: 110,000
- Publisher: Charter Financial Publishing Network
- Founded: 2000
- Country: United States
- Based in: Shrewsbury, New Jersey
- Website: www.fa-mag.com

Financial Advisor is a monthly financial services magazine which delivers market information for financial advisors.

== Overview ==
The magazine was launched in 2000 and it is headquartered in Shrewsbury, New Jersey. Its articles focus on strategies and management advice for advisors of affluent clients. Its targeted readership includes financial planners, investment advisors, and broker-dealers.

== Circulation ==
Financial Advisor is published by Charter Financial Publishing Network, Shrewsbury, New Jersey and has a circulation of 110,000 copies.
