= ITVS =

American public television documentary funder

ITVS (Independent Television Service)
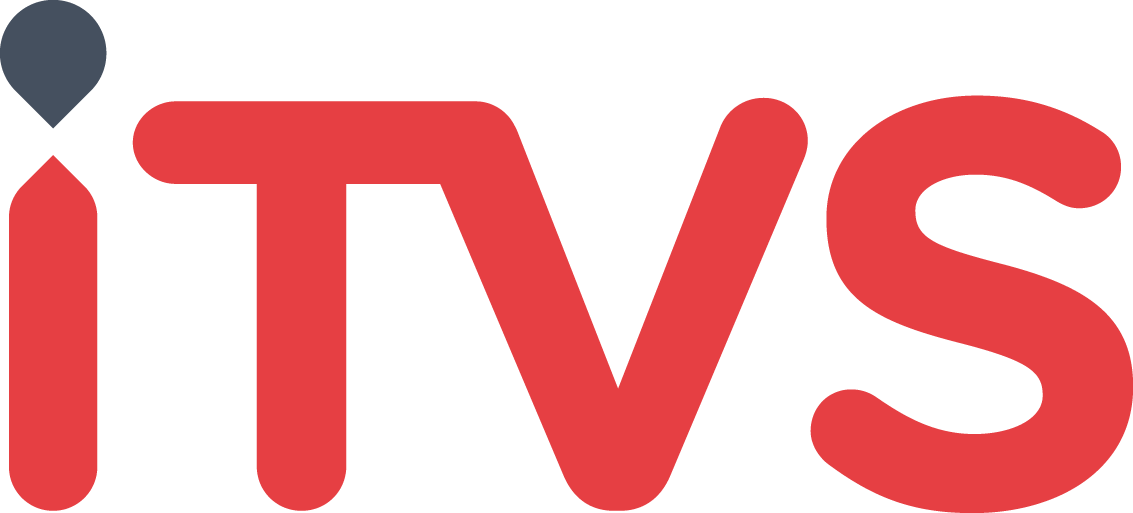
- Type: Private non-profit
- Industry: Television, Film
- Founded: 1991
- Headquarters: San Francisco, California, U.S.
- Area served: United States
- Key people: Lois Vossen, Interim President and CEO
- Number of employees: 42
- Website: www.itvs.org

ITVS (Independent Television Service) is a service in the United States which funds and presents documentaries on public television through distribution by PBS and American Public Television, new media projects on the Internet, and the weekly series Independent Lens on PBS. Aside from Independent Lens, ITVS funded and produced films for more than 40 television hours per year on the PBS series POV, Frontline, American Masters and American Experience. Some ITVS programs are produced along with organizations like Latino Public Broadcasting and KQED.

Besides Independent Lens, ITVS series include Indie Lens Storycast on YouTube and Women of the World with Women and Girls Lead Global. Prior series include Global Voices (on World) and FutureStates.

ITVS was funded by the Corporation for Public Broadcasting (CPB), and is based in San Francisco.

ITVS has funded more than 1,400 films, with an eye on diversity and underrepresented audiences and filmmakers. The organization champions inclusion on the screen and behind the camera: Nearly 70% of ITVS funds go to diverse producers, 50% to women.

In 2024, ITVS, in partnership with American University, NORC at the University of Chicago, and Columbia University, released a ground-breaking study entitled Ethical Responsibility and Impact in Documentary Filmmaking.

== History ==
ITVS was established through legislation by the United States Congress in 1988, "to expand the diversity and innovativeness of programming available to public broadcasting," and began funding new programming via production licensing agreements in 1990. From 2005 to 2010, it expanded its reach through the creation of the Global Perspectives Project, which facilitated the international exchange of documentary films made by independent producers. In 2017, ITVS was named the recipient of a Peabody Institutional Award for its contributions to storytelling in television; the Peabody board of jurors cited "an accomplished range of work as rich as any broadcaster or funder," and in the same year the organization learned it was to receive the 2017 Emmy Governors Award chosen by the Television Academy Board of Governors, awarded during the Creative Arts Emmy Awards ceremony on Saturday, September 9, 2017.

ITVS has discovered and nurtured prominent filmmakers, including one of the first films by Oscar-winning director Barry Jenkins, who made a film. In 2015, ITVS created a new digital journalism initiative

== Notable works ==
Among the prominent films funded by ITVS:

- I Am Not Your Negro (Oscar-nominated film by Raoul Peck)
- Meet the Patels (Ravi and Geeta Patel)
- TOWER (Keith Maitland)
- Newtown (Kim A. Snyder)
- The Force (Pete Nicks)
- Dolores (Peter Bratt)
- Best of Enemies (By Oscar-winner Morgan Neville, Robert Gordon)
- Have You Heard From Johannesburg (Primetime Emmy Award winner by Connie Field)
- A Lion in the House (Primetime Emmy Award winner by Julia Reichert, Steven Bognar)
- Brother to Brother (ITVS-funded drama by Rodney Evans, starring then-unknown Anthony Mackie)
- When Claude Got Shot (Primetime Emmy Award winner by Brad Lichtenstein)
- Philly D.A. (eight-episode series directed by Ted Passon, Yoni Brook, and Nicole Salazar)
- One Child Nation (Nanfu Wang, Jialing Zhang)
- Minding the Gap (Oscar-nominated film by Bing Liu)
- Breaking the News (Heather Courtney, Princess A. Hairston and Chelsea Hernandez)
- My Sweet Land (Sareen Hairabedian)
- The Librarians (Kim A. Snyder)
- Natchez (Suzannah Herbert)
- Who Moves America (Yael Bridge)

== Independent Lens ==
Since 1999, ITVS has produced Independent Lens, a weekly television series airing on PBS presenting documentary films made by independent filmmakers. For the first three seasons Independent Lens aired 10 episodes each fall season. In 2002, PBS announced that in 2003 the series would relaunch and expand to 29 primetime episodes a year.

In 2017, ITVS announced Indie Lens Storycast, a free subscription-based docuseries channel on YouTube, co-produced with PBS Digital Studios. Storycast launched in September of that year with docuseries Iron Maidens and The F Word.

In addition, ITVS produces Indie Lens Pop-Up, formerly Community Cinema, an in-person series that brings people together for film screenings and community-driven conversations, featuring documentaries seen on Independent Lens.

== Awards ==
32 ITVS films have won Peabody Awards, including How to Survive a Plague by David France; Marco Williams and Whitney Dow's Two Towns of Jasper; Leslee Udwin's India's Daughter; and The Invisible War by Kirby Dick and Amy Ziering.

ITVS-Supported Peabody Winners

- Between the Folds
- Bhutto
- Billy Strayhorn: Lush Life
- Brakeless
- Chisholm '72: Unbought & Unbossed
- Coming Out Under Fire
- Craft in America
- Deej
- Dolores
- Don't Tell Anyone (No Le Digas a Nadie)
- Flag Wars
- The Gate of Heavenly Peace
- A Healthy Baby Girl
- The House I Live In
- How to Survive a Plague
- India's Daughter
- The Invisible War
- The Judge
- King Corn
- Latino Americans
- The Lord Is Not on Trial Here Today
- Lorraine Hansberry: Sighted Eyes/Feeling Heart
- Mapping Stem Cell Research: Terra Incognita
- Maya Angelou: And Still I Rise
- Minding the Gap
- The Most Dangerous Man in America: Daniel Ellsberg and the Pentagon Papers
- My Perestroika
- Newtown
- The Order of Myths
- Park Avenue: Money, Power & the American Dream
- Solar Mamas
- Reel Injun
- A Room Nearby
- Sisters in Law
- Still Life with Animated Dogs
- Summer Pasture
- Travis
- Two Towns of Jasper
- Who Killed Chea Vichea?
- Trapped

ITVS-Supported News & Documentary Emmy Winners

- Abacus: Small Enough to Jail
- Forever Pure
- TOWER
- The Armor of Light
- Thank You for Playing
- In Football We Trust
- (T)error
- Best of Enemies
- Promises
- School Prayer: A Community at War
- Billy Strayhorn: Lush Life
- Be Good, Smile Pretty
- The Invisible War
- Last Train Home
- Operation Homecoming: Writing the Wartime Experience
- The Woodmans
- Art & Copy
- The Homestretch
- Medora
- Made in L.A.
- Where Soldiers Come From
- Blink
- A Lion's Trail
- Detropia
- The Trials of Muhammad Ali
- Girls Like Us
- Operation Homecoming: Writing the Wartime Experience
- When I Walk
- The Interrupters
- Nobody's Business
- Outlawed in Pakistan
- The English Surgeon
- Fenceline: A Company Town Divided

ITVS-Supported Primetime Emmy Winners

- Have You Heard From Johannesburg
- A Lion In The House
