= Unite America =

American grassroots organization

- Formation: 2013
- Purpose: To reform the American political system
- Headquarters: Denver, CO
- Founder: Charlie Wheelan
- Affiliations: National Association of Nonpartisan Reformers, Bridge Alliance
- Website: www.uniteamerica.org
- Formerly called: The Centrist Project

Unite America (previously known as the Centrist Project) is an American grassroots organization founded by Charlie Wheelan with the goal of reforming the political system and bridging the partisan divide. Unite America supports both electoral political reforms as well as independent-minded candidates.

Affiliated politicians include former Alaska Governor Bill Walker, former Iowa state senator David Johnson, Greg Orman, and Evan McMullin.

== History ==
Author and educator Charles Wheelan published "The Centrist Manifesto" in 2013, inspired by the failed bipartisan efforts surrounding the Simpson-Bowles Commission in 2011. In the book, he outlines an approach to government in which a "Centrist Party" challenges partisanship by controlling the swing vote and facilitating compromise between Democrats and Republicans. Wheelan worked with business, political, and academic leaders from across the country to form the Centrist Project in 2014, which would eventually become Unite America.

In 2016, Nick Troiano, a former congressional candidate, joined the organization's board as executive director. Troiano pushed the organizations towards supporting structural election reforms, such as nonpartisan redistricting.

In 2017, the Centrist Project opened its national headquarters in Denver, Colorado. The organization then changed its name to Unite America. That same year, an affiliated state-based organization, Washington Independents, launched to support independent candidates in Washington.

In 2018, Unite America and its state-focused local affiliate, Unite Colorado, endorsed independent candidates for the Colorado State Legislature. The organization picked Colorado because of its narrowly divided Legislature and a belief that voters there would be receptive to independent candidates. That same year Unite America also supported a slate of independent national candidates for state gubernatorial offices and the U.S. Senate.

In March 2019, a new statewide chapter, Unite Virginia, launched to support centrist Democratic and Republican candidates.

In September 2019, Unite America announced more than $5 million in commitments through the Unite America Fund to support election reform campaigns in Alaska, Massachusetts, Pennsylvania, and New York. The two largest donors to the fund were Kathryn Murdoch and Marc Merrill. In November 2019, New York City voters approved ranked-choice voting through a City Charter amendment. The change only applied to primary and special elections for mayor, public advocate, comptroller, borough president, and City Council.

== Board of directors ==
Unite America's board of directors includes:

- Charles Wheelan, founder and senior economics lecturer at Dartmouth College
- Neal Simon, former candidate for US Senate
- Kathryn Murdoch, co-founder and president of Quadrivium
- Lisa D. T. Rice, political and external affairs strategist
- Marc Merrill, co-chairman, co-CEO, and co-founder of Riot Games
- Randy Peeler
- Kent Thiry
