= Women and Girls Lead Global =

Women and Girls Lead Global (WGLG) combines documentary film, national television broadcasts, local and new media, and engagement activities to impact audiences and support existing efforts by NGOs, civil society organizations and other actors to provide opportunities for women and girls.

WGLG started when the producers of various Independent Television Stations' series began to align thematically with the plight of women and girls in various countries.

Women and Girls Lead came about when ITVS officials noticed that a number of the films in their pipeline dealt with women’s leadership issues, said Sally Jo Fifer, president and chief executive of ITVS. “When our producers find the pulse together it’s really important to pay attention,” she said.

Each year, they bring transformational stories in the form of documentary film to six million viewers in eight countries and gather 40,000 people in village squares, rural classrooms, and urban slums.

WGLG integrates documentary into a community conversation.

In 2014, the US Department of State shared the details of a U.S.-India Cooperation on Promoting Women’s Empowerment highlighting the involvement of one of the 9 countries. Overall the initiative, WGLG is supporting the preventing and responding to gender-based violence.

In India the focus of the partnership is public outreach and awareness programs. Global public-private partnerships with USAID, such as the Women and Girls Lead Global Project and the Girl Rising Global Partnership, uses innovative multimedia and film campaigns to promote girls’ education and engage men and boys to address root causes of GBV.

The WGLG community-driven social change initiative drives action that reduces child marriage, lowers gender-based violence, recruits women leaders, and prevents teen pregnancy. In 2015 WGLG collaborated with local communities in Peru, Jordan, Bangladesh, India and Kenya.
