= Kathryn Murdoch =

American philanthropist

Kathryn Hufschmid Murdoch is an American philanthropist whose donations center on democracy reform and pressing global issues. She is known for her marriage to James Murdoch, the younger son of the media mogul, Rupert Murdoch, with whom she founded and runs the Quadrivium Foundation.

== Career ==
Kathryn Hufschmid Murdoch first worked in marketing and public relations, based in New York City and Hong Kong. She worked for Gear men's magazine and for Louis Vuitton. After leaving this role, she co-founded the Thakoon brand of clothing and accessories, with Thai American designer Thakoon Panichgul, which she sold in 2015.

She was an executive director for the Clinton Climate Initiative from 2006 until 2011, and then until 2012 was a visiting fellow at Oxford University. At Oxford, in the position of where as director of ReSource 2012, she "convened scientists, academics, investment professionals and entrepreneurs, to promote the judicious use of natural resources".

== Philanthropy and activism ==
Murdoch's donations center on democracy reform, and among them is a $1 million contribution to The 19th, a news organization founded to increase awareness of issues related to fulfilling the Nineteenth Amendment to the United States Constitution.

She embraces "protopia", a word coined by Wired co-founder Kevin Kelly, meaning "a state that is better today than yesterday".

=== Quadrivium ===
In 2014, she and her husband formed the Quadrivium Foundation, which supports "initiatives that address the root causes of problems and where single actions can create multiple positive outcomes". It is focused on five key areas: democracy, technology and society, scientific understanding, climate change, and the health of the world's oceans. It invests in evidence-based solutions to problems. In 2019, after the Murdoch family's sale of the entertainment part of 21st Century Fox to Disney, his job as CEO going with it, James Murdoch left the family business completely. He put $US100 million of his share of the proceeds of the sale into Quadrivium.

One of Murdoch's aims is to increase voter participation. In 2019, under the auspices of Quadrivium, she established a program focused on "finding and achieving solutions to identified problems in our democratic process", including structural changes and voter participation.

In an FT Magazine profile in the weekend edition of the Financial Times, Murdoch's goal has been summarized as "reforming and moderating US politics."

== Other activities ==
Murdoch has been on the advisory board of the Meta-Research Innovation Center at Stanford University and the board of trustees at Rockefeller University. She is a founding board member of SciLine, and is on the boards of Unite America, the Climate Leadership Council, and Climate Central.

In 2023 she co-founded, with futurist Ari Wallach, a production studio called Futurific Studios, intended to be a place for creatives to work on ideas relating to "protopia". The first project by the studio is a six-part PBS documentary series called A Brief History of the Future, which aired in 2024. It was produced in collaboration with Canadian musician Drake's DreamCrew, and philanthropist Wendy Schmidt.

== Personal life ==
She is married to James Murdoch, the younger son of media mogul Rupert Murdoch. They have three children, Anneka, Walter, and Emerson, and as of 2024 the family live in New York City.
