= Pan African Climate Justice Alliance =

Network of climate organizations

- Founders: Augustine B Njamnshi and Mithika Mwenda
- Headquarters: Nairobi, Kenya
- Website: pacja.org

Pan African Climate Justice Alliance (PACJA) is a network of more than 1000 organisations from 48 countries in Africa. It is a coalition of civil society organisations (CSOs) established in 2008 It is based in Kenya and consists of NGOs, grassroots organisations, trusts, foundations, indigenous communities, farmers, community-based organisations, and religious organisations. It advocates for climate and environmental justice and it is a people-centred consortium. It was co-founded by climate activists Augustine B Njamnshi and Mithika Mwenda.

Main areas of focus are: climate justice, environmental justice, sustainable development, community empowerment, policy influence, research and development, education.

== Objectives ==
The PACJA wants to promote poverty reduction and develop positions based on equity, which are relevant for Africa in international climate change politics. The network wants a global environment without the threats of climate change and advocates for a development process based on equity and justice for all human beings. The goal of the network is to be an African platform for civil society organisations to make information available, to find strategies, to engage with African governments and other important stakeholders, and to stand for justice and fairness in the international climate change dialogue. It aims at creating sustainable development processes in order to protect both the climate, the human rights, and the pro-poor growth.

== Activities ==
In 2017, the PACJA created a petition to stop France and the EU from interfering in the African Renewable Energy Initiative (AREI). The AREI unit is based at the African Development Bank (AfDB) headquarters in Abidjan. Organisations from across dozens of countries supported the petition, including groups such as Greenpeace Mauritius, Somali Climate Change Network, Human Rights and Legal Aid Network of Sudan, Journalists for Climate Change in Nigeria, and Young Volunteers for Environment Zambia. These groups were worried about the EU and France interfering with investment plans in developing renewable energy in Africa.

The PACJA created the ACCER Awards in 2013 to reward and sustain excellence in environmental journalism.

On August 21, 2021, PACJA started the Nairobi Summer School on Climate Justice at Kenyatta University. 700 people participated in the pilot program.

In 2016, PACJA founded the Africa Coalition on Sustainable Energy (ACSEA), a multi-organizational alliance, to advocate for decentralised, low-carbon energy.

In September 2021 lasting until September 2024, PACJA launched the GUARD Africa project, a post-COVID-19 reconstruction project that focuses on "low-carbon, climate resilient, just, and inclusive development." The program cost 50 million Swedish Krona, or $5.1 million.

In 2022, PACJA launched the Africa Green Climate Finance National Designated Authorities Network (AFDAN). The goal of the program is to increase access to climate finance so that African countries may adapt to climate change. African countries with climate legislation in place receive $1.3 million per year.

In 2023, PACJA started the African Activists for Climate Justice project (AACJ). The purpose of the project is to advocate for particularly climate vulnerable groups - women, children, and indigenous communities - to live in a "healthy and sustainable environment within the context of a climate emergency." The 5-year project is funded by the Dutch Ministry of Foreign Affairs, and is implemented in Burkina Faso, Ethiopia, Kenya, Nigeria, Mozambique, Senegal, Somalia, and South Africa.

In June 2023, PACJA and the Pan-African Parliament co-organised the third African Parliamentarians' Climate Policy and Equity Summit. At the meeting, PACJA Executive Director Mithika Mwenda summarised the three dimensions of climate justice: distributive justice, retributive justice and procedural justice. Emphasised the importance of equality and justice in the climate change agenda.

== Influence ==
Adhering to the principle of environmental justice, PACJA calls on African organizations and the international community to unwaveringly and correctly implement the Paris Agreement and continue to contribute to the 2030 Agenda. At the same time, the organization also advocates that governments take responsibility for actively promoting the development of environmental justice and social justice. Through partnerships, policy advocacy, and publicity activities, the necessity and urgency of climate action are emphasised. PACJA conveyed African countries' development expectations for climate change at high-level international summits such as COP28 and COP29, and proposed to solve the climate problems facing Africa through financial and technical assistance.

PACJA actively participated in climate negotiations in Africa and the world and played a core role in helping Africa move towards fair climate and environmental policies.
