= MATCH International Women's Fund =

- Founder: Dr. Norma E. Walmsley & Ms. Suzanne Johnson-Harvor
- Type: Non-governmental organization (NGO)
- Legal status: International Fund
- Purpose: Humanitarian Aid, Activism
- Headquarters: Ottawa, Canada
- Region served: Global South
- CEO: Jess Tomlin
- Website: matchinternational.org
- Formerly called: MATCH

MATCH International Women's Fund is a non-profit organization founded in 1976 with the intent to improve lives of women. It is based in Ottawa, Canada. Since then, MATCH International has helped women's rights organizations from numerous countries with investments totaling $12 million for improvement of women and girls' rights. In 2013, the organization re-launched under the name MATCH International Women's Fund with the same aim to invest in women and girls in the global South. As the only international women's fund in Canada, their motto is, "Holding Ground and Breaking Ground" on women's, girls', and transgender rights. The organization's funding comes from individual donors, corporate partners, and the government of Canada.

== History ==
Before 2013, the MATCH International Women's Fund was called the MATCH Fund. It was launched in 1976 by Dr. Norma E. Walmsley and Ms. Suzanne Johnson-Harvor with objectives of supporting women's movements worldwide.

After attending the 1975 UN Conference for Women in Mexico City, they were inspired to create an organization that supports grassroots women's organizations in the global South. The MATCH Fund was the first organization of its kind that 'matched' the needs of Canadian women with similar needs in the global South, and was also the first international nongovernmental organization that focused on women in the global south.

In 2010, the fund almost closed due to budget cuts from the Canadian International Development Agency, but remained open. After reevaluating its role in the area of women's rights and development work, the fund refocused on supporting grassroots women's movements in developing countries.

In 2011, with funding from private donors and the World University Service of Canada, the fund rebranded as Canada's first international women's fund to focus on social innovation. In 2013, the fund relaunched as MATCH International Women's Fund, claiming to be the first and only Canadian fund focused on women. The rebranding was supported by corporate brand developers and public relations and advertisement firms.

The MATCH International Women's Fund has partnered with 71 countries and more than 650 organizations since its founding.

=== Structure ===
The fund's president and CEO, Jess Tomlin, joined the organization in 2012. Other executive roles are Vice President of Finance and Operations, Vice President of Capital Development, and Vice President of Global Programs. Other key positions are Finance Office, Senior Communication Strategist, Financial Analyst, Executive Coordinator, Development Assistant, Manager Global Programs, and Policy Lead.

The fund has a board of directors composed of a chair, vice-chair, secretary, treasurer, and nine directors. There is also an advisory council with fifteen members who have expertise in areas such as women's rights, leadership, media, innovation, entrepreneurship, and peace and security.

=== Funding ===
As a non-profit, non-governmental entity, the organization obtains its funding from private individual Canadian donors, other Canadian organizations and foundations, and the Federal government of Canada. The money from their funding is then granted to other women's organizations. Their finances were published in the 2016-2017 Strength in Numbers Report.

==== Individual donors ====
The MATCH International Women's Fund's funding comes from individual Canadian donors, with one year bringing in $2 million from private donors.

==== Private sector ====
The MATCH International Women's Fund has corporate partners including Cairns O'Neil Strategic Media, Citizen Relations, The Colony Project, and Fish Out of Water Design Inc., Eastern Ontario Women in Finance, and Telus Corporation.

==== Foundations ====
The MATCH International Women's Fund also has donor foundations including Foundations Canadian Federation of University Women, Elementary Teachers' Federation of Ontario, Foundation for a Just Society, Institute for International Women's Rights - Manitoba, LesLois Shaw Foundation, McLean Smits Foundation, Sisters of St. Joseph of the Diocese of London Foundation, Terrace Women and Development Collective, The Red Butterfly Foundation, The Cloverleaf Foundation, University of Winnipeg Foundation, Wellspring Advisors, Women's Executive Network Foundation.

==== Canadian government ====
The MATCH International Women's Fund, as well as other women's organizations like the Nobel Women's Initiative, have been pressuring the Canadian federal government to fund international grassroots organizations for women's advancement. In 2017, the Trudeau government announced a new feminist international development policy as part for the Canadian foreign aid program that would find new ways to reach smaller organizations and groups while being accountable to the taxpayers. Both organizations advocated for these small amounts to grassroots organizations to be passed through their non-profit organizations.

=== Mission ===
The MATCH International Women's Fund's motto is "Holding Ground and Breaking Ground". This is linked to their mission that is the support small grassroots women's organizations that are holding ground and breaking ground in their respective country. By changing societal beliefs, opening barriers and systems through funding of other organizations, MATCH International Fund's mission is to improve women, girls, and transgender rights.

President and CEO, Jess Tomlin, explains "Our mandate is to get money into the hands of women's organizations who are really working at the community level, and we're particularly curious about investing in disruptive and innovative organizations".

=== Values ===
The non-governmental organization's (NGO) values include courage, ambition, tenacity, feminism, innovation, agility, lasting change, and collaboration, with the ultimate goal to put a stop to discrimination and violence against women and girls.

== Activities ==
The main activities of MATCH International Women's Fund includes the funding of grassroots organizations worldwide, sharing the stories of these organizations and the women behind them. By funding grassroots organizations and sharing their stories, MATCH International Women's Fund brings change in more than 25 countries.

=== Grants ===
The MATCH International Women's Fund's main activity is to support grassroots women's organisations in developing countries through the giving of grants. These capacity building grants are given to small organizations that work towards systematic change through collaboration and innovation, or through services and programs that promote and sustain women's rights. These grants range between 10,000 CAD to 20,000 CAD and proposals for grant demands are open once a year.

These grants to grassroots organizations allow for flexible funding as the partners directly communicate with the fund's staff for their needs. The MATCH Fund's responsive funding to these grassroots organizations allows for new innovative ideas and resistance. The fund also seeks to magnify the voices of their partners by sharing their stories, promoting their work, connecting to opportunities, and support.

=== Campaigns ===
The MATCH International Women's Fund most prominent advocacy campaign is the #NoWomanFairytale, which is focused on three important topics: child marriage, rape and female genital mutilation. By funding and partnering with different grass-root women organizations worldwide, the MATCH Fund want to alleviate these controversial practices. Each story ends with "And, little by little, the harmful practice of child marriage/rape/female genital mutilation came to an end", thanks to the work of women in grass-root organizations, which MATCH funds.

On the fund's website, MATCH has created a "how many laws did you break today?" quiz that brings awareness to the socio-cultural differences between Canadian women and women in the Global South. By asking regular, banal questions such as "When you left your house today, did you tell a man where you're going?" or "What did you wear to work today?" in order to show that in other parts of the world, fundamental human rights are denied. The quiz ends with a number of laws that the respondent would have broke in a country of the global south, along with the penalties of breaking those laws such as imprisonment, lashes, electric shocks, arbitrary arrests, death threats, harassment, and death. The quiz ends with MATCH asking for the respondent to pay their fine (i.e. a donation).

Their #LotteryOfLife quiz, launched in 2016, aims to increase awareness of the lives of women and girls in the global south. From basic personal information (age, education, gender, etc.), the quiz tells users where they would be in the developing world.

Another digital quiz found on the fund's website titled "Why Are We Still Protesting This Sh*!?" (launched in 2017) questions one's knowledge on past and present women's marches and protests through pictures. At the end of the quiz, the fact that women have been fighting and activating for rights for decades is paralleled by women in the developing world this fighting for rights and against culturally adopted practices.

These three quizzes above are part of MATCH's campaign for awareness have been taken by more than 550,000 people since their launches.

A 2018 initiative can be found on the organization's website, it is titled Resting Stitch Face. This is another initiative to increase awareness of the issues, in this case sexism, that women face. Here, cross-stitch is used to write sexist sayings; once the saying is chosen, backgrounds and colours to personalize the saying are picked. Users are encouraged to download or share their personal cross-stitches.

=== Social innovation ===
It was, President and CEO, Jess Tomlin that became interested in social innovation and the advantages it could bring to women's rights issues. The fact that MATCH is innovative makes it the "first social innovation fund for women globally". Instead of funding infrastructure and large organizations, the MATCH International Women's Fund believe that smaller grassroots women's organizations and their initiatives will bring about more meaningful change. As Muhungi and Edwards claim, the MATCH International Women's Fund is an innovation in itself as the first international fund focused on women in Canada.

The non-governmental organization works with 25 organizations across the world by funding a variety of projects such as an organization that work with survivors of sexual violence in Mexico, an organization that creates LGBT documentaries in Georgia, an organization that created an app to help Rwandan women during pregnancy, or even women-led tourist initiatives. Other innovative solution for women issues is Kenya's Boxgirls, an organization that trains girls in rural areas as a way to empower them. In India, Nidhi Goyal is a blind stand-up comedian that encourages equality and acceptance through her comedy, the MATCH International Women's Fund supported Nidhi in the creation of an application that connected disabled women to volunteer caregivers.

== Membership ==
=== Win-Win Coalition & Win-Win Strategies ===
The MATCH International Women's Fund is also a founding member of the Win-Win Coalition, which advocates and supports for the empowerment and advancement of women by adding resources and by cross-sector collaboration. The Win-Win Strategies partners with the assets of funds and organizations to empower women globally through business. By using the knowledge and resources of funds and organizations with their own services of business building, such as connections, consultations, development, and building sectors.

=== Women's Funding Network ===
The MATCH International Women's Fund is a member of the Women's Funding Network (WFN), which is an international alliance made up of 145 women's funds.

== Partners ==
The MATCH International Women's Fund as a total of 25 partners as of early 2018. These are the partners that are receiving grants and funds by the International Fund for 2016–2017.

=== Africa ===
- Akili Dada (Kenya)
- Akina Mama wa Afrika (Uganda and The Great Lakes Region)
- Association BIOWA (Benin)
- Boxgirls Kenya (Kenya)
- Fem Alliance (FEMA) (Uganda)
- Fonds pour les femmes Congolaises (Democratic Republic of Congo)
- Law and Advocacy for Women (LAW) (Uganda)
- Mama Radio (Democratic Republic of Congo)
- Rape Crisis Cape Town Trust (South Africa)
- Resource Center for Women and Girls (Kenya)
- Tshwaranang Legal Advocacy Centre (TLAC) (South Africa)

=== South America ===
- Asociación de mujeres migrantes y refugiadas (AMUMRA) (Argentina)
- Asociación Oxlajuj B'atz'-Trece Hilos (Guatemala)

=== Central America ===
- Asociación de Mujeres Las Golondrinas (Nicaragua)
- Asociacion de Victimas Por La Paz y el Desarrollo (Colombia)
- Corporación Vamos Mujer (Colombia)
- Equifonía, Colectivo por la Ciudadanía, Autonomía y Libertad de las Mujeres AC (Mexico)

=== Southern Asia ===
- Feminist Approach to Technology (FAT) (India)
- Her Turn (Nepal)
- Resolve T2C (India)
- The Nidhi Initiative: Point of View (India)
- Urgent Action Fund (Afghanistan, India, and Pakistan)
- Women Awareness Centre Nepal (Nepal)

=== Western Asia ===
- StudioMobile – Accent on Action (Georgia)

=== Caribbean ===
- WMW Jamaica (Jamaica)

== Recognition ==
In 2017, the MATCH International Women's Fund won a Communications Management award by the International Association of Business Communicators and in 2015 won an award on innovation by the Canadian Council on International Co-operation. In the same year, the MATCH International Fund's president and CEO, Jess Tomlin, was awarded the Gold Stevie award for "Most Innovative Woman of the Year - Government or Non-Profit".

=== Accreditation ===
In 2016, MATCH International Women's Fund became accredited by Imagine Canada, a non-governmental organization that focuses on charitable Canadian organization and helps make them trusted and standardized in five key areas of affairs (governance, accountability & transparency, fundraising, management, and volunteer work).

== See also ==
- Akina Mama wa Afrika
- Misogyny
- List of women's rights activists
- List of women's organizations
- National Council of Women of Canada
- Pregnant patients' rights
- Sex workers' rights
- Timeline of women's legal rights (other than voting)
- Timeline of women's suffrage
- Women's Social and Political Union
