= The 19th =

American news organization

- Named after: Nineteenth Amendment to the United States Constitution
- Established: January 27, 2020 (6 years ago)
- Types: website, corporation, nonprofit organization
- Legal status: 501(c)(3) organization
- Headquarters: Austin
- Country: United States
- Revenue: 10,881,924 United States dollar (2020)
- Total Assets: 12,683,001 United States dollar (2020)
- Website: www.19thnews.org

The 19th, sometimes stylized The 19th*, is a nonprofit and independent news organization based in Austin, Texas. It was founded in 2020 by CEO Emily Ramshaw and publisher Amanda Zamora, both former Texas Tribune staffers who served as editor-in-chief and chief audience officer, respectively.

== History ==
The organization is named after the Nineteenth Amendment to the United States Constitution, which gave women the right to vote, reflecting its mission "to empower women—particularly those underserved by and underrepresented in American media—with the information, community, and tools they need to be equal participants in our democracy." Ramshaw said its coverage would initially be "presidential politics, women and Congress, the women's electorate, women's health, women and the economy, and women and the states". The asterisk used in the stylized name is intended to indicate the organization's view that the Nineteenth Amendment is "unfinished business" as, in practice, the passing of the amendment mainly benefited white women.

Other executives include Errin Haines, editor-at-large, and former national writer on race for the Associated Press, and Julia B. Chan, editor-in-chief, previously at KQED, Mother Jones, and Reveal from the Center for Investigative Reporting.

While it was building its staff in early 2020, the news organization had a content sharing agreement with The Washington Post. Starting April 22, it had planned to kick off a national tour of Austin, Atlanta, Denver, Los Angeles, Minneapolis, and Seattle in order to help shape its coverage, but this tour was later cancelled due to the COVID-19 pandemic. The site launched officially on August 2, 2020.

The venture started with close to $5 million in pledged support. Among the funders to the site are Craig Newmark (500,000); Kathryn Murdoch ($1 million); Rockefeller Philanthropy Advisors' Reproductive Health and Women's Rights Collaborative ($1 million); and various amounts from the Ford Foundation, Emerson Collective, the Knight Foundation, Abigail Disney, Arnold Ventures, and the Packard Foundation. As of March 2021, newsroom leaders said the venture had raised $12 million.

== See also ==
- Institute for Nonprofit News
