= Morning report =

Morning report may refer to:

- Morning report (medicine), a daily meeting of hospital doctors
- Morning report (United States military), a daily list of personnel not presented and accounted for
- Morning Report, a radio programme on RNZ National in New Zealand
- "The Morning Report", a song in the musical The Lion King
- Morning Report, an album by Canadian artist Arkells

== See also ==
- Marketplace Morning Report, an American radio program
