= Brammer v. Derwinski =

American court case

Brammer vs. Derwinski
- Court: United States Court of Appeals for Veterans Claims
- Decided: September 3, 1992
- Citation: 3 Vet. App. 223 (1992)

Case history
- Appealed from: Board of Veterans Appeals

Court membership
- Judges sitting: Kramer (Associate Judge), Mankin (Associate Judge), Holloway (Associate Judge)

Brammer vs. Derwinski is a United States Court of Appeals for Veterans Claims case that dealt with the requirement for a current diagnosis as a general element for service connection.

== Background ==
James W. Brammer appealed a September 13, 1990, Board of Veterans' Appeals (BVA) decision which denied reopening his claim for service connection for spinal meningitis. BVA also determined that the Veteran was not entitled to service connection for residuals of frozen feet. Mr. Brammer was a combat Veteran of World War II and served in Normandy, Northern France, the Ardennes, the Rhineland, and Central Europe. He originally filed a claim for spinal meningitis in 1980 and was denied by the VA Regional Office (VARO). The VARO noted that the Veteran's records were destroyed in the 1973 National Personnel Records Center fire. A United States military morning report was obtained that showed that the Veteran was in fact hospitalized, but no diagnosis was given. Affidavits from four separate service members, written in the fall of 1980, attested that the Veteran was in fact treated for spinal meningitis. The VARO determined that the affidavits were not sufficient to justify a grant of service connection for spinal meningitis. Afterwards, the Veteran attempted to reopen his claim on numerous occasions, including the last denial on October 19, 1988, in which the VARO denied service connection for spinal meningitis. He appealed this decision to BVA, which held that there was no "new and material" evidence of record that would reopen the previous denial.

== Analysis ==
The Court noted that no evidence had been presented since the last adjudication on the claim. The Court noted that in all the evidence provided, there was no evidence showing that there was a current disability. All the evidence in favor of the Veteran only attempted to establish that he was treated for spinal meningitis at one time. Since there was no evidence of a current disability, the Court affirmed the BVA decision.

== Decision ==
The Court affirmed BVA's decision that there was no new and material evidence to reopen the claim.
