= Nieves-Rodriguez v. Peake =

Significant Court of Appeals for Veterans Claim opinion

Nieves-Rodriguez vs. Peake
- Court: United States Court of Appeals for Veterans Claims
- Decided: December 1, 2008
- Citation: 22 Vet. App. 295 (2008)

Case history
- Appealed from: Board of Veterans Appeals

Court membership
- Judges sitting: Hagel, Davis, and Schoelen

Nieves-Rodriguez vs. Peake is a United States Court of Appeals for Veterans Claims case that dealt with the adequacy and weighing of medical opinions.

== Background ==
Angel Nieves-Rodriguez served in the U.S. Army from November 1954 to October 1956. While in the service, he was treated for Guillain-Barre Syndrome. In February 1957, the Veterans Benefits Administration granted service connection and associated disability benefits for this condition.

In 1970, Nieves-Rodriguez developed psychological problems and claimed service connection for them. The Veterans Benefits Administration (VBA) denied service connection, based on a report from a VA examiner that diagnosed an anxiety reaction but did not discuss the etiology of the condition.

In 1995 Nieves-Rodriguez was diagnosed with major depression. He filed another disability claim for major depression, as a direct service connected illness, (Note: A "direct" service connection means that the injury or disease was incurred in or the result of military service.) In 1998, VBA denied service connection on both counts. Nieves-Rodriguez then appealed the decision to the Board of Veterans Appeals.

Nieves-Rodriguez obtained private medical opinions from two physicians in support of his claim. One doctor submitted a letter stating that he had treated the Veteran since 1995 and opined that his major depression was secondary to the service connected Guillain–Barré syndrome. A second doctor provided an opinion with the same conclusion. This second doctor had the opportunity to review the Veteran's claims folder, but later admitted during a hearing that he had not reviewed the Veteran's medical records that pertained to neurology treatment.

Nieves-Rodriguez reported for VA examinations in 2000 and 2004. He met with the same VA examiner on both occasions. The examiner reviewed the entire claims folder and noted that previous VA neurological evaluations indicated that the Veteran exhibited "very little and very mild consequences" as a result of the Guillain–Barré Syndrome. The examiner opined on both occasions that the claimant's major depressive disorder was not caused by Guillain–Barré Syndrome.

The Board placed more probative value on the VA examiner's opinion, reasoning that the private doctors did not conduct an in-depth review of the claims folder, thereby reducing the probative weight of their opinions.

== Analysis ==
The Court started out by rejecting the assumption that a private medical opinion not based on a complete review of the claims folder is always less sufficient than an opinion based on a complete review of the records. The Court supported this statement by noting that "[b]oth VA medical examiners and private physicians offering medical opinions in veterans benefits cases are nothing more or less than expert witnesses".

The Court, while pointing out that the Board of Veterans Appeals is not bound by the Federal Rules of Evidence, noted that the rules on expert witness testimony are useful in determining probative value as it pertains to medical opinions.

Specifically, the Court laid out this framework, from the Federal Rules of Evidence, as a guide:

1. The testimony is based on sufficient facts or data,
2. The testimony is the product of reliable principles and methods, and
3. The expert witness has applied the principles and methods reliably to the facts of the case.

The Court then applied this framework to the medical opinions provided by the doctors. The Court held that a claims file review is not a mandatory requirement for private medical opinions, reasoning that the expert witness could nevertheless be informed of the sufficient facts or data, e.g., because the doctor had been treating the veteran for the illness in question.

In applying this framework to the present case, the Court accepted the fact that the Board discounted the opinion provided by the second doctor, as the doctor had overlooked key information in the claims folder. However, the Court stated that the Board had not provided sufficient reasons and bases to explain why it had discounted the first doctor's medical opinion, noting that the Board discounted the doctor's opinion merely because the doctor did not state that he or she had reviewed the claims folder.

== Decision ==
The Court vacated the BVA decision and remanded the case back to the Board of Veterans Appeals for readjudication consistent with the Court's opinion.

== See also ==
- Veterans benefits for post-traumatic stress disorder in the United States: Federal court review
