= Sanchez-Benitez v. West =

Sanchez-Benitez vs. West
- Court: United States Court of Appeals for Veterans Claims
- Decided: December 29, 1999
- Citation: 13 Vet. App. 282 (1999)

Case history
- Appealed from: Board of Veterans' Appeals

Sanchez-Benitez vs. West is a United States Court of Appeals for Veterans Claims case that dealt with the general requirement of a formal diagnosis for service connection.

== Background ==
In this case, the Veteran claimed service connection for a neck disability. Service medical records showed the Veteran sought, on one occasion, medical treatment for neck pain of two months duration with no history of trauma. A post-service VA examination report showed a diagnosis of "[h]istory of trauma with continuing pain in cervical spine." A 1996 examination report showed "[t]he physical findings and the radiologic findings do not reveal a definite or specific cause of the complaints in the neck and low back." The examiner was "not able to correlate well the complaint of chronic pain with the clinical findings."

The Board of Veterans' Appeals (BVA) determined that the preponderance of the evidence was against service connection for a neck disability and affirmed the denial.

== Analysis ==
The Court determined that the Board did not err in its decision. The Court noted that the in-service diagnosis was "pain" and that the current diagnosis was "pain" as well. Pointing to 38 U.S.C. §1110, the Court noted that service connection is awarded for "disability resulting from personal injury suffered or disease contracted in [the] line of duty." The Court noted that pain often warrants separate and even additional consideration when rating an already service connected disability. However, the Court stated that for general purposes of service connection that pain alone, without a diagnosed or identifiable underlying malady or condition, does not in and of itself constitute a disability for which service connection can be granted.

== Decision ==
The Court affirmed the BVA decision.
