= Esteban v. Brown =

Esteban vs. Brown
- Court: United States Court of Appeals for Veterans Claims
- Decided: February 25, 1994
- Citation: 6 Vet. App. 259 (1994)

Case history
- Appealed from: Board of Veterans Appeals

Court membership
- Judges sitting: Kramer, Mankin, and Steinberg

Esteban vs. Brown is a United States Court of Appeals for Veterans Claims case that dealt with the pyramiding rule.

== Background ==
Leonardo Esteban appealed a Board of Veterans' Appeals (BVA) decision that denied entitlement to an increased rating for residuals of an injury to the right side of the face. Mr. Esteban served on active duty between July 1946 and April 1949. In January 1949, he injured his face during a motor vehicle accident in Japan.

In 1977, he attended a VA examination. The examination noted that there were four scars on the right side of his face. The report also detailed that there was an injury to the facial muscles and that he was experiencing pain in the area. The Veteran was ultimately granted service connection under diagnostic code 7800 at 10% disabling.

In 1988, while in the process of filing a claim for an increased evaluation, the Veteran provided medical evidence that he had paralysis on the right side of his face. BVA denied this claim for an increased evaluation. In June 1991, he filed again and provided medical evidence showing that he had impaired sensation on the side of his face and disfiguring scars. The report also showed that he had difficult with mastication and pain. The VA Regional Office denied a higher evaluation. The Board affirmed this decision, but conceded that the Veteran could be rated under diagnostic codes 7800, 7804 or 5325. However, the Board held that the Veteran was not entitled to multiple evaluations for the same disability. Therefore, the 10% disability was confirmed.

== Analysis ==
The Court rejected the argument by the Board. The Court noted that the rating criteria under diagnostic code 7800 was entirely cosmetic in nature, while the rating criteria under 7804 dealt only with the pain associated with the scarring itself. Additionally, diagnostic code 5325 only dealt with facial muscle damage resulting in difficulty with mastication. Therefore, his symptomatology was distinct and separate, thereby not in violation of 38. C.F.R. §4.14. For these reasons, the Court held that the Veteran was entitled to separate evaluations under all three diagnostic codes, as none of the symptomatology for any one of the three conditions were duplicative or overlapping of the other two conditions.

== Decision ==
The appellant's motion was granted, the BVA decision reversed, and the case was remanded.
