= Childhood leukemia =

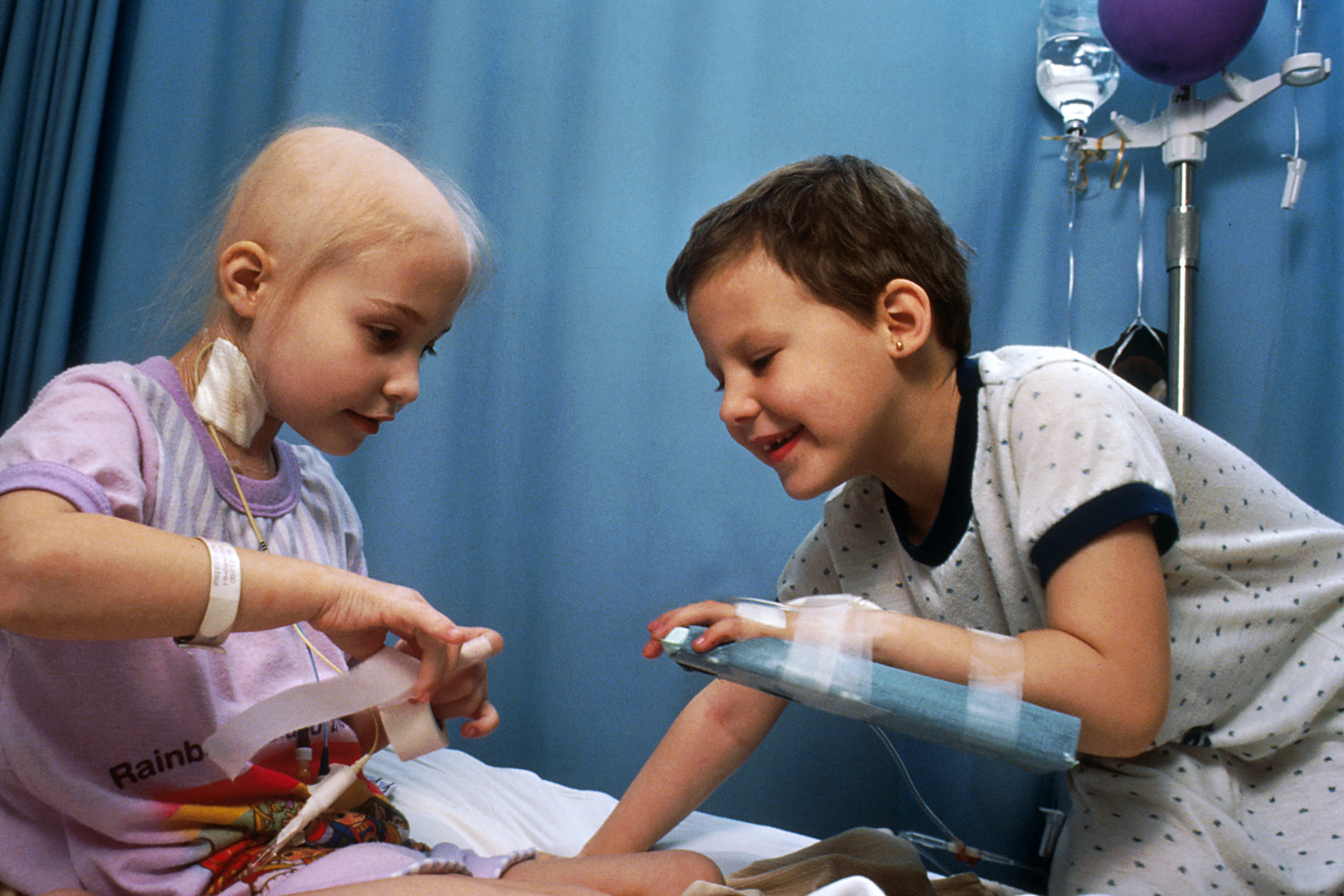
- Two girls with acute lymphocytic leukemia demonstrating intravenous access for chemotherapy.

Childhood leukemia is leukemia that occurs in a child and is a type of childhood cancer. Childhood leukemia is the most common childhood cancer, accounting for 29% of cancers in children aged 0–14 in 2018. There are multiple forms of leukemia that occur in children, the most common being acute lymphoblastic leukemia (ALL) followed by acute myeloid leukemia (AML). Survival rates vary depending on the type of leukemia, but may be as high as 90% in ALL.

Leukemia is a hematological malignancy or a cancer of the blood. It develops in the bone marrow, the soft inner part of bones where new blood cells are made. When a child has leukemia, the bone marrow produces white blood cells that do not mature correctly. Normal healthy cells only reproduce when there is enough space for them. The body will regulate the production of cells by sending signals of when to stop production. When a child has leukemia, the cells do not respond to the signals telling them when to stop and when to produce cells. The bone marrow becomes crowded, resulting in problems producing other blood cells.

Common childhood leukemia signs and symptoms include excessive tiredness, easy bruising or bleeding, bone pain and paleness.

== Types ==
Leukemia is usually described either as "acute", which grows quickly, or "chronic", which grows slowly. The vast majority of childhood leukemia is acute, and chronic leukemias are more common in adults than in children. Acute leukemias typically develop and worsen quickly (over periods of days to weeks). Chronic leukemias develop over a slower period of time (months), but are more difficult to treat than acute leukemias. The following are some of the main types of leukemia that occur in children.

=== Acute lymphoblastic ===
The most common form childhood leukemia is acute lymphocytic (or lymphoblastic) leukemia (ALL), which makes up 75-80% of childhood leukemia diagnoses. Age-specific incidence peaks in children aged 1–4 years and then declines sharply throughout later childhood (5–14 years), adolescence, and young adulthood (15–39 years) ALL is a form of leukemia that affects lymphocytes, a type of white blood cells which fights infection. When a patient has ALL, the bone marrow makes too many immature white blood cells and they do not mature correctly. These white blood cells also do not work correctly to fight infection. The white blood cells overproduce, crowding the other blood cells in the bone marrow. The prognosis for childhood acute lymphoblastic leukemia is good, with a five-year survival rate exceeding 90%

=== Acute myelogenous ===
Another type of acute leukemia is acute myelogenous leukemia (AML). AML accounts for most of the remaining cases of leukemia in children, comprising about 20% of childhood leukemia. AML is cancer of the blood in which too many myeloblasts (immature white blood cells) are produced in the bone marrow. The marrow continues to produce abnormal cells that crowd the other blood cells and do not work properly to fight infection.

=== Acute promyelocytic ===
Acute promyelocytic leukemia (APL) is a specific type of AML. In this leukemia promyelocytes are produced and build up in the bone marrow. A specific chromosome translocation (a type of genetic change) is found in patients with APL. Genes on chromosome 15 change places with genes on chromosome 17. This genetic change prevents the promyelocytes from maturing properly.

=== Chronic myelogenous ===
Chronic myelogenous leukemia (CML) is a chronic leukemia that develops slowly, over months to years. CML is rare in children, but does occur. CML patients have too many immature white blood cells being produced, and the cells crowd the other healthy blood cells. A chromosome translocation occurs in patients with CML. Part of chromosome 9 breaks off and attaches itself to chromosome 22, facilitating exchange of genetic material between chromosomes 9 and 22. The rearrangement of the chromosomes changes the positions and functions of certain genes, which causes uncontrolled cell growth.

Chronic lymphocytic leukemia (CLL) is another form of chronic leukemia, but is extremely rare in children.

=== Juvenile myelomonocytic ===
Juvenile myelomonocytic leukemia (JMML) is a form of leukemia in which myelomonocytic cells are overproduced. It is sometimes considered a myeloproliferative neoplasm. It is rare and most commonly occurs in children under the age of four. In JMML, the myelomonocytic cells produced by the bone marrow and invade the spleen, lungs, and intestines.

== Signs and symptoms ==
Most initial symptoms of leukemia are related to problems with the bone-marrow function. There are a variety of symptoms that children may experience. The symptoms tend to appear quickly in acute leukemia and slowly over time in chronic leukemia. Symptoms in the different types of childhood leukemia include:

- feelings of fatigue or weakness
- repetitive infections or fever
- bone and joint pain
- refusing to walk, which likely results from bone pain or fatigue
- easy bleeding or bruising (including petechiae)
- increased paleness of skin
- abdominal pain or fullness, which may cause shortness of breath or loss of appetite
- swollen lymph nodes under the arms, in the groin, chest and neck.
- enlarged spleen or liver
- weight loss
- rash

== Causes ==
The exact cause of most cases of childhood leukemia is not known. Most children with leukemia do not have any known risk factors.

One hypothesis is that childhood acute lymphoblastic leukemia (ALL) is caused by a two-step process, starting with a prenatal genetic mutation and then exposure to infections While this theory is possible, there is not enough evidence in patients currently to either support or refute the relationship between infection and developing ALL

There is evidence linking maternal alcohol consumption to AML development in children. Indoor insecticide exposure has also been linked to the development of childhood leukemias. High levels of coffee consumption during pregnancy (2-3 cups/day or greater) have been linked to childhood leukemia as well.

It has also been suggested that allergies are linked to the development of childhood leukemia but this is not supported by current evidence.

== Diagnosis ==
Childhood leukemia is diagnosed in a variety of ways. The diagnostic procedures confirm if there is leukemia present, the extent of the leukemia (how far it has spread), and the type of leukemia. The diagnostic procedures are similar for the different types of leukemias:

- A bone-marrow aspiration and biopsy to look for and collect leukemia cells. In aspiration, a fluid sample is removed from the marrow. In biopsy, bone marrow cells are removed. Usually both procedures are performed at the same time and used together to help with diagnosis.
- Tests called immunophenotyping and cytogenetic analysis are performed on the cells to further determine the type and subtype of leukemia.
- A complete blood count, which is a measurement of size, number, and maturity of different blood cells in blood.
- Blood tests may include blood chemistry, evaluation of liver and kidney functions, and genetic studies.
- A spinal tap: a special needle is placed into the lower back into the spinal canal, which is the area around the spinal cord. Cerebral spinal fluid is fluid that bathes the child's brain and spinal cord. A small amount of cerebral spinal fluid is sent for testing to determine if leukemia cells are present.

== Treatment ==
Treatment for childhood leukemia is based on a number of factors, including the type of leukemia, characteristics of the leukemia, prognostic characteristics (children with worse prognostic characteristics receive more aggressive therapy, see Prognosis section), response to therapy, and extent of the disease at diagnosis. Treatment is typically managed by a team of health care professionals, consisting of pediatric oncologists, social workers, pediatric nurse specialists, and pediatricians among others.

=== Types ===
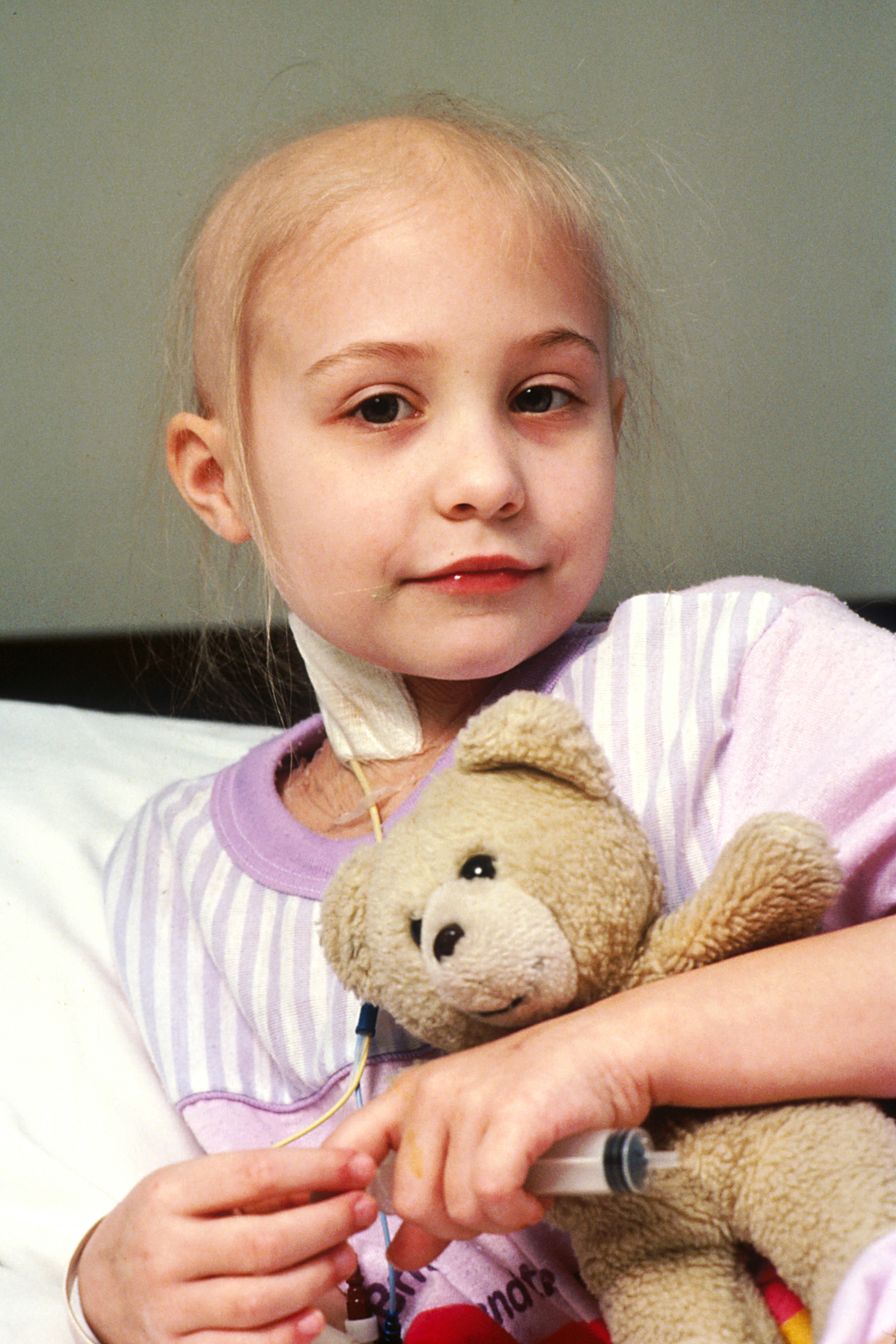
Young girl receiving chemotherapy treatment

While the exact treatment plan is determined by the type of leukemia and factors listed above, there are five types of therapies that are generally used to treat all childhood leukemias. Four of these are standard treatment and one is in clinical trials. The four specific types of treatments that are traditionally used are chemotherapy, stem cell transplant, radiation therapy and targeted therapy. Immunotherapy is another type of therapy that is currently in clinical trials.

Chemotherapy is a treatment that uses chemicals to interfere with the cancer cells ability to grow and reproduce. Chemotherapy can be used alone or in combination with other therapies. Chemotherapy can be given either as a pill to swallow orally, an injection into the fat or muscle, through an IV directly into the bloodstream or directly into the spinal column.

Stem cell transplant is a process in which the blood-forming cells that are abnormal (like leukemia cells) or that were destroyed by chemotherapy are replaced with healthy new blood-forming cells. A stem-cell transplant can help the human body produce more healthy white blood cells, red blood cells, or platelets. It also reduces the risk of life-threatening conditions such as anemia, or hemorrhage. Stem cell transplants can be done by obtaining cells from the bone-marrow, blood or umbilical-cord blood. Stem cell transplants can use the cells from one's self, called an autologous stem cell transplant or they can use cells from another person, known as an allogenic stem cell transplant. The type used in childhood leukemia is typically allogenic. The donors used must be a match to the child getting the transplant by a marker called HLA

Radiation therapy uses various types of radiation to kill cancer cells.

Targeted therapy is the use of medication to specifically kill the cancerous cells. The medication is able to leave healthy normal cells alone while it targets the cancer. These include tyrosine kinase inhibitors (TKIs), monoclonal antibodies, and proteasome inhibitors.

Immunotherapy is a type of therapy that uses the child's own immune system to fight the cancer. This therapy is currently in clinical trials.

=== ALL ===
Treatment for childhood ALL consists of three phases: induction, consolidation/intensification, and maintenance.

- Induction is intended to kill the large majority of the cancer cells. It typically lasts for 4–6 weeks and uses chemotherapy and glucocorticoids. After induction, the goal is to put the cancer into remission. Remission means that cancer is no longer detected in the bone marrow or blood and that normal cells have returned to the bone marrow. However, remission does not mean that the cancer is cured. It is thought there are still cancer cells that are hiding in the body, so more treatment is needed to kill them.
- Consolidation/Intensification is used to kill any remaining cells that have the potential to become cancerous. It consists of more chemotherapy and lasts for a few months.
- Maintenance is a lower intensity chemotherapy regimen that used to kill any more remaining cells in the bone marrow that could regrow into cancer cells and cause the leukemia to come back. It lasts for 18–30 months.

Immunotherapy, radiation therapy, stem cell transplant, and targeted therapies may also be used in the treatment of ALL. This will depend on the extent of ALL, the characteristics of the ALL and if it has recurred (come back after initial treatment).

=== AML ===
Childhood AML is a more challenging cancer to treat than childhood ALL. Childhood AML treatment usually consists higher dose chemotherapy given over a shorter period of time compared to ALL treatment. Due to this shorter and more intense treatment, side effects are also more intense. These children are therefore treated in treatment centers or hospitals where they will stay for longer period of their treatment. Treatment for AML consists of 2 phases: induction and consolidation. There is no Maintenance phase of therapy in AML as it was not shown to lower chances of the cancer coming back.

- Induction is aimed at killing leukemia in the blood and bone marrow. Its goal is to put the cancer into remission. Treatments used in induction therapy for childhood AML may include chemotherapy, targeted therapy, radiation therapy, stem cell transplant, or other treatments as part of a clinical trial. The exact treatment will vary depending on characteristics of the child and the cancer.
- Consolidation begins after remission is obtained and is aimed at killing any remaining cancer cells. It will again vary depending on specifics about the patient and cancer. It typically will consist of chemotherapy followed by a stem cell transplant.

In addition to these treatments, there are also clinical trials of immunotherapy and targeted therapy for AML. The APL type of AML is also treated with all-trans retinoic acid or arsenic trioxide therapy in addition to what is listed above.

=== Other childhood leukemias ===
JMML is typically treated by chemotherapy followed by a stem cell transplant. CML is typically treated with targeted therapy and possibly a stem cell transplant if it comes back or does not respond to the targeted therapy at first.

== Prognosis ==
The 5-year survival rate for children with leukemia is 83.6% in the USA. This means that 83.6% of children diagnosed with leukemia live for 5 years or more after their diagnosis. This is greatly improved from a 5-year survival rate of 36.5% in 1975. The improvement is largely attributed to advances in therapy, particularly therapy for ALL. The outlook or prognosis for an individual child is affected by the type of leukemia. In addition, there are certain characteristics of the patients and cancers that help doctors predict the prognosis (and determine treatment). These are referred to as prognostic factors. Generally prognostic factors are more meaningful in ALL than in AML.

=== ALL ===
The 5-year survival rate for children and adolescents under the age of 15 years diagnosed with ALL was 91.8% in the USA between 2007 and 2013. The survival rate for children under the age of 5 years with ALL was 94% during the same time period.

Prognostic factors in ALL:

- Age at diagnosis: Children between the ages of 1–9 years with B-cell ALL (a specific type of ALL) have better cure rates than children less than 1 year old or over 10 years old. This does not seem to matter in T-cell ALL (another specific type of ALL).
- White blood cell count at diagnosis: Children with very high white blood cell counts at diagnosis are higher risk patients than those with lower counts.
- Specific type of ALL
- Spread to other organs (such as the brain, spinal cord, and testicles) signifies worse prognosis
- Chromosome changes: Patients whose leukemia cells have more chromosomes are more likely to be cured. Different chromosome translocations are also associated with different prognoses.
- Initial treatment response: Children who respond to treatment quickly initially have a better prognosis.

=== AML ===
The survival rate for children under the age of 15 years with AML was 66.4% in the USA between 2007 and 2013. This is lower than the rates for ALL.

Prognostic factors for AML:

- Age at diagnosis: Children under 2 years old may have a better prognosis than older children. However, how strong this link is is unclear.
- White blood cell count at diagnosis: Children with lower white blood cell counts tend to have a better prognosis.
- Children with Down Syndrome and AML typically have a good prognosis.
- Specific type of AML: APL generally is a good prognosis.
- Specific chromosome changes affect prognosis.
- AML that started because of treatment for a different cancer usually has poorer prognosis.
- Response to treatment: As with ALL, patients whose disease responds faster to treatment tend to have a better prognosis.
- Children who are a normal weight usually have a better prognosis than those who are overweight or underweight.

=== Aftereffects ===
As treatments for childhood leukemias have gotten better, there are more children surviving and living into adulthood. These survivors are at risk for longterm aftereffects of treatment. The specific risks depend on the type of therapy that was given and the type of cancer the child had.

The older aggressive treatment regimens with cranial irradiation and higher doses of anthracyclines (such as doxorubicin) caused increased risk of solid tumors, heart failure, growth retardation, and cognitive defects. In types of childhood leukemias with good cure rates (mainly ALL), efforts are continually made to decrease the amount of toxicity caused by chemotherapy and other treatments.

Secondary cancers
Survivors who received treatment for childhood leukemia are at risk for developing a secondary cancer later in life. The risk of acquiring a second cancer is weighed against the benefit of receiving therapy for life-threatening leukemia.
Neurological
Survivors of ALL are at risk for various neurocognitive and neuropsychological issues that affect their quality of life. These include issues with attention span, vision, processing speed, memory, growth failure, malnutrition, obesity, reduced fertility, psychiatric problems. All of the latent effects listed impact patients.
Growth and development
Some childhood leukemia treatments, notably stem cell transplants, can stunt growth. Growth hormone is sometimes given to help with this.
Fertility
Fertility may be affected in both boys and girls who receive leukemia treatment.
Bone problems
Bone problems or damage may result from glucocorticoids.
Emotional
Childhood leukemia is a very taxing disease, on the caregiver and the child. Some emotional issues that survivors have reported include: depression, anxiety, post-traumatic stress disorder, difficulties with interpersonal relationships, poor body image, and schizophrenia among other issues. However, it is unclear if the rates of mental and emotional problems are higher in childhood leukemia survivors than the general population. Regardless, some children may have emotional or psychological issues that may be addressed by doctors, other care team members, parents, and friends.

== Epidemiology ==
Leukemia is the most common cancer in children, accounting for 25-30% of all cancers in children and adolescents. It most commonly is diagnosed in children when they are 1–4 years old. The median age of diagnosis is 6 years old. Childhood leukemia is more common in boys than girls. It is also more frequently diagnosed in white and Hispanic children. The incidence of childhood leukemia has been increasing over time. However, this may be because of increased ability to detect, diagnose, and report the disease, rather than an actual increase in children who are affected.

ALL is the most common type of childhood leukemia, accounting for 75-80% of diagnoses. ALL is most commonly is diagnosed in 3-5-year-old children. As with childhood leukemia in general, it is more common in boys than girls and more common in white and Hispanic children.

AML is the second most common type of childhood leukemia, making up most of the remaining diagnoses. It is most commonly diagnosed in children less than 1 year old. Unlike ALL, it occurs equally in boys and girls and occurs equally across racial/ethnic groups.

There are a number of risk factors that have been studied for childhood leukemia. Genetic risk factors include: Down syndrome, Fanconi anemia, familial monosomy 7, Shwachman–Diamond syndrome, Bloom Syndrome, as well as mutations in specific gene mutations. Besides genetic risk factors, exposure to ionizing radiation is a known risk factor for childhood leukemia. Other factors that may be linked to development of childhood leukemia include: family history of blood cancers, maternal alcohol use, parental cigarette use, prior loss of pregnancy in the mother, older age of the mother, high birth weight, low birth weight, exposure to benzene, exposure to pesticides, and infections. However, whether or how much these factors actually contribute to the development of leukemia has yet to be determined and is unclear.

== History ==
Before 1948, childhood leukemia was uniformly fatal, with most children dying within weeks to months of diagnosis. In 1948, Sidney Farber and colleagues achieved the first temporary remissions in children with acute leukemia using aminopterin, a folic acid antagonist, marking the beginning of chemotherapy for the disease.

During the 1950s, researchers including George Hitchings and Gertrude Elion developed 6-mercaptopurine, and Emil Frei, Emil J. Freireich, and James Holland designed the first combination chemotherapy regimens. In 1961, Frei and colleagues achieved a complete remission rate of 59% and a 2-year survival rate of approximately 20% using a combination of mercaptopurine and methotrexate.

A major breakthrough came in 1962 when Donald Pinkel and colleagues at St. Jude Children's Research Hospital initiated "Total Therapy," featuring remission induction, central nervous system-directed therapy, intensification, and continuation treatment. The Total Therapy V study at St. Jude (1967–68) achieved cures in approximately half of enrolled patients, marking the first significant cure rate for childhood leukemia. By the 1970s, two pivotal studies showed that intensification therapy could boost cure rates to nearly 70%.

The 1980s and 1990s saw further refinements, including risk stratification based on age, white blood cell counts, and genetic findings, allowing treatment to be tailored to individual patients. Researchers also developed alternatives to cranial radiation, finding that intensive chemotherapy directed at the spinal fluid could protect the brain with fewer long-term side effects.

By the 2010s, approximately 85–90% of children with acute lymphoblastic leukemia in North America and Europe survived at least five years after diagnosis. This improvement resulted from optimized chemotherapy regimens, molecular diagnostics, targeted therapies such as imatinib for Philadelphia chromosome-positive ALL, and improved supportive care. More recently, immunotherapies including CAR T-cell therapy have further improved outcomes.

Physician and researcher John Laszlo, who worked at the National Cancer Institute's Acute Leukemia Service under Frei and Freireich in the 1950s, later documented this history in his 1995 book, The Cure of Childhood Leukemia: Into the Age of Miracles, based on interviews with key figures including Pinkel, Hitchings, Elion, Frei, Freireich, Holland, and others. The book has been described as an "essential primary source for anyone interested in oncology and its history."
