= Charles v. Principi =

US Court of Appeals for Veterans Claims case

Charles vs. Principi
- Court: United States Court of Appeals for Veterans Claims
- Decided: October 3, 2002
- Citation: 16 Vet.App. 370

Case history
- Appealed from: Board of Veterans Appeals

Court membership
- Judges sitting: Farley and Ivers
- Chief judge: Kramer

Charles vs. Principi is a United States Court of Appeals for Veterans Claims case that dealt with competency and VA's duty to assist.

== Background ==
The Veteran appealed a Board of Veterans Appeals decision that determined that new and material evidence had not been submitted to reopen his claim for right ear hearing loss and that denied his claim for service connection for tinnitus. The Veteran served on active duty from December 1943 to September 1945. The VA Regional Office denied his original claim for service connection for hearing loss of the right ear in 1945 on the basis that the condition was not found on his discharge examination and there was no in-service treatment for the condition. In 1998, the Veteran filed a reopened claim and a new claim for tinnitus. He was scheduled for an examination in April 1999 and diagnosed with hearing loss and tinnitus. He attended a hearing at the Regional Office in May 1999 and testified regarding his in-service noise exposure and experience of having had ringing in his ears during and since service. The VA Regional Office ultimately did not reopen the finally denied claim for hearing loss, as it held that new and material evidence had not been submitted. The VA Regional Office also denied the claim for tinnitus as being not well grounded.

While the claim was pending, the Veterans Claim Assistance Act of 2000 was passed. A Supplemental Statement of the Case (SSOC) was completed and denied the tinnitus as not being incurred in service. The Board of Veterans Appeals upheld the decision, stating that the Veteran had not identified post-service treatment records that VA could obtain on his behalf. The Board stated that the duty to assist had been met. In regards to the hearing loss claim, the Board did not reopen the hearing loss claim because it stated that the Veteran had not provided evidence of a nexus to service. In regards to the tinnitus claim, the Board stated that there was no evidence of a medical nexus and there was no evidence that this condition was incurred in or aggravated by service.

== Analysis ==
The Court stated that in regards to the tinnitus claim, the VA failed to fulfill its duty to assist. The Court pointed out that tinnitus is capable of lay observation. Since the Veteran provided competent and credible lay evidence that the condition “may be associated with [his] active service”, VA’s duty to assist requires that a medical nexus opinion be ordered.

== Decision ==
The Court vacated the 2001 Board decision and the case was remanded for readjudication.
