= M21-1 Adjudication Procedures Manual =

U.S. Department of Veterans Affairs policy and procedures manual

The M21-1 Adjudication Procedures Manual (hereinafter, "M-21 Manual" or "Manual") details policies and procedures for Veterans Benefits Administration (VBA) staff who develop and adjudicate U.S. veterans' disability benefit claims.

== Features ==
The M21-1 Manual contains features designed to assist Veterans Benefits Administration (VBA) staff and other users.

=== In-text hyperlinked references ===
The Manual frequently references statutes, regulations, and case law relevant to the particular policy or procedure discussed therein.

=== Continuously updated ===
The Veterans Benefits Administration (VBA) continuously updates the Manual, with the dates of any additions, deletions, or modifications provided within the Manual itself.

=== Improved usability ===
The Veterans Benefits Administration has made an effort to improve the usability of the Manual. Beginning in 2015 the agency transferred the Manual from the WARMS (Web Automated Reference Material System) platform (Note: Note the warning at the top of that web page: "The content found here may be out-of-date. The most recent content is available via KnowVA at http://www.knowva.ebenefits.va.gov/.") to their KnowVA Knowledge Base.

=== Case law summaries ===
The Manual includes a concise synopsis of important veterans law cases decided by the Court of Appeals for Veterans Claims, Court of Appeals for the Federal Circuit, and U.S. Supreme Court. (Note: See, e.g., Nieves-Rodriguez v. Peake, 22 Vet. App. 295 (2008) in the M21-1 Manual.)

== Legal status ==
The M21-1 Adjudication Procedures Manual does not constitute law, in contrast to statutes, federal regulations, and federal case law. The Department of Veterans Affairs has stated, “[t]he M21-1 is an internal manual used to convey guidance to VA adjudicators. It is not intended to establish substantive rules beyond those contained in statute and regulation.” At the same time, federal courts consult the M-21 Manual to determine if VA's actions conform with their own regulations, policies, and procedures, and to gain insight into the meaning and intent of VA regulations.

=== Does the M21-1 Manual constitute rule-making subject to review by the Federal Circuit? ===
Seal of the United States Court of Appeals for the Federal Circuit

Veterans advocacy organizations such as Disabled American Veterans (DAV) and the National Organization of Veterans' Advocates (NOVA) have argued that many additions to the M21-1 Manual constitute "interpretative rules" and that the Federal Circuit therefore has jurisdiction to review such changes upon direct appeal by a veteran. The Federal Circuit concluded in 2017 that M2-1 Manual provisions do not fall under the purview of the Court. However, in 2020 the court overruled aspects of that decision in National Organization of Veterans’ Advocates, Inc. v. Secretary of Veterans Affairs (Fed. Cir. 2020), a unanimous en banc decision.

In an amicus brief for that 2020 case (NOVA v. Sec'y Veterans Affs.), the National Veterans Legal Services Program (NVLSP), Veterans of Foreign Wars (VFW), and Paralyzed Veterans of America (PVA) had argued:

Congress require[s] Federal Register publication of all generally applicable interpretive rules ... [the Department of Veterans Affairs cannot] evade section 552(a)(1) by issuing a generally applicable rule in the [M21-1 Adjudication Procedures] Manual. Promulgation of “interpretations of general applicability” via a manual does not make them any less reviewable. If DAV’s [DAV v. Secretary of Veterans Affairs (Fed. Cir. 2017)] erroneous mutual exclusivity theory survives, DVA [Department of Veterans Affairs] can insulate substantive rules and generally applicable policy statements and interpretations, and avoid pre-enforcement judicial review, simply by promulgating them through the Manual.

In NOVA v. Secretary of Veterans Affairs (Fed. Cir. 2020), the court stated that the "government also concedes that whether an interpretive rule is actually published in the Federal Register does not dictate whether this court has jurisdiction, as 'VA cannot insulate a rule from pre-enforcement review simply by placing it in the Manual'" and the "VA Manual provision governing knee joint stability … announces VA’s adoption of an interpretive rule establishing a new metric for assessing knee instability claims. It limits VA staff discretion, and, as a practical matter, impacts veteran benefits eligibility for an entire class of veterans."

== Prominent M21-1 sections ==
Some sections of the M21-1 Manual have received significant attention from various groups such as investigatory bodies like the VA Office of Inspector General or General Accountability Office, veterans service organizations, the press, Congress, and others.

=== Telehealth and telemental health examinations ===
In February 2020, the Department of Veterans Affairs Office of Inspector General (VAOIG) issued an audit report titled, Telehealth Public-Use Questionnaires Were Used Improperly to Determine Disability Benefits, which critiqued VBA's enforcement of telehealth examinations for mental disorders.

== Reorganization of the M21-1 Manual ==
The Veterans Benefits Administration (VBA) announced in May 2021 that they had initiated a reorganization of the M21-1 Adjudication Procedures Manual. The agency indicated they intend to “[make] the M21-1 Adjudication Procedures Manual (M21-1) a more consumable and navigable resource.” One implication of this reorganization is that pre-2021 citations to the Manual may reference outdated locations.

== See also ==
- Board of Veterans' Appeals
- Veterans benefits for post-traumatic stress disorder in the United States
