= Duke University Hospital =

Coordinates: 36.0072°N 78.9373°W

- Duke University Health System

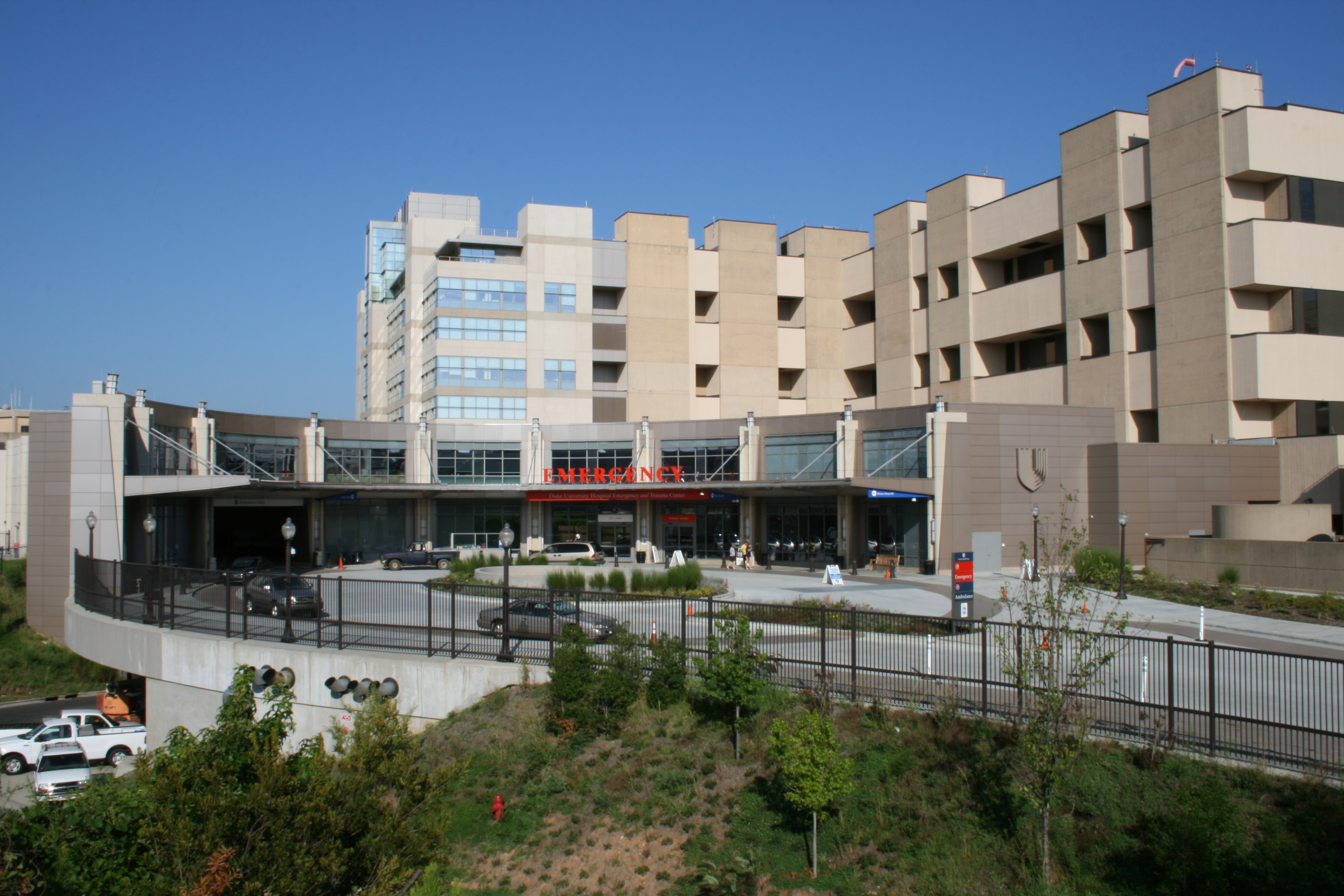
- Duke University Hospital emergency entrance

Geography
- Location: 2301 Erwin Rd, Durham, North Carolina, United States

Organization
- Care system: Private
- Type: Teaching
- Affiliated university: Duke University School of Medicine
- Network: Duke University Health System

Services
- Emergency department: Level I trauma center
- Beds: 1062

History
- Founded: 1925 as a gift from James B. Duke. Hospital did not accept patients until 1930.

Links
- Website: www.dukehealth.org
- Lists: Hospitals in North Carolina

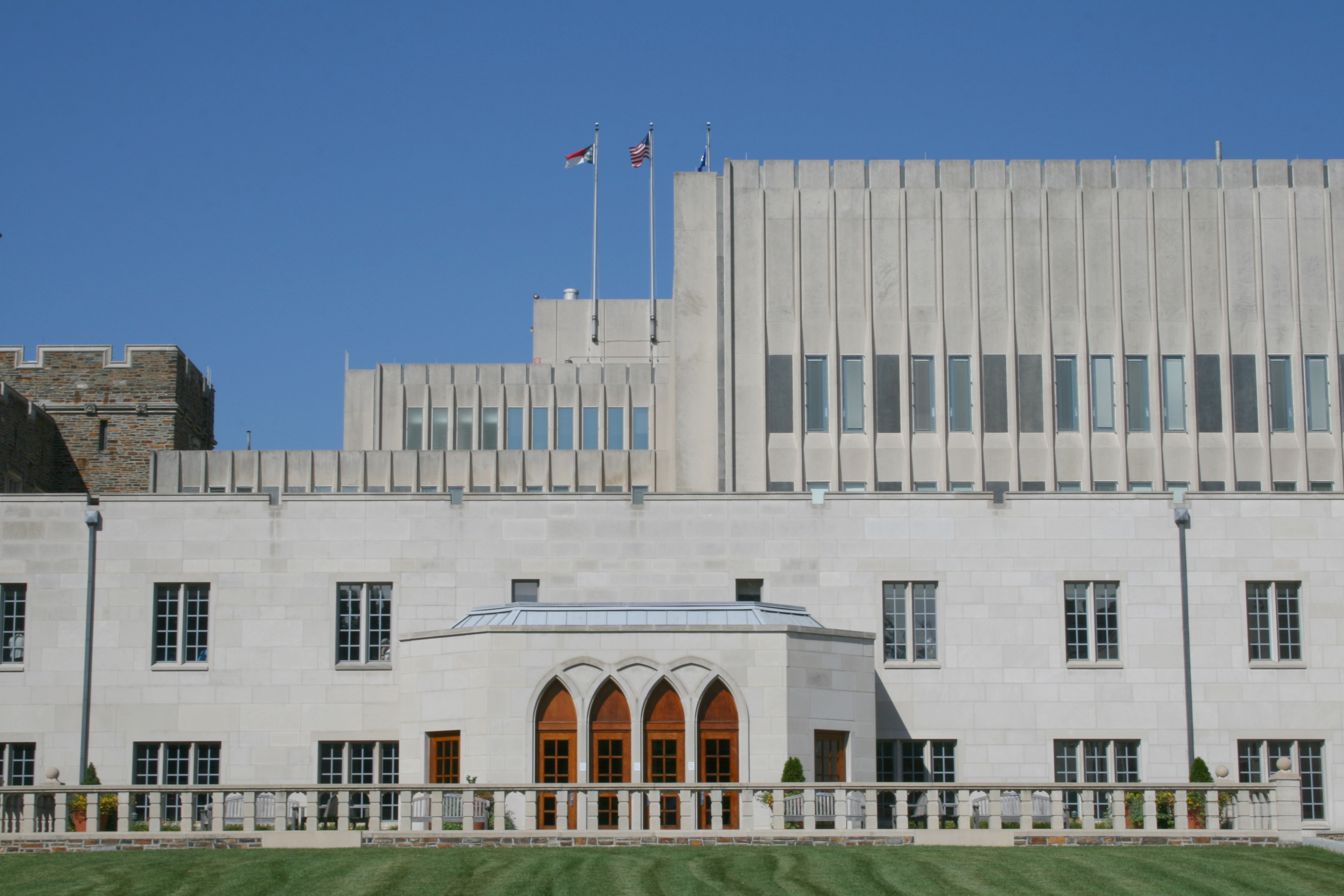
A part of the E.W. Busse Building, viewed from the courtyard at the Duke University Medical Center

Duke University Hospital, part of the Duke University Medical Center, is a 1062 -bed acute care facility and an academic tertiary care facility located in Durham, North Carolina, United States. Established in 1930, it is the flagship teaching hospital for the Duke University Health System, a network of physicians and hospitals serving Durham County and Wake County, North Carolina, and surrounding areas, as well as one of three Level I referral centers for the Research Triangle of North Carolina (the other two are UNC Hospitals in nearby Chapel Hill and WakeMed Raleigh in Raleigh). It is affiliated with the Duke University School of Medicine.

== History ==
=== 1924–1935: early years ===
The institution traces its roots back to 1924, six years before the opening of the hospital, when James Buchanan Duke established the Duke Endowment to transform Duke University (then known as Trinity College) into the research university it is today. In 1925, Duke bequeathed $4 million to establish the medical school, nursing school, and hospital. Two years later, in 1927, construction began on the original hospital (now known as Duke South), which opened on July 21, 1930, with 400 beds. In 1931, the hospital and medical school were officially dedicated on April 20 and the Private Diagnostic Clinic (Duke's in-house physician system) was organized on September 16. In 1935, less than five years after the hospital opened, the American Medical Association ranked Duke among the top 20 of medical schools in the country.

=== 1936–1969: a number of firsts ===
In 1936, a team of physicians led by Dr. Julian Deryl Hart introduced ultraviolet light in operating rooms in an effort to kill germs and combat post-operative staph infections, greatly reducing the number of infections and related deaths. In the same year, the hospital established the nation's first brain tumor program, launching what would become one of the world's most renowned programs in the field of cancer treatment. In 1937, Joseph Beard developed a vaccine against equine encephalomyelitis, one of the first known vaccines to combat the mosquito-carried disease.

In 1940, the hospital made its first expansion, adding a new wing to the original building. In 1946, the Division of Thoracic Surgery, today the Duke Division of Cardiovascular and Thoracic Surgery, was organized by Josiah Charles Trent. In 1947, the Bell Research Building became the first freestanding building on the hospital campus. In 1954, the Duke Poison Control Center was organized, becoming one of the first two organized in the country.

In 1955, psychiatrist Ewald W. Busse established the Duke University Center for Aging, the first research center of its kind in the nation. Currently the oldest continuously operating facility in the United States, this center has pioneered long-term studies of health problems among seniors.

In 1956, Duke surgeons performed the first cardiac surgery using systemic hypothermia to bring a patient's body temperature down to less than 50 degrees Fahrenheit in an effort to minimize tissue damage during lengthy surgeries. With the success of this experiment, systemic hypothermia has become standard procedure in all hospitals worldwide. In 1957, the hospital and medical school were renamed Duke University Medical Center. In 1958, Thelma Ingles, a professor and chair of the Department of Medical-Surgical Nursing, developed the clinical nursing specialist program, becoming the first master's program of its kind in the United States. The establishment of the nursing specialist program paved the way for advanced clinical knowledge in the delivery and teaching of the nursing field.

The 1960s brought extraordinary firsts to Duke. In 1963, the first African-American student was accepted to the prestigious medical school. Two years later, in 1965, the hospital established the first physician assistant program in the country. In 1966, Duke became the first medical center in the world to offer radio consultations with physicians in developing countries. This program, called Med-Aid (short for Medical Assistance for Isolated Doctors), met the critical needs of the physicians who lacked proper treatment. That same year, the Medical Scientist Training Program, a joint program leading to simultaneous M.D. and Ph.D. degrees, was established, becoming one of the first three in the nation. In 1969, the first recorded studies of human's abilities to function and work at pressures equal to a 1,000-foot (300 m) deep sea dive were conducted in the hyperbaric chamber.

=== 1970–1989: a period of growth and expansion ===
With the dawn of the 1970s, Duke underwent a period of expansion that continued well into the 1980s. In December 1971, the Duke Comprehensive Cancer Center was established under the National Cancer Act. Duke's cancer center, one of the first in the nation under this groundbreaking legislation, was officially designated as a "comprehensive" cancer center by the National Cancer Institute in 1973. That same year, the Duke Eye Center was dedicated and opened on November 8. In 1978, the Morris Cancer Research Building opened, giving researchers a place to study and find cures for the disease. DCI partners with a number of other centers and institutes including North Carolina State University and the University of Michigan Rogel Cancer Center.

During the 1970s, the hospital also faced two distinct unionization drives aimed at uniting the unskilled service workers of Duke Hospital. The 1974 and 1978 drives both ultimately failed, and the 1980s ushered in a twenty-year low in organizing and activism at the hospital.

In 1980, Duke moved into its present $94.5 million facility (Duke North) on Erwin Road, located just north of its original location. In 1985, with the emergence of AIDS bringing alarm to the medical community, Duke became one of the first two hospitals to conduct human clinical trials on AZT, the first drug to offer an improved quality of life in patients battling AIDS.

=== 1990–present: accelerated growth and expansion ===
In the 1990s, the medical research at Duke reached the forefront for the detection of ailments that can be treated with a larger success rate. In 1990, Duke geneticists invented a three-minute test to screen newborns for over 30 metabolic diseases at one time. This practice has since become standard worldwide.

In 1992, Duke's cancer center became the first hospital to develop an outpatient bone marrow transplant program. That same year, the hospital performed its first lung and heart/lung transplants.

The year 1994 marked the beginning of accelerated expansion for Duke. That year, the Levine Science Research Center and the Medical Sciences Research Center were opened. In addition, there were extensive renovations of the Duke Clinic (Duke South), additions to the Morris Cancer Research Building, a new Children's Health Center, a freestanding Ambulatory Care Center, and expanded parking options for visitors.

In 1998, the Duke University Health System was created with newly established partnerships with Durham Regional Hospital and Raleigh Community Hospital. That same year, the National Institutes of Health partnered with Duke to offer the first joint master's of health science in a clinical research degree. With this extraordinary partnership, the NIH became the first organization to offer a joint graduate degree program with a major university.

In 2001, the hospital was the first to establish a center dedicated exclusively to Cardiovascular Magnetic Resonance Imaging.

In December 2019, a team at the hospital became the first in the United States to transplant an adult heart into a recipient through a process known as donation after circulatory death. The transplant takes place after the heart has stopped beating and the donor is declared dead.

In 2019, Duke Regional Hospital began a major expansion project on its emergency department and behavioral health unit. The $102.4 million project will increase the number of private rooms and increase the number of outpatient behavioral health clinic rooms from 19 to 30.

In September 2021, doctors at Duke University Hospital completed the first heart donation after circulatory death on a child.

== Rankings and Reputation ==
In 2024, U.S. News & World Report ranked Duke University Hospital as the best hospital in North Carolina, and is rated as high performing in one adult specialty (Cancer) and in 19 procedures and conditions. It was also ranked 1st in the Research Triangle region, second among children's hospitals, as well as being nationally ranked and is recognized on the U.S. & World News Report's Honor Roll Hospitals. In 2025, Newsweek ranked Duke University Hospital as the 14th best hospital in the United States.

== Notable alumni ==
- Heidi Wunderli-Allenspach (born 1947), Swiss biologist and first women rector of ETH Zurich
- John Laszlo (born 1931), American oncologist known for advancing childhood leukemia treatment and supportive cancer care.
- Robert J. Lefkowitz (born April 1943), American physician and biochemist and winner of the 2012 Nobel Prize in Chemistry
- Paul Modrich (born June 1946), American biochemist and winner of the 2015 Nobel Prize in Chemistry
- Charles H. Townes (born July 1915), American physicist and winner of the 1964 Nobel Prize in Physics

== See also ==
- Rebecca Buckley
- Duke University School of Medicine
- Duke University
- Medical centers in the United States
