= Reonal v. Brown =

Reonal vs. Brown
- Court: United States Court of Appeals for Veterans Claims
- Decided: September 8, 1993
- Citation: 5 Vet.App. 458 (1993)

Case history
- Appealed from: Board of Veterans' Appeals

Court membership
- Judges sitting: Mankin and Steinberg
- Chief judge: Nebeker

Reonal vs. Brown is a United States Court of Appeals for Veterans Claims case that dealt with the credibility and weight assigned to medical opinions.

== Background ==
Bartolome R. Reonal served as a Philippine Scout from July 1946 to March 1947. His service medical records showed that he had broken his femur prior to service. He ended being medically discharged due to this pre-existing condition.

After service, Mr. Reonal claimed service connection for this condition. He was initially denied service connection and multiple attempts to reopen the claim were also denied. In 1988, he filed again for service connection, this time submitting a report from a doctor that stated that the condition was acquired during service and that this condition was documented on a separation report from the 20th Station Hospital at Pasig, Rizal, Philippines. The VA Regional Office did not reopen the claim once again and the Board of Veterans' Appeals (BVA) affirmed this decision. BVA noted that the medical opinion was based solely on the history of the claimant and that the doctor had not reviewed the service medical records.

== Analysis ==
The Court noted that the presumption of credibility did not apply to the medical opinion provided, since it was provided on lay history alone and was in direct opposition to the documented medical history presented in the service medical records. Since the medical opinion was flawed, it did not serve to reopen the claim, as it did not have a reasonable possibility of changing the outcome of the final decision.

== Decision ==
The Court affirmed the BVA decision and the claim was not reopened.
