= Duke University Hospital unionization drives =

The Duke University Hospital unionization drives of the 1970s involved two distinct organizing efforts aimed at uniting the service workers of Duke Hospital. The drives were defined by their fusion of the fight for worker’s rights with the battle for racial equality. The first drive in 1974 was characterized by unity amongst the workers involved, including members of the American Federation of State, County, and Municipal Employees Local 77, and a strong spirit of activism, but failed due to political infighting and resistance by the University. The second drive, organized by a representative of the national American Federation of State, County and Municipal Employees (AFSCME) in 1978, was formed on the ideals of inclusion and keeping the union free of politics. The 1978 drive failed as well, in part due to the management company that Duke hired to instill fear in its workers, and partly due to the overall lack of spirit for organizing. Despite the failure of these drives, they offer a revealing example of the convergence of civil rights and workers rights, highlighting both the status of the civil rights movement in Durham and the difficulty of instigating grassroots-level change in a corporation the size of Duke Hospital, not to mention the larger Duke University community.

== Historical context ==
Labor militancy in hospitals throughout the United States witnessed significant increases in the 1950s through the mid-1970s. This was largely the result of the contradiction between the expansion of clerical and technical jobs and the exclusion of black and unskilled workers from those jobs. Beginning in the North in the late 1950s and 1960s, the movement was characterized by the refusal of black, Hispanic, and women workers to settle for wages below the national minimum. Because these employees were centered at urban medical complexes, this dissatisfaction sparked a nationwide movement in the unionization of hospital and public workers. Southern workers expanded upon this sentiment, intentionally melding issues of class and economic justice with those of workers’ rights. Southern racism and anti-union leanings characterized Durham in the 1950s-1970s. Espousing the views of a traditional Southern community at the time, Durham, North Carolina held the sentiment that a "Negro must be kept in his place." Of all industries, the textile industry was most opposed to unions, and Durham was home to numerous textile mills. In fact, many of the key supporters of Duke University, one of Durham’s major employers, had close ties to this industry. In combination with the weak position of labor in Southern communities, the prevalence of textile mills served as a basis for Durham’s quiet, yet prevalent anti-unionist attitude.

Duke University demonstrated both the anti-union and racist attitudes of Durham while holding the power of a large corporation. Historically, blacks were confined to non- or semi-skilled jobs. While this can be partially attributed to lack of proper qualifications, Duke’s Vice President in charge of Business and Finance, Charles B. Huestis, openly admitted that Duke "practice[d] wholesale racial discrimination in its hiring policies." The salaries of these non-skilled workers reflected additional inequality, as maids and janitors, all who were black, received wages between $1.15-1.50 per hour— well below the minimum wage of $1.60. Workers were also disadvantaged in other regards, as the University had no grievance procedure, policy for summer layoffs, or job classification system. Furthermore, the University ignored the seniority system in terms of job advancement and firing procedures. Suppressing workers’ voices in the formation of workplace policies, Duke encouraged unskilled employees to simply make complaints, which their superiors then ignored. Thus, the poor working conditions, low wages, racism, and desire to secure more authority and control in the workplace provided sufficient fuel for Duke workers to consider forming a union.

== Immediate context ==
The unionization movement at the University began with a single night janitor, Oliver Harvey, who aligned the fight for unionization with the fight for civil rights from the start. Harvey, a veteran supporter of civil rights, spent a significant portion of his life striving to improve working conditions at Duke. Given his history of working to secure rights for blacks in the workplace, Harvey added a new sense of urgency to the fight for representation in the workplace. Prior to Harvey’s leadership, workers primarily utilized petitions to pressure Duke administration. After actively recruiting signatures for a petition campaign to increase wages in 1964 and receiving no response from the University administration, Harvey realized that new tactics would be necessary. Aiming to receive acknowledgement from the University, he organized the Duke Employees Benevolent Society in February 1965 and initiated a shift in the way his coworkers thought about unionizing. Considering issues in more collective terms under Harvey’s leadership, the Society affiliated with the American Federation of State, County, and Municipal Employees (AFSCME) on September 1, 1965 as the Local 77. While the organization grew in membership, it struggled unsuccessfully for two years to win benefits from the University and failed to gain full recognition by Duke until 1972. In hopes of preventing the unionization of all medical center workers, Duke allowed some hospital workers to vote in the election for the union recognition of Local 77. As demonstrated by the later unionization drives of 1974 and 1978, these efforts to stifle collective action in the hospital were futile.

Duke began to pay attention to the complaints of its workers after the assassination of Martin Luther King Jr. Inspired by King’s support of worker’s rights, students launched a demonstration supporting wage increases and collective bargaining rights for Duke’s nonacademic employees, most of whom were maids, janitors, and cafeteria workers. The demonstration involved a four-day "silent vigil" by over 2000 students on the main quad of the University. The Local 77 then decided to strike, and all members left their jobs except for hospital workers. After two weeks of employee strikes and student boycotts of classes and on-campus dining, Duke Trustees finally agreed to address the grievances of the unskilled workers, but did not grant any wage increases or implement any policy changes in the end. Despite the slow progress at Duke, labor unions in Durham made more tangible progress towards improved working conditions. Within a year or two of initial efforts, the starting pay for housekeepers rose. Split shifts ended as a result of collective bargaining, and when campus dining halls closed for summer, workers were no longer automatically fired. In many industries, employees gained health insurance, credit unions, overtime pay, paid sick days, and regular paid holidays. These advancements in the rights and wages of many workers were significant, but hospital workers had little hope until the amendment of the National Labor Relations Act in 1974.

== Unionization drive of 1974 ==
The unionization drive of 1974 marked the first instance of collective action amongst large numbers of service workers in Duke Medical Center. Energized with the spirit of activism and strong desire to gain influence in the workplace, employees worked vigorously against University resistance towards unionization. In the fall of 1974, an amendment to the National Labor Relations Act permitted the employees of nonprofit hospitals to unionize. In addition to activist initiatives from individuals, the amendment inspired a Local 77 drive to unionize all service workers in the Duke Medical Center. The drive eventually failed due to political divisions amongst organizers coupled with Duke’s desire to strike down unionization efforts, but the level of activism in the drive allowed Duke medical center workers to glimpse the strength of united action.

A significant walkout in early 1974 by data terminal operators (DTOs) exemplified the power of collective action and provided motivation for the drive. DTOs fulfilled a position that was the rough equivalent of a black secretary, and the workforce was composed exclusively of women. The DTOs at Duke felt as though their wages were unreasonably low and that this implied a lack of respect for their skills. Furthermore, they were fed up with the prevalent racism they encountered on a daily basis in the hospital. After several meetings, the DTOs successfully organized a walkout that not only demonstrated to the hospital their necessity, but also allowed the women to realize their own power. In response, the administration raised their wages, gave them days off, and increased the size of the DTO workforce. The walkout proved extremely effective and marked the first instance of collective action supporting the rights of hospital workers at Duke Medical Center.

Upon this clear victory, Local 77 recruited Howard Fuller as an organizer, which reflected the inextricable ties between the civil rights movement and the drive to unionize. Howard Fuller became a symbol of the fight for civil rights as he dedicated his life towards integrating schools, supporting nonviolence, and creating opportunity for blacks. Thus, his participation in the hospital unionization gave the drive a political undertone. Under his leadership, the drive to unionize made its first public appearance. In late 1974, Duke began working to shift paydays so that workers would receive compensation for only 25.5 paychecks instead of 26. In a university- and community-wide response, Local 77, 465 (the maintenance worker’s union), the DTO Association, the New American Movement, and the Duke Workers Alliance united in protest. Bringing together employees from a vast array of departments and disciplines, the coalition, aided by the effective leadership of Fuller, shocked the University into halting pay schedule adjustment plans immediately. This event signified a vital turning point in hospital-worker relations as Duke finally recognized the power and authority of the workers.

The drive to unionize the medical center relied heavily on developing initial strength and unity between members. One-on-one interactions ensured personalization in the process and created solidarity between the organizers and members of the drive. The primary factor that drew many individuals to the union was that it represented the synthesis of inequalities in the workplace with those of race and class, as it was one of the few non-segregated unions in the area. To garner initial support, the drive relied on publicly showcasing the advantages of unionization through addressing the complaints of individuals, leaflet campaigns, publicizing grievances, rallies, and wearing buttons. The workers’ success depended mostly on their agreement on the methods of achieving that success, especially through personal contact and maintaining a tight-knit network. While these efforts effectively mobilized support, the union had no affiliation with any international organization. The lack of international support caused funding to be a constant issue, and required careful planning on the part of the union to make the most of their budget.

Although the growing union provided a source of excitement and hope for many hospital workers, Duke Hospital did not respond favorably. By promoting an anti-union stance amongst supervisors and administrative personnel and creating leaflets depicting the evils of unionism, Duke made its views regarding the union clear. The hospital argued that a union vote proved harmful to the workers as it implied their "ingratitude" and "lack of faith." Duke did not intimidate the grassroots-level drive, however, as by June 1975, Local 77 generated a substantial number of show-of-interest cards and petitioned the National Labor Relations Board (NLRB) for a union election. Their petition listed approximately 1000 employees from disciplines across all service sectors in the hospital, from DTOs to EKG technicians, revealing the growing specialization within the medical field. By excluding office clerical workers, notably secretaries, the union-proposed bargaining unit included mostly black employees. Duke, acting consistently with their anti-union stance, wanted the NLRB to dismiss the petition on the grounds that it excluded a multitude of clerical and technical workers, suggesting that if any petition were to pass, it should include these employees in addition to those in the service sector. As those workers outside of the service sector were less concerned with unionization, the addition of clerical and technical staff to the bargaining unit would grant Duke more control over the unionization drive.

Although the NLRB did not rule in Duke’s favor, the board gave the medical center the upper hand, quashing the unionizing spirit of the drive. In November 1975, the regional hearing concluded that, while the bargaining unit proposed by the union was valid, Duke was correct in that 900-1000 clerical workers should be added. The addition of approximately 1000 white, clerical workers (who had no interest in unionization) to the bargaining unit diluted the strength of the union. As a result, the union submitted a request for national review of the decision, preparing arguments regarding skill level, education, the function of secretaries as private employees rather than hospital clericals, and the commonality of interest among the original members of the union. The review process caused a delay in the determination of the composition of the bargaining unit for another year, hampering union activity in a time when it had reached its apex. The unforeseen halt in organization activities caused by the pending NLRB decision allowed ample time for political factions to begin causing cracks in the foundation of what was once a strong union. Despite the fact that union organizers initially agreed to keep politics removed from efforts to unionize, the increased presence of political differences proved divisive and ultimately detrimental to the unionization drive. In the political sphere, the local branches of the Communist Workers Collective (CWC) and Revolutionary Workers League (RWL) held different views on how cultural and class differences and racism in organizing should be handled. The CWC was accused of using the drive for the sole purpose of gathering political support, while the RWL faced allegations of propagating the false idea that unionization would solve all of the workers’ problems. Thus, when the NLRB held the union election on November 16, 1976, the union faced a loss by a margin of 59 votes (743-684). The political infighting amongst activists contributed to destabilizing union support, but the failure of the drive cannot be attributed solely to politics. The inclusion of a majority or near-majority of white workers in the bargaining unit overwhelmed the votes of the mostly black service workers who had spent many years organizing. Furthermore, the multiple postponements of the NLRB decision allowed organization efforts to slow and lose energy. The loss did not simply affect the union as a whole, as many individuals avoided involvement in future unionization drives, as they were tired of "being pulled in two different directions." This diminished momentum had extreme implications for the unionization drive of 1978.

== Unionization drive of 1978 ==
The efforts to begin another unionization drive began between 1974-1976, soon after the previous drive ended. While the issues involved in the second drive paralleled those of the last—low wages, lack of benefits, unfair grievance procedures, racism against a workforce that was nearly 60% black—this drive prioritized a depoliticized atmosphere to avoid the infighting of the last drive. The second drive was organized in a more bureaucratic manner than the first as a representative from the international AFSCME led the organization efforts. Thus, the context in which the second drive was coordinated contributed to the use of new tactics. Like the drive of 1974, the second drive failed, but this time as a result of employees’ fear of Duke and a lack of fervor in unionization efforts. Rose Gattis, a notable organizer from the previous drive, worked to revitalize the unionization spirit and mobilize workers in the summer of 1977. Gattis secured over 300 show-of-interest cards and then gained the support of the International AFSCME in the form of a representative. After several months, the AFSCME withdrew upon deciding it was too early to petition the NLRB again. Yet, by August 1978, Gattis had gathered over 900 show-of-interest cards, the AFSCME sent organizer Harold Sloan to Durham to aid the campaign, and the NLRB agreed to hold an election for a union vote on February 16, 1979. As Sloan worked with local organizers to create a powerful campaign, Duke wielded its corporate power and began secretly working with a consulting firm, Modern Management Methods (3M). 3M aimed to maximize efficiency and improve overall management within the hospital, claiming to save Duke a significant sum of money while charging $500–$700 a day per consultant. In truth, 3M worked to instill fear within the minds of hospital employees and stressed that they, as Management, expected anti-union support from the workers. Additionally, Duke distributed volumes of intimidating leaflets and exposed the high salaries of AFSCME workers. 3M also managed to convince many workers that if the union went on strike, they would face terminal unemployment. Duke was, at the time, in the process of building a new hospital wing priced at $92 million—an addition that the corporation prioritized over improving working conditions for its employees. For the University, unionization meant higher costs to employ unskilled workers, which the corporation could not afford if they hoped to achieve their goal of expansion. Even President Terry Sanford, who usually acted as a friend to unions, took a stance against the drive, as he "urg[ed] [faculty] to oppose AFSCME on the grounds that wage increases for hospital workers might compete with faculty salaries and that a hospital union would inevitably result in a strike to the detriment of patient care." Although Duke previously tolerated some unions like Local 77, the hospital drive threatened the hospital’s monetary interests, and, as a result, Duke was strongly opposed.

As Duke worked against the drive, Sloan aimed to organize a union free of political influence and focused on the inclusion of a wide variety of employees. He believed that winning the election required involving all individuals in the "collective struggle." Although the focus on unity clouded the racially charged, anti-segregation sentiments of the first drive, workers believed it might eventually give them union representation. Depoliticizing the drive meant refraining from methods that could offend white technical or clerical workers as well as including some secretaries and many white workers in unionization efforts. Prevented from publicizing individual grievances because they were centered on race, the second drive failed to generate as much support as the first. As a result, while Sloan was able to gather support from a wide variety of individuals and avoid divisive politics, the urgency and motivation that characterized the 1974-1976 drive was absent in the second. In the end, Duke’s intimidation schemes and the general lack of spirit undermined the drive. By February 16, 1979, workers rejected the union in a 995-761 vote, resulting in a margin four times the size of that in 1976.

== Short-term impact ==
Entering the 1980s, the spirit of activism that characterized the hospital unionization drives had died down, marking a twenty-year low in organizing. The hospital had wielded its power and showed that grassroots movements, regardless of organization strategy, lacked authority in the face of corporations such as Duke. Workers were dejected, and as time passed, black workers were continually pushed to lower positions within the workplace. Furthermore, women filled a proportionally higher number of positions with low-wages and worsening conditions in the medical center. While some workers, namely nurses, became particularly militant, they did not work to organize for quite some time. Although unskilled workers gained a voice during the unionization drives of the prior decade, they resigned to Duke’s stifling power and did not again attempt large-scale drives within the medical center. While Duke permitted the formation of Local 77 and tolerated other unionization efforts, the medical center drives threatened the University economically. Consequently, Duke favored its own needs over those of its workers.

== Long-term significance ==
As recent as 1997, Duke Hospital has continued to employ a disproportionate concentration of black workers at the bottom of the workforce ladder. While the representation of black workers within the entirety of Duke hospital mirrored that of blacks within the Durham County (approximately 40%), "black employees made up 11-15% percent of the hospitals’ top job category" and 79-89% of service jobs. While numbers regarding the racial composition of Duke Hospital’s service sector are publicly unavailable, it is clear that, as of 1997, the representation of minorities in management positions could be improved.

Over the years, Duke has maintained its anti-union stance, especially within the medical center. North Carolina’s status as a right-to-work state renders unionization difficult, and Duke makes unionization even more challenging. In 2000, the International Union of Operating Engineers held a union drive for nurses in Duke hospital. During this campaign, many nurses claimed that Duke supported the voting rights of nurses who were "initially not included in the vote," may not "understand related grievances [of bedside professionals]," and would "likely vote no." Just as in the drive of 1974, the inclusion of these less involved nurses in the vote weakened union support. The NLRB held mixed opinions on whether the hospital was involved in unfair labor practices, but Duke was found guilty of trying to convince nurses that unionization would lead to a reduction of benefits. As history would predict, the union lost the vote. Similarly, in 2002, Constance Donahue, a registered nurse, was fired from Duke Hospital. While the hospital claimed she was fired for negligence, she argues that she was fired because she tried to initiate unionization efforts amongst nurses. While a Durham judge reached a split decision regarding Donahue’s case, the incident raises questions about Duke’s approach to dealing with unions.
