= Teaching hospitals in the United States =

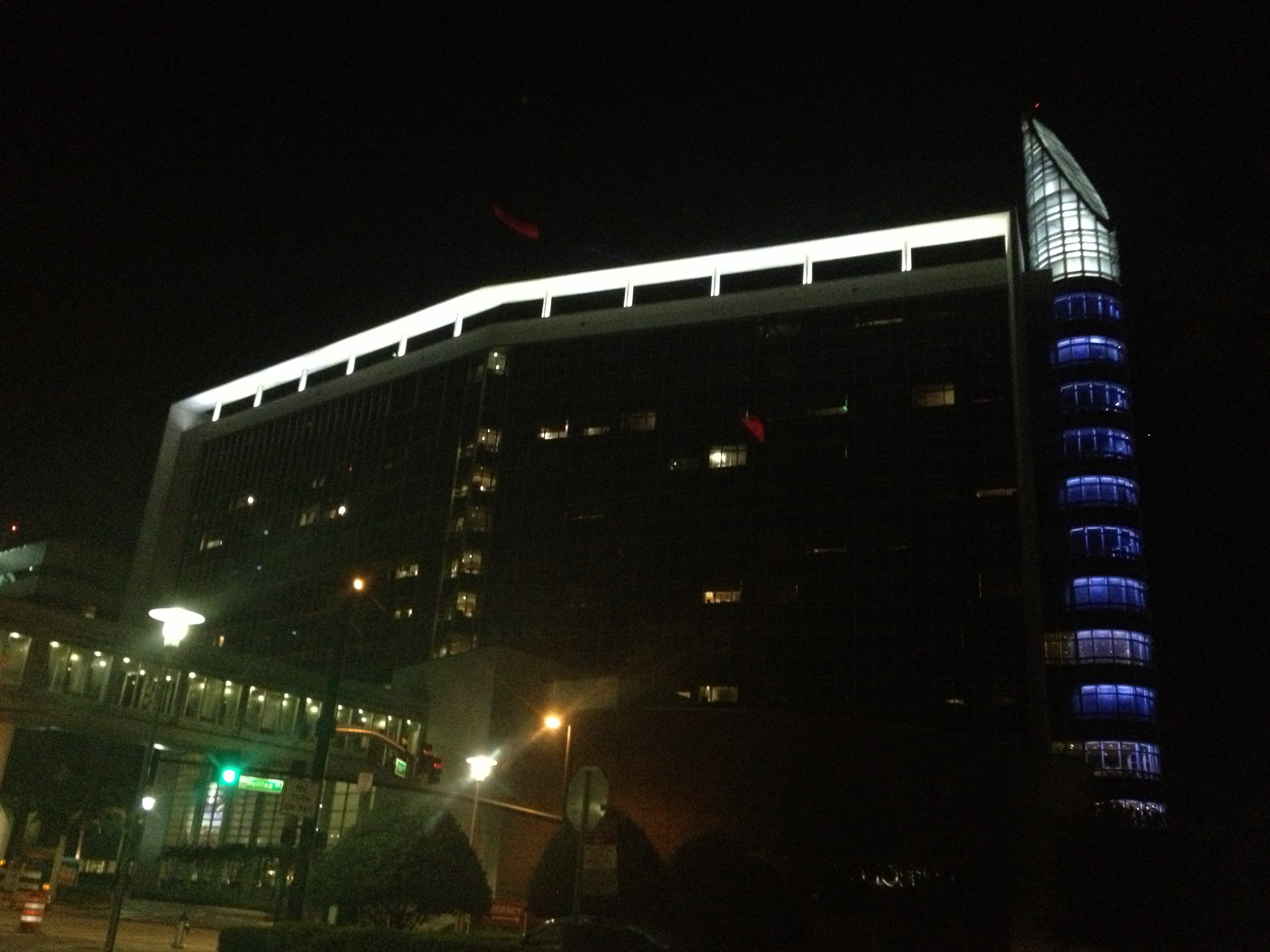
The Ginsburg Tower at AdventHealth Orlando in Orlando, Florida during the night

A teaching hospital is a hospital or medical center that provides medical education and training to future and current health professionals. Teaching hospitals are often affiliated with medical schools and work closely with medical students throughout their period of matriculation, and especially during their clerkship (internship) years. In most cases, teaching hospitals also offer graduate medical education (GME)/physician residency programs, where medical school graduates train under a supervising (attending) physician to assist with the coordination of care.

In addition to offering medical education to medical students and physician residents, many teaching hospitals also serve as research institutes.

== Origin ==
Although institutions for caring for the sick are known to have existed much earlier in history, the first teaching hospital, where students were authorized to methodically practice on patients under the supervision of physicians as part of their education, was reportedly the Academy of Gundishapur in the Persian Empire during the Sassanid era.

== History in the United States ==
The first teaching hospital in the United States was founded at the College of Philadelphia (now the University of Pennsylvania) in 1765. Following that were King's College of New York in 1768, Harvard University in 1783, Dartmouth College in 1798, and Yale University in 1810 to begin the history of notable university-affiliated teaching hospitals in America.

=== Clinical teaching 1800–1900 ===
Between 1810 and 1910, almost 400 medical schools were opened, however none were yet associated with local hospitals. However, many of them were inferior to those created by the University of Pennsylvania in 1874 and Lakeside Hospital in Cleveland in 1898. This is in part due to publishing of the Flexner Report which revealed the weaknesses of the United States current system for clinical teaching. Of the 400 medical schools established, the majority did not have control of hospital facilities, such as wards, to be used for teaching and research. As a result, these institutions could not adapt at clinical curriculum of learning by doing, which the Flexner Report supported as the most effective method of clinical education. Additionally, many states mandated all physician to earn a state license of practice. By 1895, every state was obliged to create a board of medical examiners to design and administer standardized state examinations in a range of topics from those mainly in medicine to pathology and pharmacology. The introduction of state examinations reduced the number of medical students practicing. The increasing requirements for medical schools and future practitioners led to the immediate closure of many medical schools in the United States.

While the provisions listed above led to closure of many universities, but also an increased quality of teaching at the available medical education schools.

=== The rise of teaching hospitals in the 20th-century United States ===
Before the start of the twentieth century, very few university teaching hospitals even existed within the United States. Those that did exist, however, received very little public support and confidence. Following the publishing of the Flexner Report in 1910, clinical instruction was revised and thus led to the development of teaching hospitals across the United States. Many were established with the aim of engaging medical students in clinical practice, improving patient care and services, and expanding the local and global impact of medical institutions through both medical education and research.

The prevalence of teaching hospitals grew with great force. In 1910, three notable universities and hospitals unified: the College of Physicians and Surgeons (Columbia University) with Presbyterian Hospital in New York; Harvard Medical School with the Peter Bent Brigham Hospital in Boston; and Washington University Medical School with the Barnes and St. Louis Children's Hospital in St. Louis.

Efforts to establish these teaching hospitals in Boston, New York and St. Louis required the collective efforts on the part of the universities and their medical schools. To do so they had to persuade the hospital's board of trustees or the local and state governments to provide the necessary funds for hospitals to be used for clinical education. As an example, in 1914 the University of Nebraska's Dean of the College of Medicine proposed to the Nebraska legislature reason for why funds should be put towards the development of the university-affiliated teaching hospital. They argued that "every Medical College of any standing in the country is associated either with a university hospital, ... or controls a large number of beds in a municipal Institution."

However, in many cities, local politics was a large force hindering the movement. In 1919, the Denver Colorado School of Medicine, politically appointed city officials assumed the greatest control over the universities teaching hospital. In their position, these officials took decisions without consultation of the medical school, thus limiting the school's control over how they would clinically train their students. It was such issues that caused closure of many medical schools and created discrepancies in teaching practices across medical schools.

Many medical schools struggled to persist as a result of increasingly strict American Medical Association (AMA) guidelines mandating that medical schools secure control over a large hospital. In 1913, for example, Drake University College of Medicine dropped from the highest class of medical schools as the AMA noted that they were not strongly affiliated with a large, local hospital. However, for the university lacked $3,000,000 to build a "first-rate" and thus considered merging their schools with the Iowa State University.

By 1921, every remaining medical school was affiliated with a hospital as either an owner or a partner. As more universities and local hospitals established affiliations, there were improvements in patient care as there was an increased number of doctors available to observe and treat ill patients. For acutely ill patients, teaching hospitals were significant advancements as there was always a medical professional on staff to observe and handle emergencies. As the number of medical professionals on staff increased, there was also an apparent improvement in the accuracy and care taken in the diagnosis of patients. This gave medical professionals a greater understanding of both existing and novel conditions which contributed to effective treatments and remedies.

Additionally, the transition of the country to a more scientific nature of medical knowledge and practice and notable scientific advancements of the early 19th century made practitioners and students skilled in areas ranging from chemistry to immunology. This greater knowledge in science and technology was not only valuable to their clinical practice, but it also helped medical scientists garner more respect in the eyes of the public.

Furthermore, the quality of patient care improved as the American Medical Association enacted stricter guidelines for accepting medical students. Higher entrance requirements ensured that all medical school candidates were more intelligent and good mannered than previous classes of admitted medical students. For example, the Peter Bent Brigham Hospital benefited from its affiliation to the Harvard Medical School as renowned scientists Walter Cannon, William Councilman, and Otto Folin joined their medical staff.

The establishment of teaching hospitals also created more opportunity for scientific research within the hospital itself. As a consequence of the popular viewpoint that the hospital has the responsibility to foster research, there was an increased need of unions between Universities and Hospitals. Many universities were motivated to pursue medical research to bring their universities global recognition.

Such affiliations were also economically advantageous as hospitals served as teaching facilities for medical students that would otherwise be unavailable to them. Similarly, Medical schools made available specialized staff that were equipped and maintained hospital labs. In the case of Washington University in St. Louis, the university's medical school provided the joint Children's and Barnes Hospital with laboratories, salaries for physicians, and even a power plant that served the entire medical complex.

As the 1920s progressed however, the persistent control local politicians control over teaching practices made it difficult to standardize clinical curriculums nationwide. These schools differed on issues such as how many students were practicing each day, at what year students in their education should have clinical experiences, and even what hours these students should be admitted into wards—although it was odd to see a student in these wards during night rotations. By the 1950s, most medical students themselves began to describe their responsibilities as "modest"

== General organization and structure ==
Teaching hospitals rose to prevalence in the United States beginning the early 1900s and they largely resembled those established by Johns Hopkins University, the University of Pennsylvania and the Lakeside Hospital in Cleveland. The hospitals that followed the example of these universities were all very large, technologically sophisticated and aimed to have a global impact through both patient care and scientific research. Additionally, these hospitals had large patient bases, an abundant financial resources, and renowned physicians, advisors and staff. Many of the medical schools that ensued the prospect of being associated to a nearby hospital tended to be private institutions that received philanthropic support.

=== Hierarchy ===
In the initial design of the teaching hospital, universities were given autonomy to appoint medical staff of the hospital and hospital trustees gave consent to physicians and medical students for using their hospital for both clinical and scientific work. Under the same model, students were given smaller responsibilities including changing dressings, taking blood samples and analyzing for specimen, handling catheters and treating patients with minor injuries.

As teaching hospitals serve as locations for further medical education, it consists of many levels of doctors/doctors-in-training. The first of these is completing an internship. Sometimes referred to as first-year residents, interns are doctors completing their first year of training after graduating from medical school. This stage is completed under complete supervision, as it is before they are licensed. The next stage is residency. Residency can be anywhere between a four to eight-year process, depending on the hospital. A resident completes at least three years of supervised hands-on training within these years as a transition into their unsupervised patient care. The level of residency also contains sub-levels, being junior resident, senior resident, and chief resident. After this, some doctors move onto fellowship, which is where they declare a focus in a certain type of medicine and work directly under attending physicians. Attending physicians or more simply Attendings are responsible for making most direct patient-care decisions in a hospital. They answer to the head of their department. These are all below the overseer of all staff: the medical director. He or she is responsible for policies, practices, and keeping all others in check.

This hierarchy exists in each of the departments in a hospital, which are divided into broad specialties, all having more specific discipline (focus) of their own. The structure of these specialties began with the Johns Hopkins Hospital in 1888 and the creation of the Johns Hopkins School of Medicine, with their first four departments being Medicine, Surgery, Pathology, and Gynecology.

=== Funding and resources ===
While some funding comes from Medicaid for the GME process, teaching hospitals must consider paying residents and fellows within their budgets. These additional costs vary between hospitals based on funding by Medicaid and their general salary for residents and fellows. Despite these costs, they are often offset by the prices of procedures which are elevated in comparison to most non-teaching hospitals. Teaching hospitals often justify this additional cost factor by boasting that their quality of care rises above non-teaching hospitals, or ensuring the patient that they are improving medicine of the future by having their procedure done with medical trainees present.

== Treatment and services ==
Given its orientation to providing hands-on clinical work to medical and residency students, teaching hospitals use many physicians in order to treat a single patient. In just a single visit, a patient may be observed and monitored by medical students, hospital residents and the primary physician or caretaker. The practice of having a large team of physicians looking after one patient is at the center of debate regarding teaching hospitals. Some patients are strongly opposed to being observed numerous caretakers at once while others are in favor of having many individuals involved in their care.

Teaching hospitals are well known for treating rare diseases as well as extremely ill patients, but must do many additional common treatments in order to maintain income. It is often the amount of funding that determines a teaching hospital's perceived quality of care. As the data used to compare quality of care is mainly observational, it is nearly impossible to compare the quality of care between teaching hospitals and non-teaching hospitals.

== In culture ==
Teaching hospitals gained notoriety in the rise of the American "medical drama" genre of television. These are known to glorify the reality of teaching hospitals, using societal appeals in order to add dramatics. Medical dramas taking place in teaching hospitals are said to be medically inaccurate, simplified, and exaggerated, but they succeed in capturing the dedication of doctors and trainees.

Some popular examples of medical dramas that take place in teaching hospitals are St. Elsewhere, Chicago Hope, ER, Scrubs, House, Grey's Anatomy and The Good Doctor.

== See also ==
- List of university hospitals
- Morning report (medicine)
- Teaching clinic
