= John Laszlo =

American oncologist and researcher

- Born: May 28, 1931 (age 95); Cologne, Germany
- Education: Columbia University (B.A., 1951) Harvard Medical School (M.D., 1955)
- Known for: Early work in childhood leukemia treatment Research on antiemetic therapies and cannabinoids Contributions to smoking and lung cancer literature
- Spouse: Nancy Jean Warner (div. 1986) Patricia Holleran
- Children: 3
- Scientific career
- Fields: Oncology, Hematology
- Workplaces: National Cancer Institute Duke University Medical Center American Cancer Society

John Laszlo (born May 28, 1931) is an American oncologist and hematologist whose work has contributed to major developments in childhood leukemia treatment and supportive cancer care. He is professor emeritus at Duke University Medical Center and has served as national vice president for research at the American Cancer Society. Laszlo has also written widely on oncology and contributed to the scientific literature on the relationship between smoking and lung cancer.

== Early life and education ==
Laszlo was born in Cologne, Germany, to Edith Vincze, a psychiatrist who trained with Anna Freud, and Daniel Laszlo, a physician and cancer researcher specializing in folate antagonists. The family fled Vienna in 1937 to escape Nazi persecution, and they arrived on the SS Île de France in New York City in September 1938. His father joined the cancer research unit at Mount Sinai Hospital, studying cancer in mice before founding the Neoplastic Diseases Division at Montefiore Hospital, where he continued his cancer research and led an investigation of radioactive strontium.

Laszlo’s early years were marked by the challenges of immigration and the loss of his mother, who died in 1940 when John was just nine years old. He attended Columbia University, earning his Bachelor of Arts degree in 1951, and earned his M.D. from Harvard Medical School in 1955.

== Career ==
=== National Cancer Institute (1956–1959) ===
After completing an internship at the University of Chicago in 1956, Laszlo joined the National Cancer Institute (NCI) as part of his two-year Public Health Service assignment. He was assigned to the Acute Leukemia Service, where he worked under Emil "Tom" Frei and Emil J. Freireich, who were pioneering treatments for childhood leukemia. This early work marked the beginning of his long career in oncology.

At NCI, Laszlo also conducted research with Dean Burk on glucose metabolism in leukemic cells. He studied differences in metabolism between normal and leukemic lymphocytes and granulocytes, comparing aerobic and anaerobic glycolysis in these cells. This work explored the Warburg hypothesis regarding cancer cell metabolism.

=== Duke University (1959–1986) ===
In 1959, Laszlo joined Duke University Medical Center's Department of Medicine, becoming a member of the American Association for Cancer Research (AACR) the same year. He also served as Chief of Medicine at the Durham VA Hospital. He advanced through increasingly senior positions, ultimately becoming Professor of Medicine and serving as Director of Clinical Programs at the Duke Comprehensive Cancer Center from 1972 to 1983. He later received the title of Professor Emeritus at Duke University Medical Center.

At Duke, Laszlo collaborated with R. Wayne Rundles and Nobel laureates George Hitchings and Gertrude Elion of Burroughs Wellcome. In 1968, he and his collaborators published the first description of immune plasma's ability to reduce human leukemia cell burden. The following year, working with Peter Ove and Oliver Brown, he discovered a new DNA polymerase in human cancer cells. His team later studied lymphoblastoid interferon in humans and explored lipid-soluble antifolates to address transport resistance.

Laszlo conducted early research on antiemetic therapy for chemotherapy-induced nausea and vomiting. In 1980, he co-authored a study demonstrating that Δ^{9}-tetrahydrocannabinol (THC), the primary psychoactive component of cannabis, reduced nausea and vomiting in cancer patients whose symptoms were resistant to standard antiemetic therapy. He edited Antiemetics and Cancer Chemotherapy (Williams & Wilkins, 1983), a foundational text in the field, and published extensively on the management of chemotherapy-induced emesis and Physician's Guide to Cancer Care Complications (Marcel Dekker, 1986), a reference work on managing complications in cancer treatment.

In 1984, Laszlo contributed to a position paper commissioned by the AACR Scientific and Public Affairs Committee examining the relationship between smoking and lung cancer, authoring the section on clinical aspects of lung cancer. The abstract stated:

This position paper summarizes the overwhelming evidence that tobacco smoking is the cause of 30 to 40% of deaths from cancer. The focus is on lung cancer because of the sheer magnitude of this disease in males and the likelihood of a similar epidemic in females. There are two categories of evidence that indicate smoking to be the major cause of human lung cancer. Without exception, epidemiological studies have demonstrated a consistent association between smoking and lung cancer in men and now suggest a similar association in women. Chemical analyses of cigarette smoke reveal a multitude of known mutagens and carcinogens. Moreover, these chemicals are absorbed, are metabolized, and cause demonstrable genetic changes in smokers. Two consequences of smoking are evaluated. The results of treatment of lung cancer are not encouraging; despite vigorous therapy, the 5-year survival rate remains less than 10%. The social and economic costs of lung cancer and the smoking habit impinge on the productiveness of our society.

During his tenure at Duke, Laszlo served on the AACR Board of Directors for two terms (1981–1984 and 1987–1990), on the Awards Committee (1981–1983), and as associate editor for Cancer Research (1984–1986). He chaired the AACR Scientific and Public Affairs Committee (later renamed the Public Education Committee) from its inception in 1983 until January 1987, continuing as a committee member until May 1994.

=== American Cancer Society (1986–1996) ===
In 1986, Laszlo joined the American Cancer Society (ACS) as Vice President for Research, becoming National Vice President for Research in 1988. In this role, he oversaw the organization's research program.

During his time at ACS, Laszlo authored Understanding Cancer (Harper and Row, 1987), a book for general audiences, and The Cure of Childhood Leukemia: Into the Age of Miracles (Rutgers University Press, 1995). The latter, based on interviews with key figures in oncology, documents the development of leukemia treatments. The book received attention in the oncology community; C. Gordon Zubrod, who headed NCI's Division of Cancer Treatment, called it authoritative, and a 1996 review in the Journal of the National Cancer Institute noted that Laszlo "shows how the evolution of the cure for childhood leukemia was forged [...] by a series of fortuitous circumstances as much as by the pursuit of testing."

== Awards and honors ==
- Woolford B. Baker Service Award (2021): Honorary board leadership recognition by the Michael C. Carlos Museum at Emory University

== Legacy and impact ==
Laszlo was among the early investigators of treatments for childhood acute lymphoblastic leukemia (ALL), during a period when survival rates for the disease began to rise significantly. His 1995 book on the topic, The Cure of Childhood Leukemia: Into the Age of Miracles, has been described as an "essential primary source for anyone interested in oncology and its history". In supportive oncology care, Laszlo conducted early studies on antiemetic therapies, contributing to clinical understanding of cannabinoid-based antiemetics and their use in managing chemotherapy-induced symptoms. He also helped consolidate the epidemiological and biological evidence linking tobacco use to lung cancer by co-authoring the 1984 position paper Smoking and Lung Cancer: An Overview.

Beyond oncology, Laszlo contributed to broader issues in medical practice. He was a co-author of a 2003 JAMA consensus statement addressing physician depression and suicide, which examined institutional approaches to supporting physician mental health.

In recognition of his retirement from the American Cancer Society, his family and friends commemorated the occasion by establishing the John Laszlo, M.D. Excalibur Lecture, an annual series hosted by the Michael C. Carlos Museum at Emory University.

In addition to his medical work Laszlo is also connected to Duke University’s medieval art holdings through his family. Archival records from The Met Cloisters note that when Laszlo's aunt, collector Ella Baché Brummer, moved to Durham, North Carolina, in 1975 to live with her nephew, she brought parts of the Brummer collection with her. Brummer later sold and donated hundreds of medieval objects to Duke University’s Museum of Art, forming the Brummer Collection of Medieval Art.

== Personal life ==
Laszlo married Nancy Jean Warner, with whom he had three children. Following their divorce in 1986, he married Patricia Holleran, who had a daughter from a previous marriage.

Laszlo has been active in Jewish communal life in Durham, North Carolina. In the 1970s, he served as president of Judea Reform Congregation. As of the early 2020s, Laszlo remained connected to the oncology community through interviews, professional reflections, and historical accounts of his work.

== Selected works and publications ==
- Laszlo, John; Stengle, James; Wight, Kent; Burk, Dean (1958–01–01). "Effects of Chemotherapeutic Agents on Metabolism of Human Acute Leukemia Cells in vitro". Proceedings of the Society for Experimental Biology and Medicine. 97 (1): 127–131. doi:10.3181/00379727-97-23666 ISSN 0037-9727
- Laszlo, John; Landau, Bernard; Wight, Kent; Burk, Dean (1958–09–01). "The Effect of Glucose Analogues on the Metabolism of Human Leukemic Cells". Journal of the National Cancer Institute. 21 (3). doi:10.1093/jnci/21.3.475 ISSN 1460-2105
- Laszlo, J. (1974–05). "Current management of polycythemia vera and related diseases". Postgraduate Medicine. 55 (5): 168–173. doi:10.1080/00325481.1974.11713762 ISSN 0032-5481 PMID 4596317
- Laszlo, J.; Huang, A. T. (1977–07–02). "Diagnosis and management of myeloproliferative disorders". Current Problems in Cancer. 2 (1): 1–42. doi:10.1016/s0147-0272(77)80003-2 ISSN 0147-0272 PMID 268266
- Lucas, V. S.; Laszlo, J. (1980–03–28). "delta 9-Tetrahydrocannabinol for refractory vomiting induced by cancer chemotherapy". JAMA. 243 (12): 1241–1243. ISSN 0098-7484 PMID 6244418
- Laszlo, J.; Feigl, P. (1981–01–01). "Utilization of the Centralized Cancer Patient Data System". Progress in Clinical and Biological Research. 57: 31–49. ISSN 0361-7742
- Laszlo, John (1983). Antiemetics and Cancer Chemotherapy. Williams & Wilkins. ISBN 978-0-683-04899-5
- Loeb, L. A.; Ernster, V. L.; Warner, K. E.; Abbotts, J.; Laszlo, J. (1984–12). "Smoking and lung cancer: an overview". Cancer Research. 44 (12 Pt 1): 5940–5958. ISSN 0008-5472 PMID 6388830
- Laszlo, John, ed. (1986). Physician's Guide to Cancer Care Complications: Prevention and Management (Fundamentals of Cancer Management, Vol 2). Marcel Dekker, New York. ISBN 978-0-8247-7547-6
- Laszlo, John (1987). Understanding Cancer. HarperCollins. ISBN 978-0060157548
- Iland, H. J.; Laszlo, J.; Case, D. C.; Murphy, S.; Reichert, T. A.; Tso, C. Y.; Wasserman, L. R. (1987–06). "Differentiation between essential thrombocythemia and polycythemia vera with marked thrombocytosis". American Journal of Hematology. 25 (2): 191–201. doi:10.1002/ajh.2830250209 ISSN 0361-8609 PMID 3605067
- Goldstein, D.; Laszlo, J. (1988). "The role of interferon in cancer therapy: a current perspective". CA: a cancer journal for clinicians. 38 (5): 258–277. doi:10.3322/canjclin.38.5.258 ISSN 0007-9235 PMID 2458171
- Goldstein, D.; Dawson, J.; Laszlo, J. (1988). "Suppression of natural killer cell activity by hydrocortisone". Journal of Biological Regulators and Homeostatic Agents. 2 (1): 25–30. ISSN 0393-974X PMID 3140601
- Laszlo, J. (1988). "Publish and/or perish: discovery and/or fraud". Cancer Investigation. 6 (2): 235–236. doi:10.3109/07357908809077051 ISSN 0735-7907 PMID 3378193
- Cox, E. B.; Laszlo, J.; Krown, S.; Mintzer, D.; Sarna, G. (1988–06). "Phase II study of human lymphoblastoid interferon in patients with multiple myeloma". Journal of Biological Response Modifiers. 7 (3): 318–325. ISSN 0732-6580 PMID 3392554
- Laszlo, John (1995). The Cure of Childhood Leukemia: Into the Age of Miracles. Rutgers University Press. ISBN 978-0-8135-2186-2
- Laszlo, John, Neelon, Francis A. (2005). The Doctor’s Doctor: Biography of Eugene A. Stead, Jr., MD. Carolina Academic Press. ISBN 978-1594601491
