= Morning report (medicine) =

Learning session for physicians

Morning report is a teaching round and learning opportunity for medical resident physicians in North America. The event is a case-based discussion which varies by institution, serving as an opportunity for residents, attending physicians, and others to meet, present, and learn from novel or routine clinical cases.

== Detail ==
Historically, there were no attending physicians in hospitals. Therefore, morning report was likely developed to assist the chief of service with medical supervision of cases. In current times, the content, time, and frequency of the meeting varies by institution. The round may occur at the beginning of the workday, or may occur after or in the middle of patient care rounds, but morning report most often occurs in the morning and lasts for 60 minutes. The event is centered on education, clinical reasoning, evaluation of residents, and interaction between attending and resident physicians. Morning report is typically led by the chief medical resident or a faculty member and one or multiple cases are selected by the presenter, usually a member of the admitting team, and loosely presented. The case is usually inpatient in nature, but may be outpatient depending on the institution and specialty. Details about the patient case are presented and the audience is encouraged to engage in discussion regarding the management, diagnosis, and outcome of the case. The event may have selected topics for discussion or discussion topics are developed by participants during the event.

With the objective most often being education, morning report can function to cover broad medical topics, increase learning among physicians, as well as demonstrate and practice teaching skills as a new physician. Morning report is mostly appreciated by residents and faculty physicians as it provides the opportunity for physicians to expand their knowledge base, practice presentations, and improve leadership skills.

During the COVID-19 pandemic, morning report was modified and held on virtual platforms through video conferencing at many institutions. This created opportunity for continued involvement in morning report as in-person gathering was largely discouraged during these times. In some cases, this allowed multiple advantages compared to the traditional in-person morning report, such as increased accessibility and the involvement of other institutions and disciplines.

== Studies ==
One study examined morning report sessions in internal medicine residency programs, focusing on attending physicians' contributions. The research covered 250 conferences at 13 different programs between September 2020 and March 2021. Key findings showed that attending physicians made a total of 2,344 comments, with a median of 3 attendings present at each session. Most comments were brief (66% lasting less than a minute) and focused on clinical teaching, particularly on topics like differential diagnosis, management, and testing. The study also noted that the number and duration of attending comments varied between programs, potentially impacting the learning environment, and suggested that in-person and unscripted reports could increase attending participation in morning reports.

== See also ==
- Internal medicine
- Teaching hospital
