= Morning report (United States military) =

Document listing personnel changes

In the United States Army, the 'morning report' was a document produced every morning for every basic unit of the Army, by the unit clerk, detailing personnel changes for the previous day. The morning report supported strength accountability from before World War II until the introduction of SIDPERS during the 1970s.

The report was signed by the unit's commanding officer, and submitted to the appropriate higher administrative unit. It was the source for tabulation of the Army's centralized personnel records.

The morning report detailed changes in the status of soldiers in the unit on the day the change occurred, including for example, transfers to or from the unit, temporarily assignment elsewhere (TDY), on leave, promotion or demotion, and other such events. Familiar abbreviations such as KIA (killed in action), AWOL (absent without leave), WIA (wounded in action), and MIA (missing in action) were the authorized notations used on the morning report for those statuses.

When a soldier was transferred to or from another unit, his or her orders specified an Effective Date of Change of Strength Accountability (EDCSA) specifying the exact date that the soldier is counted as leaving one unit and officially joining the other. The morning reports of the respective units will show the soldier transferred out, or in, on that date, as the case may be.
