= Board of Veterans' Appeals =

US government administrative tribunal

Department of Veterans Affairs Board of Veterans' Appeals
- Department Seal

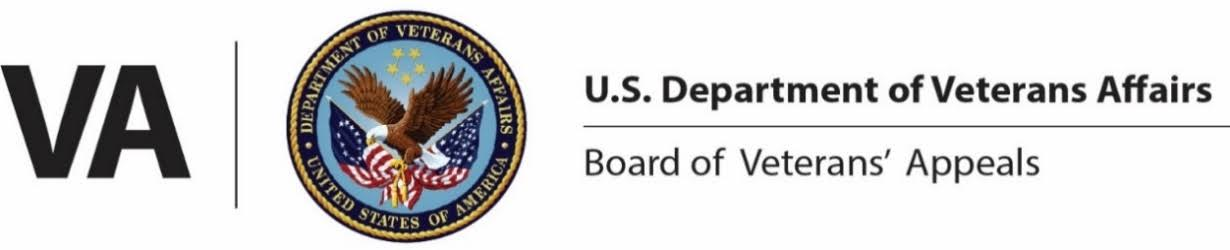
- Board of Veterans Affairs logo

Agency overview
- Formed: July 21, 1930; 96 years ago (Cabinet rank 15 March 1989)
- Type: Appellate review board for decisions made by VA agencies, on behalf of the Secretary
- Jurisdiction: United States federal government
- Status: Active
- Headquarters: Veteran Affairs Building 810 Vermont Avenue NW., Washington, D.C., U.S.
- Employees: 108 Veterans Law Judges; 850 Attorney-advisers; Non-attorney staff: unknown
- Annual budget: FY 2022: $228 million FY 2023: $285 million FY 2024: $287 million (requested)
- Agency executives: Vacant, Chairman; Vacant, Vice Chairman; Vacant, Sr. Deputy Vice Chairman
- Parent department: Department of Veterans Affairs
- Website: www.bva.va.gov

The Board of Veterans' Appeals (BVA) is an administrative tribunal within the United States Department of Veterans Affairs (VA), located in Washington, D.C. Established by Executive Order on July 28, 1933, the Board reviews and makes decisions on appeals concerning veterans' benefits. Its mission is to conduct hearings and issue decisions promptly, ensuring all relevant evidence and applicable laws and regulations are considered to provide fair outcomes for veterans, their dependents, and survivors. The Board operates on behalf of the Secretary of Veterans Affairs and is led by the Chairman of the Board of Veterans' Appeals.

The Board's jurisdiction covers all questions in matters involving decisions by the secretary under laws affecting the provision of benefits to veterans, their dependents, or survivors. Veterans, their dependents, or survivors dissatisfied with decisions made by an Agency of Original Jurisdiction (AOJ) within the VA—such as the Veterans Benefits Administration (VBA), Veterans Health Administration (VHA), National Cemetery Administration (NCA), and VA Office of General Counsel (OGC). The Board re-evaluates all evidence and legal arguments without deference to the AOJ's findings, except for favorable findings of fact for the claimant.

In Fiscal Year 2023, the BVA issued a record 103,245 decisions, marking the fifth consecutive year with over 95,000 decisions. Of these, 70,584 (68%) were legacy system appeals, and 32,661 (32%) were under the Appeals Modernization Act (AMA). The Board also reduced its pending hearings inventory by 2.6%, from 74,411 to 72,465, with a significant 85% decrease in pending legacy appeals.

== Structure of the Board ==
=== Board executives ===
The board is led by a chairman, a vice chairman, a senior deputy vice chairman, four deputy vice chairmen, an executive director for appellate support, and chief counsel. The chairman ranks equivalent to a department assistant secretary and is nominated by the president and confirmed by the Senate for a term of six years. The vice chairman is a member of the Senior Executive Service, and is appointed by the secretary, with the approval of the president, and serves at the pleasure of the secretary and is the chief operating officer of the board.

Deputy vice chairmen (or DVCs) are members of the board and of the Senior Executive Service and are appointed by the secretary, by and with the approval of the president to serve as a member of the board's executive leadership team. Their primary role is to provide oversight, guidance and management of the work product of the Veterans Law Judges, helping identify, consider, and resolve motions and appeals. Each DVC manages a team of a number of decision-writing judges and their staff counsel, with the senior deputy vice chairman performing administrative leadership functions in assisting the vice chairman with the day-to-day operations.

Other executive staff include chief counsel, who oversees the board's Quality Assurance and Improvement, CAVC Litigation Support, Customer Service and Records Management programs, and the executive director of Appellate Support, which is responsible for overseeing the non-decision-making support offices of the board, such as human resources, logistics and supplies, and IT.

=== Veterans Law Judges (VLJ) ===
The secretary may appoint any number of members that he or she deems "necessary in order to conduct hearings and dispose of appeals properly before the Board in a timely manner". Those members are appointed by the secretary, based on recommendations by the Chairman, and with the approval of the President, and must be an attorney "in good standing" with any state bar. Members are commissioned and titled as Veterans Law Judges (VLJs), and have similar duties and responsibilities to executive branch administrative law judges in the United States. As of January 2022, the Board consists of 110 VLJs, each of whom typically decide an appeal in a single-judge decision, although in certain cases, a panel decision of at least three VLJs may be formed. The Board also employs nearly 800 attorney-advisors (titled as Associate Counsel, Counsel or Senior Counsel in Board decisions, depending on paygrade and tenure) which are staff attorneys also trained in veterans law who assist each VLJ review the facts of each case and write the decision, and a number of non-decision writing attorneys, professional and administrative staff to help execute the numerous other Board programs supporting the decision teams.

The Chairman, Vice Chairman, Deputy Vice Chairmen, and Chief Counsel are all members of the Board. However, the Chairman is prohibited by law from deciding appeals, unless he or she is sitting as part of a panel. In practice, however, rarely do any of the senior executives write a Board decision (outside of ruling on certain motions).

== Types of Appeals ==
=== Legacy Appeals ===
Legacy appeals involve decisions made before February 19, 2019, under the previous VA appeals process. Veterans and their representatives contest decisions by an Agency of Original Jurisdiction (AOJ) by filing a Notice of Disagreement (NOD). This is followed by a Statement of the Case (SOC) and a substantive appeal on a VA Form 9. The appeal process allows a continuous open record, enabling veterans to submit new evidence at any stage. However, this flexibility can prolong the process, as new evidence must be reviewed by the AOJ before Board consideration. If new evidence is submitted after certification to the Board, the appeal must be remanded to the AOJ, potentially delaying a final decision.

=== Post-AMA Appeal ===
The Veterans Appeals Improvement and Modernization Act of 2017 (AMA) introduced significant changes to the VA appeals process for decisions issued on or after February 19, 2019. The AMA aimed to streamline the appeals process by introducing three distinct appeal dockets at the Board and modifying the evidentiary record rules. This structure was designed to reduce the backlog by closing the record at specific times, addressing issues in the legacy system where veterans could add evidence at any time, often necessitating remands for AOJ review. The AMA provides veterans with three docket options for filing a Notice of Disagreement (NOD) directly with the Board:

- Direct Review Docket: The Board reviews the AOJ decision based solely on the evidence available at the initial decision. Veterans may not add new evidence but can submit written arguments.
- Evidence Submission Docket: Veterans may submit new and relevant evidence with the NOD or within 90 days after the appeal is docketed, and the Board will only consider evidence provided during this period.
- Hearing Docket: Veterans can request a hearing with a Veterans Law Judge (VLJ) and submit new evidence within 90 days following the hearing or if the hearing is waived. This option allows veterans to present their case directly to a VLJ and add new evidence.

=== Simultaneously Contested Appeals ===
While not a separate type of appeal, contested appeals differ from the typal appeal, because they involve multiple parties with competing interests in the same VA benefits, such as apportionment of benefits among dependents, recognition of survivors for Dependency and Indemnity Compensation (DIC), or disputes over attorney fees and expenses. Contested claim decision review options are limited to Board review, and appeals must be initiated within sixty days of the AOJ decision. Once the Board gains jurisdiction, the appeal is placed on the docket that provides the most advantageous review for all parties. For instance, if one party selects Direct Review and another selects Evidence Submission, the appeal will be placed on the Evidence Submission docket. All parties are given the opportunity to participate, including attending hearings and submitting evidence.

== Appellate Procedure ==
=== Board Hearings ===
If a hearing is requested, the Board schedules the veteran and their representative for a hearing, based on the type of hearing they requested when initiating the appeal. Hearings can be held either at the Board's offices in Washington, DC, virtually, using a internet-connected device with a camera such as a computer, tablet device, or mobile phone. or via videoconference from a VA Regional Office or other VA location. In the case of legacy appeals, in-person appeals can also be held by a Travel Board hearing, which involves the VLJ holding the hearing at a local VA Regional Office. During the hearing, the veteran is placed under oath, and then the veteran and their representative provide opening statements, testimony, and evidence to support their case. The Veterans Law Judge (VLJ) may ask clarifying questions to better understand the case, but generally, the hearing is considered non-adversarial. The hearing is recorded, and the transcript becomes part of the evidentiary record.

=== Remands ===
If the Board determines that additional evidence or further development is needed, it can remand the case to the AOJ. A remand is not a final decision but a directive for further action, such as gathering additional evidence, obtaining a medical opinion, or addressing procedural errors. In legacy appeals, a remand directs the AOJ to complete specific development actions such as gathering new evidence or obtaining medical opinions. The Board may remand a legacy appeal if there is a procedural defect, such as a failure to provide a required notice or assistance, or if further development of evidence is necessary. The AOJ must complete the specified actions and readjudicate the claim. If the readjudication does not fully grant the issue on appeal, the appeal must return to the Board for further review. Under the AMA, a remand returns jurisdiction of the claim to the AOJ to issue a new decision consistent with the remand directives. Under the AMA appeals can only be remanded for limited reasons such as the AOJ's failure to fulfill its duty to assist the veteran in obtaining evidence or if the Board identifies an error that occurred prior to the AOJ decision under appeal. Once the AOJ completes the required actions and issues a new decision, the veteran can appeal again if they are not satisfied with the outcome.

=== Board Decisions ===
Once all applicable evidence is reviewed, the Board issues a written decision outlining the findings of fact and conclusions of law on the issues presented, and an order either granting or denying the benefits sought. These decisions are considered final determinations of fact and law on the issues, binding unless appealed or reconsidered. They are non-precedential, meaning they apply only to the specific case and do not establish or modify VA policies. Once the Board issues its final decision, an appellant can file one of three post-decisional motions to request the Board review its decision. The motions include a Motion to Vacate, which requests nullification of the decision due to procedural errors or false evidence; a Motion for Reconsideration, which asks the Board to re-examine its decision based on significant factual or legal mistakes or new evidence; and a Motion for Revision based on Clear and Unmistakable Error (CUE), which seeks to correct undebatable errors that impacted the outcome. These motions must meet specific criteria and can only be sought if the Board decision if the appellant has not sought judicial review of the claim.

== Judicial Review ==
Pursuant to 38 U.S.C. § 7252, exclusive jurisdiction for the review of Board decisions is vested in the United States Court of Appeals for Veterans Claims. The appellant must file a Notice of Appeal directly with CAVC within 120 days from the date of the BVA's decision in order to seek review of the Board's decision. Only a veteran can file an appeal to the CAVC; the secretary is prohibited by law from doing so. CAVC reviews are limited to determining whether the Board's decision adheres to applicable veterans' law, federal administrative procedures, and/or the Constitution. Findings of fact by the Board are not reviewable unless clearly erroneous.

The court may then affirm, reverse, remand, or modify the BVA's decision based on its findings. Decisions from CAVC can then be appealed to the United States Court of Appeals for the Federal Circuit if a disagreement over a question of law remains. The final avenue for appeal is to the Supreme Court of the United States, which may review the case if it presents a significant legal issue.

== Challenges ==
The BVA faces several challenges, including managing the increasing volume and complexity of appeals, reducing wait times, and addressing backlogs. The implementation of new legislative measures, such as the PACT Act has significantly impacted the Board's workload, as Veterans continue to seek appellate review of claims which may now be eligible for compensation, of which a possible 86,000 new appeals could be initiated at the Board. Additionally, following the CAVC decision in Beaudette v. McDonough, which made VHA eligibility decisions on benefits under the Program of Comprehensive Assistance for Family Caregivers (PCAFC) eligible for Board review, the Board's caseload and wait times have increased.

=== Legacy Backlog ===
Although the period in which to initiate a new legacy appeal expired on February 19, 2020 (one year after the effective date of the Appeals Modernization Act), a persistent backlog of legacy appeals remains pending review by the Board. Although the VA established a goal to complete all Legacy appeals by the end of calendar year 2022, VA as a whole had an inventory of 59,364 legacy appeals awaiting review at the end of CY 2023, with 40% of those (23,967) under Board jurisdiction. The Board attributes this to the required continual remands of these appeals, with over 53% of appeals having to be remanded a second time, and 27% being remanded three or more times. Additionally, with the Beaudette decision establishing Board eligibility for review of Caregiver claims, the number of legacy VHA appeals for PCAFC is expected to increase as well, as decisions issued pre-2019 which were not previously eligible for review at the Board now become eligible, and appellants can seek review of those older decisions under the legacy system. Despite that, the Board has prioritized the completion of their legacy appeals inventory, with a goal to reduce that number to "functional zero" during FY 2024 and has reduced that number nearly 54% through the second quarter of FY 2024

=== AMA Wait Times ===
Upon implementation of the AMA, the Board established specific processing time targets for appeals on each of the dockets: 365 days for Direct docket appeals, 550 days for Evidence docket appeals, and 730 days for Hearing docket appeals. Despite these goals, wait times remain outside these targets, especially for appeals where hearings are requested, as the average time to complete an AMA decision was 866 days for Direct Review appeals, 1,056 days for Evidence Submission appeals, and 1,089 days for appeals on the Hearing docket through the end of Quarter 3 of FY2024 (Apr - Jun 2024). The Board states that it although those numbers are outside the expected timelines, those numbers have peaked and begun to fall, with a possible realization of those goal times sometime during FY 2025, as the legacy inventory continues to fall, and more resources are devoted to adjudicating AMA appeals.

== See also ==
- United States Court of Appeals for Veterans Claims
- Veterans Benefits Administration
- Veterans Health Administration
- National Cemetery Administration
