= Order of precedence in the United States =

Relative preeminence of officials for ceremonial purposes

The United States order of precedence is an advisory document maintained by the Ceremonials Division of the Office of the Chief of Protocol of the United States which lists the ceremonial order, or relative preeminence, for domestic and foreign government officials (military and civilian) at diplomatic, ceremonial, and social events within the United States and abroad. The list is used to mitigate miscommunication and embarrassment in diplomacy, and offer a distinct and concrete spectrum of preeminence for ceremonies. Often the document is used to advise diplomatic and ceremonial event planners on seating charts and order of introduction. Former presidents, vice presidents, first ladies, second ladies, and secretaries of state and retired Supreme Court justices are also included in the list.

The order is established by the president, through the Office of the Chief of Staff, and is maintained by the State Department's Office of the Chief of Protocol. It is only used to indicate ceremonial protocol and has no legal standing; it does not reflect the presidential line of succession or the co-equal status of the branches of government under the Constitution. The Office of the Chief of Protocol published an updated order of precedence in February 2022.

== List ==
Except as otherwise noted, positions in the list are from the following source. Details are accurate as of November 9, 2026.

1. President of the United States (Note: Spouses of the president of the United States, the vice president of the United States, governors in their own state and mayors in their own cities are afforded the same rank and courtesy that accompanies their spouses' positions at official functions. Spouses of other federal, state, or municipal government officials are accorded the same rank as the principal at official functions when they are attending together, and they are seated accordingly. This seating courtesy is the only ranking a spouse without title receives in the United States, unless the spouse himself or herself holds a separate position on the order of precedence.) (Donald Trump)
2. Vice President of the United States (JD Vance)
3. Governor of a state – when in own state
4. Speaker of the House of Representatives (Mike Johnson)
5. Chief Justice of the United States (John Roberts)
6. Former presidents of the United States or their widows/widowers in italics; if necessary (by seniority of assuming office):
  1. Bill Clinton (January 20, 1993 – January 20, 2001)
  2. George W. Bush (January 20, 2001 – January 20, 2009)
  3. Barack Obama (January 20, 2009 – January 20, 2017)
  4. Joe Biden (January 20, 2021 – January 20, 2025)
7. Former vice presidents of the United States or their widows/widowers in italics; if necessary (by seniority of assuming office) (Note: Joe Biden, who served as vice president from 2009 to 2017, already appears above as a former president):
  1. Dan Quayle (January 20, 1989 – January 20, 1993)
  2. Al Gore (January 20, 1993 – January 20, 2001)
  3. Lynne Cheney (January 20, 2001 – January 20, 2009)
  4. Mike Pence (January 20, 2017 – January 20, 2021)
  5. Kamala Harris (January 20, 2021 – January 20, 2025)
8. American ambassadors extraordinary and plenipotentiary to foreign governments – when at post
9. American ambassadors, permanent representatives or representatives to international organizations who hold chief of mission authority (Note: The American Ambassadors, Permanent Representatives or Representatives to international organizations with Chief of Mission authority include the following: U.S. Mission to the United Nations (USUN) – New York; U.S. Mission to the African Union (USAU) – Addis Ababa; U.S. Representative to the Organization for Security & Cooperation in Europe with the rank of Ambassador (OSCE) – Vienna; U.S. Mission to the Vienna Office of the United Nations (UNVIE) – Vienna; U.S. Mission to the North Atlantic Treaty Organization (USNATO) – Brussels; U.S. Representative to the Organization for Economic Cooperation and Development with the rank of Ambassador (USOECD) – Paris; U.S. Mission to the UN and Other International Organizations – Geneva; U.S. Mission to the European Union (USEU) – Brussels; U.S. Mission to the Association of Southeast Asian Nations (USASEAN) – Jakarta; U.S. Mission to the Organization of American States (USOAS) – Washington, D.C.) – when at post
10. American chargé d'affaires ad interim – when at post
11. Secretary of State (Marco Rubio)
12. President, United Nations General Assembly – when in session (Khalilur Rahman)
13. Secretary-General of the United Nations – when at the United Nations (António Guterres)
14. President, United Nations General Assembly – when not in session
15. Ambassadors extraordinary and plenipotentiary of foreign diplomatic missions to the United States (Note: Diplomatic missions refer to all bilateral missions and the delegations of the European Union and African Union.) (in order of presentation of credentials to the president of the United States)
16. Associate justices of the Supreme Court (ranked by date of appointment):
  1. Clarence Thomas (October 18, 1991)
  2. Samuel Alito (January 31, 2006)
  3. Sonia Sotomayor (August 8, 2009)
  4. Elena Kagan (August 7, 2010)
  5. Neil Gorsuch (April 8, 2017)
  6. Brett Kavanaugh (October 6, 2018)
  7. Amy Coney Barrett (October 27, 2020)
  8. Ketanji Brown Jackson (June 30, 2022)
17. Retired chief justices of the United States (ranked by date of appointment; currently none)
18. Retired associate justices of the Supreme Court, unless they resigned (ranked by date of appointment): (Note: See Associate Justice of the Supreme Court of the United States § Retired associate justices for more details about retirement of Associate Justices, as opposed to resignation.)
  1. Anthony Kennedy (February 18, 1988 – July 31, 2018)
  2. Stephen Breyer (August 3, 1994 – June 30, 2022)
19. The Cabinet (other than Secretary of State), ranked according to the date of establishment of the department, (Note: For the purposes of the Order of Precedence, any reference to "executive department" shall mean the Cabinet Departments led by the Cabinet Secretaries.) as added by the president, (Note: The President may make changes in their administration to the Cabinet-rank positions.) as follows:
  1. Secretary of the Treasury (Scott Bessent)
  2. Secretary of Defense (Pete Hegseth)
  3. Attorney General (Todd Blanche)
  4. Secretary of the Interior (Doug Burgum)
  5. Secretary of Agriculture (Brooke Rollins)
  6. Secretary of Commerce (Howard Lutnick)
  7. Secretary of Labor (Keith Sonderling)
  8. Secretary of Health and Human Services (Robert F. Kennedy Jr.)
  9. Secretary of Housing and Urban Development (Scott Turner)
  10. Secretary of Transportation (Sean Duffy)
  11. Secretary of Energy (Chris Wright)
  12. Secretary of Education (Linda McMahon)
  13. Secretary of Veterans Affairs (Doug Collins)
  14. Secretary of Homeland Security (Markwayne Mullin)
  15. White House chief of staff (Stephen Miller)
  16. Administrator, Environmental Protection Agency (Lee Zeldin)
  17. Director, Office of Management and Budget (Russell Vought)
  18. United States trade representative (Jamieson Greer)
  19. Ambassador to the United Nations (Mike Waltz)
  20. Administrator, Small Business Administration (Kelly Loeffler)
  21. Director of National Intelligence (Jay Clayton)
  22. Director of the Central Intelligence Agency (CIA) (John Ratcliffe)
20. President pro tempore of the U.S. Senate (Chuck Grassley)
21. Senate majority leader (John Thune)
22. Senate minority leader (Chuck Schumer)
23. Senate majority whip (John Barrasso)
24. Senate minority whip (Dick Durbin)
25. Senators (by length of service; if the same, by the state's date of admission into the Union or alphabetically by state)
26. Governors of states – when outside their own states (relative precedence among governors, all of whom are outside their own state, is determined by each state's date of admission into the Union or alphabetically by state)
  1. Governor of Delaware (Matt Meyer)
  2. Governor of Pennsylvania (Josh Shapiro)
  3. Governor of New Jersey (Mikie Sherrill)
  4. Governor of Georgia (Brian Kemp)
  5. Governor of Connecticut (Ned Lamont)
  6. Governor of Massachusetts (Maura Healey)
  7. Governor of Maryland (Wes Moore)
  8. Governor of South Carolina (Henry McMaster)
  9. Governor of New Hampshire (Kelly Ayotte)
  10. Governor of Virginia (Abigail Spanberger)
  11. Governor of New York (Kathy Hochul)
  12. Governor of North Carolina (Josh Stein)
  13. Governor of Rhode Island (Daniel McKee)
  14. Governor of Vermont (Phil Scott)
  15. Governor of Kentucky (Andy Beshear)
  16. Governor of Tennessee (Bill Lee)
  17. Governor of Ohio (Mike DeWine)
  18. Governor of Louisiana (Jeff Landry)
  19. Governor of Indiana (Mike Braun)
  20. Governor of Mississippi (Tate Reeves)
  21. Governor of Illinois (J. B. Pritzker)
  22. Governor of Alabama (Kay Ivey)
  23. Governor of Maine (Janet Mills)
  24. Governor of Missouri (Mike Kehoe)
  25. Governor of Arkansas (Sarah Huckabee Sanders)
  26. Governor of Michigan (Gretchen Whitmer)
  27. Governor of Florida (Ron DeSantis)
  28. Governor of Texas (Greg Abbott)
  29. Governor of Iowa (Kim Reynolds)
  30. Governor of Wisconsin (Tony Evers)
  31. Governor of California (Gavin Newsom)
  32. Governor of Minnesota (Tim Walz)
  33. Governor of Oregon (Tina Kotek)
  34. Governor of Kansas (Laura Kelly)
  35. Governor of West Virginia (Patrick Morrisey)
  36. Governor of Nevada (Joe Lombardo)
  37. Governor of Nebraska (Jim Pillen)
  38. Governor of Colorado (Jared Polis)
  39. Governor of North Dakota (Kelly Armstrong)
  40. Governor of South Dakota (Larry Rhoden)
  41. Governor of Montana (Greg Gianforte)
  42. Governor of Washington (Bob Ferguson)
  43. Governor of Idaho (Brad Little)
  44. Governor of Wyoming (Mark Gordon)
  45. Governor of Utah (Spencer Cox)
  46. Governor of Oklahoma (Kevin Stitt)
  47. Governor of New Mexico (Michelle Lujan Grisham)
  48. Governor of Arizona (Katie Hobbs)
  49. Governor of Alaska (Mike Dunleavy)
  50. Governor of Hawaii (Josh Green)
27. House majority leader (Steve Scalise)
28. House minority leader (Hakeem Jeffries)
29. House majority whip (Tom Emmer)
30. House minority whip (Katherine Clark)
31. Members of the House of Representatives (by length of service; if the same, by the states's date of admission into the Union or alphabetically by state)
32. Delegates or resident commissioners to the House of Representatives (non-voting members) from Territory of American Samoa, District of Columbia, Territory of Guam, Commonwealth of Puerto Rico, Commonwealth of the Northern Mariana Islands, and Virgin Islands of the United States (by length of service)
  1. Eleanor Holmes Norton of the District of Columbia (January 3, 1991)
  2. Amata Coleman Radewagen of American Samoa (January 3, 2015)
  3. Stacey Plaskett of the US Virgin Islands (January 3, 2015)
  4. James Moylan of Guam (January 3, 2023)
  5. Pablo Hernández Rivera of Puerto Rico (January 3, 2025)
  6. Kimberlyn King-Hinds of the Northern Mariana Islands (January 3, 2025)
33. Governors of Commonwealth of Puerto Rico, Territory of Guam, Territory of American Samoa, United States Virgin Islands, and the Commonwealth of the Northern Mariana Islands (ordered by territory's date of entering U.S. jurisdiction or alphabetically by territory):
  1. Governor of Puerto Rico (Jenniffer González-Colón)
  2. Governor of Guam (Lou Leon Guerrero)
  3. Governor of American Samoa (Pula Nikolao Pula)
  4. Governor of the US Virgin Islands (Albert Bryan)
  5. Governor of the Northern Mariana Islands (David M. Apatang)
34. Assistants to the president:
  1. National Security Advisor (Marco Rubio) (Note: Appears higher as Secretary of State)
  2. Counselors to the president (ranked by date of appointment):
    1. Peter Navarro (January 20, 2025)
  3. White House deputy chiefs of staff (ranked by date of appointment):
    1. Beau Harrison (January 20, 2025)
    2. Stephen Miller (January 20, 2025)
    3. Dan Scavino (January 20, 2025)
    4. Richard Walters (May 1, 2026)
  4. Chief of Staff to the spouse of the president (Hayley Harrison)
  5. Chief of Staff to the vice president (Nick Luna)
  6. Remaining assistants to the president or special presidential envoys who previously held Cabinet rank (ordered by date of appointment; excluding those already listed above)
    1. Steven Cheung (January 20, 2025)
    2. Joshua Fisher (January 20, 2025)
    3. Vince Haley (January 20, 2025)
    4. Kevin Hassett (January 20, 2025)
    5. Tom Homan (January 20, 2025)
    6. Michael Kratsios (January 20, 2025)
    7. Will Scharf (January 20, 2025)
    8. Steve Witkoff (January 20, 2025)
    9. Ross Worthington (January 20, 2025)
    10. Jarrod Agen (April 1, 2025)
    11. Meghan Bauer (November 21, 2025)
    12. Walker Barrett (December 31, 2025)
    13. Ben Moss (September 2, 2026)
    14. Katie Bailey (October 10, 2026)
35. Counselors or Senior Advisors to the President (ranked by date of appointment; excluding those already listed above):
  1. Massad Boulos (January 20, 2025)
36. Chair of the Council of Economic Advisers (Christopher Phelan)
37. Chair of the Council on Environmental Quality (Rachel McNitt) (Acting)
38. Presidential Science Advisor and Director of the Office of Science and Technology Policy (Michael Kratsios) (Note: Appears higher as an Assistant to the President)
39. Director of the Office of National Drug Control Policy (Sara A. Carter)
40. Chief of Protocol (Monica Crowley) – when with the president or for a White House event
41. Ambassadors from the United States to international organizations who do not hold Chief of Mission authority (when at post) (Note: The American Ambassadors, Permanent Representatives or Representatives to international organizations who do not hold Chief of Mission authority, and are given an Ambassador-rank only for the time served in the role, include the following: U.S. Representative to the Conference on Disarmament – Geneva; Representative to the International Civil Aviation Organization (ICAO) – Montreal; U.S. Representative to the UN Human Rights Council (UNHRC) – Geneva; U.S. Representative to the United Nations Educational, Scientific and Cultural Organization (UNESCO) – Paris; U.S. Representative to the Organisation for the Prohibition of Chemical Weapons (OPCW) – The Hague; U.S. Representative to the United Nations Agencies for Food and Agriculture (FAO) – Rome.)
42. Chargés d'affaires to the United States (ordered by assumption of office)
43. Former secretaries of state (ordered by term):
  1. James Baker (January 20, 1989 – August 23, 1992)
  2. Condoleezza Rice (January 26, 2005 – January 20, 2009)
  3. Hillary Clinton (January 21, 2009 – February 1, 2013) (Note: Hillary Clinton could appear above as a widowed former First Lady if her husband, former president Bill Clinton, dies)
  4. John Kerry (February 1, 2013 – January 20, 2017)
  5. Rex Tillerson (February 1, 2017 – March 31, 2018)
  6. Mike Pompeo (April 26, 2018 – January 20, 2021)
  7. Antony Blinken (January 26, 2021 – January 20, 2025)
44. Former members of the U.S. Cabinet (ordered by term, who do not already rank higher by virtue of another office)
  1. Carla Anderson Hills (March 10, 1975)
  2. F. David Mathews (August 8, 1975)
  3. John A. Knebel (November 4, 1976)
  4. W. Michael Blumenthal (January 23, 1977)
  5. Joseph A. Califano Jr. (January 25, 1977)
  6. Ray Marshall (January 27, 1977)
  7. John R. Block (January 23, 1981)
  8. Donald P. Hodel (November 5, 1982)
  9. Elizabeth Dole (February 7, 1983)
  10. William Bennett (February 6, 1985)
  11. John S. Herrington (February 7, 1985)
  12. Edwin Meese (February 25, 1985)
  13. James H. Burnley IV (December 2, 1987)
  14. Nicholas F. Brady (September 15, 1988)
  15. Samuel K. Skinner (February 6, 1989)
  16. Louis W. Sullivan (March 1, 1989)
  17. Lynn M. Martin (February 22, 1991)
  18. Lamar Alexander (March 22, 1991)
  19. William Barr (November 26, 1991)
  20. Andrew Card (February 24, 1992)
  21. Barbara Franklin (February 27, 1992)
  22. Federico Peña (January 21, 1993)
  23. Richard Riley (January 21, 1993)
  24. Bruce Babbitt (January 22, 1993)
  25. Henry Cisneros (January 22, 1993)
  26. Mike Espy (January 22, 1993)
  27. Hazel R. O'Leary (January 22, 1993)
  28. Robert Reich (January 22, 1993)
  29. Donna Shalala (January 22, 1993)
  30. William J. Perry (February 3, 1994)
  31. Robert Rubin (January 11, 1995)
  32. Dan Glickman (March 30, 1995)
  33. Mickey Kantor (April 12, 1996)
  34. William Cohen (January 24, 1997)
  35. Andrew Cuomo (January 29, 1997)
  36. William M. Daley (January 30, 1997)
  37. Rodney E. Slater (February 14, 1997)
  38. Lawrence Summers (July 2, 1999)
  39. Spencer Abraham (January 20, 2001)
  40. Donald Evans (January 20, 2001)
  41. Ann Veneman (January 20, 2001)
  42. Anthony Principi (January 23, 2001)
  43. Mel Martínez (January 24, 2001)
  44. Elaine Chao (January 29, 2001)
  45. Gale Norton (January 31, 2001)
  46. John Ashcroft (February 2, 2001)
  47. Tommy Thompson (February 2, 2001)
  48. Tom Ridge (October 8, 2001)
  49. John W. Snow (February 3, 2003)
  50. Alphonso Jackson (September 30, 2004)
  51. Margaret Spellings (January 20, 2005)
  52. Mike Johanns (January 21, 2005)
  53. Mike Leavitt (January 26, 2005)
  54. Jim Nicholson (January 26, 2005)
  55. Alberto Gonzales (February 3, 2005)
  56. Carlos Gutierrez (February 7, 2005)
  57. Michael Chertoff (February 15, 2005)
  58. Henry Paulson (July 10, 2006)
  59. Mary E. Peters (October 17, 2006)
  60. Robert Gates (December 18, 2006)
  61. Michael Mukasey (November 9, 2007)
  62. James Peake (December 20, 2007)
  63. Ed Schafer (January 28, 2008)
  64. Steve Preston (June 5, 2008)
  65. Ken Salazar (January 20, 2009)
  66. Tom Vilsack (January 20, 2009)
  67. Steven Chu (January 21, 2009)
  68. Arne Duncan (January 21, 2009)
  69. Eric Shinseki (January 21, 2009)
  70. Janet Napolitano (January 21, 2009)
  71. Ray LaHood (January 23, 2009)
  72. Shaun Donovan (January 26, 2009)
  73. Timothy Geithner (January 26, 2009)
  74. Eric Holder (February 3, 2009)
  75. Hilda Solis (February 24, 2009)
  76. Gary Locke (March 26, 2009)
  77. Kathleen Sebelius (April 28, 2009)
  78. Leon Panetta (July 1, 2011)
  79. Chuck Hagel (February 27, 2013)
  80. Jack Lew (February 28, 2013)
  81. Sally Jewell (April 2, 2013)
  82. Ernest Moniz (May 21, 2013)
  83. Penny Pritzker (June 26, 2013)
  84. Anthony Foxx (July 2, 2013)
  85. Tom Perez (July 23, 2013)
  86. Jeh Johnson (December 23, 2013)
  87. Sylvia Mathews Burwell (June 9, 2014)
  88. Julian Castro (July 28, 2014)
  89. Bob McDonald (July 30, 2014)
  90. Loretta Lynch (April 27, 2015)
  91. John King Jr. (September 14, 2016)
  92. John F. Kelly (January 20, 2017)
  93. Jim Mattis (January 20, 2017)
  94. Betsy DeVos (February 7, 2017)
  95. Jeff Sessions (February 9, 2017)
  96. Tom Price (February 10, 2017)
  97. Steven Mnuchin (February 13, 2017)
  98. David Shulkin (February 14, 2017)
  99. Wilbur Ross (February 28, 2017)
  100. Ben Carson (March 2, 2017)
  101. Rick Perry (March 2, 2017)
  102. Sonny Perdue (April 25, 2017)
  103. Alexander Acosta (April 28, 2017)
  104. Kirstjen Nielsen (December 6, 2017)
  105. Alex Azar (January 29, 2018)
  106. Robert Wilkie (July 30, 2018)
  107. David Bernhardt (April 11, 2019)
  108. Mark Esper (July 23, 2019)
  109. Eugene Scalia (September 30, 2019)
  110. Dan Brouillette (December 4, 2019)
  111. Lloyd Austin (January 22, 2021)
  112. Janet Yellen (January 26, 2021)
  113. Alejandro Mayorkas (February 2, 2021)
  114. Pete Buttigieg (February 3, 2021)
  115. Denis McDonough (February 9, 2021)
  116. Jennifer Granholm (February 25, 2021)
  117. Miguel Cardona (March 2, 2021)
  118. Gina Raimondo (March 3, 2021)
  119. Marcia Fudge (March 10, 2021)
  120. Merrick Garland (March 11, 2021)
  121. Deb Haaland (March 16, 2021)
  122. Xavier Becerra (March 19, 2021)
  123. Marty Walsh (March 23, 2021)
  124. Kristi Noem (January 25, 2025)
  125. Pam Bondi (February 5, 2025)
  126. Lori Chavez-DeRemer (March 11, 2025)
45. Former U.S. senators (ordered by leadership position, then by term; if same, then by date of statehood or ratification of the Constitution, who do not already rank higher by virtue of another office) (Note: If such as Lamar Alexander, U.S. Senator from Tennessee served from 2003 to 2021 and governor of Tennessee from 1979 to 1987, already appears above as a former U.S. Cabinet Member. John Kerry, U.S. Senator from Massachusetts served from 1985 to 2013, already appears above as a former U.S. Secretary of State.)
46. Former governors of the state or territory in which the event is held (ordered by term, who do not already rank higher by virtue of another office) (Note: If such as Tom Carper, governor of Delaware from 1993 to 2001, already appears above as a former U.S. Senator. Kristi Noem, governor of South Dakota from 2019 to 2025, already appears above as a former U.S. Cabinet Member.)
47. Former governors (of states other than the state in which the event is held, by date of statehood or ratification of the Constitution, who do not already rank higher by virtue of another office)
48. Former U.S. representatives (ordered by leadership position, then by term; if same, then by date of statehood or ratification of the Constitution, who do not already rank higher by virtue of another office) (Note: If such as Mike Espy, U.S. Congressman from Mississippi served from 1987 to 1993, already appears above as a former U.S. Cabinet Member. Bob Menendez, U.S. Congressman from New Jersey served from 1993 to 2006, already appears above as a former U.S. Senator.)
49. Deputy secretaries of executive departments (in the order of the creation of the respective departments or presidential appointment as for Cabinet above):
  1. Deputy Secretary of State (Christopher Landau)
  2. Deputy Secretary of State for Management and Resources (Michael Rigas)
  3. Deputy Secretary of the Treasury (Francis Brooke)
  4. Deputy Secretary of Defense (Steve Feinberg)
  5. Deputy Attorney General (Trent McCotter) (Acting)
  6. Deputy Secretary of the Interior (Katharine MacGregor)
  7. Deputy Secretary of Agriculture (Stephen Vaden)
  8. Deputy Secretary of Commerce (Paul Dabbar)
  9. Deputy Secretary of Labor (Vacant)
  10. Deputy Secretary of Health and Human Services (Brian Christine) (Acting)
  11. Deputy Secretary of Housing and Urban Development (Andrew Hughes)
  12. Deputy Secretary of Transportation (Steven Bradbury)
  13. Deputy Secretary of Energy (James Danly)
  14. Deputy Secretary of Education (Nicholas Kent) (Acting)
  15. Deputy Secretary of Veterans Affairs (Paul Lawrence)
  16. Deputy Secretary of Homeland Security (Troy Edgar)
  17. Deputy Administrator of the Environmental Protection Agency (David Fotouhi)
  18. Deputy Director of the Office of Management and Budget (Hal Duncan)
  19. Principal Deputy Director of National Intelligence (Aaron Lukas)
  20. Deputy trade representatives:
    1. Joseph Barloon
    2. Bryan Switzer
    3. Jeff Goettman
  21. Deputy Ambassador to the United Nations (Tammy Bruce)
  22. Deputy Administrator of the Small Business Administration (Bill Briggs)
50. Secretaries of the military departments (by creation order of branch):
  1. Secretary of the Army (Adam Telle) (Acting)
  2. Secretary of the Navy (Hung Cao) (Acting)
  3. Secretary of the Air Force (Troy Meink)
51. Chairman of the Joint Chiefs of Staff (Dan Caine)
52. Chairman of the Federal Reserve (Kevin Warsh)
53. Commissioner of the Social Security Administration (Frank Bisignano)
54. Heads of independent federal agencies at Level II of the Executive Schedule (ordered by agency creation date, if same, then by term)
  1. Director of the National Science Foundation (Vacant)
  2. Administrator of the National Aeronautics and Space Administration (Jared Isaacman)
  3. Administrator of the United States Agency for International Development (Eric Ueland) (Acting)
  4. Chairman of the Administrative Conference of the United States (Vacant)
  5. Chairman of the Nuclear Regulatory Commission (Ho Nieh)
  6. Director of the United States Office of Personnel Management (Scott Kupor)
  7. Chief Executive Officer of the Millennium Challenge Corporation (Vacant)
  8. Director of the Consumer Financial Protection Bureau (Mark Paoletta) (Acting)
  9. CEO of the U.S. International Development Finance Corporation (Benjamin Black)
55. Vice-chair and governors of the Federal Reserve (by length of service)
  1. Jerome Powell
  2. Michelle Bowman
  3. Christopher Waller
  4. Lisa Cook
  5. Philip Jefferson
  6. Michael Barr
56. Deputy Commissioner of the Social Security Administration (Arjun Mody)
57. Deputy Director of the Central Intelligence Agency (Michael Ellis)
58. Principal Deputy Director of the Office of National Drug Control Policy (Debbie Seguin) (Acting)
59. Director of the National Counterterrorism Center (Joe Weirsky) (Acting)
60. Deputy heads of independent federal agencies at Level II of the Executive Schedule (ordered by agency creation date, if same, then by term; currently, no such positions exist other than those already listed above)
61. Under secretaries of state and departmental positions of equivalent rank (ordered by departmental line of succession)
  1. Under Secretary of State for Political Affairs (Allison Hooker)
  2. Under Secretary of State for Management (Jason S. Evans)
  3. Remaining under secretaries of state, ordered by date of appointment:
    1. Under Secretary of State for Arms Control and International Security Affairs (Thomas G. DiNanno) (October 10, 2025)
    2. Under Secretary of State for Public Diplomacy and Public Affairs (Sarah Rogers) (October 10, 2025)
    3. Under Secretary of State for Economic Growth, Energy, and the Environment (Jacob Helberg) (October 16, 2025)
    4. Counselor of the United States Department of State (Daniel Holler) (May 26, 2026)
    5. Under Secretary of State for Civilian Security, Democracy, and Human Rights (Andrew Veprek) (August 28, 2026) (Acting) (as Under Secretary of State for Foreign Assistance, Humanitarian Affairs, and Religious Freedom)
62. Under secretaries of executive departments and departmental positions of equivalent rank, Treasurer of the United States, associate attorneys general, and Solicitor General (ordered as Cabinet above and then by departmental line of succession)
  1. Department of the Treasury (by date of appointment)
    1. Treasurer of the United States (Brandon Beach)
    2. Under Secretary of the Treasury for Domestic Finance (Jonathan McKernan)
    3. Under Secretary of the Treasury for International Affairs (Jonathan Greenstein) (Acting)
    4. Under Secretary of the Treasury for Terrorism and Financial Intelligence (Gene Lange) (Acting)
  2. Department of Defense
    1. Under Secretary of Defense for Policy (Elbridge Colby)
    2. Under Secretary of Defense for Intelligence and Security (Bradley Hansell)
    3. Under Secretary of Defense for Acquisition and Sustainment (Michael Duffey)
    4. Under Secretary of Defense for Research and Engineering (Emil Michael)
    5. Under Secretary of Defense (Comptroller) (Jules W. Hurst III)
    6. Under Secretary of Defense for Personnel and Readiness (Anthony Tata)
  3. Associate Attorney General (Stanley Woodward Jr.)
  4. Solicitor General (D. John Sauer)
  5. Department of Agriculture
    1. Under Secretary of Agriculture for Farm Production and Conservation (Richard Fordyce)
    2. Under Secretary of Agriculture for Food, Nutrition, and Consumer Services (Kumar Chandran) (Acting)
    3. Under Secretary of Agriculture for Natural Resources and Environment (Michael Boren)
    4. Under Secretary of Agriculture for Research, Education, and Economics (Scott Hutchins)
    5. Under Secretary of Agriculture for Rural Development (Glen R. Smith)
    6. Under Secretary of Agriculture for Food Safety (Mindy Brashears)
    7. Under Secretary of Agriculture for Marketing and Regulatory Programs (Dudley Hoskins)
    8. Under Secretary of Agriculture for Trade and Foreign Agricultural Affairs (Luke J. Lindberg)
  6. Department of Commerce
    1. Under Secretary of Commerce for International Trade and head of the International Trade Administration (William Kimmitt)
    2. Under Secretary of Commerce for Economic Affairs (Joyce Meyer)
    3. Under Secretary of Commerce for Standards and Technology and Director of the National Institute of Standards and Technology (Arvind Raman)
    4. Under Secretary of Commerce for Oceans and Atmosphere and Administrator of the National Oceanic and Atmospheric Administration (Neil Jacobs)
    5. Under Secretary of Commerce for Industry and Security (Jeffrey I. Kessler)
    6. Under Secretary of Commerce for Intellectual Property and Director of the United States Patent and Trademark Office (John A. Squires)
  7. Under Secretary of Transportation for Policy (Ryan McCormack)
  8. Department of Energy
    1. Under Secretary of Energy for Infrastructure (Kyle Haustveit)
    2. Under Secretary of Energy for Nuclear Security and Administrator of the National Nuclear Security Administration (Brandon Williams)
    3. Under Secretary of Energy for Science and Innovation (Darío Gil)
  9. Under Secretary of Education (Nicholas Kent)
  10. Department of Veterans Affairs
    1. Under Secretary of Veterans Affairs for Health (John Figueroa) (Acting)
    2. Under Secretary of Veterans Affairs for Benefits (Margarita Devlin) (Acting)
    3. Under Secretary of Veterans Affairs for Memorial Affairs (Sam Brown)
  11. Department of Homeland Security
    1. Under Secretary of Homeland Security for Management (Brian J. Cavanaugh) (Acting)
    2. Under Secretary of Homeland Security for Intelligence and Analysis (Matthew Kozma)
    3. Under Secretary of Homeland Security for Science and Technology (Pedro Allende)
    4. Under Secretary of Homeland Security for Strategy, Policy, and Plans (Robert Law)
63. Heads of federal departmental agencies (ordered as Cabinet above and then as by departmental line of succession). This includes the directors of the Federal Bureau of Investigation, the U.S. Secret Service, the Federal Aviation Administration, and Customs and Border Protection, and the State Department Director of Foreign Assistance.
64. Former chairs of the Joint Chiefs of Staff (ordered by term)
  1. Hugh Shelton (October 1, 1997 – September 30, 2001)
  2. Richard Myers (October 1, 2001 – September 30, 2005)
  3. Peter Pace (October 1, 2005 – September 30, 2007)
  4. Michael Mullen (October 1, 2007 – September 30, 2011)
  5. Martin Dempsey (October 1, 2011 – September 30, 2015)
  6. Joseph Dunford (October 1, 2015 – September 30, 2019)
  7. Mark Milley (October 1, 2019 – September 30, 2023)
  8. Charles Q. Brown Jr. (October 1, 2023 – February 21, 2025)
65. Vice Chairman of the Joint Chiefs of Staff (Christopher J. Mahoney)
66. Joint chiefs of staff (ordered by date of appointment):
  1. Chief of Space Operations (B. Chance Saltzman) (November 2, 2022)
  2. Commandant of the Marine Corps (Eric M. Smith) (September 22, 2023)
  3. Chief of Naval Operations (Daryl L. Caudle) (August 25, 2025)
  4. Chief of Staff of the Air Force (Kenneth S. Wilsbach) (November 3, 2025)
  5. Chief of Staff of the Army (Christopher C. LaNeve) (April 2, 2026) (Acting)
67. Chief of the National Guard Bureau (Steven S. Nordhaus)
68. Commandant of the Coast Guard (Kevin E. Lunday)
69. Combatant commanders of the Unified Combatant Commands of four-star grade (ordered by date of appointment):
  1. Space Command (Stephen N. Whiting) (January 10, 2024)
  2. Northern Command (Gregory M. Guillot) (February 5, 2024)
  3. Indo-Pacific Command (Samuel J. Paparo Jr.) (May 3, 2024)
  4. Transportation Command (Randall Reed) (October 4, 2024)
  5. European Command (Alexus G. Grynkewich) (July 1, 2025)
  6. Central Command (C. Bradford Cooper II) (August 8, 2025)
  7. Africa Command (Dagvin R. M. Anderson) (August 15, 2025)
  8. Special Operations Command (Frank M. Bradley) (October 3, 2025)
  9. Strategic Command (Richard A. Correll) (December 5, 2025)
  10. Southern Command (Francis L. Donovan) (February 5, 2026)
  11. Cyber Command (Joshua Rudd) (March 16, 2026)
70. Heads of independent federal agencies at Level III of the Executive Schedule (ordered by agency creation date, if same, then by term)
  1. U.S. Commissioner of the International Boundary and Water Commission (William C. McIntosh)
  2. Chair of the Federal Trade Commission (Andrew N. Ferguson)
  3. Chair of the International Trade Commission (Brett W. Doyle)
  4. Chair of the Farm Credit Administration (Jeffery S. Hall)
  5. President of the Export-Import Bank of the United States (John Jovanovic)
  6. Chair of the Securities and Exchange Commission (Paul S. Atkins)
  7. Chair of the Federal Communications Commission (Brendan Carr)
  8. Archivist of the United States (Bradford Wilson)
  9. Chair of the National Mediation Board (Loren Sweatt)
  10. Chair of the National Labor Relations Board (James Murphy)
  11. Chair of the Railroad Retirement Board (Erhard R. Chorlé)
  12. Director of the Federal Mediation and Conciliation Service (Anna Davis) (Acting)
  13. Administrator of the General Services Administration (Edward Forst)
  14. Director of the Peace Corps (Christopher Landau) (Acting)
  15. Chair of the Federal Maritime Commission (Laura DiBella)
  16. Federal co-chair of the Appalachian Regional Commission (Gayle Conelly Manchin)
  17. Chair of the Equal Employment Opportunity Commission (Andrea R. Lucas)
  18. Director of the National Foundation on the Arts and the Humanities
  19. Chair of the National Endowment for the Arts (Mary Anne Carter)
  20. Chair of the National Endowment for the Humanities (William English) (Acting)
  21. Chair of the National Transportation Safety Board (Jennifer Homendy)
  22. Chair of the National Credit Union Administration (John Crews)
  23. Chair of the Occupational Safety and Health Review Commission (Jonathan Snare)
  24. Chair of the Consumer Product Safety Commission (Peter Feldman) (Acting)
  25. Director of the Pension Benefit Guaranty Corporation (Janet Dhillon)
  26. Chair of the Commodity Futures Trading Commission (Michael Selig)
  27. Chair of the Federal Energy Regulatory Commission (Laura Swett)
  28. Chair of the Federal Mine Safety and Health Review Commission (Marco M. Rajkovich, Jr.)
  29. Director of the Office of Government Ethics (Keith Sonderling) (Acting)
  30. Chair of the Merit Systems Protection Board (James Woodruff II)
  31. Chair of the Federal Retirement Thrift Investment Board (Michael F. Gerber)
  32. Chair of the Defense Nuclear Facilities Safety Board (Patricia L. Lee)
  33. Chief executive officer of AmeriCorps (Jennifer Bastress Tahmasebi) (Acting)
  34. Federal co-chair of the Northern Border Regional Commission (Chris Saunders)
71. Deputy heads of independent federal agencies at Level III of the Executive Schedule (ordered by agency creation date, if same, then by term)
  1. Deputy Director of the National Science Foundation (vacant)
  2. Deputy Administrator of NASA (Matthew P. Anderson)
  3. Deputy Administrator of the United States Agency for International Development (vacant)
  4. Commissioners of the Nuclear Regulatory Commission (ranked by date of appointment)
    1. Bradley Crowell (August 26, 2022)
    2. Matthew Marzano (January 8, 2025)
    3. David A. Wright (August 1, 2025)
    4. Doug W. Weaver (December 22, 2025)
  5. Deputy Director of the Office of Personnel Management (vacant)
  6. Vice chair of the Defense Nuclear Facilities Safety Board (vacant)
  7. Other members of the Defense Nuclear Facilities Safety Board (all vacant)
  8. Deputy Chief Executive Officer of the U.S. International Development Finance Corporation (vacant)
72. Postmaster General (David Steiner)
73. Lieutenant governor (of the state in which the event is held)
74. Mayor (of the city in which the event is held)
75. Heads of international organizations when not at post (ranked by date of establishment)
76. Ambassadors or permanent representatives of foreign governments accredited to international organizations headquartered in the United States
77. Ambassadors from the United States to foreign governments (on official business in the United States or another country)
78. Chief of Protocol (when at the Department of State or at events outside the White House, otherwise appears above)
79. Ambassadors from the United States to international organizations who hold Chief of Mission authority (on official business in the United States or another country)
80. Ambassadors from the United States to international organizations who do not hold Chief of Mission authority (on official business in the United States or another country)
81. Career ambassadors
82. National Security Council Chief of Staff and Executive Secretary (Catherine Keller)
83. Chief of Staff to the Spouse of the Vice President (Shannon Fisher)
84. Deputy Assistants to the President (ordered by date of appointment)
85. Executive Secretary of the National Space Council (Vacant)
86. Chief judges and circuit judges of the United States Courts of Appeals (by length of service)
87. Chief judges and district judges of the United States District Courts (by length of service)
88. Chief Judge and judges of the United States Court of Appeals for the Armed Forces (by length of service)
  1. Kevin A. Ohlson (November 1, 2013)
  2. John E. Sparks (April 19, 2016)
  3. Gregory E. Maggs (January 29, 2018)
  4. Liam P. Hardy (December 8, 2020)
  5. M. Tia Johnson (January 3, 2023)
89. Chief Judge and judges of the United States Court of Appeals for Veterans Claims (by length of service)
  1. Coral Wong Pietsch (June 28, 2012)
  2. Michael P. Allen (August 9, 2017)
  3. Amanda L. Meredith (August 9, 2017)
  4. Joseph L. Toth (August 9, 2017)
  5. Joseph L. Falvey Jr. (May 14, 2018)
  6. Scott J. Laurer (August 2020)
  7. Grant C. Jaquith (September 1, 2020)
  8. 3 seats vacant
90. Chief Judge and judges of the United States Tax Court (by length of service)
91. Chargés d'affaires from the United States (ordered by assumption of office)
92. Under secretaries of the Army, Navy, and Air Force (ordered by date of appointment)
  1. Under Secretary of the Air Force (Matthew Lohmeier) (July 25, 2025)
  2. Under Secretary of the Army (Michael Obadal) (September 22, 2025)
  3. Under Secretary of the Navy (Hung Cao) (October 3, 2025)
93. Assistant secretaries (ordered as Cabinet above and then as by departmental line of succession)
94. Chiefs of staff to heads of executive departments (ordered as Cabinet above and then as by departmental line of succession)
95. Ambassadors-at-large (ordered as Cabinet above and then as by departmental line of succession)
96. Special envoys/representatives (ordered as Cabinet above and then as by departmental line of succession)
97. Assistant attorneys general (ordered by departmental line of succession)
98. White House Social Secretary (Vacant)
99. Senior directors of the National Security Council
100. Legal advisers of executive departments (ordered as Cabinet above and then as by departmental line of succession)
101. Special assistants to the president (ranked by date of appointment)
102. Heads of independent federal agencies at Level IV of the Executive Schedule (ordered by agency creation date, if same, then by term)
  1. Director of the Selective Service System (Craig T. Brown) (Acting)
  2. Chair of the Federal Deposit Insurance Corporation (Travis Hill)
  3. Chair of the United States Commission on Civil Rights (Rochelle Mercedes Garza)
  4. Chair of the Postal Regulatory Commission (Vacant)
  5. President of the Inter-American Foundation (Sara Aviel)
  6. Chair of the Federal Election Commission (Shana M. Broussard)
  7. Chair of the Federal Labor Relations Authority (Colleen Kiko)
  8. Special Counsel of the Office of Special Counsel (Jamieson Greer) (Acting)
  9. Director of the Court Services and Offender Supervision Agency (Marcus Hodges) (Acting)
  10. Chair of the Chemical Safety Board (Steve Owens)
  11. CEO of the Broadcasting Board of Governors and Director of the International Broadcasting Bureau (Michael Rigas) (Acting)
  12. Chair of the Election Assistance Commission (Vacant)
103. Deputy Director of the Federal Bureau of Investigation (Andrew Bailey), (Christopher Raia)
104. Deputy heads of independent federal agencies at Level IV of the Executive Schedule (ordered by agency creation date, if same, then by term)
  1. Commissioners of the Federal Trade Commission
    1. Mark Meador (April 16, 2025)
    2. 3 seats vacant
  2. Commissioners of the United States International Trade Commission
    1. Jason Kearns (April 2, 2018)
    2. Peter-Anthony Pappas (August 3, 2026)
    3. Bartholomew Thanhauser (August 17, 2026)
    4. David Foley Jr. (August 17, 2026)
    5. Samuel Negatu (September 2026)
  3. Members of the Farm Credit Administration Board
    1. 2 seats vacant
  4. Commissioners of the Securities and Exchange Commission
    1. Hester Peirce (January 11, 2018)
    2. Mark Uyeda (June 30, 2022)
    3. 2 seats vacant
  5. Members of the Board of Directors of the Federal Deposit Insurance Corporation
    1. 2 seats vacant
  6. Vice chair of the Export–Import Bank of the United States (James G. Burrows Jr.) (Acting)
  7. Members of the Board of Directors of the Export–Import Bank of the United States
    1. Spencer Bachus (May 8, 2019) (ranks higher as a former representative)
    2. 2 seats vacant
  8. Commissioners of the Federal Communications Commission
    1. Anna M. Gomez (September 25, 2023)
    2. Olivia Trusty (June 23, 2025)
    3. 2 seats vacant
  9. Members of the National Mediation Board
    1. Linda Puchala (May 21, 2009)
    2. 1 seat vacant
  10. Members of the National Labor Relations Board
    1. David Prouty (August 28, 2021)
    2. Scott Mayer (January 7, 2026)
    3. James Macy (August 17, 2026)
    4. 1 seat vacant
  11. Members of the Railroad Retirement Board
    1. Thomas R. Jayne (February 4, 2019)
    2. Johnathan Bragg (February 5, 2019)
  12. Vice chair of the United States Commission on Civil Rights (Victoria F. Nourse)
  13. Members of the United States Commission on Civil Rights
    1. Peter Kirsanow (December 2001)
    2. Stephen Gilchrist (May 2020)
    3. J. Christian Adams (August 13, 2020)
    4. Mondaire Jones (January 18, 2023)
    5. Glenn Magpantay (February 15, 2023)
    6. Sara Frankenstein (February 26, 2026)
  14. Deputy Director of the Peace Corps (vacant)
  15. Commissioners of the Federal Maritime Commission
    1. Rebecca F. Dye (November 14, 2002)
    2. Dan Maffei (June 30, 2016)
    3. Max Vekich (February 15, 2022)
    4. Robert Harvey (June 1, 2026)
  16. Commissioners of the Equal Employment Opportunity Commission
    1. Kalpana Kotagal (August 9, 2023)
    2. Brittany Panuccio (October 27, 2025)
    3. 2 seats vacant
  17. Vice chair of the National Transportation Safety Board (Michael Graham)
  18. Members of the National Transportation Safety Board
    1. Thomas B. Chapman (January 6, 2020)
    2. John DeLeeuw (March 16, 2026)
    3. 1 seat vacant
  19. Vice chair of the National Credit Union Administration (Vacant)
  20. Member of the National Credit Union Administration (Vacant)
  21. Vice chair of the Postal Regulatory Commission (Robert G. Taub)
  22. Commissioners of the Postal Regulatory Commission
    1. Ann C. Fisher (August 8, 2019)
    2. Ashley E. Poling (August 8, 2019)
    3. Thomas G. Day (October 12, 2023)
  23. Members of the Occupational Safety and Health Review Commission
    1. 2 seats vacant
  24. Commissioners of the Consumer Product Safety Commission
    1. Brien Lorenze (TBD)
    2. Karen Sessions (TBD)
    3. 2 seats vacant
  25. Commissioners of the Commodity Futures Trading Commission
    1. 4 seats vacant
  26. Commissioners of the Federal Energy Regulatory Commission
    1. David Rosner (June 17, 2024)
    2. Lindsay See (June 28, 2024)
    3. Judy Chang (July 15, 2024)
    4. David LaCerte (October 27, 2025)
  27. Commissioners of the Federal Mine Safety and Health Review Commission
    1. Mary Lu Jordan (October 11, 2022)
    2. Timothy J. Baker (October 11, 2022)
    3. 2 seats vacant
  28. Vice chair of the Merit Systems Protection Board (Henry Kerner)
  29. Member of the Merit Systems Protection Board (Vacant)
  30. Members of the Chemical Safety Board
    1. Sylvia E. Johnson (February 3, 2022)
    2. 3 seats vacant
  31. Vice chair of the Election Assistance Commission (Vacant)
  32. Commissioners of the Election Assistance Commission
    1. 2 seats vacant
105. Assistant administrators of the Environmental Protection Agency
106. Assistant administrators of the United States Agency for International Development
107. Assistant trade representatives
108. Associate administrators of the Small Business Administration
109. Comptroller General of the United States (Orice Williams Brown) (Acting)
110. Members of the Council of Economic Advisers (ranked alphabetically)
111. Members of the Council on Environmental Quality (ranked alphabetically)
112. American ambassadors-designate (in the United States)
113. Mayors of cities in U.S. states (when not in own city; if multiple mayors present, rank by length of service)
114. Mayor of the District of Columbia (Muriel Bowser) (when not in own city)
115. Mayors of cities in U.S. territories (when not in own city)
116. Vice chiefs of staff (ordered by date of appointment):
  1. Vice Chief of Naval Operations (James Kilby) (January 5, 2024)
  2. Vice Chief of Space Operations (Shawn Bratton) (August 1, 2025)
  3. Assistant Commandant of the Marine Corps (Bradford Gering) (October 1, 2025)
  4. Vice Chief of Staff of the Army (Christopher LaNeve) (February 6, 2026)
  5. Vice Chief of Staff of the Air Force (John Lamontagne) (February 9, 2026)
117. Vice Chief of the National Guard Bureau (Thomas Carden)
118. Vice Commandant of the Coast Guard (Thomas G. Allan Jr.)
119. Assistant secretaries and general counsels of the Department of the Army, Navy, and Air Force (by date of appointment)
  1. Assistant Secretary of the Army (Civil Works) (Adam Telle) (August 5, 2025)
  2. Assistant Secretary of the Air Force (Manpower & Reserve Affairs) (Rich Anderson) (September 22, 2025)
  3. Assistant Secretary of the Army for Acquisition, Logistics, and Technology (Brent Ingraham) (September 22, 2025)
  4. Assistant Secretary of the Army (Installations, Energy and Environment) (Jordan Gillis) (October 6, 2025)
  5. Assistant Secretary of the Army (Financial Management and Comptroller) (Marc Andersen) (October 15, 2025)
  6. Assistant Secretary of the Air Force (Financial Management & Comptroller) (Philip Weinberg) (November 21, 2025)
  7. General Counsel of the Navy (David Denton Jr.) (December 19, 2025)
  8. General Counsel of the Army (Charles Young III) (December 22, 2025)
  9. Assistant Secretary of the Navy (Energy, Installations and Environment) (Brendan Rogers) (December 23, 2025)
  10. Assistant Secretary of the Navy (Manpower and Reserve Affairs) (Benjamin Kohlmann) (December 23, 2025)
  11. General Counsel of the Air Force (William Lane III) (January 2026)
  12. Assistant Secretary of the Air Force (Energy, Installations & Environment) (Michael Borders) (January 23, 2026)
  13. Assistant Secretary of the Air Force for Space Acquisition and Integration (Erich Hernandez-Baquero) (August 12, 2026)
  14. Assistant Secretary of the Navy (Financial Management and Comptroller) (Alaleh Jenkins) (January 20, 2025) (Acting)
  15. Assistant Secretary of the Air Force (Acquisition, Technology and Logistics) (William D. Bailey) (June 2, 2025) (Acting)
  16. Assistant Secretary of the Navy (Research, Development and Acquisition) (William Mahan) (May 26, 2026) (Acting)
  17. Assistant Secretary of the Army (Manpower and Reserve Affairs) (James Byrn) (August 12, 2026) (Acting)
120. Four-star military officers (in order of seniority: retired officers rank with but after active-duty officers)
121. Executive Secretary of the National Security Council (if not listed above)
122. Officers of the U.S. Senate:
  1. Chaplain (Barry Black)
  2. Secretary for the Majority (Robert M. Duncan)
  3. Secretary for the Minority (Gary B. Myrick)
  4. Secretary of the Senate (Jackie Barber)
  5. Sergeant at Arms (Jennifer Hemingway)
  6. Parliamentarian (Elizabeth MacDonough)
123. Officers of the U.S. House of Representatives:
  1. Chaplain (Margaret Kibben) (Acting)
  2. Chief Administrative Officer (Anne Dressendorfer Binsted) (Acting)
  3. Clerk of the House (Kevin McCumber)
  4. Sergeant at Arms (William McFarland)
124. Three-star military officers (in order of seniority: retired officers rank with but after active-duty officers)
125. State senators (when in own state; ranked by length of service, when the same, by alphabetical order by surname)
126. State representatives (when in own state; ranked by length of service, when the same, by alphabetical order by surname)
127. Former American ambassadors/chiefs of diplomatic missions (in order of presentation of credentials at first post, who do not already rank higher by virtue of another office)
128. Chairmen or heads of other federal boards, councils and commissions not previously listed
  1. U.S. chair of the International Joint Commission (Gerald Acker)
  2. Chair of the Commission of Fine Arts (Rodney Mims Cook Jr.)
  3. Chair of the American Battle Monuments Commission (Michael X. Garrett)
  4. Chair of the National Capital Planning Commission (Mark Paoletta)
  5. U.S. commissioner on the International Boundary Commission (J.T. Moore) (Acting)
  6. Chair of the Tennessee Valley Authority Board (Mitch Graves)
  7. Chair of the Interstate Commission on the Potomac River Basin (Willem Brakel)
  8. President of the Kennedy Center (Matt Floca)
  9. Federal representative on the Delaware River Basin Commission (Jesse T. Curry)
  10. Director of the President's Commission on White House Fellowships (Mary Sprowls)
  11. Chair of the Advisory Council on Historic Preservation (vacant)
  12. Chair of the board of trustees of the Woodrow Wilson International Center for Scholars (Joe Asher)
  13. Federal representative on the Susquehanna River Basin Commission (Jesse T. Curry)
  14. Chair of the U.S. AbilityOne Commission (Christina Brandt)
  15. Chair of the Marine Mammal Commission (Frances M. D. Gulland)
  16. Chair of the United States Access Board (Vacant)
  17. Executive secretary of the Harry S. Truman Scholarship Foundation (Terry Babcock-Lumish)
  18. Executive director of the Japan–United States Friendship Commission (Paige Cottingham-Streater)
  19. Chair of the National Council on Disability (Neil Romano) (Acting)
  20. Chair of the Holocaust Memorial Council (Jeffrey L. Miller)
  21. Chair of the board of directors of the African Development Foundation (vacant)
  22. Chair of the State Justice Institute (John D. Minton Jr.)
  23. Chair of the United States Arctic Research Commission (Thomas Dans)
  24. Chair of the board of directors of the United States Institute of Peace (Vacant)
  25. Chair of the United States Commission for the Preservation of America's Heritage Abroad (Lesley Weiss)
  26. Chair of the board of trustees of the James Madison Memorial Fellowship Foundation (Raymond M. Kethledge)
  27. Chair of the board of trustees of the Barry Goldwater Scholarship and Excellence in Education Foundation (John H. Yopp)
  28. Chair of the Nuclear Waste Technical Review Board (Peter Swift)
  29. Chief executive officer of the Armed Forces Retirement Home (Stephen T. Rippe)
  30. Chair of the Board of Trustees of the Morris K. Udall and Stewart L. Udall Foundation (Lisa Johnson Billy)
  31. Chair of the Utah Reclamation Mitigation Conservation Commission (Brad Barber)
  32. Chair of the Social Security Advisory Board (Amy Shuart)
  33. Chair of the Board of Directors of the Presidio Trust (Lynne Benioff)
  34. Chair of the Medicaid and CHIP Payment and Access Commission (Verlon Johnson)
  35. Chair of the Medicare Payment Advisory Commission (Amol S. Navathe)
  36. Chair of the United States Commission on International Religious Freedom (Asif Mahmood)
  37. Federal co-chair of the Delta Regional Authority (Corey Wiggins)
  38. Chair of the United States–China Economic and Security Review Commission (Randall Schriver)
  39. Chair of the Privacy and Civil Liberties Oversight Board (Vacant)
  40. Director of the Federal Housing Finance Agency (Bill Pulte)
129. Librarian of Congress (Robert Newlen/Todd Blanche) (Disputed) (Acting)
130. Secretary of the Smithsonian Institution (Lonnie Bunch)
131. Chairman of the American Red Cross (Gail J. McGovern)
132. Deputy chiefs of Protocol (ranked by date of appointment)
133. Minister-rank officials assigned to foreign bilateral diplomatic missions in Washington, D.C.
134. Deputy under secretaries of executive departments (according to date of establishment of the department; if more than one from a department, then as ranked within the department)
135. Principal deputy assistant secretaries of executive departments (according to date of establishment of the department; if more than one from a department, then as ranked within the department)
136. Deputy counsels of executive departments (according to date of establishment of the department; if more than one from a department, then as ranked within the department)
137. Two-star military officers (in order of seniority: retired officers rank with but after active-duty officers)
138. Deputy assistant secretaries of executive departments (according to date of establishment of the department; if more than one from a department, then as ranked within the department)
139. Deputy assistant secretaries and deputy general counsels of the Army, Navy and Air Force (by date of appointment)
140. Directors of the National Security Council
141. American consuls general to foreign governments (at post)
142. American deputy chiefs of mission (at post)
143. Deputy ambassadors or permanent representatives of foreign governments accredited to international organizations headquartered in the United States
144. Assistant chiefs of protocol
145. Minister-Counselor-rank officials assigned to foreign diplomatic missions
146. Chief Judge and judges, United States Court of International Trade (by seniority)
  1. Mark A. Barnett (May 28, 2013) (Chief Judge)
  2. Claire R. Kelly (May 28, 2013)
  3. Jennifer Choe-Groves (June 8, 2016)
  4. Gary Katzmann (September 15, 2016)
  5. Timothy M. Reif (August 8, 2019)
  6. M. Miller Baker (December 18, 2019)
  7. Lisa Wen-Jia Wang (February 7, 2024)
  8. Joseph A. Laroski (February 14, 2024)
  9. Kara Westercamp (August 10, 2026)
147. Chief Judge and associate judges, United States Court of Federal Claims (by seniority)
  1. Matthew H. Solomson (February 3, 2020) (Chief Judge)
  2. Elaine D. Kaplan (November 6, 2013)
  3. Richard Hertling (June 12, 2019)
  4. Ryan T. Holte (July 11, 2019)
  5. David A. Tapp (November 19, 2019)
  6. Eleni M. Roumel (February 24, 2020)
  7. Edward H. Meyers (October 20, 2020)
  8. Kathryn C. Davis (December 16, 2020)
  9. Zachary Somers (December 22, 2020)
  10. Thompson M. Dietz (December 22, 2020)
  11. Stephen S. Schwartz (December 22, 2020)
  12. Carolyn N. Lerner (February 17, 2022)
  13. Armando O. Bonilla (February 17, 2022)
  14. Molly Silfen (June 13, 2023)
  15. Philip Hadji (September 28, 2023)
  16. Robin M. Meriweather (August 8, 2024)
148. One-star military officers (in order of seniority: retired officers rank with but after active-duty officers)
149. Directors of offices of executive departments
150. Consuls general of foreign governments accredited to the United States
151. Counselor-rank officials assigned to foreign bilateral diplomatic missions in Washington, D.C.
152. Members of the Senior Executive Service not holding previously listed positions (by date of appointment, unless ranked differently as determined by the respective executive department)
153. Members of other federal boards, councils, and commissions not previously listed
  1. U.S. members of the International Joint Commission
    1. Lance Yohe (May 16, 2019)
    2. Robert Gioia (May 2, 2024)
  2. Secretary of the Commission of Fine Arts (Thomas Luebke)
  3. Secretary of the American Battle Monuments Commission (Robert J. Dalessandro) (Acting)
  4. Vice chair of the National Capital Planning Commission (Stuart Levenbach)
  5. Members of the Tennessee Valley Authority Board
    1. Bobby Klein (January 4, 2023)
    2. Wade White (January 4, 2023)
    3. Jeff Hagood (January 12, 2026)
    4. Arthur Graham (January 12, 2026)
    5. Randy Jones (January 12, 2026)
    6. 3 seats vacant
  6. Deputy Archivist of the United States (Vacant)
  7. Vice chair of the Interstate Commission on the Potomac River Basin (D. Lee Currey)
  8. Chief Operating Officer of the Federal Mediation and Conciliation Service (Julie Broussard Berko)
  9. Deputy Administrator of the General Services Administration (Mike Lynch)
  10. Commissioners of the President's Commission on White House Fellowships
  11. Alternate federal co-chairs on the Appalachian Regional Commission
  12. Vice chair of the Administrative Conference of the United States (Vacant)
  13. Vice chair of the Advisory Council on Historic Preservation (Travis Voyles)
  14. Members of the board of trustees of the Woodrow Wilson International Center for Scholars
  15. Alternate federal representatives on the Susquehanna River Basin Commission
    1. Francis B. Pera
    2. Amy M. Guise
  16. Vice chair of the U.S. AbilityOne Commission (Virna L. Winters)
  17. Vice chair of the Inter-American Foundation (Vacant)
  18. Commissioners of the Marine Mammal Commission
    1. Sue E. Moore
    2. Andy J. Read
  19. Vice chair of the United States Access Board (Tina Guenette)
  20. Vice chair of the Federal Election Commission (vacant)
  21. Deputy executive director of the Japan–United States Friendship Commission (Niharika Chibber Joe)
  22. Members of the Federal Labor Relations Authority
    1. Anne M. Wagner (July 30, 2024)
    2. Charles Arrington (January 6, 2026)
  23. Members of the National Council on Disability
  24. Vice chair of the Holocaust Memorial Council (Allan M. Holt)
  25. Vice chair of the board of directors of the African Development Foundation (vacant)
  26. Vice chair of the board of directors of the United States Institute of Peace (vacant)
  27. Members of the United States Commission for the Preservation of America's Heritage Abroad
  28. Members of the Federal Retirement Thrift Investment Board
  29. Members of the James Madison Memorial Fellowship Foundation (all vacant)
  30. Members of the board of trustees Barry Goldwater Scholarship and Excellence in Education Foundation
  31. Members of the Nuclear Waste Technical Review Board (all vacant)
  32. Chief operating officer of the Armed Forces Retirement Home (John S. RisCassi)
  33. Vice chair of the Board of Trustees of the Morris K. Udall and Stewart L. Udall Foundation (Tadd M. Johnson)
  34. Members of the Social Security Advisory Board
  35. Members of the Board of Directors of the Presidio Trust
  36. Vice chair of the Medicaid and CHIP Payment and Access Commission (Robert Duncan)
  37. Vice chair of the Medicare Payment Advisory Commission (Gregory P. Poulsen)
  38. Vice chair of the United States Commission on International Religious Freedom (CeCe Heil)
  39. Members of the International Broadcasting Advisory Board
    1. 5 seats vacant
  40. Vice chair of the United States–China Economic and Security Review Commission (Mike Kuiken)
  41. Member of the Privacy and Civil Liberties Oversight Board (Beth Ann Williams)
    1. 3 seats vacant
  42. Deputy Director of the Consumer Financial Protection Bureau (Zixta Martinez)
154. Desk officers of executive departments
155. First Secretary-rank officials assigned to foreign bilateral diplomatic missions in Washington, D.C.
