= Margaret Bartley =

American judge (born 1959)

Meg Bartley
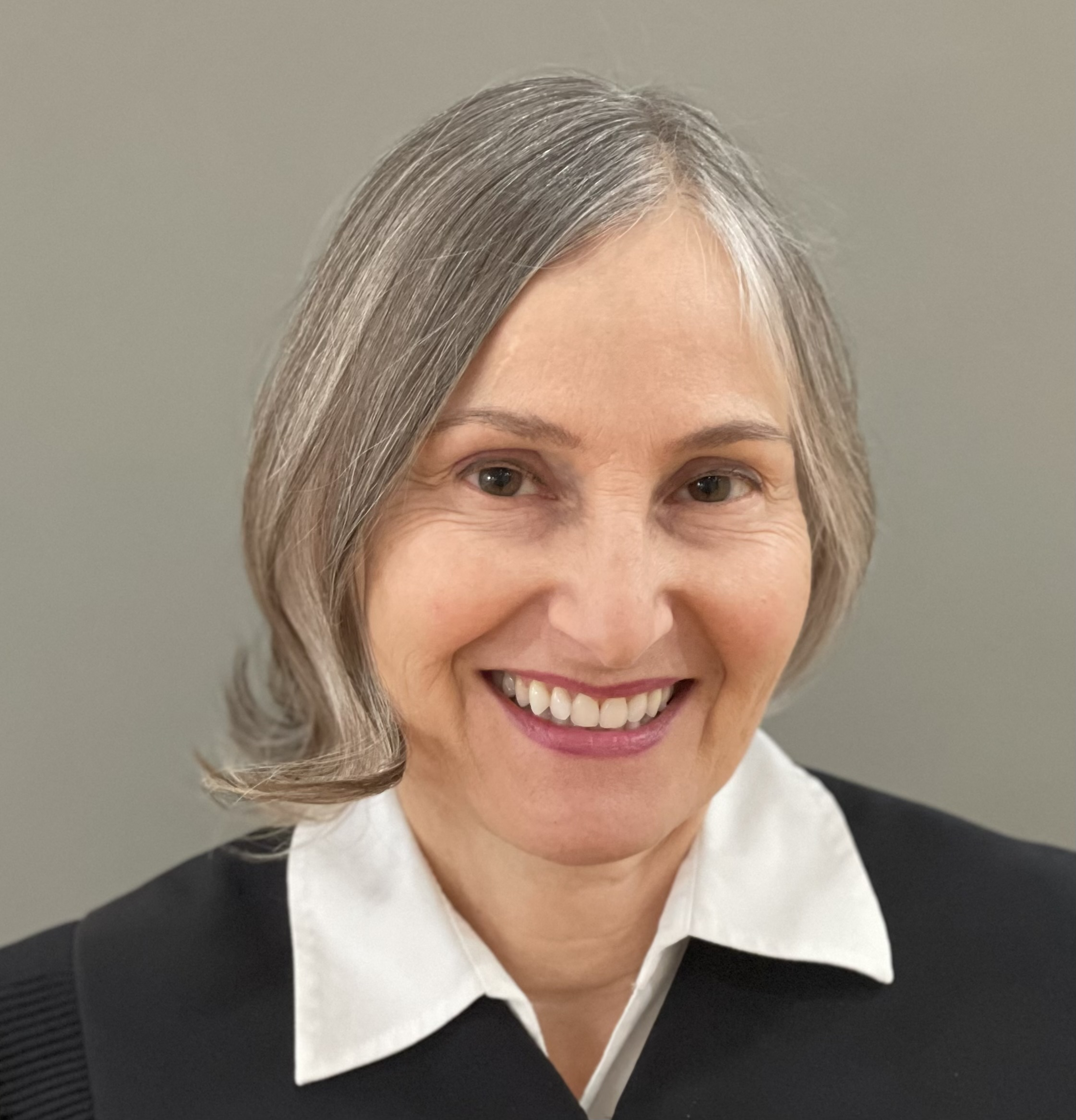

Senior Judge of the United States Court of Appeals for Veterans Claims
- Incumbent
- Assumed office 2026

Chief Judge of the United States Court of Appeals for Veterans Claims
- In office December 4, 2019 – September 19, 2024
- Preceded by: Robert N. Davis
- Succeeded by: Michael P. Allen

Judge of the United States Court of Appeals for Veterans Claims
- In office June 28, 2012 – 2026
- Appointed by: Barack Obama
- Preceded by: Seat established
- Succeeded by: Vacant

Personal details
- Born: Margaret Ciszek; December 21, 1959 (age 66) Pittsburgh, Pennsylvania, U.S.
- Party: Democratic
- Education: Pennsylvania State University, University Park (BA); American University (JD)

Margaret Bartley (née Ciszek; born December 21, 1959) is an American lawyer and judge from Maryland. She is a senior judge on the United States Court of Appeals for Veterans Claims.

== Education ==
Bartley received a Bachelor of Arts, cum laude, from Pennsylvania State University in 1981 and a Juris Doctor, cum laude, from the American University Washington College of Law in 1993.

== Career ==
From 1982 to 1983 she was an assistant to an account executive and later a receptionist at CIMA (Corporate Insurance Management) in Woodbridge, Virginia. In 1981 and 1983 she was morning manager and later a counter clerk at Debonair Cleaners in Washington, DC. In 1984 she was a kitchen manager and later a cook for Homespun, Inc. From 1985 to early 1986 she was an administrative assistant to Stanley Kaplan, an optometrist. From 1987 to 1988 she was a data entry clerk for the Committee in Solidarity with the People of El Salvador. From 1988 to 1989 she was an administrative assistant and later secretary to Kelly Temporary Services.

She was thereafter a law clerk to Judge Jonathan R. Steinberg of the Court of Appeals for Veterans Claims. She then worked as a staff attorney, and then senior staff attorney, for the National Veterans Legal Services Program, serving as editor in chief of that organization's quarterly report, and served as Director of Outreach and Education for the Veterans Consortium Pro Bono Program from 2005 to 2012. Since 2000, she has served as an assistant editor and later editor of the Veterans Advocate. From 1991 to 1993 she was a Dean's Fellow to Professor Nancy Polikoff at the Washington College of Law.

In 2012, Bartley was nominated by President Barack Obama to a seat on the Court of Appeals for Veterans Claims. She was confirmed by the United States Senate on May 24, 2012, on the same day as Coral Wong Pietsch. She became Chief Judge on December 4, 2019.

Legal offices
New seat	Judge of the United States Court of Appeals for Veterans Claims; 2012–2026	Vacant
