= Judge Greenberg =

Judge Greenberg may refer to:

- Morton Ira Greenberg (1933–2021), judge of the United States Court of Appeals for the Third Circuit
- William S. Greenberg (born 1942), judge of the United States Court of Appeals for Veterans Claims
