= Judge Moorman =

Judge Moorman may refer to:

- Charles Harwood Moorman (1876–1938), judge of the United States Court of Appeals for the Sixth Circuit
- William A. Moorman (born 1952), judge of the United States District Court for the Southern District of Florida
