= Judge Meredith =

Judge Meredith may refer to:

- Amanda L. Meredith (born 1972), judge of the United States Court of Appeals for Veterans Claims
- James Hargrove Meredith (1914–1988), judge of the United States District Court for the Eastern District of Missouri
- Ronald Edward Meredith (1946–1994), judge of the United States District Court for the Western District of Kentucky
