= Kasold =

Kasold is a surname. Notable people with the surname include:

- Michelle Kasold (born 1987), American field hockey player
- Bruce E. Kasold (born 1951), American judge
