= Thun v. Peake =

Thun vs. Peake
- Court: United States Court of Appeals for Veterans Claims
- Decided: April 23, 2008
- Citation: 22 Vet. App. 111 (2008)

Case history
- Appealed from: Board of Veterans' Appeals

Court membership
- Judges sitting: Greene (Chief Judge), Hagel (Associate Judge), and Schoelen (Associate Judge)

Thun vs. Peake is a United States Court of Appeals for Veterans Claims case that dealt with extra-schedular evaluations and the VA Schedule for Rating Disabilities.

== Background ==
The Veteran appealed his 70 percent evaluation for post traumatic stress disorder (PTSD), asserting that he was entitled to an extra-schedular evaluation because his PTSD symptoms prevented him from advancing at his job as a senior systems programmer. He stated that his PTSD symptoms strained relationships with his direct managers that prevented his promotion and less-experienced coworkers were promoted before him and received higher salaries. He argued that there was a significant disparity between his current income (including VA benefits) and income he believed he could have received, but for the severity of his service-connected disability, which was sufficient to trigger extra-schedular consideration.

The Board, in denying the appeal in June 2005, found that the evidence showed that he veteran did not have marked interference with obtaining or retaining employment and he had maintained steady, full-time, gainful employment since discharge from service and worked at his current job since May 1986.

== Analysis ==
The Court articulated a three-step process for determining entitlement to an extra-schedular rating and rejected the veteran’s argument that an inadequacy in the rating schedule can be established solely by showing an asserted gap between his income (including VA benefits) and the income of similarly qualified workers in his field. The Court described such argument as flawed because it was based on a faulty proposition that a schedular rating for a service-connected disability is not adequate unless it compensates for the actual individual income that is not realized but for that disability.

The three-step process for determining whether an extra-schedular evaluation is required was outlined by the Court as follows:

1. The evidence must present such an unusual disability picture that the available schedular evaluations for that service-connected disability are inadequate,
2. The schedular evaluation must not contemplate the claimant's level of disability and symptomatology and is found inadequate.
3. When an analysis reveals that the rating schedule is inadequate to evaluate a claimant's disability picture and that picture has related factors such as marked interference with employment or frequent periods of hospitalization, then the claim must be forwarded for an extra-schedular evaluation determination by either the Director of Compensation Service or the Under Secretary for Benefits.

The Court also found that the Board erred in its reasoning that the veteran’s PTSD did not warrant extra-schedular consideration because he did not establish an inability to obtain or retain employment. However, the error was not prejudicial because the decision not to refer for extra-schedular consideration was not based solely on that finding as the Board also made the threshold determination that the disability picture was not so unusual or exceptional as to render the 70 percent schedular rating as inadequate.

The Court noted that the very effects of the veteran’s PTSD symptoms that he asserted as having kept him from receiving a promotion, such as impaired judgment and inability to maintain effective working relationship, are criteria described as occupational impairments that are used for evaluating mental disorders under Diagnostic Code 9411, and not earmarks of an exceptional or unusual disability picture with marked interference with employment.

== Decision ==
The BVA Decision was affirmed by the Court.
