= Jonathan Steinberg =

Jonathan Steinberg may refer to:

- Jonathan Steinberg (historian) (1934–2021), American historian
- Jonathan Steinberg (politician), American politician from Connecticut
- Jonathan Steinberg, CEO of WisdomTree Investments
- Jonathan E. Steinberg, American screenwriter
- Jonathan R. Steinberg (1939–2015), American judge
- Yonatan Steinberg (1980–2023), Israeli soldier
