= Alan Lance =

American politician and judge

Senior Judge of the United States Court of Appeals for Veterans Claims
- Incumbent
- Assumed office April 30, 2017

Judge of the United States Court of Appeals for Veterans Claims
- In office December 17, 2004 – April 30, 2017
- Appointed by: George W. Bush
- Preceded by: Frank Q. Nebeker
- Succeeded by: Joseph L. Falvey Jr.

31st Attorney General of Idaho
- In office January 2, 1995 – January 6, 2003
- Governor: Phil Batt; Dirk Kempthorne
- Preceded by: Larry EchoHawk
- Succeeded by: Lawrence Wasden

National Commander of the American Legion
- In office 1999–2000
- Preceded by: Harold Miller
- Succeeded by: Ray Smith

Member of the Idaho House of Representatives from the
- In office December 1, 1990 – December 1, 1994
- Preceded by: Boyd Hill
- Succeeded by: Milt Erhart
- Constituency: 21st district (1990–1992); 14th district (1992–1994)

Personal details
- Born: Alan George Lance Sr. April 27, 1949 (age 76) McComb, Ohio, U.S.
- Party: Republican
- Education: South Dakota State University (BA); University of Toledo (JD)

Military service
- Allegiance: United States
- Branch/service: United States Army
- Years of service: 1974–1978
- Rank: Captain
- Unit: 172d Infantry Brigade; Corpus Christi Army Depot
- Awards: Army Commendation Medal

Alan George Lance Sr. (born April 27, 1949) is an American attorney, politician, and jurist who serves as a senior judge of the United States Court of Appeals for Veterans Claims. Lance previously served as the Idaho Attorney General and as a member of the Idaho House of Representatives.

== Early life and education ==
Al Lance was born on April 27, 1949, in McComb, Ohio. He received his Bachelor of Arts degree from South Dakota State University in 1971 and his Juris Doctor from the University of Toledo College of Law in 1973. From 1974 to 1978, he served as a junior officer in the 172d Infantry Brigade and at Corpus Christi Army Depot, receiving the Army Commendation Medal in 1977.

== Career ==
Lance began his legal career as an Assistant Prosecuting Attorney for Fulton County, Ohio. In 1978, Lance moved with his family to Meridian, Idaho, where he became involved with his local chapter of the American Legion.

Lance was elected to the Idaho House of Representatives in 1990 and served as Majority Caucus Chairman during his second term in office, from 1993 to 1995. He was elected Attorney General of Idaho in 1994, serving from 1995 to 2003, Idaho's longest-serving Attorney General at that time. While serving as Attorney General, he also served on the Executive Committee of the National Association of Attorneys General and as the Chairman of the Conference of Western Attorneys General.

He joined the Court of Appeals on December 16, 2004, after being nominated by President George W. Bush. Prior to that, Lance served as the National Commander of the American Legion from 1999 to 2000. He served as the 31st Attorney General of Idaho from 1995 to 2003 and was a member of the Idaho House of Representatives from 1990 to 1994.

Upon his retirement, Lance assumed senior status as a recall-eligible retired judge.

== See also ==
- List of people from Ohio
- List of University of Toledo people

Non-profit organization positions
Preceded by Harold L. Miller	National Commander of the American Legion; 1999–2000	Succeeded by Ray G. Smith
Political offices
Preceded by Larry EchoHawk	Attorney General of Idaho; 1995–2003	Succeeded by Lawrence Wasden
Legal offices
Preceded by Frank Q. Nebeker	Judge of the United States Court of Appeals for Veterans Claims; 2004–2017	Succeeded by Joseph L. Falvey Jr.
