= Ronald M. Holdaway =

American judge (born 1934)

Ronald Holdaway
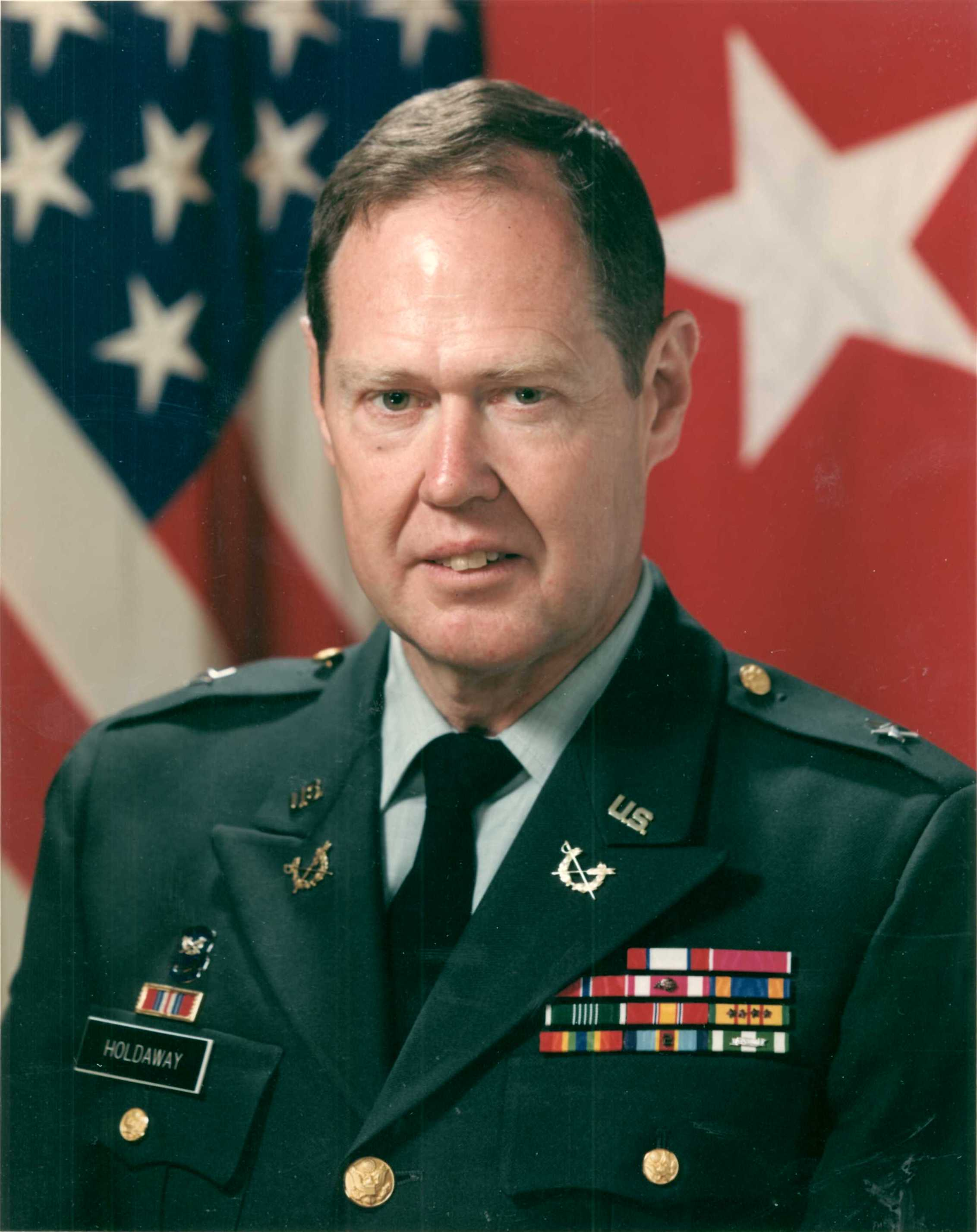

Senior Judge of the United States Court of Appeals for Veterans Claims
- Incumbent
- Assumed office November 2002

Judge of the United States Court of Appeals for Veterans Claims
- In office August 7, 1990 – November 2002
- Appointed by: George H. W. Bush
- Preceded by: Seat established
- Succeeded by: Lawrence B. Hagel

Personal details
- Born: November 27, 1934 (age 91) Afton, Wyoming, U.S.
- Education: University of Wyoming (BA, LLB)

Ronald M. Holdaway (born November 27, 1934) is a former judge of the United States Court of Appeals for Veterans Claims and retired United States Army brigadier general.

== Biography ==
Holdaway was born in Afton, Wyoming. After graduating from Star Valley High School in Afton, he received his Bachelor of Arts degree in history in 1957 and his law degree from the University of Wyoming in 1959. Upon completion of the Reserve Officers' Training Corps curriculum and the course of study at the University of Wyoming, he was commissioned a Second Lieutenant in the infantry, later transferring to the Judge Advocate General's Corps. His military education includes the Infantry Officer Basic Course, the Basic and Advanced Courses at the Judge Advocate General's School, the United States Army Command and General Staff College, and the Industrial College of the Armed Forces, National Defense University.

Prior to his appointment to the bench and retirement from the Army, Holdaway held a wide variety of important positions including Chief Judge, United States Army Court of Military Review, and Commander, United States Army Legal Services Agency, Washington, D.C.

Holdaway was also the Judge Advocate of United States Army Europe and Seventh Army in Heidelberg, Germany. Other key assignments included Executive to the Judge Advocate General, and Assistant Judge Advocate General for Civil Law. Earlier in his career he served in Vietnam as the Staff Judge Advocate of the 1st Cavalry Division. Returning to the United States, he served as Deputy and later as Chief of the Government Appellate Division of the U.S. Army Judiciary. In that capacity he was the Chief Government Appellate Counsel for the appellate phase of the Calley case. Remaining in Washington, he was the Chief of Personnel, Plans and Training Office with the Office of the Judge Advocate General. Following attendance at the Industrial College of the Armed Forces, Holdaway served as Staff Judge Advocate of VII U.S. Corps in Stuttgart, Germany. He retired from the U.S. Army in 1989 as a Brigadier General.

Holdaway was nominated by President George H. W. Bush and confirmed by the United States Senate as a Judge of the United States Court of Veterans Appeals in 1990.

Ronald M. Holdaway retired from the U.S. Court of Appeals for Veterans Claims in November 2002. He married Judith K. Janowski in December 1958 and has two children. His younger twin brother Donald, a retired United States Air Force lawyer, died in 2016.

Legal offices
New seat	Judge of the United States Court of Appeals for Veterans Claims; 1990–2002	Succeeded by Lawrence B. Hagel
