= Donald L. Ivers =

American judge (born 1941)

Don Ivers
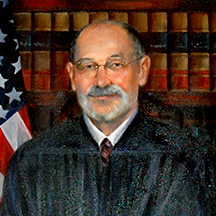

Senior Judge of the United States Court of Appeals for Veterans Claims
- In office August 6, 2005 – 2017

Chief Judge of the United States Court of Appeals for Veterans Claims
- In office 2004–2005
- Preceded by: Ken Kramer
- Succeeded by: William P. Greene Jr.

Judge of the United States Court of Appeals for Veterans Claims
- In office August 7, 1990 – August 7, 2005
- Appointed by: George H. W. Bush
- Preceded by: Seat established
- Succeeded by: Seat abolished

General Counsel of the Veterans Administration
- In office 1985–1990
- President: Ronald Reagan; George H. W. Bush
- Preceded by: John Murphy
- Succeeded by: Raoul Carroll

Chief Counsel of the Federal Highway Administration
- In office 1981–1984
- Preceded by: Lorenzo Casanova
- Succeeded by: Anthony McMahon

Personal details
- Born: Donald Louis Ivers; May 6, 1941 (age 85) San Diego, California, U.S.
- Education: New Mexico Military Institute (attended); University of New Mexico (BA); American University (JD); Georgetown University (attended)

Military service
- Branch/service: United States Army
- Years of service: 1963–1968
- Rank: Lieutenant Colonel
- Unit: United States Army Reserve
- Battles/wars: Vietnam War
- Awards: Bronze Star; Air Medal; Meritorious Service Medal; Army Commendation Medal; Joint Service Achievement Medal

Donald Louis Ivers (born May 6, 1941) is an American lawyer who served as a judge of the United States Court of Appeals for Veterans Claims.

Born in San Diego, California, Ivers attended New Mexico Military Institute and the University of New Mexico. He earned his J.D. degree from American University, Washington, D.C., and pursued graduate legal studies at Georgetown University, Washington, D.C. Ivers served on active duty in the United States Army from 1963 to 1968, with assignments in the United States, Germany, and Vietnam. He retired from the U.S. Army Reserve with the rank of lieutenant colonel. His decorations include the Bronze Star, Air Medal, Meritorious Service Medal, Army Commendation Medal and the Joint Service Achievement Medal.

From 1972 to 1978, Ivers was an attorney with the firm Brault, Graham, Scott, and Brault in Washington, D.C., specializing in civil litigation. Prior to his appointment with the United States Department of Transportation in May 1981, Ivers served as chief counsel for the Republican National Committee and was active in the 1980 Presidential Campaign and in the Reagan Administration transition, in charge of the transition team for the Federal Maritime Commission.

From 1984 to 1985, Ivers was counselor to the Secretary of Transportation and chairman of the Secretary's Safety Review Task Force. During that same period and from 1981 to 1984 he served as chief counsel of the Federal Highway Administration. From 1985 to 1990, Ivers served as general counsel of the Veterans Administration (VA) and as acting general counsel of the Department of Veterans Affairs upon its creation in March 1990. He directed a nationwide legal staff of some 650, including 320 attorneys. His office was responsible for providing legal advice and services to the administrator and secretary, and to the nationwide VA staff of some 240,000.

Ivers was nominated by President George H. W. Bush and appointed to the United States Court of Appeals for Veterans Claims on August 6, 1990.

Ivers served as chief judge and retired in August 2005 from the U.S. Court of Appeals for Veterans Claims. He is now serving in recall status. He is married and has three children.

Legal offices
New seat	Judge of the United States Court of Appeals for Veterans Claims; 1990–2005	Seat abolished
Preceded by Ken Kramer	Chief Judge of the United States Court of Appeals for Veterans Claims; 2004–2005	Succeeded by William P. Greene Jr.
