= William P. Greene Jr. =

American judge (born 1943)

Bill Greene
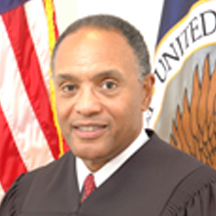

Senior Judge of the United States Court of Appeals for Veterans Claims
- Incumbent
- Assumed office November 2010

Chief Judge of the United States Court of Appeals for Veterans Claims
- In office August 8, 2005 – August 6, 2010
- Preceded by: Donald L. Ivers
- Succeeded by: Bruce E. Kasold

Judge of the United States Court of Appeals for Veterans Claims
- In office November 23, 1997 – November 2010
- Appointed by: Bill Clinton
- Preceded by: Hart T. Mankin
- Succeeded by: Coral Wong Pietsch

Personal details
- Born: William Parnell Greene, Jr. July 27, 1943 (age 82) Bluefield, West Virginia, U.S.
- Spouse: Madeline Sinkford
- Education: West Virginia State University (BA); Howard University (JD)

Military service
- Branch/service: United States Army
- Years of service: 1965-1993
- Rank: Colonel
- Unit: Army Judge Advocate General Corps
- Awards: Legion of Merit (3); Meritorious Service Medal (3); Army Commendation Medal (2)

William Parnell Greene Jr. (born July 27, 1943) is a former judge of the United States Court of Appeals for Veterans Claims.

== Family, Early years and education ==
Born in Bluefield, West Virginia, Greene was raised during the Jim Crow era. His grandfather and father were both railway workers, with his grandfather later becoming a teacher. His father later decided to follow in his grandfather's footsteps, studying English and Music at Bluefield State College.

Greene's father was drafted during the Second World War, and later served in the Korean War, moving his family to Fort Knox. While he initially hoped to become a lawyer, Greene joined the Reserve Officers' Training Corps during his studies at West Virginia State College, graduating in 1965 with a Bachelor of Arts in Political Science and a commission as a 2LT in the United States Army.

== United States Army ==
In December 1965, 2LT Greene was assigned to the Signal Corps, which also allowed him to continue his studies, graduating with a Juris Doctor from Howard University School of Law in 1968, at which time he was recommissioned as a Judge Advocate in the United States Army Judge Advocate General's Corps. During his career as a Judge Advocate, he completed his military education with the Basic, Advanced, and Military Judges' courses at The Judge Advocate General's Legal Center and School, Charlottesville, Virginia; the United States Army Command and General Staff College at Fort Leavenworth, Kansas; and the United States Army War College, Carlisle, Pennsylvania.

Greene held numerous positions during his years in the US Army. He served as the Chief Prosecutor at Fort Knox, Kentucky, followed by duty as the Chief Defense Counsel in the Army Command at Fort Shafter, Hawaii. He was the Army's chief recruiter for lawyers from 1974 to 1977. In 1981, the Judge Advocate General of the United States Army selected him as the Department Chair of the Criminal Law Division at The Judge Advocate General's Legal Center and School. He also served in Germany as the Deputy Staff Judge Advocate of the 3rd Infantry Division and in Korea as the Staff Judge Advocate of the 2nd Infantry Division. Following his graduation from the U.S. Army War College in 1986, he was selected to serve as the Staff Judge Advocate of the United States Military Academy at West Point, New York. That assignment was followed by another selection as Staff Judge Advocate at Fort Leavenworth, Kansas, with duties that also included legal oversight of the Armed Forces' maximum security prison.

He retired as a Colonel from the United States Army in 1993, to accept an appointment a United States Judge.

== United States Judge ==
In 1993, while serving as Staff Judge Advocate at Fort Leavenworth, Kansas, Greene was selected and appointed by the United States Attorney General Janet Reno as a United States Immigration Judge in the Executive Office for Immigration Review. From June 13, 1993, until November 22, 1997, he presided over immigration cases in Maryland and Pennsylvania.

On November 7, 1997, Greene was appointed by President Bill Clinton to a fifteen-year term as a Judge of the United States Court of Appeals for Veterans Claims. On August 8, 2005, he was appointed as the Chief Judge of that court, holding that position until August 6, 2010, when he entered semi-retirement as a Senior Judge of that court.

== Awards and honors ==
During his Army service, Greene received several awards including three awards of the Legion of Merit.

On October 7, 1997, the Secretary of the Army designated Greene as Honorary Colonel of the Judge Advocate General's Corps Regiment. In October 2000, he was recognized as a Distinguished Member of the Judge Advocate General's Corps Regiment.

In May 2008, Greene was the recipient of the Chief Justice John Marshall Lifetime Achievement Award presented by the Judge Advocates Association.

== Personal life ==
Greene is married to the former Madeline Sinkford, also of Bluefield, West Virginia. They have two sons: William Robert, who has worked as a manager with Dun and Bradstreet, and Jeffery, who has served as an officer and physician in the United States Army Medical Corps.

Legal offices
| Preceded by Hart T. Mankin | Judge of the United States Court of Appeals for Veterans Claims; 1997–2010 | Succeeded by Coral Wong Pietsch |
| Preceded by Donald L. Ivers | Chief Judge of the United States Court of Appeals for Veterans Claims; 2005–2010 | Succeeded by Bruce E. Kasold |
