= Ken Kramer =

American politician & judge (born 1942)

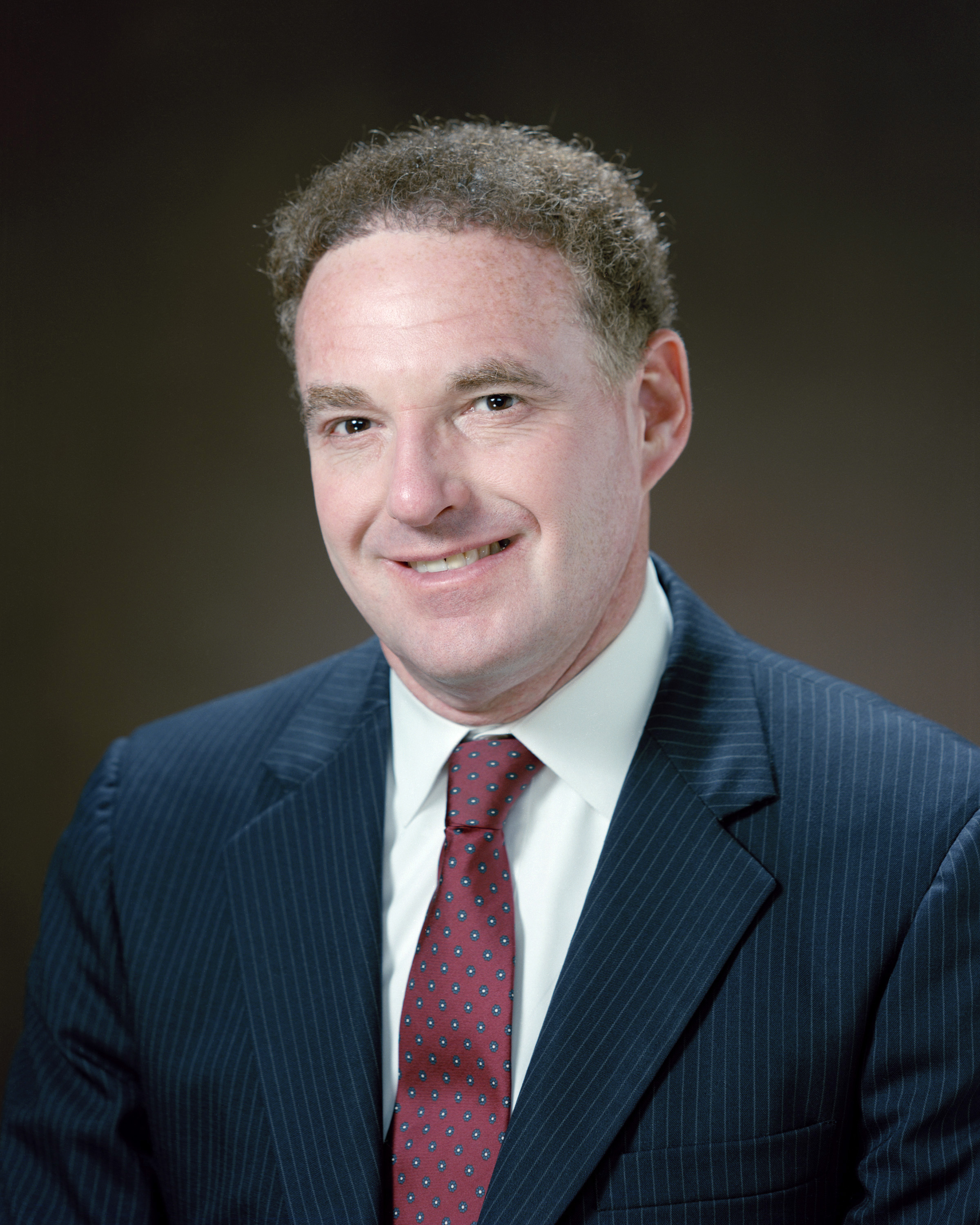

Senior Judge of the United States Court of Appeals for Veterans Claims
- Incumbent
- Assumed office September 14, 2004

Chief Judge of the United States Court of Appeals for Veterans Claims
- In office October 6, 2000 – September 14, 2004
- Preceded by: Frank Q. Nebeker
- Succeeded by: Donald L. Ivers

Judge of the United States Court of Appeals for Veterans Claims
- In office September 15, 1989 – September 14, 2004
- Appointed by: George H. W. Bush
- Preceded by: Seat established
- Succeeded by: William A. Moorman

Assistant Secretary of the Army for Financial Management and Comptroller
- In office October 14, 1988 – 1989
- President: Ronald Reagan
- Preceded by: Michael P. W. Stone
- Succeeded by: Douglas A. Brook

Member of the U.S. House of Representatives from Colorado's 5th district
- In office January 3, 1979 – January 3, 1987
- Preceded by: Bill Armstrong
- Succeeded by: Joel Hefley

Member of the Colorado House of Representatives from the 18th district
- In office January 2, 1974 – January 3, 1979
- Preceded by: William Hybl
- Succeeded by: Frank Randall

Personal details
- Born: Kenneth Bentley Kramer; February 19, 1942 (age 84) Chicago, Illinois, U.S.
- Party: Republican
- Education: University of Illinois, Urbana-Champaign (BA); Harvard University (JD)

Military service
- Allegiance: United States
- Branch/service: United States Army
- Years of service: 1967–1970
- Rank: Captain

Kenneth Bentley Kramer (born February 19, 1942) is an American lawyer, politician, and jurist from Colorado. He is a former Republican member of the United States House of Representatives, serving four consecutive terms from 1979 to 1987.

== Early life and education ==
Born in 1942, in Chicago, Kramer grew up in the city's suburb of Skokie, Illinois. He attended the University of Illinois, and after earning his degree, entered Harvard University, from which he received his Juris Doctor.

== Career ==
In 1966, he was admitted to the bar, and by 1970, he had risen to the position of assistant district attorney for the state's Fourth Judicial District.

In 1972, Kramer was elected to the Colorado House of Representatives and served for three terms until 1978.

=== Congress ===
That year, he was elected to represent the state's 5th congressional district, filling the vacancy left by U.S. Senator-elect William Armstrong. Kramer held the seat for eight years.

=== Senate race ===
In 1986, he retired to run for the United States Senate, but lost the election to Democrat Tim Wirth.

== Later career ==
Kramer returned to Colorado Springs, Colorado to be an attorney in private practice.

Since retiring, Kramer has held several positions. President Ronald Reagan nominated Kramer to be Assistant Secretary of the Army (Financial Management and Comptroller) on June 10, 1988; the United States Senate confirmed Kramer by unanimous consent on October 14, 1988. He was nominated by President George H. W. Bush and appointed as a Judge on the United States Court of Appeals for Veterans Claims in 1989. He was chief judge of the court from 2000 until he retired in 2004. He is married to Louise Kotoshirodo Kramer.

== Electoral history ==
United States House of Representatives elections, 1978
Party	Candidate	Votes	%
Republican	Ken Kramer	91,933	59.78
Democratic	Gerry Frank	52,914	34.41
Independent	L.W. Dan Bridges	8,933	5.81
Total votes		153,780	100.0
Republican hold			

United States House of Representatives elections, 1980
Party	Candidate	Votes	%
Republican	Ken Kramer (incumbent)	177,319	72.41
Democratic	Ed Schreiber	62,003	25.32
Libertarian	John A. Lanning	5,578	2.27
Total votes		244,900	100.0
Republican hold			

United States House of Representatives elections, 1982
Party	Candidate	Votes	%
Republican	Ken Kramer (incumbent)	84,479	59.55
Democratic	Thomas Cronin	57,392	40.45
Total votes		141,871	100.0
Republican hold			

United States House of Representatives elections, 1984
Party	Candidate	Votes	%
Republican	Ken Kramer (incumbent)	163,654	78.59
Democratic	William Geffen	44,588	21.41
Total votes		206,242	100.0
Republican hold			

1986 U.S. Senate election results, Colorado
Party	Candidate	Votes	%	±%
Democratic	Tim Wirth	529,449	49.91%	−0.42%
Republican	Ken Kramer	512,994	48.36%	−0.34%
Independent	Michael Martin Bush	11,127	1.05%	
Socialist Workers	Michael R. Chamberlain	3,756	0.35%	
Independent American	Henry John Olshaw	1,868	0.18%	−0.17%
Prohibition	Calvin G. Dodge	1,571	0.15%	
Majority		16,455	1.55%	−0.09%
Turnout		1,060,765		
Democratic hold		Swing		

== See also ==
- List of Jewish members of the United States Congress

U.S. House of Representatives
Preceded by Bill Armstrong	Member of the U.S. House of Representatives from Colorado's 5th congressional district 1979–1987	Succeeded by Joel Hefley
Party political offices
Preceded by Mary Estill Buchanan	Republican nominee for U.S. Senator from Colorado (Class 3); 1986	Succeeded by Terry Considine
Legal offices
New seat	Judge of the United States Court of Appeals for Veterans Claims; 1989–2004	Succeeded by William A. Moorman
Preceded by Frank Q. Nebeker	Chief Judge of the United States Court of Appeals for Veterans Claims; 2000–2004	Succeeded by Donald L. Ivers
U.S. order of precedence (ceremonial)
Preceded by Hal Daub as Former U.S. Representative	Order of precedence of the United States as Former U.S. Representative	Succeeded by Ken Buck as Former U.S. Representative
