= Robert N. Davis =

American judge (born 1953)

Robert Davis
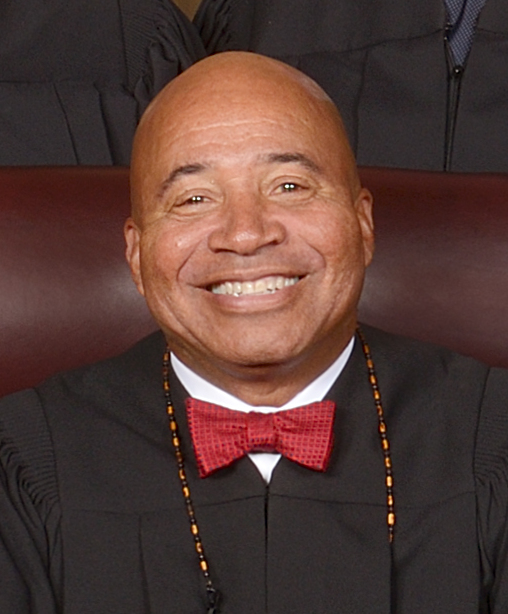
- Judge Davis in 2018

Senior Judge of the United States Court of Appeals for Veterans Claims
- Incumbent
- Assumed office December 3, 2019

Chief Judge of the United States Court of Appeals for Veterans Claims
- In office October 10, 2016 – December 3, 2019
- Preceded by: Lawrence B. Hagel
- Succeeded by: Margaret Bartley

Judge of the United States Court of Appeals for Veterans Claims
- In office December 4, 2004 – December 3, 2019
- Appointed by: George W. Bush
- Preceded by: Seat established
- Succeeded by: Grant C. Jaquith

Personal details
- Born: Robert Nolan Davis; September 20, 1953 (age 71)
- Education: University of Hartford (BA); Georgetown University (JD)

Robert Nolan Davis (born September 20, 1953) is a senior judge of the United States Court of Appeals for Veterans Claims.

== Education and career ==
Davis graduated from the University of Hartford, West Hartford, Connecticut, in 1975 and the Georgetown University Law Center, Washington, D.C., in 1978. He practiced as an appellate attorney for five years with the Commodity Futures Trading Commission, Washington, D.C. Thereafter, Davis spent four years with the United States Department of Education, Washington, D.C., in the business and administrative law division. Davis also briefly served as a Special Assistant United States Attorney in the District of Columbia as part of a federal agency exchange program.

Davis was a full tenured professor of law at Stetson University College of Law, Gulfport, Florida. He joined the Stetson law faculty in August 2001 after teaching for thirteen years at the University of Mississippi School of Law where he was a tenured full professor. He has also held teaching positions at the University of South Florida, Georgetown University Law Center, the University of Memphis, and Washington and Lee University. He has taught in summer programs at the University of Hawaii, Downing College, Cambridge University, England, Estonia and has lectured at Makerere University School of Law in Uganda and at the University of Papua New Guinea.

Davis has taught constitutional law, administrative law, national/international security law, alternative dispute resolution, terrorism/counter-terrorism and international and domestic sports law. He is the founder of the Journal of National Security Law, and has held positions of leadership with the American Bar Association's Standing Committee on Law and National Security, the Federalist Society and the Association of American Law Schools. He has authored numerous articles on a variety of subjects including a recent article published by the Brooklyn Journal of International Law entitled: "Striking the Balance: National Security vs. Civil Liberties". He has been a frequent commentator on local television, radio and newspapers regarding national security, terrorism, constitutional law and elections issues. While teaching in Mississippi, he was appointed by the Governor as a Mississippi Commissioner to the National Conference of Commissioners on Uniform State Laws.

Davis has extensive experience as an arbitrator and mediator with the American Arbitration Association. He was a mediator with the United States Postal Service and was an arbitration panel member with the United States Olympic Committee. Davis was a commander in the United States Navy Reserve and was recalled to active duty after the terrorist attacks on September 11, 2001. He was assigned to the Joint Intelligence Directorate at MacDill Air Force Base, Tampa, Florida.

=== Court of Appeals for Veterans Claims ===
On December 4, 2004, Davis was appointed by President George W. Bush to a seat on the United States Court of Appeals for Veterans Claims. He became chief judge on October 10, 2016. He assumed senior status on December 3, 2019.

Legal offices
New seat	Judge of the United States Court of Appeals for Veterans Claims; 2004–2019	Succeeded by Grant C. Jaquith
Preceded by Lawrence B. Hagel	Chief Judge of the United States Court of Appeals for Veterans Claims; 2016–2019	Succeeded by Margaret Bartley
