= Lawrence B. Hagel =

American judge (born 1947)

Larry Hagel
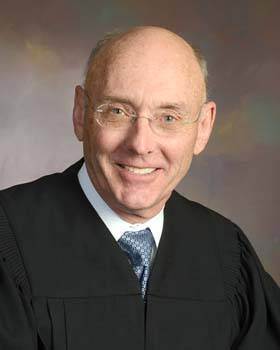

Senior Judge of the United States Court of Appeals for Veterans Claims
- Incumbent
- Assumed office October 8, 2016

Chief Judge of the United States Court of Appeals for Veterans Claims
- In office August 2015 – October 8, 2016
- Preceded by: Bruce E. Kasold
- Succeeded by: Robert N. Davis

Judge of the United States Court of Appeals for Veterans Claims
- In office January 2, 2004 – October 8, 2016
- Appointed by: George W. Bush
- Preceded by: Ronald M. Holdaway
- Succeeded by: Joseph L. Toth

Personal details
- Born: Lawrence Bain Hagel; March 27, 1947 (age 79) Washington, Indiana, U.S.
- Education: United States Naval Academy (BS); University of the Pacific (JD); George Washington University (LLM)

Lawrence Bain Hagel (born March 27, 1947) is an American lawyer and judge. He was appointed to the United States Court of Appeals for Veterans Claims by President George W. Bush in December 2003. He became Chief Judge in August 2015. He assumed senior status on October 8, 2016.

== Early life and military career ==
Judge Hagel was born on March 27, 1947, in Washington, Indiana. He graduated from the United States Naval Academy with a Bachelor of Science in 1969. Upon graduation, Judge Hagel was commissioned as a Second Lieutenant in the United States Marine Corps. Judge Hagel served as an Infantry Platoon Commander in the Vietnam War. He also served as a Military Advisor to a Vietnamese Infantry Battalion. Judge Hagel was awarded the Combat Action Ribbon, the Meritorious Service Medal (three awards), the Joint Service Commendation Medal, and the Army Commendation Medal.

== Legal education and career ==
In 1976, Judge Hagel graduated from the University of the Pacific McGeorge School of Law with a Juris Doctor degree. In 1983, he earned a Master of Laws degree in labor law, graduating with highest honors from The National Law Center at George Washington University Law School.

Prior to his appointment to the U.S. Court of Appeals for Veterans Claims, Judge Hagel was General Counsel to the Paralyzed Veterans of America. During his time with the Paralyzed Veterans of America, Judge Hagel was instrumental in advocating on behalf of military veterans with spinal cord injuries and diseases.

During the 14 years prior to his appointment to the U.S. Court of Appeals for Veterans Claims, Judge Hagel was committed to promoting legal issues concerning veterans and veterans' benefits. In 1995, he served as a member of the Administrative Conference of the United States. He served on the Steering Committee for the District of Columbia Bar Administrative Law and Agency Practice Section from 1999 to 2003 and on the United States Court of Appeals for Veterans Claims Rules Advisory Committee from 1992 to 2003. He served on the executive board of the Veterans Consortium Pro Bono Program from 1992 to 2003. Judge Hagel served as Chair of the Veterans Law Committee Section of the Federal Bar Association from 1994 to 1995.

== Personal life ==
Hagel is the father of comedy writer Jenny Hagel.

Legal offices
Preceded by Ronald M. Holdaway	Judge of the United States Court of Appeals for Veterans Claims; 2004–2016	Succeeded by Joseph L. Toth
Preceded by Bruce E. Kasold	Chief Judge of the United States Court of Appeals for Veterans Claims; 2015–2016	Succeeded by Robert N. Davis
