= Hart T. Mankin =

American judge (1933–1996)

Hart Tiller Mankin

Senior Judge of the United States Court of Appeals for Veterans Claims
- In office 1995 – May 28, 1996

Judge of the United States Court of Appeals for Veterans Claims
- In office 1990–1995
- Appointed by: George H. W. Bush
- Preceded by: Seat established
- Succeeded by: William P. Greene Jr.

Personal details
- Born: December 26, 1933 Cleveland, Ohio, U.S.
- Died: May 28, 1996 (aged 62) Washington, D.C., U.S.
- Resting place: Arlington National Cemetery

Hart T. Mankin (December 26, 1933 – May 28, 1996) was a United States lawyer and judge who served as General Counsel of the Navy from 1971 to 1973.

== Biography ==
Hart T. Mankin was born in Cleveland. Mankin was educated at Sewanee: The University of the South, graduating in 1954. Upon graduation, he joined the United States Air Force and served from 1954 to 1957. Upon leaving the Air Force in 1957, he remained a member of the Air Force Reserve until 1965, ultimately attaining the rank of Captain. After leaving the Air Force, he enrolled at the University of Houston Law Center, graduating in 1960.

After graduating from law school, Mankin formed a law practice in Houston. During this period, he was also active in the Republican Party, serving as chairman of the Harris County Republican Executive Committee at a time when George H. W. Bush was also active in the Harris County Republican Executive Committee.

He had three children with his wife Ruth Larson. Their names are Margaret Ruth, Theodore Howard, and Susan Ruth.

In 1969, Mankin moved to Washington, D.C., to become general counsel of the General Services Administration.

In 1971, President of the United States Richard Nixon nominated Mankin as General Counsel of the Navy and he subsequently held this office from June 7, 1971, until July 21, 1973. He was awarded the Navy Distinguished Public Service Award.

Upon leaving government service in 1973, Mankin moved to Delaware and became General Counsel of Columbia Gas. He worked there until 1989. During his time at Columbia Gas, he also served a term as chairman of the legal committee of the American Gas Association. He was also an adjunct professor and member of the board of governors of Widener University. When George H. W. Bush ran for president in the 1988 election, Mankin served as co-chairman of the Delaware Bush-Quayle Committee.

President George H. W. Bush nominated Mankin to the United States Court of Appeals for Veterans Claims in 1989 and he was confirmed by the United States Senate in 1990.

Mankin was a judge until his death aged 72 on May 28, 1996, at his home in Washington, D.C. He was buried at Arlington National Cemetery, in Arlington, Virginia.

Government offices
Preceded by Meritt H. Steger	General Counsel of the Navy; June 7, 1971 – July 21, 1973	Succeeded by E. Grey Lewis
