= Amanda L. Meredith =

American judge (born 1972)

Amanda Meredith
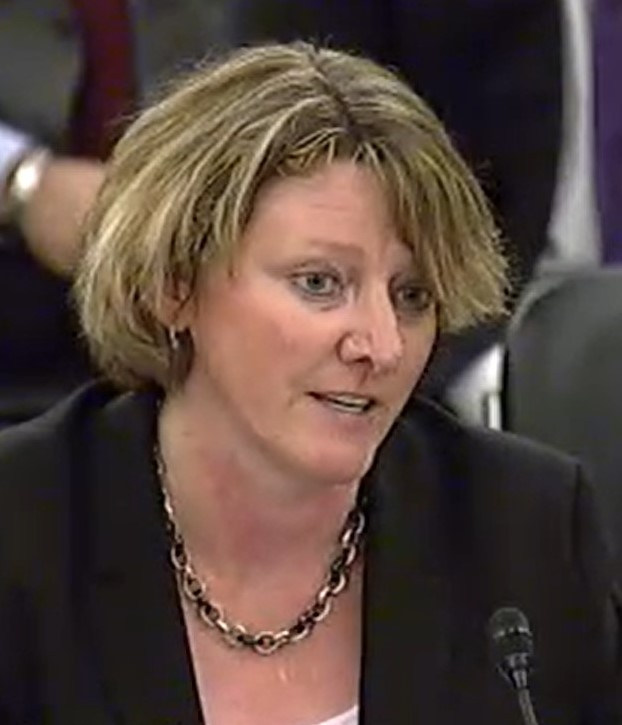

Judge of the United States Court of Appeals for Veterans Claims
- Incumbent
- Assumed office August 9, 2017
- Appointed by: Donald Trump
- Preceded by: William A. Moorman

Personal details
- Born: 1972 (age 53–54)
- Education: State University of New York, Buffalo (BA, JD)

Amanda Lee Meredith (born 1972) is an American lawyer who serves as a judge of the United States Court of Appeals for Veterans Claims. Prior to becoming a judge, she served as the deputy staff director and general counsel of the United States Senate Committee on Veterans' Affairs.

== Biography ==
Meredith received her Bachelor of Science from the University at Buffalo, summa cum laude, and her Juris Doctor from its law school, magna cum laude, where she was a member of the Buffalo Law Review.

After graduating from law school, Meredith served as director of the Task Force for Backlog Reduction for the United States Court of Appeals for Veterans Claims and as a law clerk and executive attorney to Chief Judge Ken Kramer of the same court.

Meredith served as general counsel to the United States Senate Committee on Veterans' Affairs and as benefits counsel to Ranking Member Richard Burr of North Carolina and Ranking Member Larry Craig of Idaho.

== Court of Appeals for Veterans Claims ==
On June 7, 2017, President Trump nominated Meredith to serve as a Judge of the United States Court of Appeals for Veterans Claims. A hearing on her nomination before the Senate Veterans' Affairs Committee was held on July 19, 2017. On July 20, 2017, the committee voted to report her nomination favorably. Her nomination was confirmed by the Senate with a voice vote on August 3, 2017.

Legal offices
Preceded by William A. Moorman	Judge of the United States Court of Appeals for Veterans Claims; 2017–present	Incumbent
