= William S. Greenberg =

American judge (1942–2026)

Bill Greenberg
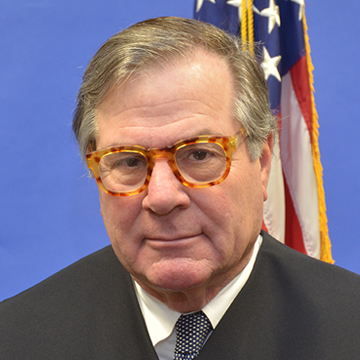

Judge of the United States Court of Appeals for Veterans Claims
- In office December 28, 2012 – March 16, 2026
- Appointed by: Barack Obama
- Preceded by: Seat established
- Succeeded by: Vacant

Personal details
- Born: December 2, 1942 New York, U.S.
- Died: March 16, 2026 (aged 83) Washington, D.C., U.S.
- Education: Johns Hopkins University (BA); Rutgers University, Newark (JD)

William S. Greenberg (December 2, 1942 – March 16, 2026) was an American lawyer who served as a judge of the United States Court of Appeals for Veterans Claims. Previously he was a New Jersey attorney in private practice.

== Biography ==
Greenberg was born in 1942. He received his Bachelor of Arts degree in 1964 from Johns Hopkins University. He received his Juris Doctor in 1967 from Rutgers University School of Law in Newark. He served in the United States Army Reserve for 27 years, rising to the rank of Brigadier General.

Greenberg was a partner of McCarter & English, LLP. He initially joined the firm as an associate following a judicial clerkship in 1968, then returned as a partner in 1993. The majority of his career has involved litigation in federal and state courts.

Greenberg had been a Certified Civil Trial Attorney by the Supreme Court of New Jersey since 1983. He was president of the Association of Trial Lawyers of America, New Jersey, (The New Jersey Association for Justice) and has served as trustee of the New Jersey State Bar Association and of the New Jersey State Bar Foundation. He also served as a member of the New Jersey Supreme Court Committee on the Admission of Foreign Attorneys. He established and chaired the New Jersey State Bar Association (public service/pro bono) program of military legal assistance for members of the Reserve Components called to active duty after September 11, 2001. He was a member of the New Jersey Supreme Court Civil Practice Committee. With the approval of the Secretary of Defense, on the recommendation of The White House, Greenberg became chairman of the Reserve Forces Policy Board in 2009, a board established by the Secretary of Defense in 1951 and by Act of Congress in 1952. On July 26, 2011, Greenberg was awarded the Secretary of Defense Medal for Outstanding Public Service, the second highest civilian award in the Defense Department, at a public ceremony in the Pentagon, and completed his term in August 2011.

Greenberg was a commissioner of the New Jersey State Commission of Investigation. He also served as assistant counsel to the governor of New Jersey and as commissioner of the New Jersey State Scholarship Commission.

Greenberg served as the first adjunct professor of military law at the Seton Hall University School of Law. He also served as an adjunct professor at Georgetown University Law Center.

== Court of Appeals service ==
On November 15, 2012, President Barack Obama nominated Greenberg to serve as a United States Judge for the United States Court of Appeals for Veterans Claims. The office is an Article I judgeship, with a fifteen-year term appointment. The Senate confirmed his nomination by unanimous consent on December 21, 2012. On December 27, 2012, he was commissioned by the president and took the judicial oath on December 28, 2012.

== Personal life and death ==
He was married to the former Betty Kaufmann Wolf of Pittsburgh. They had three children: Katherine of New York, Anthony of Baltimore, and Elizabeth of Baltimore; and four grandchildren, Sebastian of New York, Lillian of Baltimore, Samuel of Baltimore, and Emiko of Baltimore.

Greenberg died on March 16, 2026, aged 83.

Legal offices
New seat	Judge of the United States Court of Appeals for Veterans Claims; 2012–2026	Vacant
