= Bruce E. Kasold =

American judge (born 1951)

Bruce Kasold
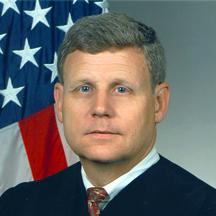

Senior Judge of the United States Court of Appeals for Veterans Claims
- Incumbent
- Assumed office December 2016

Chief Judge of the United States Court of Appeals for Veterans Claims
- In office August 2010 – August 2015
- Preceded by: William P. Greene Jr.
- Succeeded by: Lawrence B. Hagel

Judge of the United States Court of Appeals for Veterans Claims
- In office December 31, 2003 – December 2016
- Appointed by: George W. Bush
- Preceded by: Seat established
- Succeeded by: Michael P. Allen

Personal details
- Born: Bruce Edward Kasold; April 26, 1951 (age 74) New York City, New York, U.S.
- Education: United States Military Academy (BS); University of Florida (JD); Georgetown University (LLM)

Military service
- Allegiance: United States
- Branch/service: United States Army
- Years of service: 1973–1994
- Rank: Lieutenant Colonel
- Unit: Army Judge Advocate General's Corps

Bruce Edward Kasold (born April 26, 1951) is an American lawyer and former judge. He was appointed as a judge to the United States Court of Appeals for Veterans Claims by President George W. Bush in December 2003. He served as the chief judge of the Court from August 2010 to August 2015. Kasold is a graduate of Bishop McGann-Mercy Diocesan High School in Riverhead, New York. He earned his undergraduate degree from the United States Military Academy at West Point in 1973, and his Juris Doctor from the University of Florida Law School in 1979. Kasold also earned a Master of Laws from the Georgetown University Law Center in 1982 and a Master of Laws equivalent from the Judge Advocate General's Legal Center and School in 1984.

== Early career ==
After graduating from West Point, Judge Kasold served in the Air Defense Artillery of the U.S. Army from 1973 to 1976. While in law school, Judge Kasold served at Fort Rucker in Alabama as an assistant defense counsel in 1977 and as an assistant prosecutor in 1978. From 1979 to 1994, Judge Kasold served in the Judge Advocate General's Corps. During that time, Judge Kasold served as Assistant General Counsel in the U.S. Army's Office of General Counsel. Judge Kasold also served as a Special Assistant U.S. Attorney in military and administrative law. Judge Kasold served in the U.S. Army for more than 20 years.

After working at the prominent, Florida-based law firm of Holland & Knight in its Washington, D.C., office, Judge Kasold became the Chief Counsel for the United States Senate Committee on Rules and Administration. Prior to his federal appointment, Judge Kasold served as Chief Counsel for both the Secretary of the United States Senate and the Sergeant at Arms of the United States Senate from 1998 to 2003. In that position, Judge Kasold advised Senate leaders on legal issues at the forefront of the nation's political landscape, including the Electoral college, the impeachment of President Clinton, and the historical management of an evenly divided Senate.

== Leadership positions ==
Judge Kasold served as President of the Capitol Hill Chapter of the Federal Bar Association from 2001 to 2002.

== Personal life ==
Judge Kasold is married and has one child. He also has one niece.

Legal offices
New seat	Judge of the United States Court of Appeals for Veterans Claims; 2003–2016	Succeeded by Michael P. Allen
Preceded by William P. Greene Jr.	Chief Judge of the United States Court of Appeals for Veterans Claims; 2010–2015	Succeeded by Lawrence B. Hagel
