= William A. Moorman =

American judge (born 1945)

Bill Moorman
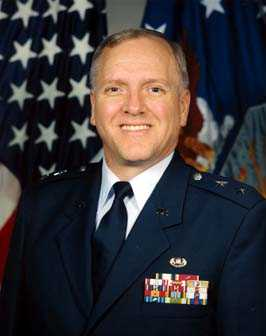
- Official portrait, 2020

Senior Judge of the United States Court of Appeals for Veterans Claims
- Incumbent
- Assumed office September 1, 2015

Judge of the United States Court of Appeals for Veterans Claims
- In office December 16, 2004 – September 1, 2015
- Appointed by: George W. Bush
- Preceded by: Ken Kramer
- Succeeded by: Amanda L. Meredith

Personal details
- Born: William Albert Moorman; January 23, 1945 (age 80); Chicago, Illinois, U.S.
- Education: University of Illinois, Urbana-Champaign (BA, JD)

Military service
- Allegiance: United States
- Branch/service: United States Air Force
- Rank: Major General
- Commands: Air Force Judge Advocate General's Corps

William Albert Moorman (born January 23, 1945) is a senior judge of the United States Court of Appeals for Veterans Claims.

Born in Chicago, Moorman received a Bachelor of Arts in history and economics from the University of Illinois Urbana-Champaign in 1967, and a Juris Doctor from the University of Illinois College of Law in 1970, from which he was designated a Distinguished Graduate in 2000. He was commissioned a second lieutenant in the United States Air Force through the Reserve Officers Training Corps in June 1970.

On active duty, Moorman rose to the grade of major general, last serving as the Judge Advocate General of the United States Air Force, the Air Force's highest-ranking uniformed lawyer. In that position he directed an active and reserve force of more than 2,500 uniformed and civilian attorneys. He was serving in that position at The Pentagon on September 11, 2001, when terrorists attacked the United States. During his career, he was the first staff judge advocate of the new joint-service U.S. Strategic Command and was the staff judge advocate of the air component for Operation Just Cause in Panama and the Bosnian operations in Europe. He was the only judge advocate ever to serve as the senior officer aboard Looking Glass, the nation's airborne nuclear forces command post. Moorman's military decorations include the Distinguished Service Medal with oak leaf cluster, the Legion of Merit with oak leaf cluster, the Joint Meritorious Service Medal, and the Meritorious Service Medal with four oak leaf clusters. He retired from the Air Force in April 2002, after 31 years of service.

In July 2002, Moorman joined the United States Department of Veterans Affairs and was named assistant to the secretary for Regulation Policy and Management. In this position he was a senior advisor to the secretary with principal responsibility for regulatory reform, leading the department's effort to overhaul its compensation and pension regulations.

In 2004, he was appointed by President George W. Bush as acting assistant secretary for management for the Department of Veterans Affairs. In that position, Moorman was responsible for managing the VA's $70 billion budget and all financial, budgetary, acquisition, real property, and logistics operations. He served as the chief financial officer, chief environmental officer, and chief acquisition officer for the VA during this period. He resigned that position in order to accept his appointment as an Appellate Judge.

In November 2004, President Bush appointed Moorman to the United States Court of Appeals for Veterans Claims. Moorman was confirmed by the Senate on November 20, 2004.

Moorman and his wife, Bobbie, reside in Arlington, Virginia. They have a grown daughter and two grandchildren.

Legal offices
| Preceded by Ken Kramer | Judge of the United States Court of Appeals for Veterans Claims; 2004–2015 | Succeeded by Amanda L. Meredith |
