= Michael P. Allen =

American judge (born 1967)

Michael Allen
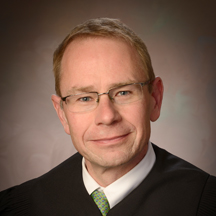

Chief Judge of the United States Court of Appeals for Veterans Claims
- Incumbent
- Assumed office September 19, 2024
- Preceded by: Margaret Bartley

Judge of the United States Court of Appeals for Veterans Claims
- Incumbent
- Assumed office August 9, 2017
- Appointed by: Donald Trump
- Preceded by: Bruce E. Kasold

Personal details
- Born: Michael Patrick Allen; 1967 (age 58–59)
- Education: University of Rochester (BA); Columbia University (JD)

Michael Patrick Allen (born 1967) is an American lawyer and academic who serves as the chief judge of the United States Court of Appeals for Veterans Claims. Prior to becoming a judge, he was a professor of law and director of the Veterans Law Institute at Stetson University College of Law.

== Biography ==
Allen received his Bachelor of Arts in American history and political science, summa cum laude, from the University of Rochester in 1989, where he was elected to Phi Beta Kappa, and his Juris Doctor from Columbia Law School in 1992, where he was a Harlan Fiske Stone Scholar.

Allen spent nine years in private practice as a civil trial attorney at the law firm Ropes & Gray in Boston, Massachusetts. He then joined the Stetson University College of Law faculty, where he taught courses in civil and constitutional law, as well as veterans' benefits law. He is a recognized expert on the law of veterans' benefits and has testified before Congress and published widely in the field.

== Court of Appeals for Veterans Claims service ==
On June 7, 2017, President Donald Trump nominated Allen to serve as a Judge of the United States Court of Appeals for Veterans Claims. A hearing on his nomination before the Senate Veterans' Affairs Committee was held on July 19, 2017. On July 20, 2017, the committee voted to report his nomination. His nomination was confirmed by the Senate with a voice vote on August 3, 2017.

Legal offices
Preceded by Bruce E. Kasold	Judge of the United States Court of Appeals for Veterans Claims; 2017–present	Incumbent
