= Joseph L. Falvey Jr. =

American judge (born 1959)

Joe Falvey
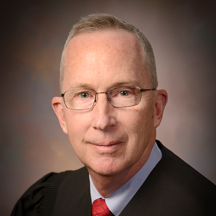

Judge of the United States Court of Appeals for Veterans Claims
- Incumbent
- Assumed office May 14, 2018
- Appointed by: Donald Trump
- Preceded by: Alan Lance

Personal details
- Born: Joseph Leo Falvey Jr. 1959 (age 66–67) Dayton, Ohio, U.S.
- Education: University of Notre Dame (BA, JD); Judge Advocate General's Legal Center and School (LLM)

Military service
- Allegiance: United States
- Branch/service: United States Marine Corps
- Years of service: 1981–1995 (active); 1995–2011 (reserve)
- Rank: Colonel
- Battles/wars: Operation Enduring Freedom
- Awards: Legion of Merit (2); Defense Meritorious Service Medal; Meritorious Service Medal; Navy and Marine Corps Commendation Medal; Joint Service Achievement Medal; Navy and Marine Corps Achievement Medal

Joseph Leo Falvey Jr. (born 1959) is an American lawyer who serves as a judge of the United States Court of Appeals for Veterans Claims.

== Education and military service ==
Falvey earned his Bachelor of Arts from the University of Notre Dame in 1981. He received his Juris Doctor, cum laude, from Notre Dame Law School in 1987, where he was editor-in-chief of the Journal of College and University Law. He earned a Master of Laws, with honors, from the Judge Advocate General's School of the Army.

He is a 30-year veteran of the United States Marine Corps, having served 14 of those years on active duty. In 2011, Falvey retired from the Marine Corps as the Commander of the Marine Corps' Reserve Legal Support Section. He previously served as a prosecutor, defense counsel, or judge in over 300 trials, and served as an appellate judge on the United States Navy-Marine Corps Court of Criminal Appeals. After the September 11 attacks, he was mobilized in support of Operation Enduring Freedom and served in Afghanistan in 2002.

== Legal career ==
Falvey served as an Assistant United States Attorney for the Eastern District of Michigan in its national security unit from 2008 to 2011. Before joining the Department of Justice, he was a professor of law at Ave Maria School of Law from 1999 to 2007 and the University of Detroit School of Law from 1994 to 1998, where he taught evidence, trial advocacy, military law, national security law, and criminal law and procedure.

== Court of Appeals for Veterans Claims ==
On January 23, 2018, President Trump announced his intent to nominate Falvey to an undetermined seat on the United States Court of Appeals for Veterans Claims. On January 24, 2018, his nomination was sent to the United States Senate. He was nominated to the seat vacated by Alan Lance, who assumed senior status on April 30, 2017. Falvey's nomination was referred to the Senate Veterans Affairs Committee. A hearing on his nomination was held on April 11, 2018. His nomination was reported out of committee by a voice vote on April 18, 2018. Falvey was confirmed by voice vote on April 26, 2018.

== Personal ==
Falvey and his wife, Anne, have nine children, and have fostered over a dozen others. He is the father of Joseph P. Falvey.

Legal offices
Preceded by Alan Lance	Judge of the United States Court of Appeals for Veterans Claims; 2018–present	Incumbent
