= Joseph L. Toth =

American judge (born 1973)

Joseph Toth
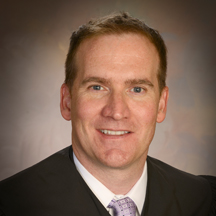

Judge of the United States Court of Appeals for Veterans Claims
- Incumbent
- Assumed office August 9, 2017
- Appointed by: Donald Trump
- Preceded by: Lawrence B. Hagel

Personal details
- Born: Joseph Leo Toth; September 1973 (age 52)
- Education: University of Chicago (BA); Ave Maria School of Law (JD)

Military service
- Allegiance: United States
- Branch/service: United States Navy
- Unit: 10th Mountain Division; Navy Judge Advocate General's Corps
- Battles/wars: War in Afghanistan
- Awards: Joint Service Commendation Medal

Joseph Leo Toth (born September 1973) is an American lawyer who serves as a judge of the United States Court of Appeals for Veterans Claims. He is a veteran of the Navy's Judge Advocate General's Corps.

== Early life and education ==
Toth received his Bachelor of Arts from the University of Chicago and his Juris Doctor from the Ave Maria School of Law.

=== Military service ===
Toth is a veteran of the U.S. Navy's Judge Advocate General's Corps. In 2011, he served as a field officer in Afghanistan, where he was stationed with the United States Army's 10th Mountain Division in the Zhari District. Toth partnered with Afghan prosecutors to establish the rule of law in the district where the Taliban was formed. He was awarded the Joint Service Commendation Medal.

Toth also served as a senior defense counsel at Naval Station Pearl Harbor, defending service members at courts-martial.

== Career ==
Toth clerked for Judge Robert J. Conrad of the United States District Court for the Western District of North Carolina and Judge Daniel Anthony Manion of the United States Court of Appeals for the Seventh Circuit.

Toth served as an associate federal public defender in Milwaukee, Wisconsin.

=== Court of Appeals for Veterans Claims ===
On June 7, 2017, President Donald Trump nominated Toth to serve as a Judge of the United States Court of Appeals for Veterans Claims. A hearing on his nomination before the Senate Veterans Affairs Committee was held on July 19, 2017. On July 20, 2017, the committee voted to report his nomination. His nomination was confirmed by the Senate with a voice vote on August 3, 2017.

Legal offices
Preceded by Lawrence B. Hagel	Judge of the United States Court of Appeals for Veterans Claims; 2017–present	Incumbent
