= United States Court of Appeals for Veterans Claims =

Specialized federal appeals court

- (Vet. App.)
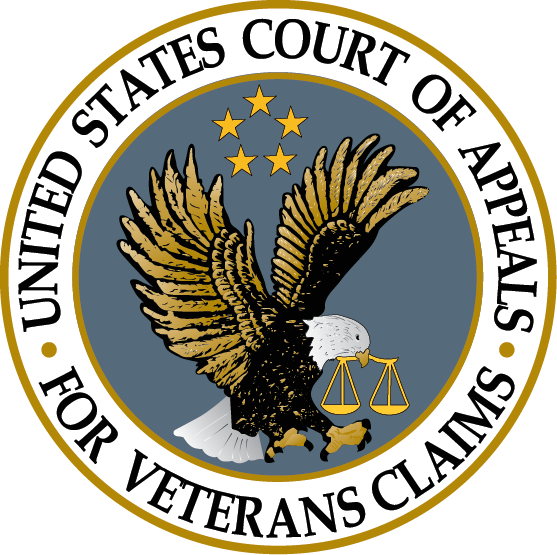
- Location: Washington, D.C.
- Appeals to: Federal Circuit
- Appeals from: Board of Veterans' Appeals
- Established: November 18, 1988
- Authority: Article I tribunal
- Created by: 38 U.S.C. §§ 7251–7299
- Composition method: Presidential nomination with Senate advice and consent
- Judges: 7 (3 add'l temporary seats)
- Judge term length: 15 years
- Chief Judge: Michael P. Allen
- www.uscourts.cavc.gov

The United States Court of Appeals for Veterans Claims (in case citations, Vet. App.) is a federal court of record that was established under Article I of the United States Constitution, and is thus referred to as an Article I tribunal (court). The court has exclusive national jurisdiction to provide independent federal judicial oversight and review of final decisions of the Board of Veterans' Appeals.

== Overview ==
The United States Court of Appeals for Veterans Claims is commonly referred to as the Veterans Court, USCAVC, or simply CAVC. The court was previously known as the United States Court of Veterans Appeals, but was changed to the current name by the Veterans Programs Enhancement Act on March 1, 1999 (Pub.L. No. 105-368).

The Veterans Court is located in Washington, D.C. but may sit anywhere in the United States. While the Board of Veterans' Appeals is part of the United States Department of Veterans Affairs, the Veterans Court is not a part of the VA, it is an independent federal court. The Veterans Court hears oral arguments and reviews final Board decisions, the record before the agency, and briefs of the parties on appeal. Each judge on the Court serves a 15-year term.

== History ==
The U.S. Court of Appeals for Veterans Claims was created on November 18, 1988, by the Veterans' Judicial Review Act of 1988. Prior to the establishment of the U.S. Court of Appeals for Veterans Claims, from the U.S. Revolutionary War to 1988, there was no judicial recourse for veterans who were denied benefits. The United States Department of Veterans Affairs, formerly titled the Veterans Administration, was the only federal administrative agency that operated without independent judicial oversight. The Board of Veterans' Appeals, which is a part of the Department of Veterans Affairs, provided the final decision in a veteran's claim for benefits.

Veterans, advocacy groups, and veterans service organizations fought and urged Congress to provide judicial review of VA decisions since the 1950s. The lack of judicial review persisted, however, until the increase in veterans claims following the Vietnam War. The struggles of these veterans to obtain VA benefits highlighted the lack of independent oversight in the adjudication process. The House Committee on Veterans' Affairs initially resisted, noting that the Department of Veterans Affairs stood in "splendid isolation as the single federal administrative agency whose major functions were explicitly insulated from judicial review."

After decades of debate, on November 18, 1988, Congress created the United States Court of Veterans Appeals. On March 1, 1999, the Court's name was changed from the United States Court of Veterans Appeals to the United States Court of Appeals for Veterans Claims through the Veterans Programs Enhancement Act (Pub.L. No. 105-368).

From 1990 to 2016, thirteen of the seventeen jurists who served on the CAVC had been veterans. Of the nine current active judges, six are veterans.

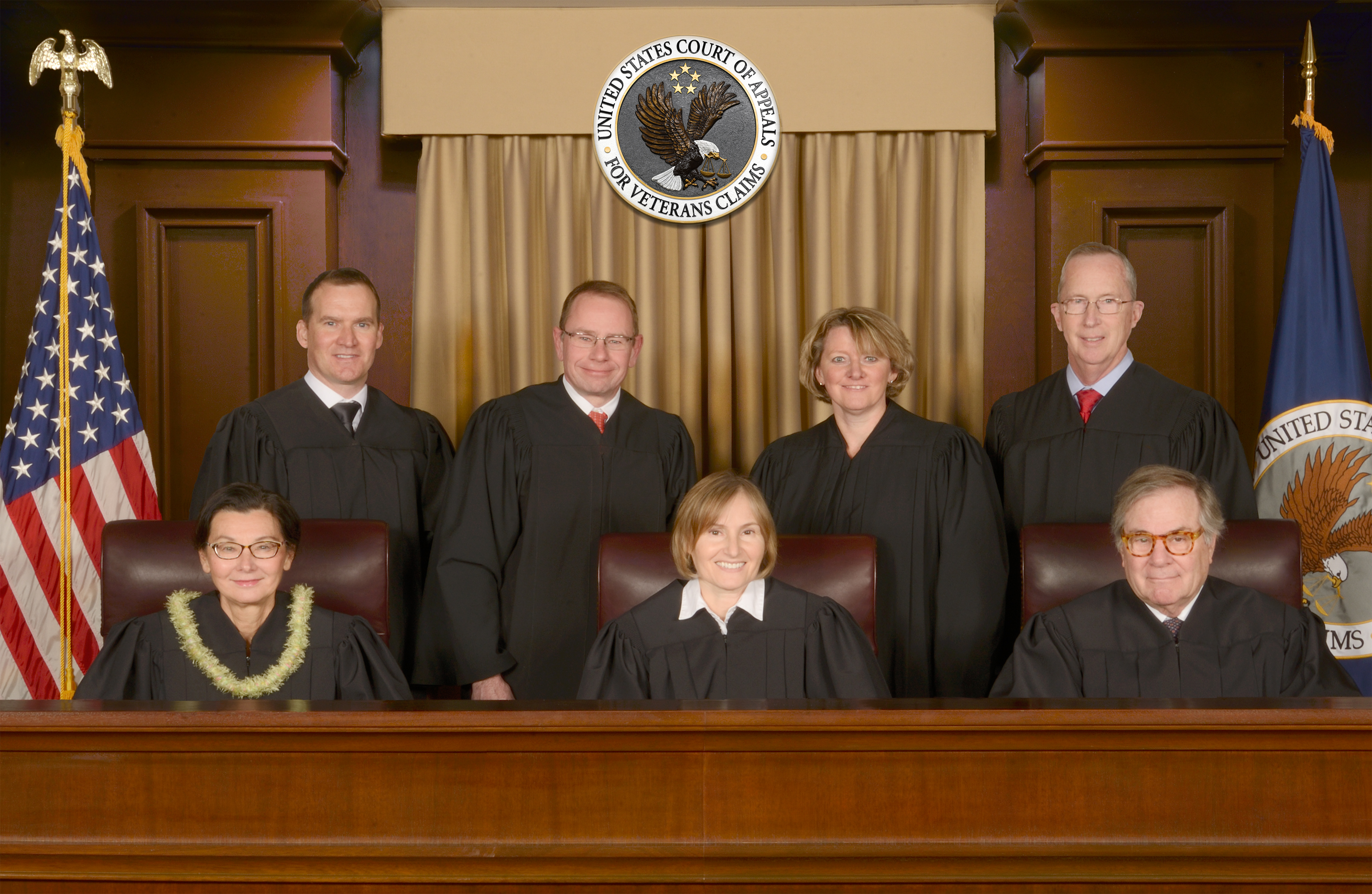
The Judges of the United States Court of Appeals for Veterans Claims – December 2019

== Jurisdiction ==
The U.S. Court of Appeals for Veterans Claims has "exclusive jurisdiction to review decisions of the Board of Veterans' Appeals ... [with the] power to affirm, modify, or reverse a decision of the Board [of Veterans' Appeals] or to remand the matter, as appropriate."

== Judges ==
Judges are appointed to the U.S. Court of Appeals for Veterans Claims by the president of the United States and confirmed by the United States Senate, in the same manner as Article III judges. They are appointed to serve fifteen-year appointments. Retired judges are routinely recalled to active service to assist the Court in issuing its decisions in a timely manner.

== Current composition ==
As of July 8, 2026:

#	Title	Judge	Duty station	Born	Term of service			Appointed by
#	Title	Judge	Duty station	Born	Active	Chief	Senior	Appointed by
18	Chief Judge	Michael P. Allen	Washington, D.C.	1967	2017–present	2024–present	—	Trump
15	Judge	Coral Wong Pietsch	Washington, D.C.	1947	2012–present	—	—	Obama
19	Judge	Amanda L. Meredith	Washington, D.C.	1972	2017–present	—	—	Trump
20	Judge	Joseph L. Toth	Washington, D.C.	1973	2017–present	—	—	Trump
21	Judge	Joseph L. Falvey Jr.	Washington, D.C.	1959	2018–present	—	—	Trump
22	Judge	Scott J. Laurer	Washington, D.C.	1965	2020–present	—	—	Trump
23	Judge	Grant C. Jaquith	Washington, D.C.	1957	2020–present	—	—	Trump
24	Judge	vacant	Washington, D.C.	—	—	—	—	—
25	Judge	vacant	Washington, D.C.	—	—	—	—	—
26	Judge	vacant	Washington, D.C.	—	—	—	—	—
3	Senior Judge	Ken Kramer	Washington, D.C.	1942	1989–2004	2000–2004	2004–present	G.H.W. Bush
5	Senior Judge	Ronald M. Holdaway	Washington, D.C.	1934	1990–2002	—	2002–present	G.H.W. Bush
8	Senior Judge	William P. Greene Jr.	Washington, D.C.	1943	1997–2010	2005–2010	2010–present	Clinton
9	Senior Judge	Lawrence B. Hagel	Washington, D.C.	1947	2003–2016	2015–2016	2016–present	G.W. Bush
10	Senior Judge	Bruce E. Kasold	Washington, D.C.	1951	2003–2016	2010–2015	2016–present	G.W. Bush
11	Senior Judge	William A. Moorman	Washington, D.C.	1945	2004–2015	—	2015–present	G.W. Bush
12	Senior Judge	Robert N. Davis	Washington, D.C.	1953	2004–2019	2016–2019	2019–present	G.W. Bush
13	Senior Judge	Alan Lance	Washington, D.C.	1949	2004–2017	—	2017–present	G.W. Bush
14	Senior Judge	Mary J. Schoelen	Washington, D.C.	1968	2004–2019	—	2019–present	G.W. Bush
16	Senior Judge	Margaret Bartley	Washington, D.C.	1959	2012–2026	2019–2024	2026–present	Obama

== Vacancies and pending nominations ==
Seat	Prior judge's duty station	Seat last held by	Vacancy reason	Date of vacancy	Nominee	Date of nomination
12	Washington, D.C.	New seat	—	December 23, 2024	David Jones	July 14, 2026
11	Washington, D.C.	William S. Greenberg	Death	March 16, 2026	Daniel F. Rendleman	July 14, 2026
10	Washington, D.C.	Margaret Bartley	Senior status	2026	Robert Fleck	July 14, 2026
4	Washington, D.C.	Coral Wong Pietsch	Term expiration	2027	James Lewis Quinn	September 14, 2026

== Former judges ==
#	Judge	State	Born–died	Active service	Chief Judge	Senior status	Appointed by	Reason for termination
1	Frank Q. Nebeker	DC	1930–2024	1989–2000	1989–2000	2000–2021	G.H.W. Bush	retirement
2	John J. Farley III	NY	1942–present	1989–2004	—	2004–2012	G.H.W. Bush	retirement
4	Hart T. Mankin	DE	1924–1996	1990–1995	—	1995–1996	G.H.W. Bush	death
6	Jonathan R. Steinberg	MD	1939–2015	1990–2005	—	—	G.H.W. Bush	expiration of term
7	Donald L. Ivers	NM	1941–present	1990–2005	2004–2005	2005–2017	G.H.W. Bush	retirement
17	William S. Greenberg	NJ	1941–2026	2012–2026	—	—	Obama	death

== Succession of seats ==
Seat 1
Nebeker	-	1989–2000
Lance	ID	2004–2017
Falvey, Jr.	MI	2018–present

Seat 2
Farley III	-	1989–2004
Schoelen	DC	2004–2019
Laurer	VA	2020–present

Seat 3
Kramer	CO	1989–2004
Moorman	VA	2004–2015
Meredith	VA	2017–present

Seat 4
Mankin	DE	1990–1995
Greene, Jr.	-	1997–2010
Pietsch	DC	2012–present

Seat 5
Holdaway	-	1990–2002
Hagel	VA	2003–2016
Toth	WI	2017–present

Seat 6
Steinberg	-	1990–2005
Seat abolished 2005, upon expiration of term

Seat 7
Ivers	-	1990–2005
Seat abolished 2005, upon expiration of term

Seat 8
Kasold	VA	2003–2016
Allen	FL	2017–present

Seat 9
Davis	FL	2004–2019
Jaquith	NY	2020–present

Seat 10
Bartley	MD	2012–2026
vacant	-	2026–present

Seat 11
Greenberg	NJ	2012–2026
vacant	-	2026–present

Seat 12
vacant	-	2024–present
