= Jonathan R. Steinberg =

American judge (1939–2015)

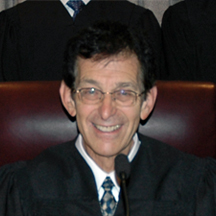

Judge of the United States Court of Appeals for Veterans Claims
- In office 1990–2005
- Nominated by: George H. W. Bush
- Preceded by: Seat established
- Succeeded by: Seat abolished

Personal details
- Born: 1939
- Died: December 21, 2015

Jonathan R. Steinberg (1939 – December 21, 2015) was an American lawyer who served as a judge of the United States Court of Appeals for Veterans Claims.

Steinberg was nominated by the President George H. W. Bush and confirmed by the United States Senate as a judge of the United States Court of Appeals for Veterans Claims in August 1990.

Prior to his appointment to the court, Steinberg served as chief counsel and staff director for the Committee on Veterans' Affairs of the United States Senate.

Steinberg graduated in the 206th Class of Central High School in Philadelphia; received his Bachelor of Arts degree from Cornell University in 1960; and his Bachelor of Laws degree cum laude from the University of Pennsylvania School of Law in 1963. At the law school, he served as research and note editor of the law review and was a member of the Order of the Coif. He clerked at the law firm of Steinberg, Richman, Greenstein and Price in Philadelphia and served as a research assistant at the American Law Institute, prior to serving as a law clerk for then circuit judge Warren E. Burger on the United States Court of Appeals for the District of Columbia Circuit in 1963–64. He commenced a tour at the Peace Corps as an attorney advisor from 1964 to 1968, and then served as the Peace Corps deputy general counsel from 1968 to 1969.

From 1969, until his appointment to the court, Steinberg served on the United States Senate staff under U.S. Senator Alan Cranston (Calif.) as counsel to the Committee on Labor and Public Welfare (Subcommittee on Veterans' Affairs, Subcommittee on Railroad Retirement, and Special Subcommittee on human resources) 1969–77; as chief counsel and staff director, Committee on Veterans' Affairs, 1977–81 and 1987–90; and as minority chief counsel and staff director, Committee on Veterans' Affairs, 1981–87.

Steinberg served as chief judge and retired in August 2005 from the U.S. Court of Appeals for Veterans Claims. He later served in recall status. He was married and had two children. He died on December 21, 2015.
