= Coral Wong Pietsch =

U.S. judge and former Brigadier General (born 1947)

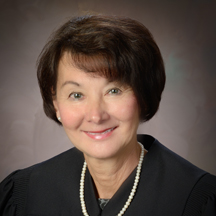

Judge of the United States Court of Appeals for Veterans Claims
- Incumbent
- Assumed office June 28, 2012
- Appointed by: Barack Obama
- Preceded by: Bill Greene

Personal details
- Born: Coral Wong; November 11, 1947 (age 78) Waterloo, Iowa, U.S.
- Spouse: James Pietsch (m. 1972)
- Education: College of Saint Teresa (BFA); Marquette University (MFA); Catholic University (JD)

Military service
- Branch/service: United States Army
- Years of service: 1974–2007
- Rank: Brigadier General
- Unit: Army Judge Advocate General's Corps; United States Army Reserve
- Battles/wars: Iraq War
- Awards: Army Distinguished Service Medal; Legion of Merit

Coral Wong Pietsch (née Wong; born November 11, 1947) is an American lawyer who serves as a judge of the United States Court of Appeals for Veterans Claims. She is a former brigadier general in the United States Army Reserve. In 2001 she became the first female general officer in the Army Judge Advocate General's (JAG) Corps, and the first Asian-American woman to reach general officer rank in the United States Army.

== Biography ==
Pietsch was born in Waterloo, Iowa, to a Chinese immigrant father from Canton, China, who had come to the United States to start a Chinese restaurant, and a Czech American mother. After earning a bachelor's degree in theatre from the College of Saint Teresa, and later a master's degree in drama from Marquette University, she went on to attend the Catholic University of America for law school, graduating in 1974. There she would meet her future husband, James Pietsch, an army officer who was also attending to become a lawyer.

Commissioned into the Judge Advocate General's Corps in 1974, she was assigned to Eighth Army in Korea then to Fort Shafter, Hawaii, completing her active duty requirement, and transferring to the Army Reserves. After active duty, she settled down and began to reside in Hawaii with her husband and became a civilian attorney for U.S. Army Pacific. While a reservist she had been deployed to Johnston Atoll, Japan, the Philippines, Washington D.C., and Iraq. She was a chair commissioner of the Hawaii Civil Rights Commission, with her term expiring while deployed. In 2001 she became the first female general officer in the Army Judge Advocate General's (JAG) Corps, and the first Asian-American woman to reach the rank of general in the United States Army.

On November 1, 2011, President Obama nominated her to the United States Court of Appeals for Veterans Claims as his replacement for Judge William P. Greene, who had reached the end of his 15-year term. She was confirmed by the Senate on May 24, 2012.

== Recognition ==
2017 – BG Coral Wong Pietsch was inducted into the U.S. Army Women's Foundation Hall of Fame.

Legal offices
Preceded by Bill Greene	Judge of the United States Court of Appeals for Veterans Claims; 2012–present	Incumbent
