= List of Department of Agriculture appointments by Donald Trump =

Key
Appointees serving in offices that did not require Senate confirmation.
Appointees confirmed by the Senate who are currently serving or served through the entire term.
Appointees awaiting Senate confirmation.
Appointees serving in an acting capacity.
Appointees who have left office after confirmation or offices which have been disbanded.
Nominees who were withdrawn prior to being confirmed or assuming office.

== Appointments (first administration) ==
Office	Nominee	Assumed office	Left office
Secretary of Agriculture	Sonny Perdue	April 25, 2017 (Confirmed April 24, 2017, 87–11)	January 20, 2021
Deputy Secretary of Agriculture	Stephen Censky	October 10, 2017 (Confirmed October 3, 2017, voice vote)	November 8, 2020
Office of the Secretary
General Counsel of Agriculture	Stephen Vaden	December 14, 2018 (Confirmed November 27, 2018, 53–46)	December 21, 2020
General Counsel of Agriculture	Stephen Vaden	March 17, 2017	September 5, 2017
Chief Financial Officer of Agriculture	Scott Soles	Nomination lapsed and returned to the President on January 3, 2021	
Principal Deputy Chief Financial Officer of Agriculture	Scott Soles	August 13, 2019	January 20, 2021
Farm Production and Conservation
Under Secretary of Agriculture (Farm and Foreign Agricultural Services)	Bill Northey	March 6, 2018 (Confirmed February 27, 2018, voice vote)	January 20, 2021
Member of the Board of Directors of the Commodity Credit Corporation	Gary Washington	June 2018	
Food, Nutrition, and Consumer Services
Under Secretary of Agriculture (Food, Nutrition, and Consumer Services)	Brandon Lipps	Nomination lapsed and returned to the President on January 3, 2021	
Deputy Under Secretary of Agriculture for Food, Nutrition, and Consumer Services	Brandon Lipps	August 19, 2019	January 20, 2021
Food Safety
Under Secretary of Agriculture (Food Safety)	Mindy Brashears	March 23, 2020 (Confirmed March 23, 2020, voice vote)	January 20, 2021
Marketing and Regulatory Programs
Under Secretary of Agriculture (Marketing and Regulatory Programs)	Greg Ibach	October 30, 2017 (Confirmed October 26, 2017, voice vote)	January 20, 2021
Natural Resources and Environment
Under Secretary of Agriculture (Natural Resources and Environment)	James E. Hubbard	September 7, 2018 (Confirmed August 28, 2018, voice vote)	January 20, 2021
Research, Education, and Economics
Under Secretary of Agriculture (Research, Education, and Economics)	Scott H. Hutchins	Nomination lapsed and returned to the President on January 3, 2021	
Deputy Under Secretary of Agriculture for Research, Education, and Economics	Scott H. Hutchins	January 29, 2019	January 20, 2021
Director of the National Institute of Food and Agriculture	J. Scott Angle	October 29, 2018 (Appointed September 2018)	January 20, 2021
Rural Development
Under Secretary of Agriculture (Rural Development)	Vacant		
Deputy Under Secretary of Agriculture for Rural Development	Vacant		
Administrator of the Rural Utilities Service	Kenneth Johnson	April 30, 2018 (Appointed February 8, 2018)	January 20, 2021
Trade and Foreign Agriculture Affairs
Under Secretary of Agriculture (Trade and Foreign Agricultural Affairs)	Ted McKinney	October 10, 2017 (Confirmed October 3, 2017, voice vote)	January 20, 2021
Office of Civil Rights
Assistant Secretary of Agriculture (Civil Rights)	Naomi C. Earp	Nomination lapsed and returned to the President on January 3, 2020	
Deputy Assistant Secretary of Agriculture for Civil Rights	Naomi C. Earp	January 28, 2019	January 31, 2020
Office of Congressional Relations
Assistant Secretary of Agriculture (Congressional Relations)	Ken Barbic	May 7, 2018 (Confirmed April 26, 2018, voice vote)	January 20, 2021

== Appointments (second administration) ==
Office	Nominee	Assumed office	Left office
Secretary of Agriculture	Brooke Rollins	February 13, 2025 (Confirmed February 13, 2025, 72–28)	
Secretary of Agriculture	Gary Washington	January 20, 2025	February 13, 2025
Deputy Secretary of Agriculture	Stephen Vaden	July 7, 2025 (Confirmed June 10, 2025, 51–44)	
General Counsel of Agriculture	Tyler Clarkson	August 4, 2025 (Confirmed July 31, 2025, 52–45)	
Chief Financial Officer of Agriculture	Todd Lindsey	Awaiting Senate Confirmation	
Under Secretary of Agriculture for Farm Production and Conservation	Richard Fordyce	September 25, 2025 (Confirmed* September 18, 2025, 51–44); *En bloc confirmation of 48 nominees.	
Under Secretary of Agriculture for Marketing and Regulatory Programs	Dudley Hoskins	September 23, 2025 (Confirmed* September 18, 2025, 51–44); *En bloc confirmation of 48 nominees.	
Under Secretary of Agriculture for Natural Resources and Environment	Michael Boren	January 20, 2026 (Confirmed* October 7, 2025, 51–47); *En bloc confirmation of 107 nominees.	
Under Secretary of Agriculture for Research, Education, and Economics	Scott H. Hutchins	September 18, 2025 (Confirmed* September 18, 2025, 51–44); *En bloc confirmation of 48 nominees.	
Under Secretary of Agriculture for Trade and Foreign Agricultural Affairs	Gregory Ibach	Awaiting Senate Confirmation	
Under Secretary of Agriculture for Trade and Foreign Agricultural Affairs	Luke J. Lindberg	August 4, 2025 (Confirmed August 2, 2025, 78-17)	September 18, 2026
Under Secretary of Agriculture for Food Safety	Mindy Brashears	January 14, 2026 (Confirmed* December 18, 2025, 53–43); *En bloc confirmation of 97 nominees.	
Under Secretary of Agriculture for Rural Development	Glen R. Smith	August 21, 2026 (Confirmed* August 7, 2026, 51–47); *En bloc confirmation of 74 nominees.	
Assistant Secretary of Agriculture for Civil Rights	Devon Westhill	October 15, 2025 (Confirmed* October 7, 2025, 51–47); *En bloc confirmation of 107 nominees.	
Assistant Secretary of Agriculture for Congressional Affairs	Yvette Herrell	December 19, 2025 (Confirmed* December 18, 2025, 53–43); *En bloc confirmation of 97 nominees.	
Inspector General of the United States Department of Agriculture	John Walk	January 5, 2026 (Confirmed* December 18, 2025, 53–43); *En bloc confirmation of 97 nominees.	
Inspector General of the United States Department of Agriculture	Janet M. Sorensen	February 23, 2025	January 5, 2026

== Notes ==
=== Confirmation votes ===
Confirmations by roll call vote (first administration)

Confirmations by voice vote (first administration)

Confirmations by roll call vote (second administration)

Confirmations by voice vote (second administration)
