= List of Department of Agriculture appointments by Joe Biden =

Below is a list of nominations and appointments to the Department of Agriculture by Joe Biden, the 46th president of the United States. As of February 26, 2024, according to tracking by The Washington Post and Partnership for Public Service, 10 nominees have been confirmed, 1 nominee is being considered by the Senate, 3 positions do not have a nominee, 19 appointments have been made to positions that don't require Senate confirmation, and 5 positions do not have an appointee.

== Color key ==
Denotes appointees awaiting Senate confirmation.

Denotes appointees serving in an acting capacity.

Denotes appointees who have left office or offices which have been disbanded.

== Leadership ==
Office	Nominee	Assumed office	Left office
— Secretary of Agriculture	Tom Vilsack	February 24, 2021 (Confirmed February 23, 2021, 92–7)	—
— Deputy Secretary of Agriculture	Xochitl Torres Small	July 17, 2023 (Confirmed July 11, 2023, 84–8)	—
— Deputy Secretary of Agriculture	Jewel H. Bronaugh	May 17, 2021 (Confirmed May 13, 2021 by voice vote)	March 3, 2023

== Office of the Secretary ==
Office	Nominee	Assumed office	Left office
— General Counsel of Agriculture	Janie Simms Hipp	August 1, 2021 (Confirmed July 30, 2021 by voice vote)	July 31, 2023
— Deputy Chief Financial Officer of Agriculture	Lynn Moaney	January 20, 2021	—
— Assistant Secretary of Agriculture (Administration)	Oscar Gonzales	March 29, 2021	February 2023

== Farm Production and Conservation ==
Office	Nominee	Assumed office	Left office
— Under Secretary of Agriculture (Farm Production and Conservation)	Robert Bonnie	November 19, 2021 (Confirmed November 16, 2021, 76–19)	—
— Deputy Under Secretary of Agriculture (Farm Production and Conservation)	Gloria Montaño Greene	February 22, 2021	—

== Food, Nutrition and Consumer Services ==
Office	Nominee	Assumed office	Left office
— Deputy Under Secretary of Agriculture (Food, Nutrition, and Consumer Services)	Stacy Dean	January 21, 2021	—

== Food Safety ==
Office	Nominee	Assumed office	Left office
— Under Secretary of Agriculture (Food Safety)	Jose Emilio Esteban	January 4, 2023 (Confirmed December 22, 2022 by voice vote)	—
— Deputy Under Secretary of Agriculture (Food Safety)	Sandra Eskin	March 16, 2021	—

== Marketing and Regulatory Programs ==
Office	Nominee	Assumed office	Left office
— Under Secretary of Agriculture (Marketing and Regulatory Programs)	Jennifer Moffitt	August 13, 2021 (Confirmed August 11, 2021 by voice vote)	—
— Deputy Under Secretary (Marketing and Regulatory Programs)	Mae Wu	January 21, 2021	—
— Deputy Under Secretary (Marketing and Regulatory Programs)	Katie Zenk	November 2022	—

== Natural Resources and Environment ==
Office	Nominee	Assumed office	Left office
— Under Secretary of Agriculture (Natural Resources and Environment)	Homer Wilkes	February 11, 2022 (Confirmed February 8, 2022 by voice vote)	—
— Deputy Under Secretary of Agriculture (Natural Resources and Environment)	Meryl Harrell	May 24, 2021	—

== Research, Education, and Economics ==
Office	Nominee	Assumed office	Left office
— Under Secretary of Agriculture (Research, Education, and Economics)	Chavonda Jacobs-Young	June 8, 2022 (Confirmed June 7, 2022, 95–4)	—
— Deputy Under Secretary of Agriculture (Research, Education, and Economics)	Sanah Baig	November 2022	—
— Deputy Under Secretary of Agriculture (Research, Education, and Economics)	Shefali Mehta	November 15, 2021	July 2022

== Rural Development ==
Office	Nominee	Assumed office	Left office
— Under Secretary of Agriculture (Rural Development)	Basil Gooden	March 4, 2024 (Confirmed February 26, 2024 by voice vote)	—
— Under Secretary of Agriculture (Rural Development)	Xochitl Torres Small	October 13, 2021 (Confirmed October 7, 2021 by voice vote)	July 17, 2023
— Deputy Under Secretary (Rural Development)	Farah Ahmad	August 2022	—
— Deputy Under Secretary (Rural Development)	Justin Maxson	January 21, 2021	August 2022

== Trade and Foreign Agriculture Affairs ==
Office	Nominee	Assumed office	Left office
— Under Secretary of Agriculture (Trade and Foreign Agricultural Affairs)	Alexis Taylor	December 29, 2022 (Confirmed December 21, 2022 by voice vote)	January 16, 2025

== Office of Congressional Relations ==
Office	Nominee	Assumed office	Left office
— Assistant Secretary of Agriculture (Congressional Relations)	Adrienne Wojciechowski	November 10, 2021 (Confirmed November 3, 2021 by voice vote)	—
— Deputy Assistant Secretary of Agriculture (Congressional Relations)	Eric Deeble	July 5, 2022	—
— Deputy Assistant Secretary of Agriculture (Congressional Relations)	Anne Knapke	February 15, 2021	December 2021
— Legislative Director	Jasmine Dickerson	February 15, 2021	2022

== Office of Civil Rights ==
Office	Nominee	Assumed office	Left office
— Deputy Assistant Secretary of Agriculture (Civil Rights)	Monica Rainge	February 4, 2021	—

== USDA Agencies, Corporations & Services ==
Office	Nominee	Assumed office	Left office
Farm Service Agency
— Administrator of the Farm Service Agency	Zach Ducheneaux	February 22, 2021	—
Agricultural Marketing Service
— Administrator of the Agricultural Marketing Service	Bruce Summers	July 30, 2021	—
Agricultural Research Service
— Administrator of the Agricultural Research Service	Simon Liu	February 1, 2023	—
Foreign Agricultural Service
— Administrator of the Foreign Agricultural Service	Daniel Whitley	July 22, 2021	—
Rural Housing Service
— Administrator of the Rural Housing Service	Joaquin Altoro	November 8, 2021	—
Rural Utilities Service
— Administrator of the Rural Utilities Service	Andy Berke	October 6, 2022	—
Rural Business-Cooperative Service
— Administrator of the Rural Business-Cooperative Service	Karama Neal	April 26, 2021	—
U.S. Forest Service
— Chief of the U.S. Forest Service	Randy Moore	July 26, 2021	—

== Withdrawn nominations ==
Office	Appointee	Announced	Withdrawn	Notes
— Chief Financial Officer of Agriculture	Jon M. Holladay	July 25, 2023	January 3, 2025	Nomination not resent
— Under Secretary of Agriculture (Food, Nutrition, and Consumer Services)	Stacy Dean	May 13, 2022	January 3, 2024	Nomination not resent
— Assistant Secretary of Agriculture (Civil Rights)	Margo Schlanger	September 16, 2021	January 3, 2024	Nomination not resent

== See also ==
- Cabinet of Joe Biden, for the vetting process undergone by top-level roles including advice and consent by the Senate
- List of executive branch 'czars' e.g. Special Advisor to the President

== Notes ==
Confirmation votes

Confirmations by roll call vote

Confirmations by voice vote
