= Brashears =

Brashears may refer to:

- Brashears, Arkansas, an unincorporated community in Madison County, Arkansas, United States
- James R. Brashears (1858–1917), American lawyer, politician and judge
- Mindy Brashears (born 1970), American administrator

== See also ==
- Brashear (disambiguation)
