= Wheeler, Texas =

- City
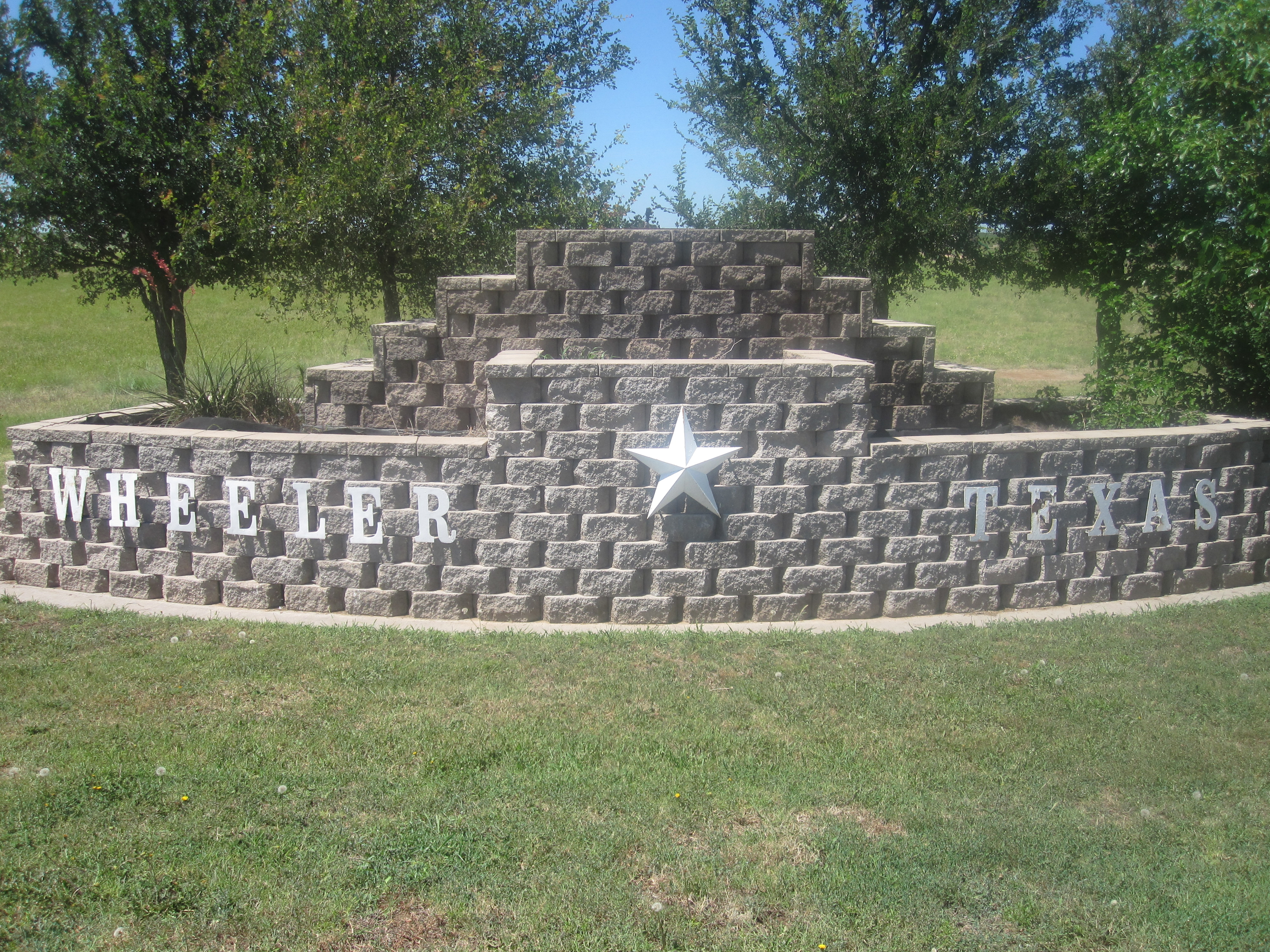
- Wheeler welcome sign

- Location in Wheeler County and the state of Texas

- Location in the United States
- Coordinates: 35°26′43″N 100°16′15″W
- Country: United States
- State: Texas
- County: Wheeler

Area
  - Total: 1.53 sq mi (3.96 km^{2})
  - Land: 1.53 sq mi (3.96 km^{2})
  - Water: 0 sq mi (0.00 km^{2})
- Elevation: 2,507 ft (764 m)

Population (2020)
  - Total: 1,487
  - Density: 973/sq mi (376/km^{2})
- Time zone: UTC-06:00 (CST)
  - Summer (DST): UTC-05:00 (CDT)
- ZIP code: 79096
- Area code: 806
- FIPS code: 48-78208
- Website: wheelertexas.org

Wheeler is a city in and the county seat of Wheeler County, Texas, United States, located on the eastern border of the Texas Panhandle. The population was last reported at 1,487 in the 2020 census.

== History ==
Both the town of Wheeler and Wheeler County are named for Royall Tyler Wheeler, who was a Chief Justice of the Texas Supreme Court.

== Geography ==
The town is positioned three miles northwest of the center of the county, 100 miles east of Amarillo, and 12 miles west of the Texas-Oklahoma states' line. According to the United States Census Bureau, Wheeler has a total township-area of 1.5 square miles (4.0 km^{2}), all land.

=== Climate ===
According to the Köppen climate classification system, Wheeler has a semiarid climate, BSk on climate maps.

== Demographics ==
Historical population
Census	Pop.	Note	%±
1930	931		—
1940	848		−8.9%
1950	904		6.6%
1960	1,174		29.9%
1970	1,116		−4.9%
1980	1,584		41.9%
1990	1,393		−12.1%
2000	1,378		−1.1%
2010	1,592		15.5%
2020	1,487		−6.6%
U.S. Decennial Census

=== 2020 census ===
As of the 2020 census, Wheeler had a population of 1,487, 539 households, and 415 families residing in the city. The median age was 39.3 years; 26.4% of residents were under the age of 18 and 19.8% of residents were 65 years of age or older. For every 100 females there were 94.9 males, and for every 100 females age 18 and over there were 88.9 males age 18 and over.

0.0% of residents lived in urban areas, while 100.0% lived in rural areas.

Of the 539 households in Wheeler, 41.2% had children under the age of 18 living in them. Of all households, 59.7% were married-couple households, 12.8% were households with a male householder and no spouse or partner present, and 23.9% were households with a female householder and no spouse or partner present. About 21.7% of all households were made up of individuals and 10.9% had someone living alone who was 65 years of age or older.

There were 642 housing units, of which 16.0% were vacant. The homeowner vacancy rate was 3.0% and the rental vacancy rate was 18.4%.

Racial composition as of the 2020 census
Race	Number	Percent
White	872	58.6%
Black or African American	6	0.4%
American Indian and Alaska Native	14	0.9%
Asian	1	0.1%
Native Hawaiian and Other Pacific Islander	0	0.0%
Some other race	308	20.7%
Two or more races	286	19.2%
Hispanic or Latino (of any race)	656	44.1%

=== 2000 census ===
As of the census of 2000, 1,378 people, 520 households, and 365 families resided in the city. The population density was 900.4 inhabitants per square mile (347.6/km^{2}). The 612 housing units averaged 399.9 per square mile (154.4/km^{2}). The racial makeup of the city was 85.05% White, 1.81% African American, 0.44% Native American, 0.15% Asian, 10.60% from other races, and 1.96% from two or more races. Hispanics or Latinos of any race were 18.07% of the population.

Of the 520 households, 33.5% had children under the age of 18 living with them, 58.8% were married couples living together, 8.5% had a female householder with no husband present, and 29.8% were not families. About 28.3% of all households were made up of individuals, and 18.5% had someone living alone who was 65 years of age or older. The average household size was 2.48 and the average family size was 3.04.

In the city, the population was distributed as 25.0% under the age of 18, 8.4% from 18 to 24, 21.4% from 25 to 44, 23.4% from 45 to 64, and 21.8% who were 65 years of age or older. The median age was 41 years. For every 100 females, there were 88.0 males. For every 100 females age 18 and over, there were 83.7 males.

The median income for a household in the city was $31,375, and for a family was $36,667. Males had a median income of $27,679 versus $16,723 for females. The per capita income for the city was $17,224. About 6.8% of families and 10.2% of the population were below the poverty line, including 12.6% of those under age 18 and 10.7% of those age 65 or over.

== Education ==
Wheeler Public Schools are part of the Wheeler Independent School District. One elementary school, one junior high school, and one high school (Wheeler High School) serve the district.

== Notable people ==
- Alan Bean, NASA astronaut, artist, and, as a member of Apollo 12 became the fourth man to walk on the Moon.
- Mindy Brashears, the former Under Secretary for Food Safety at the U.S. Department of Agriculture
- Jack Frye, Aviation Pioneer and President of TWA was raised and is buried in Wheeler
- John B. Harrison, a native of Texas, attorney, served as County Judge for Wheeler County until he moved to what would become Oklahoma Territory in 1896
- Don Rives, a linebacker for Texas Tech and the Chicago Bears, was born in Wheeler

== Gallery ==
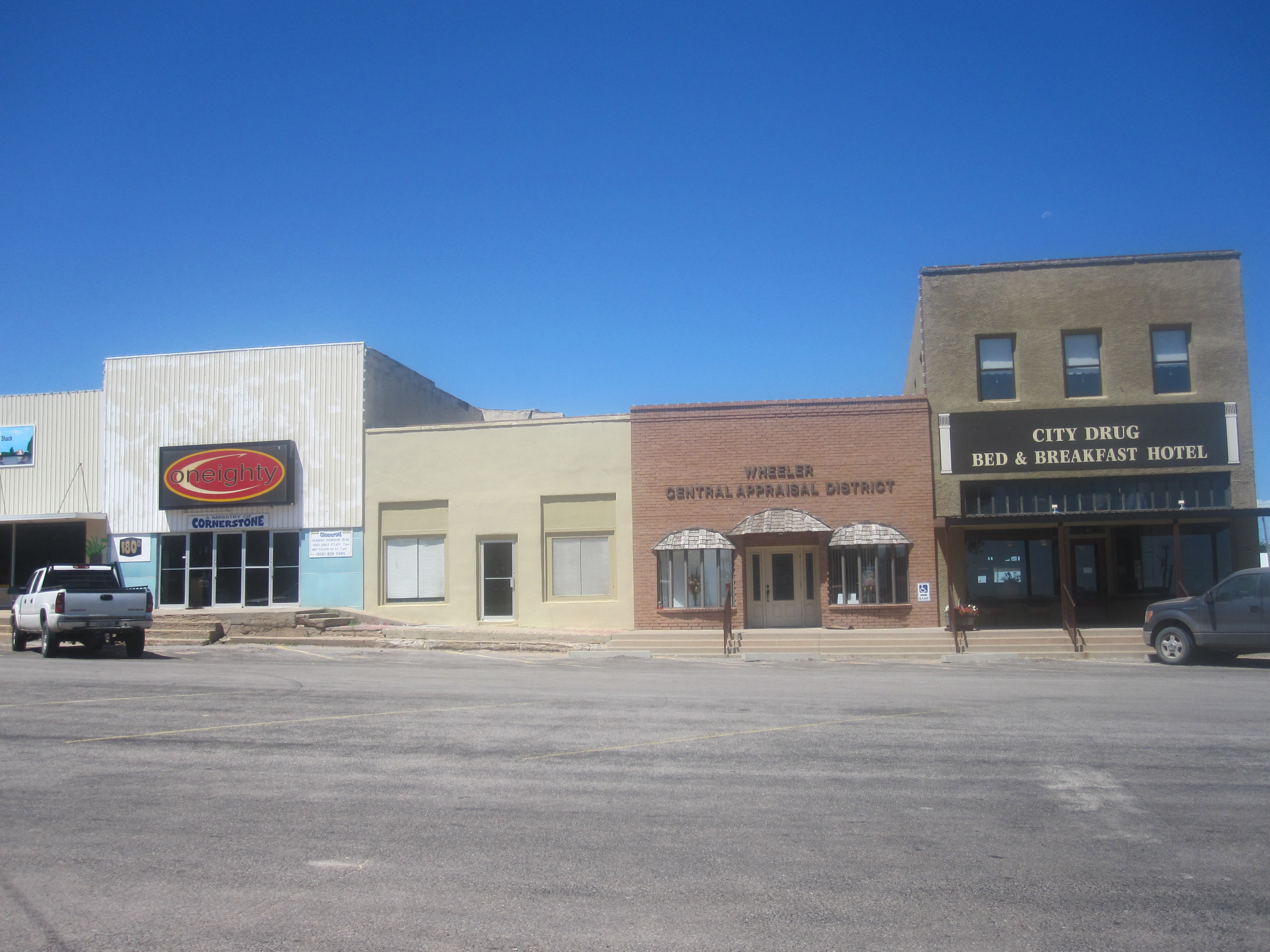
Downtown Wheeler

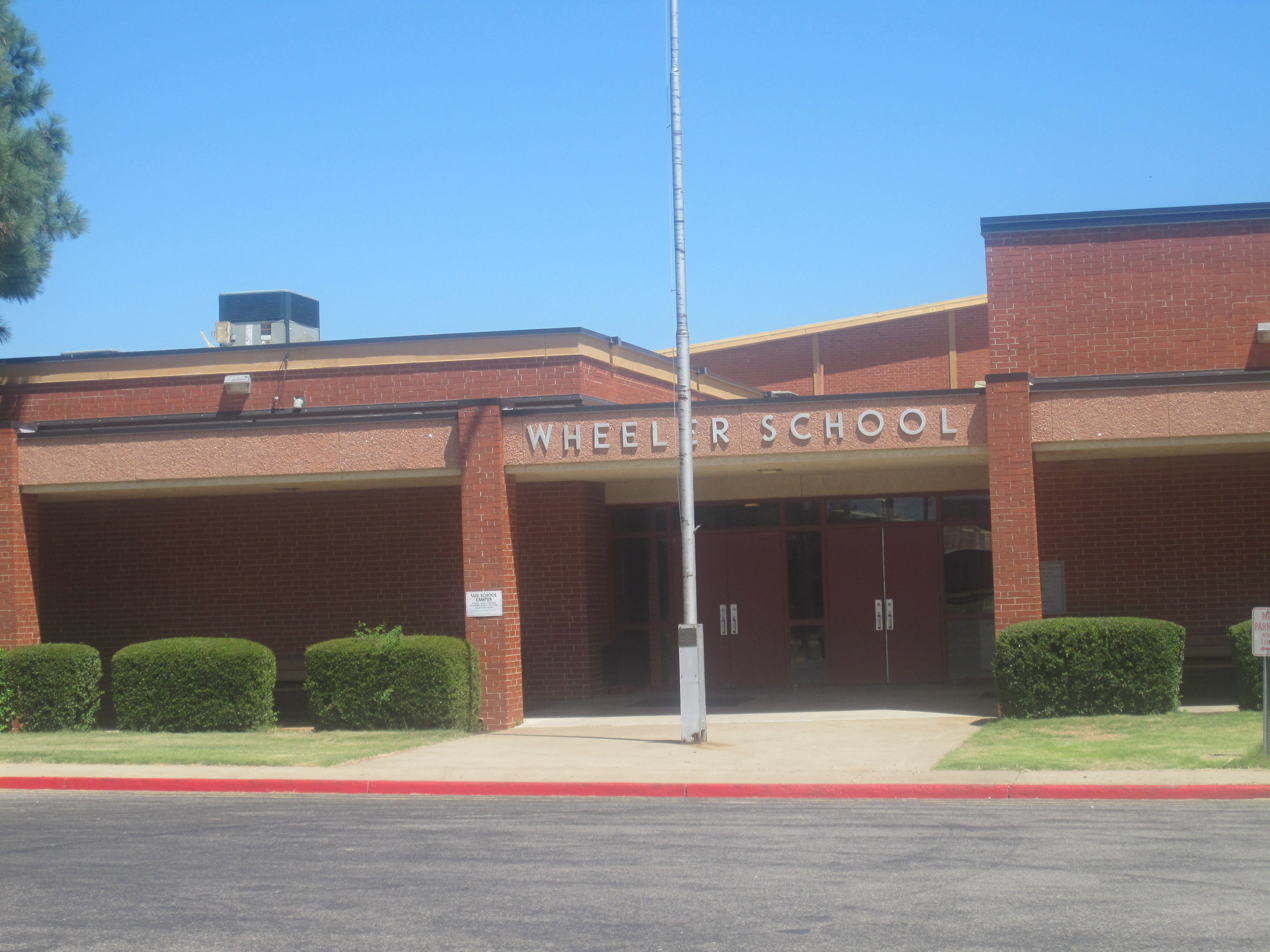
Wheeler School

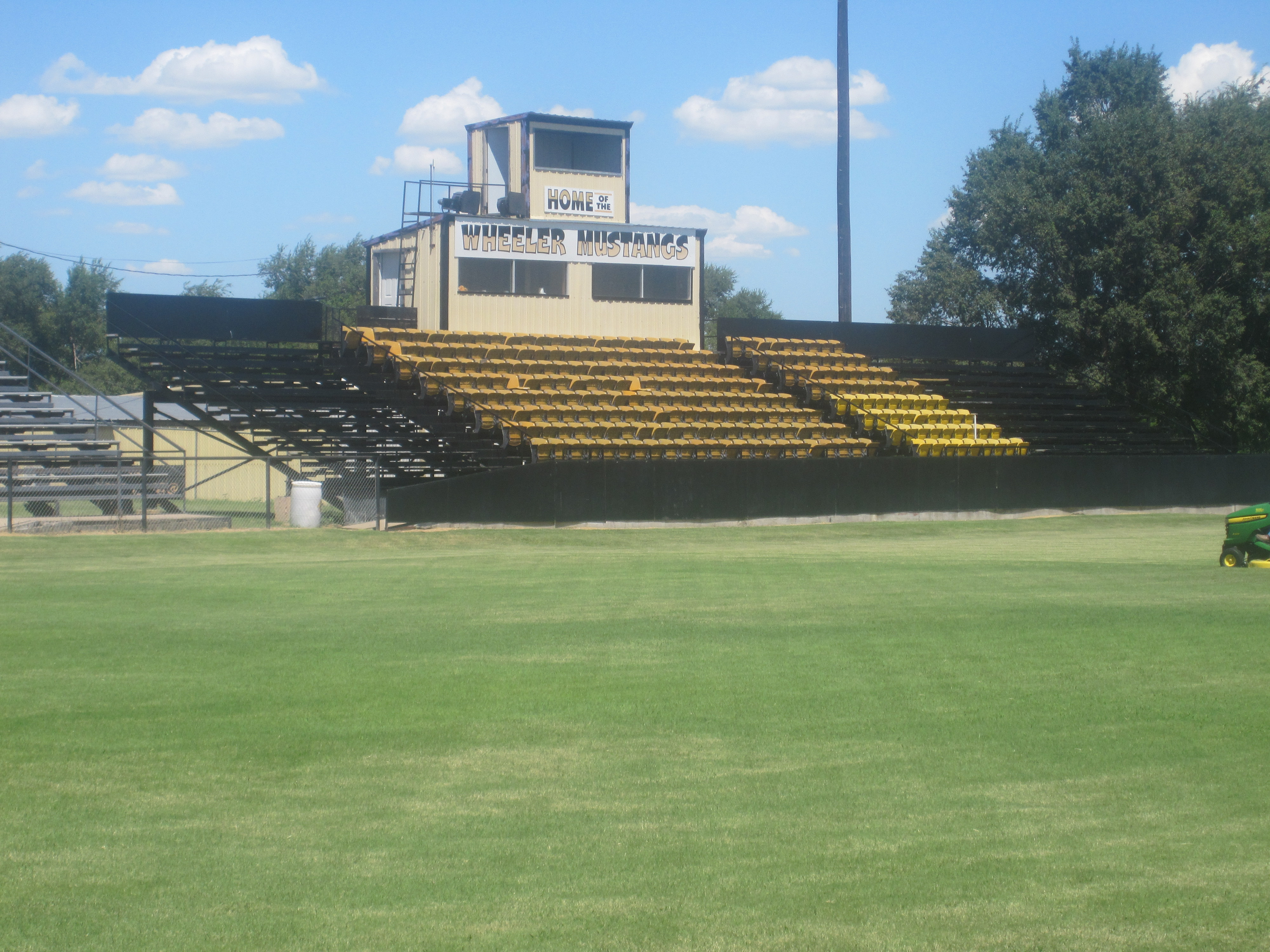
Home of the Wheeler Mustangs
