= Brashear (surname) =

Brashear is a surname. It is the anglicisation of the French surname Brasseur, meaning ″brewer″, or Brasier, Brazier, or Brassier. Notable people with the surname include:

- Allison Brashear, American neurologist
- Carl Brashear (1931–2006), the first African-American to become a US Navy diver
- Donald Brashear (born 1972), American ice hockey player
- John Brashear (1840–1920), American astronomer
- Kermit Brashear (born 1944), American Nebraska state senator and lawyer
- Kitty Brashear (1877–1934), American baseball player
- Oscar Brashear (born 1944), American jazz musician
- Roy Brashear (1874–1951), American baseball player
- Tex Brashear (born 1955), American voice actor
- Todd Brashear, bassist for the American rock band Slint

Fictional characters

- Adam Brashear, a superhero in Blue Marvel comic book series

== See also ==
- James R. Brashears (1858–1917), American lawyer, politician, and judge
- Mindy Brashears (born 1970), American administrator
