= Johner =

Johner is a surname. Notable people with the surname include:

- Brothers Ken Johner and Brad Johner, founders of the country music band The Johner Brothers
- Dustin Johner (born 1983), Canadian ice hockey player
- Gerda Johner (born 1944), Swiss pair skater
- Hans Johner, Swiss chess master
- Mélody Johner (born 1984), Swiss equestrian
- Nancy Montanez Johner, American government official
- Paul Johner, Swiss chess master
- Ron Johner, fictional character in Alien Resurrection
- Rüdi Johner (born 1942), Swiss pair skater
