= Alexis Taylor (government official) =

American government official

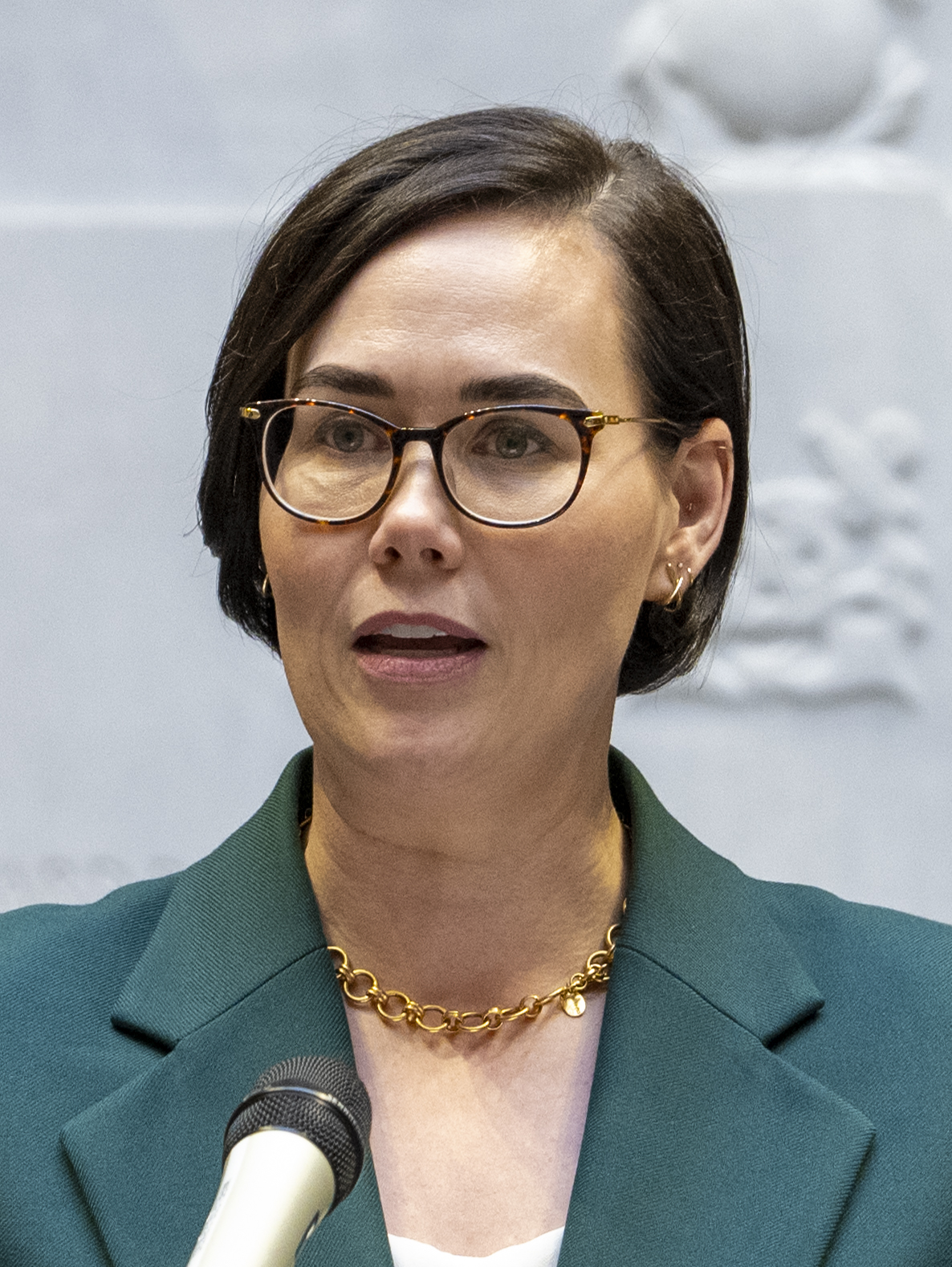

Under Secretary of Agriculture for Trade and Foreign Agricultural Affairs
- In office December 29, 2022 – January 16, 2025
- President: Joe Biden
- Preceded by: Ted McKinney
- Succeeded by: Luke J. Lindberg

Director of the Oregon Department of Agriculture
- In office January 2017 – September 30, 2022
- Governor: Kate Brown
- Preceded by: Katy Coba
- Succeeded by: Lauren Henderson (acting)

Personal details
- Education: Iowa State University (BA)

Military service
- Branch/service: United States Army
- Years of service: 1998–2006
- Unit: United States Army Reserve

Alexis Taylor is an American agricultural policy advisor who served as under secretary of agriculture for trade and foreign agricultural affairs from 2022 to 2025. She formerly served as director of the Oregon Department of Agriculture from 2017 to 2022.

== Early life and education ==
Taylor was born and raised in Iowa. She earned a Bachelor of Arts degree in political science and communication studies from Iowa State University.

== Career ==
Taylor served in the United States Army Reserve from 1998 to 2006. She was deployed to Iraq in 2003 and 2004. Taylor joined the office of Congressman Leonard Boswell as a legislative assistant. She later served as his legislative director. From 2010 to 2013, she served as a legislative assistant for Senator Max Baucus. Taylor then joined the United States Department of Agriculture, serving as chief of staff for Farm and Foreign Agricultural Services at USDA, deputy undersecretary of the Foreign Agricultural Service, and delegated the duties of the under secretary of the Farm and Foreign Agricultural Services. In January 2017, she became director of the Oregon Department of Agriculture. She resigned effective September 30, 2022.

In May 2022, President Joe Biden nominated Taylor to be the under secretary of agriculture for trade and foreign agricultural affairs. Her nomination was confirmed by the United States Senate on December 21, 2022. She was sworn in on December 29, 2022.
