= Brashear =

Brashear may refer to:

== People ==
- Brashear (surname)

== Places ==
- Brashear, Missouri, town in Missouri
- Brashear, Texas, unincorporated community in Texas
- Brashear City, former name of Morgan City, Louisiana

== Other uses ==
- Brashear High School, Pittsburgh, Pennsylvania
- Brashear (lunar crater), crater on the Moon
- Brashear (Martian crater), crater on Mars
- 5502 Brashear, asteroid

== See also ==
- Brashears (disambiguation)
