= Homer Wilkes =

American conservationist and government official

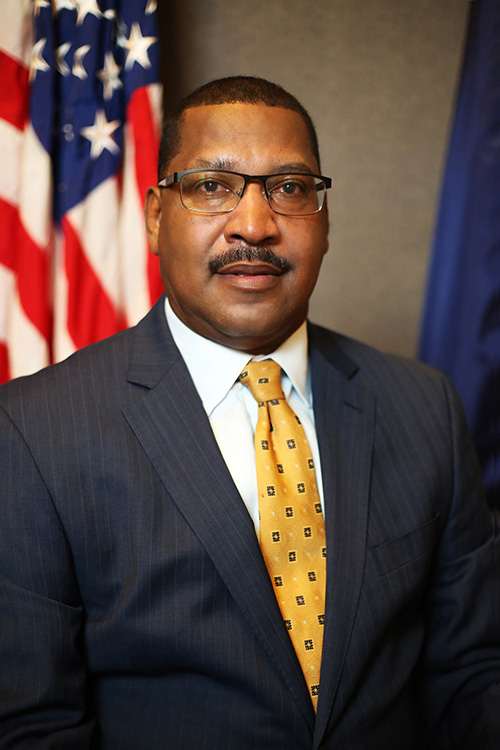
- Official portrait, 2022

Under Secretary of Agriculture for Natural Resources and Environment
- In office February 11, 2022 – January 20, 2025
- President: Joe Biden
- Preceded by: James E. Hubbard
- Succeeded by: Michael Boren

Personal details
- Born: Homer Lee Wilkes
- Spouse: Kim T. Burkhead (m. 1982)
- Children: 3
- Education: Jackson State University (BS, MBA, PhD)

Military service
- Branch/service: United States Navy
- Years of service: 1984–2007
- Unit: United States Navy Reserve

Homer Lee Wilkes is an American conservationist and government official from Mississippi. In 2021, Wilkes was nominated by President Joe Biden to serve as under secretary of agriculture for natural resources and environment. He served in this position until 2025.

== Early life and education ==
Wilkes is a native of Port Gibson, Mississippi. He earned a Bachelor of Science degree in business finance, Master of Business Administration, and PhD in urban higher education from Jackson State University.

== Career ==
From 1984 to 2007, Wilkes served as a supply officer in the United States Navy Reserve. During his career, Wilkes has served in the Natural Resources Conservation Service as acting CFO, acting associate agency chief, and Mississippi's state conservationist. From 2013 to 2022, Wilkes has worked as the director of the Gulf Coast Ecosystem Restoration Task Force.

=== Agriculture undersecretary nominations ===
==== 2009 ====
In 2009, Wilkes was nominated to serve as under secretary of agriculture for natural resources and environment. by then-President Barack Obama. Wilkes was the first African-American nominated to the position.

According to The New York Times, Wilkes' nomination was praised by environmental conservation advocacy groups due to his work in the field of wetland restoration. However, in June 2009, Wilkes withdrew from consideration, citing his desire to remain in Mississippi with his family.

==== 2021 ====
In 2021, Wilkes was once again nominated to serve as Under Secretary for Natural Resources and Environment by President Joe Biden. His nomination was confirmed by the Senate on February 8, 2022, by a voice vote.

Wilkes' nomination was praised by Secretary of Agriculture Tom Vilsack, who stated Wilkes' nomination proved the Department of Agriculture's "commitment to putting agriculture, forestry and working lands at the center of solutions to increase climate resilience, sequester carbon, protect our air and water." Senator Roger Marshall, a Republican from Kansas, stated he would vote in favor of Wilkes' nomination.
