= Sanne Group =

Jersey-domiciled financial services company

Sanne Group (acquired by Apex Group)
- Company type: Public limited company
- Traded as: LSE: SNN; FTSE 250 component
- Industry: Financial services
- Founded: 1988
- Headquarters: London
- Key people: Rupert Robson (Chairman); Martin Schnaier (CEO)
- Revenue: ▲£203.7 million (2021)
- Operating income: ▼£3.5 million (2021)
- Net income: ▼£(7.1) million (2021)
- Number of employees: 2,000 (2022)
- Parent: Apex Group
- Website: www.sannegroup.com

Sanne Group is a provider of asset management services. It was listed on the London Stock Exchange and was a constituent of the FTSE 250 Index until it was acquired by Apex Group in August 2022.

== History ==
Established in Jersey in 1988 to provide fiduciary services to private clients, Sanne started to work with corporate customers in 2003.

Inflexion Private Equity supported Sanne's acquisition of State Street's corporate administration business and took a significant stake in Sanne in return for providing the funds in January 2013.

Sanne was then the subject of an initial public offering on the London Stock Exchange in March 2015. However, it attracted some criticism because it secretly signed up shareholders before announcing the flotation. There was also some criticism that the company spent £11 million on the flotation.

The company acquired Chartered Corporate Services, a Dublin-based business, in February 2016 and, more significantly, International Financial Services, a Mauritius-based business with $82 billion of assets under management, in December 2016. Then in September 2017, it bought Luxembourg Investment Solutions and Compliance Partners on an earn-out basis. The rising volume of regulation also drove expansion.

Following these acquisitions and some subsequent organic expansion, the company's growth rate was described by Investors Chronicle in March 2018 as "explosive".

The succession planning arrangements attracted some criticism when the departure of Dean Godwin as Chief Executive was announced in January 2019 just 12 months after Spencer Daley left his post as chief financial officer; the news unsettled the market, as Godwin and Daley had led the initial public offering, and the share price fell 18% in a day. The company sold its private client business to JTC plc in March 2020.

In the wake of the COVID-19 pandemic, the company has benefited from customers focusing on the management of existing portfolios rather than new fund raising. Commentators suggested that the fact that the pandemic has so far had a minimal impact on client delivery made the company a "rare prospect of earnings resilience".

In August 2021, the Bermuda-based company, Apex Group, made an offer to acquire the company at a price per share which valued the company at £1.5 billion.

== Operations ==
The company had approximately £500 billion of assets under administration as at 31 December 2021.
