= Permira =

British global investment firm

Permira Holdings Limited

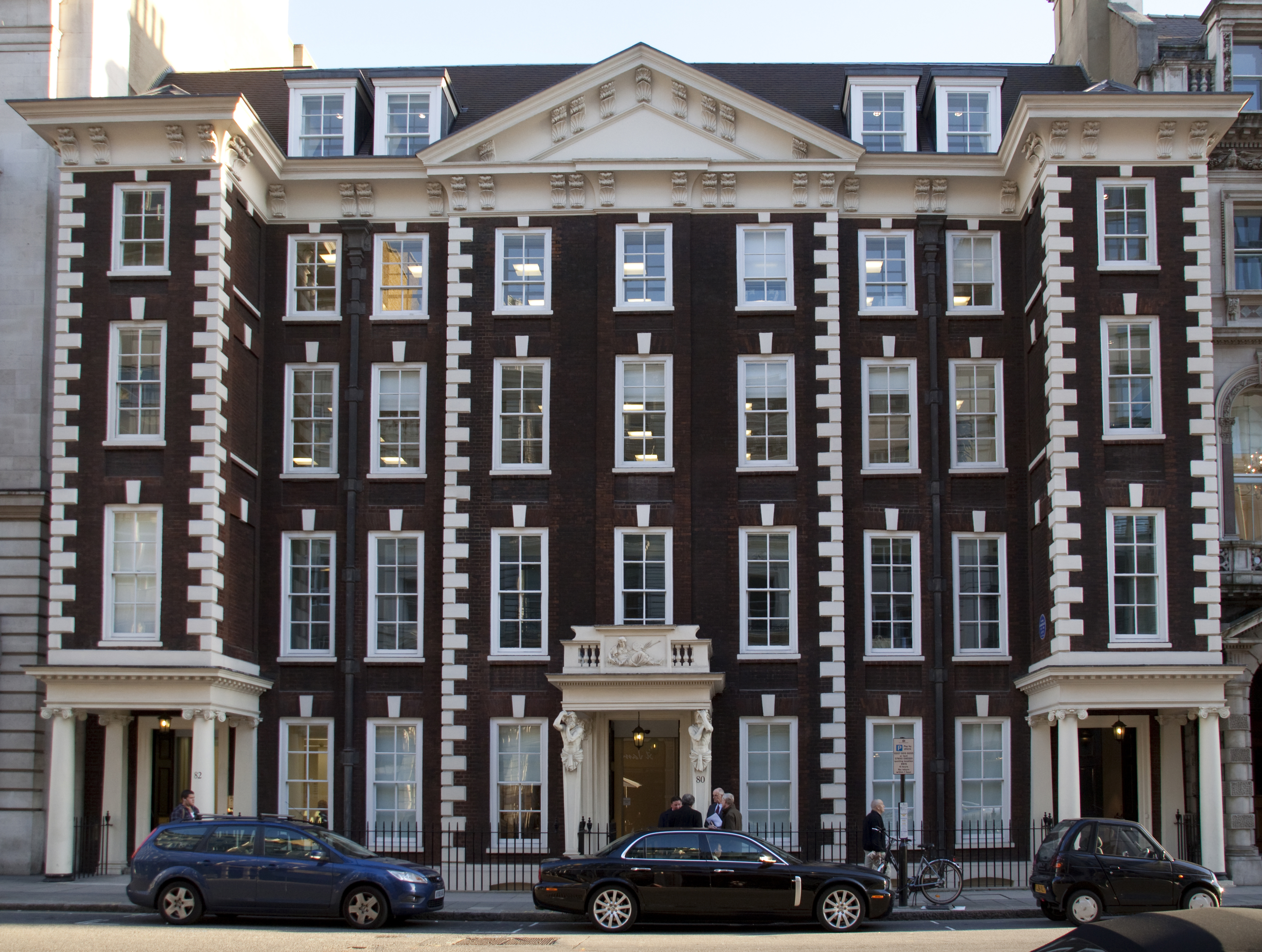
- Headquarters at Schomberg House
- Type: Private
- Industry: Private equity
- Predecessor: Schroder Ventures (Europe)
- Founded: 1985; 41 years ago
- Founders: Nicholas Ferguson and partners
- Headquarters: London, United Kingdom
- Key people: Kurt Björklund (Managing Partner)
- Products: Buyout, growth equity, credit funds
- AUM: €80 billion (2024)
- Number of employees: 470+
- Website: permira.com

Permira Holdings Limited is a British private equity firm. Founded in 1985 as part of Schroders, it became independent in 1996. Operating as Permira since 2001, the company became one of the largest buyout specialists. As of 2024, Permira advises funds with total committed capital of €80 billion, which have invested in more than 300 companies worldwide. The company employs over 470 people in 15 offices across Europe, North America and Asia.

In June 2024, Permira ranked 20th in Private Equity International's PEI 300 ranking among the world's largest private equity firms.

== History ==
In the 1980s, J. Henry Schroder Wagg, a multinational asset management company, developed a concept for private equity funds to finance management buyouts. It operated as Schroder Ventures, headquartered in the UK. Nicholas Ferguson was appointed chairman.

In 1996, Schroder Ventures staff from the UK, Germany, France, and Italy formed an independent company called Schroder Ventures Europe. It was renamed Permira in 2001 to reflect its separation from J. Henry Schroder Wagg. The Permira brand had been introduced earlier with the launch of the Permira Europe I and Permira Europe II investment funds.

During the 1990s and 2000s, Permira became the largest private equity firm in the UK and Europe. The firm invested in companies such as Cognis and Premiere. These acquisitions attracted widespread public attention. In 2002, Permira opened its first US office in New York City. The firm also established a presence in Asia with its offices in Tokyo (2005–2022) and Hong Kong (2008).

In 2004, CVC and Permira bought from Centrica the British motoring association the AA, and in July 2007 merged the AA with Saga under Acromas Holdings. In 2006, CVC and Permira were accused by Labour MP Gwyn Prosser in the House of Commons of "greed" and "blatant asset stripping" of the AA "to borrow £500m on the basis of the AA's assets in order to pay themselves a dividend." The AA responded that they were "happy to have a reasoned conversation with Mr Prosser."

In 2021, Permira successfully closed its second multi-billion growth opportunities fund at its $4bn hard cap. Most recently in 2023, the firm closed its eighth flagship buyout fund, Permira VIII, with total capital commitments of €16.7 billion.

In August 2026, Permira and the Canadian Pension Plan Investment Board acquired fund administration services company JTC Group for £2.3 billion. Located in Jersey; it was founded in 1987 as Jersey Trust Company. In 2018 it had an initial public offering on the London Stock Exchange. Its acquisitions include: Merrill Lynch's international trust and wealth structuring business,Sanne Group's private client business, and NES Financial.

== Operations ==
Permira owns businesses in several countries worldwide. Permira Holdings Limited, which has its registered office in St Peter Port, Guernsey, is the holding company for the group. Operations are managed from the headquarters in London; it also has offices in major business and financial centres, including Frankfurt.

Permira is organised as a partnership and is owned by most of its senior management. The group operates under the supervision of the executive board, which includes Kurt Björklund, who is Managing Partner.

== Investments ==
Permira advises buyouts, growth funds, equity funds, and credit funds that operate independently of the holding company. The funds are backed by, among others, institutional investors.

Permira targets companies around the world with proven growth prospects, often in partnership with management. Permira seeks to enhance the value of businesses over the medium to long term, for example through spin-offs, mergers and acquisitions, and organic growth. A common exit strategy for Permira is the sale of companies to other companies or public offerings.

Permira focuses on the technology, consumer, services, and healthcare sectors. High-profile investments include Acuity Analytics, Clearwater Analytics, Engel & Völkers, McAfee, Neuraxpharm, Reorg, Squarespace, TeamViewer, and Zendesk.
