= Richard Allen Raymond =

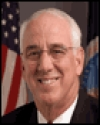
Under Secretary Richard Raymond

Richard Allen Raymond was Under Secretary of Agriculture for Food Safety from 2005 to 2009. His nomination was announced and sent to the Senate on May 26, 2005. He was confirmed on July 1 and appointed on July 18.

== Education and career ==
Before joining the U.S. Department of Agriculture, Richard Raymond was director of the Nebraska Department of Health and Human Services Regulation & Licensure division where he oversaw regulatory programs involving health care and environmental issues. He had been appointed to the position on October 16, 2004, by then-Nebraska governor Mike Johanns. He was also Nebraska's Chief Medical Officer; he had been appointed to that position in January 1999. Raymond graduated from Hastings College and earned his medical degree from the University of Nebraska Medical Center. For 17 years, he practiced medicine in rural Nebraska.

There, he established and directed a community-based Family Practice Residency for Clarkson Medical Center. He served as president of the Nebraska Medical Association, chaired Nebraska Governor Mike Johanns' Blue Ribbon Panel on Infant Mortality, and served on numerous state committees related to public health. He was also president of the Association of State and Territorial Health Officials (ASTHO) and has been a member of the association's Preparedness Committee for three years.

== Under Secretary for Food Safety ==
In November 2005, Richard Raymond was interviewed by the Washington Post, which had christened him the "germ czar," on the subject of Thanksgiving food safety. In May 2006, he appeared in television and radio advertisements seeking to ease concerns about the bird flu, saying, "It's important for you to know that it’s safe to eat poultry, even if bird flu is detected here sometime in the future." In October 2006, he criticized the idea of combining multiple agencies into a single agency responsible for food safety as an "unnecessary solution."

In December 2006, he disputed a report by Consumer Reports in which 83% of chickens they tested were infected with campylobacter and/or salmonella bacteria, noting that the sample of 500 chickens tested was "very small." In February 2007, Richard Raymond ordered stepped-up inspections at some meat and poultry plants where the threat of E. coli is high or past visits found unsafe practices. On the subject of China's banning of pork containing ractopamine, he said that he hoped Beijing could change its stance if the Codex Alimentarius Commission, an international food safety body, could endorse tolerance levels for it.

| Preceded by Merle D. Pierson (acting) | Under Secretary of Agriculture for Food Safety; 2005–2008 | Succeeded by Elizabeth Hagen |
