= Clearwater Analytics =

US-based financial technology company

Clearwater Analytics Holdings, Inc.
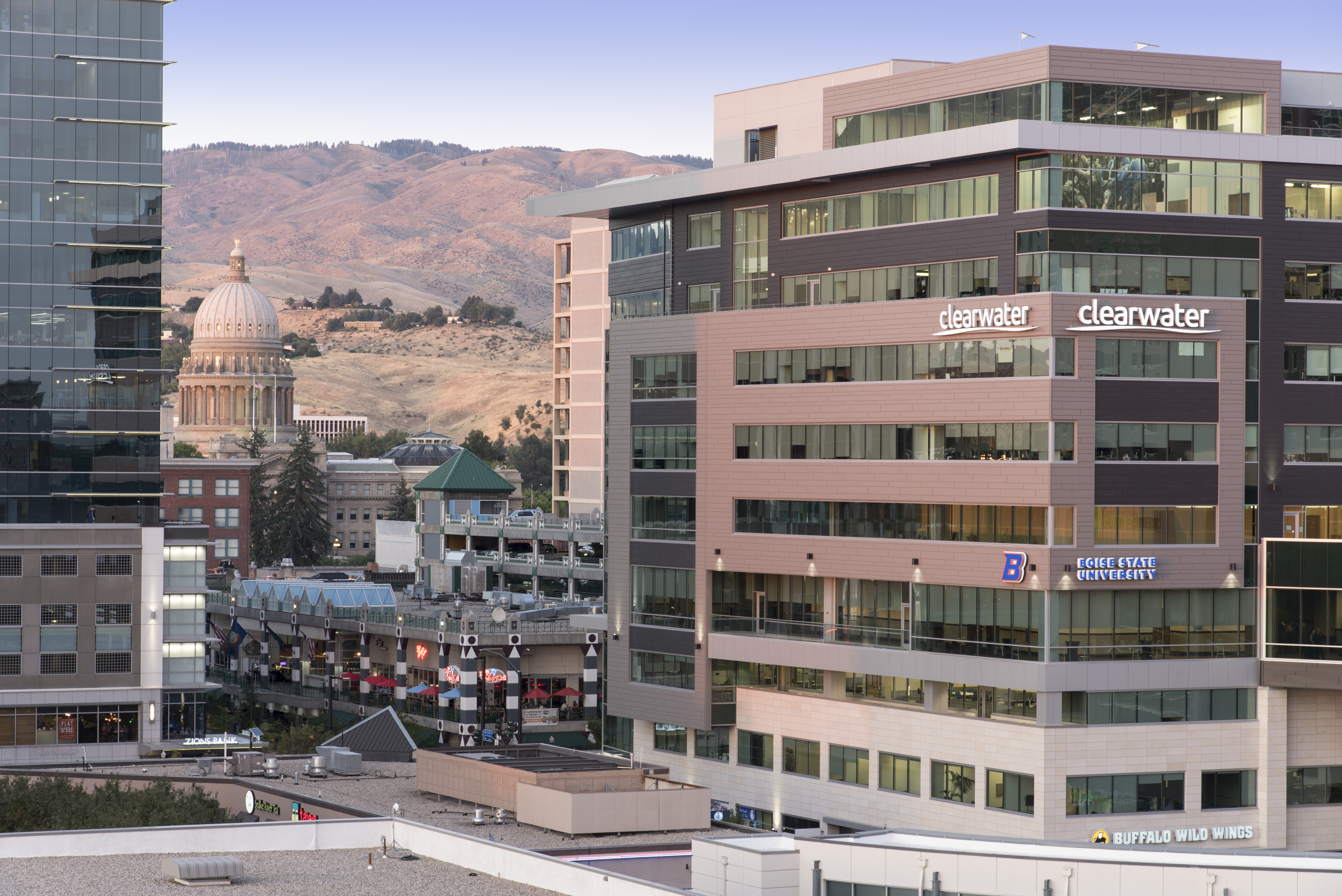
- The company's headquarters in Boise, Idaho
- Type: Public
- Traded as: NYSE: CWAN
- Industry: Financial Technology
- Founded: 2004; 22 years ago
- Headquarters: Boise, Idaho, United States
- Key people: Sandeep Sahai (CEO)
- Products: Computer Software; Support services
- Revenue: (US$30.67 billion)
- Operating income: ▲US$6.63 billion (2025)
- Net income: ▲US$4.56 billion (2025)
- Total assets: ▲US$34.99 billion (2025)
- Number of employees: 1,000–2,000 (2020)
- Website: clearwateranalytics.com

Clearwater Analytics Holdings, Inc. is an American software-as-a-service (SaaS) fintech company that provides automated investment accounting, performance, compliance, and risk reporting worldwide. Clearwater is headquartered in Boise, Idaho, with additional offices in London, Edinburgh, New York City and Noida.

== History ==
Clearwater was founded in 2004 by David Boren, Michael Boren, and Douglas Bates. Prior to founding Clearwater, David, Michael, and Douglas founded Clearwater Advisors, an institutional fixed-income investment advisor, where they developed the concept for Clearwater.

In December 2013, Clearwater Analytics announced its partnership with the Gardner Co. to help finance a new nine-story building in downtown Boise to double the company's current space to over 90,000 square feet. Construction of the Clearwater building was completed in September 2016.

The company went public via an initial public offering in September 2021, listing on the New York Stock Exchange.

In September 2022, Clearwater Analytics agreed to acquire JUMP Technology, a French firm focused on data management, front-middle-back office and reporting, for €75 million.

In April 2024, Clearwater Analytics agreed to purchase a set of risk and performance analytics solutions from Wilshire Advisors, a global financial services firm, for $40 million. The solutions encompassed fixed income analytics, equity analytics and performance measurement, accounting and compliance support analytics.

In January 2025, Clearwater Analytics agreed to acquire Enfusion, a Chicago-based investment management platform, for $1.5 billion. The deal was completed in April 2025.

In March 2025, Clearwater Analytics agreed to acquire Beacon, a provider of cross-asset class modeling and risk analytics, for approximately $560 million. In the same announcement, Clearwater Analytics shared its plans to acquire Bistro, an in-house portfolio visualization software platform built for Blackstone’s Credit & Insurance business, for $125 million.

In November 2025, private equity firm Thoma Bravo submitted an offer to take Clearwater Analytics private, following a joint offer from Permira and Warburg Pincus. The following month, Clearwater agreed to be taken private by the latter in an $8.4 billion deal. The European Commission approved the acquisition in April 2026, finding that the transaction raised no competition concerns within the European Economic Area.

== Products and services ==
Clearwater Analytics provides software-as-a-service. The Company offers automated investment accounting, performance, compliance, and risk reporting solutions. Clearwater serves customers worldwide.

== Executive team ==
The executive team at Clearwater Analytics is composed of Sandeep Sahai, CEO and board member, Cindy Blendu, Chief Transformation Officer; Jim Cox, CFO; Scott Erickson, President, Americas and New Markets; and Souvik Das, Chief Technology Officer.

== Awards ==
- 2012 – Innovative Company of the Year, Idaho Innovation Awards
- 2013 – Technology Firm of the Year, Captive Review
- 2014 – Idaho Private 75
- 2019 – Best Software Solution, UK & European Captive Review Awards
- 2019 – Technology Firm of the Year, Insurance Asset Management Awards
