= Luke J. Lindberg =

American businessman and diplomat

Luke Lindberg
- WFP portrait, 2026

Executive Director of the World Food Programme
- Incumbent
- Assumed office October 26, 2026
- Secretary General: António Guterres
- Preceded by: Carl Skau (acting)

Under Secretary of Agriculture for Trade and Foreign Agricultural Affairs
- In office August 4, 2025 – September 18, 2026
- President: Donald Trump
- Preceded by: Alexis Taylor
- Succeeded by: Vacant

Personal details
- Born: 1988 or 1989 (age 37–38) Norwich, Vermont, U.S.
- Party: Republican
- Spouse: Brittany Thune Lindberg
- Children: 2
- Relatives: John Thune (father-in-law)
- Education: University of Maryland, College Park (BA, MPP, MBA)

Luke J. Lindberg (born 1988/1989) is an American businessman and diplomat who, since October 2026, has served as executive director of the World Food Programme. He previously served as under secretary of agriculture for trade and foreign agricultural affairs in the United States Department of Agriculture (USDA).

== Early life and education ==
Lindberg was raised in Norwich, Vermont, where his mother, Cheryl A. Lindberg, has served as town treasurer since 1996. He graduated from Hanover High School in New Hampshire and earned a B.A. in Government & Politics, an MBA and a Master of Public Policy from the University of Maryland.

== Early career ==
Lindberg began his career advising public and private sector clients on strategy, operations, and organizational performance in government and regulated environments with IBM in Washington, D.C.

Between 2021 and 2022, Lindberg served at Sanford World Clinic, leading global health operations across seven countries, overseeing multidisciplinary teams and international partnerships, including a team of nearly 300 personnel across approximately 30 clinics in Ghana.

In July 2019, Lindberg joined the Export–Import Bank of the United States (EXIM) as a senior executive, overseeing a $50 billion portfolio. During his tenure, he helped implement the "China and Transformational Exports Program," after the EXIM board adopted a new content policy in December 2020.

== Under Secretary of Agriculture ==
Donald Trump announced Lindberg's selection on January 16, 2025, via Truth Social. The formal nomination was sent to the Senate (PN 12-26) on January 20, 2025.

He was confirmed by the United States Senate on August 2, 2025, by a vote of 78–17.

One month into his tenure, Lindberg and Secretary Brooke Rollins announced a three-point plan to "support U.S. Agricultural Farmers, Ranchers, Producers, and Exporters".

== Executive Director of the World Food Programme ==
In April 2026, he was nominated as the United States's candidate for the executive director of the World Food Programme. He assumed the office in October 2026.

== Personal life ==
Lindberg lives in South Dakota with his wife, Brittany Thune Lindberg, and their two children. Lindberg is the son-in-law of U.S. senator John Thune.

Political offices
Preceded by Alexis Taylor	Under Secretary of Agriculture for Trade and Foreign Agricultural Affairs; 2025–2026	Succeeded by TBD
Diplomatic posts
Preceded by Carl Skau; Acting	Executive Director of the World Food Programme; 2026–present	Incumbent
