= Engel & Völkers =

International real estate and service company

Engel & Völkers Holding GmbH
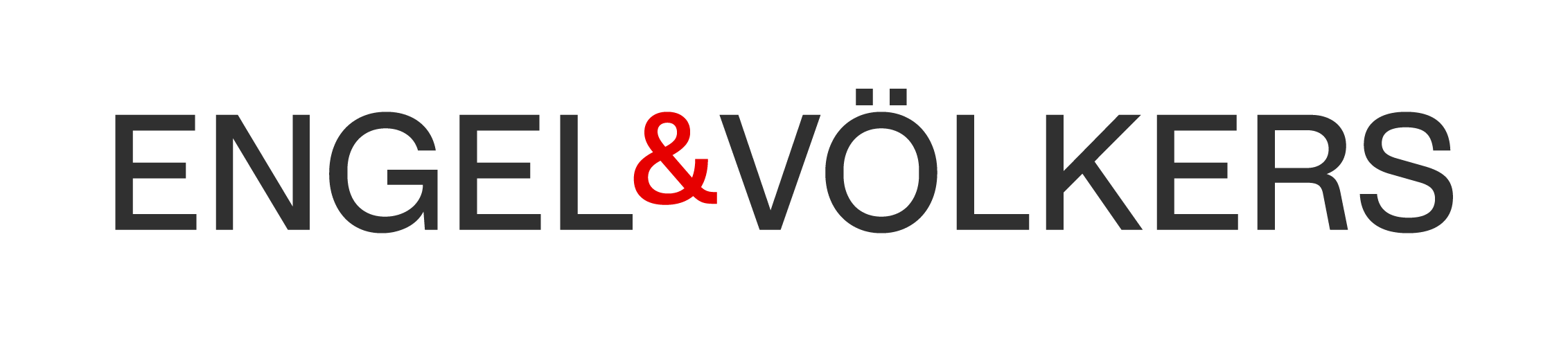

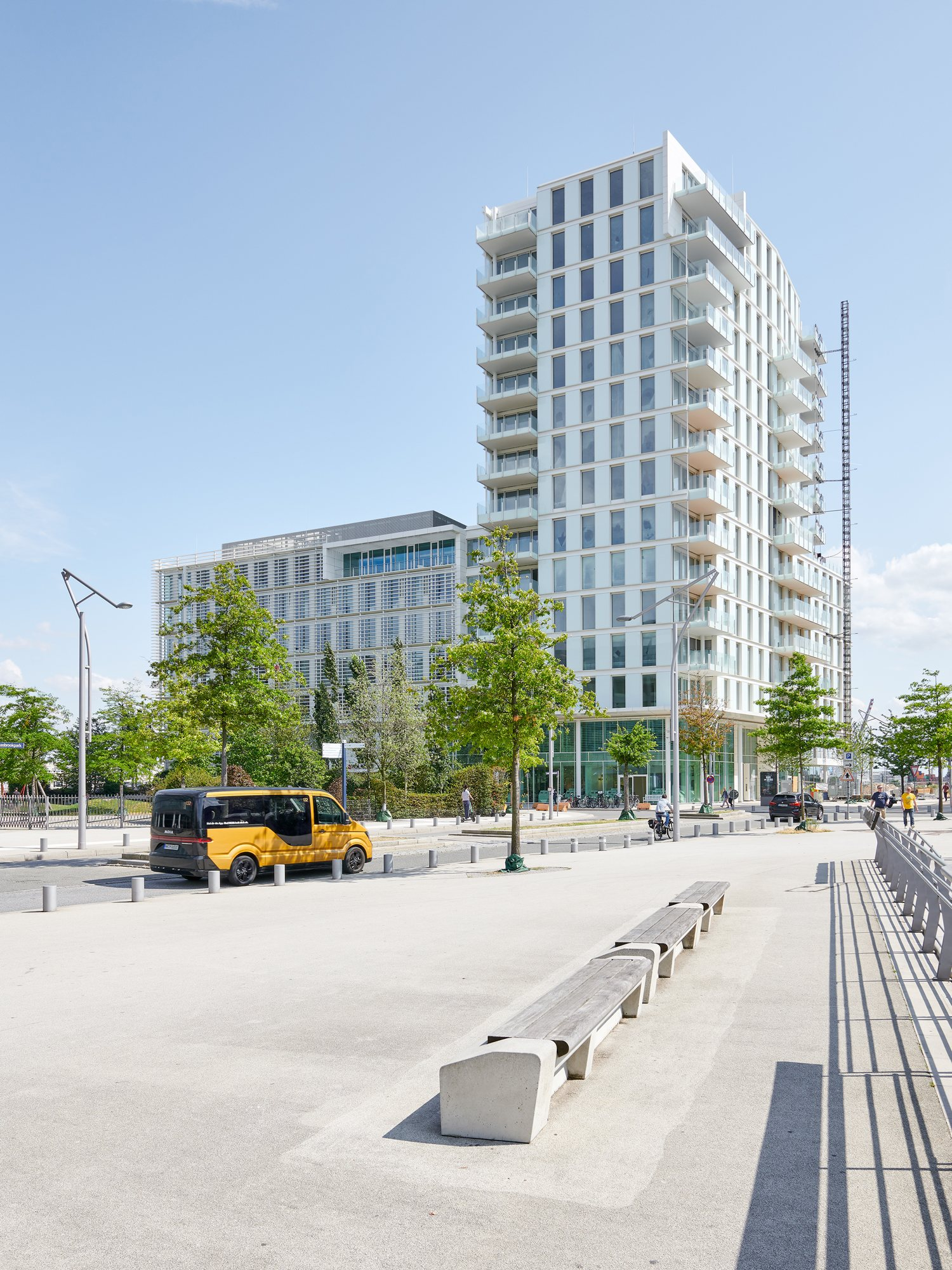
- Headquarters in HafenCity, Hamburg
- Formerly: Engel & Cie.
- Type: Private (GmbH)
- Industry: Real estate
- Founded: December 1977
- Founders: Dirk Engel
- Headquarters: Hamburg, Germany
- Number of locations: 1,000 in 35 countries (2025)
- Area served: Europe; Middle East; North America; Latin America
- Key people: Till-Fabian Zalweski (Co-Chief Executive Officer and Co-Chairman of the Management Board), Stefan Eck (Co-Chief Executive Officer and Co-Chairman of the Management Board); Christian Völkers (Chairman of the Supervisory Board)
- Revenue: €1.24 billion (2024)
- Owner: 60% Permira managed private equity funds; 40% Christian Völkers and other individuals
- Number of employees: 16,700 (2024)
- Website: engelvoelkers.com

Engel & Völkers is a German international real estate and service company headquartered in Hamburg, Germany. The company was founded in 1977 as Engel & Cie. by Dirk Engel and is specialized in brokering high-end residential and commercial properties.

In the 1990s, under the leadership of Christian Völkers, the company began to expand internationally and introduced a franchise model. Permira funds acquired the majority of shares in 2021.

Engel & Völkers is present in more than 35 countries with over 1,000 locations operated through its own offices and those of license partners. The company operates across five continents, with a strong concentration of activities in European markets and an expanding presence in North America. In total, more than 16,700 people work under the Engel & Völkers brand.

== History ==
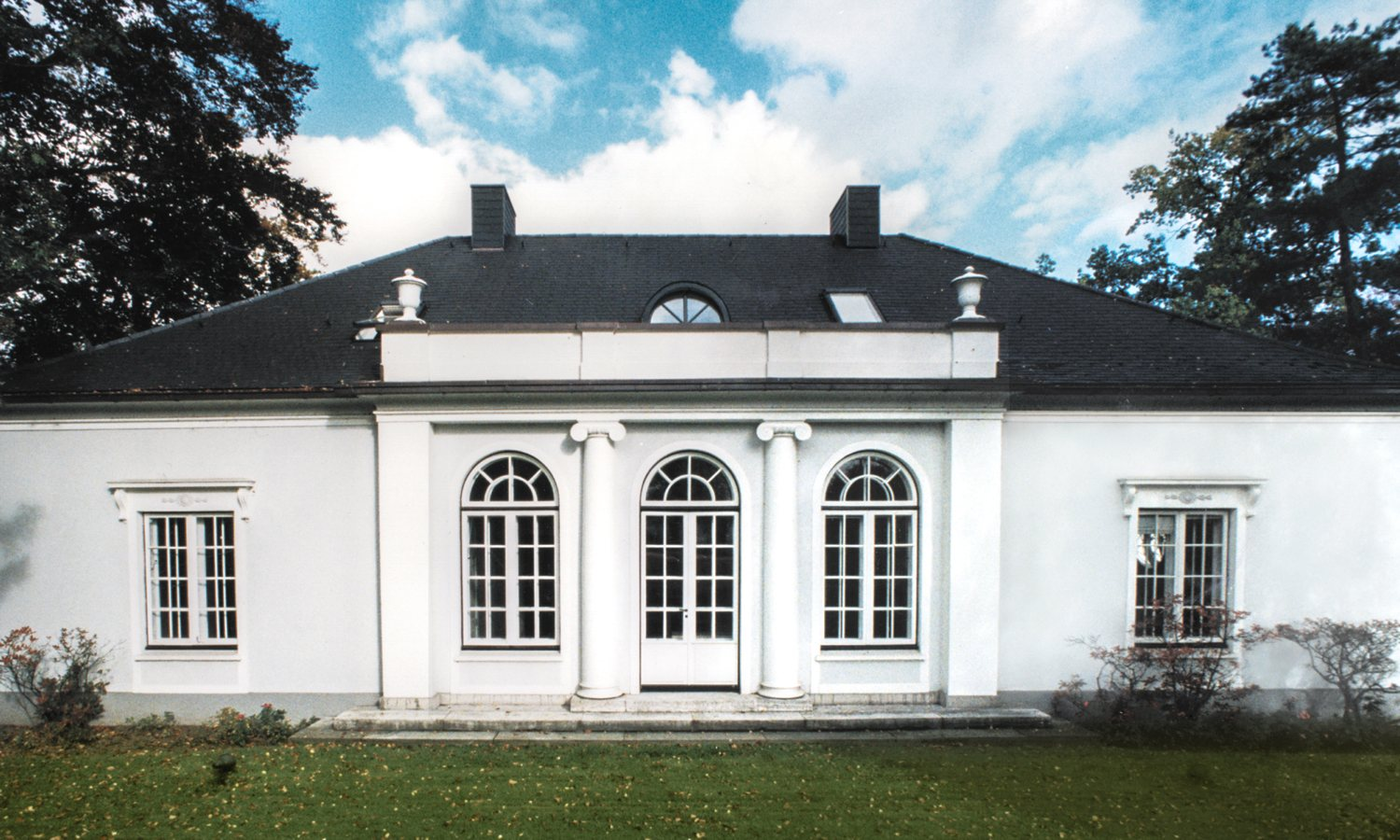
Villa on the Elbchaussee in Hamburg

=== Foundation of Engel & Cie. ===
In 1977, Dirk Engel established his own real estate agency in Hamburg. In 1980, Engel opened an office in a villa on Elbchaussee. The villa was part of the logo for many years and is still anchored in the brand identity.

In 1981, Christian Völkers joined the company as a managing partner. Dirk Engel and Christian Völkers had been friends since their youth. After Engel died in 1986, Völkers took over his partner's shares and continued to run Engel & Cie. under the name Engel & Völkers. He also expanded the business from residential to commercial real estate.

=== International expansion ===
In 1990, Engel & Völkers opened its first office outside Germany in Palma de Mallorca. Further offices were established in Spain (1999), Switzerland, and Austria (2001), and other countries followed.

The company worked with selected license partners to enter the market. This led to the development of the franchise model, which was introduced in 1998 for independent brokers who want to operate under the Engel & Völkers brand. In advance of this, the typical Engel & Völkers shop concept was developed, the corporate identity was standardized, and investments were made in training and further education. One example is the establishment of the in-house Engel & Völkers academy in 1995.

Over the following years, Engel & Völkers focused on further internationalization. In 2005, the company entered the US market and opened an office in New York City in 2014. In 2006, Engel & Völkers opened its first office in South Africa.

At the end of the 2000s, the company expanded its range of services in the luxury segment. One example of this is its entry into the brokerage of yachts, with private jets being added at times later on. Engel & Völkers also initiated a polo school and organized polo tournaments. To meet the demands of high-net-worth individuals and business clients, the company developed the Engel & Völkers private office division.

In 2008, the company founded Engel & Völkers charity as a non-profit organization, aiming to provide children in West Africa with access to education.

In 2014, real estate financing was added as a further business area and is now a division of the Engel & Völkers group.

=== Recent developments ===
In 2018, Engel & Völkers moved into a new headquarters in Hamburg's HafenCity. Several bee colonies were placed on the building's roof. The company estimates that there are around 100,000 honeybees.

During the global COVID-19 pandemic, demand for high-end real estate continued, with an increase in virtual property viewings.

In mid-2020, Christian Völkers gradually withdrew from the company's management and moved from the management board to the supervisory board. In 2021, the private equity firm Permira announced it would take a majority stake in Engel & Völkers. The transaction aimed to strengthen Engel & Völkers' market position, particularly by investing in digitalization.

== Operations ==
=== Group structure ===
The group's holding company is Engel & Völkers Holding GmbH, based in Hamburg. The company's business activities include investments of all kinds. The operative business is handled by subsidiaries such as Engel & Völkers GmbH in Germany and Engel & Völkers Americas Inc.

Engel & Völkers's majority shareholders are private equity funds of Permira. The shareholding is held through various intermediate companies.

Christian Völkers played a significant role in shaping the company for many years. In August 2020, he resigned as chief executive officer and chair of the management board. Sven Odia, who had been a member of the management board since 2014, succeeded him.

From November 2023 to July 2026, the company has been managed by Jawed Barna. Since July 2026, Till-Fabian Zalewski and Stefan Eck are co-chief executive officers of the entire Engel & Völkers group and co-chairmen of the management board. Other members of the management board are Ricardo Arends, Rainer Klipp.

=== Business activities ===
Engel & Völkers' core business is the brokerage of high-quality residential and commercial real estate. To this end, the Engel & Völkers distribution system and the right to use the trademark are licensed to independent brokers who manage their business autonomously. Engel & Völkers uses a proprietary digital platform for all processes in accounting, marketing, and other areas.

Engel & Völkers' core markets include North America, Canada, Germany, Austria, and Switzerland. Spain, Portugal, and Andorra join these; other core markets are Italy, France, Greece, and the Middle East. South America is also considered a growth region.

In metropolitan areas, major cities, popular tourist destinations, and key economic and financial centers Engel & Völkers also operates offices, known as Market Centers. These are more prominent locations, with up to three hundred real estate agents working there.

In addition to the classic franchise business, Engel & Völkers has granted individual entrepreneurially independent license partners rights to use the brand for further business areas in real estate-related sectors. These include the development of hotel properties ("hotel consulting") and advice on all asset classes in the real estate sector ("investment consulting").

== Publications ==
The Grund Genug Verlag publishing house was founded in 1988 and is now a subsidiary of Engel & Völkers. It publishes four times a year the GG (Grund Genug) magazine, which reports editorially on lifestyle topics such as architecture, design, fashion, and travel while showcasing a selection of exclusive properties from the Engel & Völkers portfolio worldwide.
