= Wheeler Independent School District =

School district in Texas

Address
- 1 Mustang Dr Wheeler, Texas, 79096; United States

District information
- Grades: Pre-school - 12
- Superintendent: Paul Markham
- Enrollment: 397

Other information
- Telephone: (806) 826-5241
- Fax: (806) 826-3118
- Website: Wheeler Independent School District

The Wheeler Independent School District is a public school district in Wheeler County, Texas, United States, based in Wheeler, Texas. The district extends into a small portion of Gray County.

In 2009, the school district was rated "academically acceptable" by the Texas Education Agency.

== Schools ==
The Wheeler Independent School District has one elementary school, one middle school, and one high school.

=== Elementary schools ===
- Thomas R. Helton Elementary

=== Middle schools ===
- Wheeler Junior High School

=== High schools ===
- Wheeler High School (Texas)

== Controversy ==
In July 2024, the ACLU of Texas sent Wheeler Independent School District a letter, alleging that the district's 2023-2024 dress and grooming code appeared to violate the Texas CROWN Act, a state law which prohibits racial discrimination based on hair texture or styles, and asking the district to revise its policies for the 2024–2025 school year.
