= NES Financial =

American financial services company

JTC Americas
- Formerly: Nationwide Exchange Services Corporation NES Financial
- Type: Private
- Industry: Financial Services
- Founded: 2005
- Headquarters: San Jose, California, United States of America
- Area served: Worldwide
- Services: 1031 exchanges EB-5 Escrow Fund administration
- Owner: JTC plc

NES Financial is a privately held company that provides services for financial transactions. The company focuses its services on 1031 exchanges, EB-5, and escrow, and fund administration. NES Financial is based in San Jose, California and maintains a regional office in Boston.

== History ==
The company was originally named Nationwide Exchange Services Corporation: it was founded in Silicon Valley in 2005.

In 2011 and again in 2012, Inc. Magazine's 500|5000 recognized NES Financial as one of the fastest-growing private companies in America with its three-year growth hitting 179%.

It was bought by JTC plc for $40 million in April 2020.

The company rebranded to JTC Americas in April 2021.

== Acquisitions ==
In October 2006, NES Financial acquired Cole Taylor Tax Deferred Exchange, a division of Cole Taylor Bank.

In November 2008, JP Morgan Property Exchange (JPEX) from JP Morgan Chase.

== Financial reform efforts ==
After the 2008 financial crisis, NES Financial focused its efforts in Washington D.C. Led by CEO Michael Halloran, the company lobbied tirelessly to improved 1031 industry regulations. Despite Halloran's nearly two years worth of efforts, the Dodd–Frank Wall Street Reform and Consumer Protection Act of 2010 did not include additional 1031 regulations.
