= Ted McKinney =

American government official

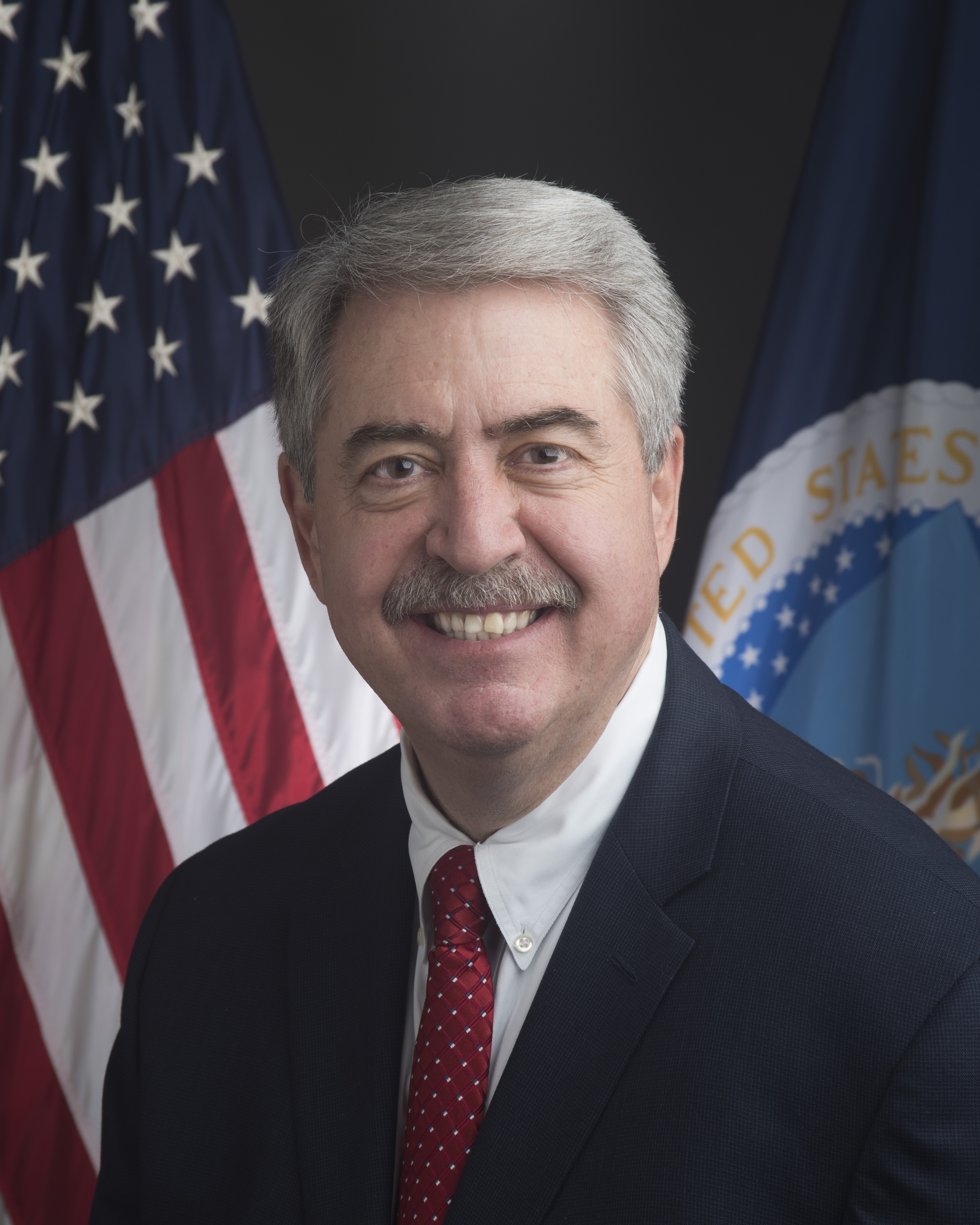

Under Secretary of Agriculture for Trade and Foreign Agricultural Affairs
- In office October 10, 2017 – January 20, 2021
- President: Donald Trump
- Preceded by: Position established
- Succeeded by: Alexis Taylor

Director of the Indiana Department of Agriculture
- In office January 7, 2014 – October 5, 2017
- Governor: Mike Pence; Eric Holcomb
- Preceded by: Gina Sheets
- Succeeded by: Melissa Rekeweg

Personal details
- Born: Tipton, Indiana, U.S.
- Spouse: Julie
- Children: 3
- Education: Purdue University (BA)

Ted McKinney is an American government official who served as under secretary of agriculture for trade and foreign agricultural affairs. Prior to assuming this position, McKinney served as director of the Indiana State Department of Agriculture from 2014 to 2017. In September 2021, Ted McKinney was named chief executive officer of the National Association of State Departments of Agriculture.

== Early life and education ==
McKinney grew up on a family farm in Tipton, Indiana. He was active in 4-H and the National FFA Organization. In 1981, he received a B.A. in agricultural economics from Purdue University. At Purdue, McKinney received the G.A. Ross Award as the outstanding senior male graduate. In 2002, he was named a Purdue Agriculture Distinguished Alumnus, and in 2004, he received an honorary American FFA Degree.

== Career ==
McKinney worked for 19 years with Dow AgroSciences, and 14 years with Elanco, a subsidiary of Eli Lilly and Company, where he was Director of Global Corporate Affairs. He has served on the National FFA Conventions Local Organizing Committee, Indiana State Fair Commission, International Food Information Council, the U.S. Meat Export Federation, International Federation of Animal Health, and the Purdue Dean of Agriculture Advisory Committee.

On May 18, 2019, McKinney was awarded an Honorary Doctorate of Agriculture by Huntington University in Huntington, Indiana. McKinney also served as the 2019 Commencement speaker for Huntington University.

=== U.S. Department of Agriculture ===
In July 2017, President Donald Trump nominated McKinney to be the under secretary of agriculture for trade and foreign agricultural affairs. At the time of his nomination, McKinney had been serving as director of the Indiana State Department of Agriculture. He was confirmed unanimously by the United States Senate on October 3, 2017. McKinney was the inaugural holder of the post of Under Secretary of Agriculture for Trade and Foreign Agricultural Affairs since the position was created by Congress in 2014.

At his confirmation hearing, McKinney said he anticipated "investing significant time in many foreign countries...building trust, opening doors for farmers and processors, removing trade barriers, and otherwise being what I hope to be known as: a high-trust and high-delivery person of our ag portfolio." Secretary Sonny Perdue said McKinney would "wake up every morning seeking to sell more American agricultural products in foreign markets."

In November 2017, McKinney traveled to India on his first international trade mission. The 50-person trade delegation, which sought to advance the trade policy relationship between the U.S. and India, held over 465 business to business meetings.

In September 2019, during a speech to the National Farmers Union, when talking about Trump's trade war with China, McKinney called General Secretary of the Chinese Communist Party Xi Jinping a "communist zealot" and "very much in the spirit of Mao Zedong". McKinney also criticized Chinese government's crackdown on church attendance, quoting the report by the diplomatic representatives of the Department's Foreign Agricultural Service in China.
