= Michael Boren =

American businessman

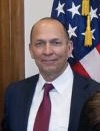

Under Secretary of Agriculture for Natural Resources and Environment
- Incumbent
- Assumed office January 20, 2026
- President: Donald Trump
- Preceded by: Homer Wilkes

Personal details
- Education: Brigham Young University (BA)

Michael Boren is an American businessman and government official serving as Under Secretary of Agriculture for Natural Resources and Environment. He is the cofounder of Clearwater Analytics.

In 2025, Donald Trump nominated Boren for Under Secretary of Agriculture for Natural Resources and Environment. The billionaire rancher has clashed with the Forest Service over various issues, including a cabin, stream diversion, and an unpermitted airstrip built on protected land at his 480-acre Hell Roaring Ranch, adjacent to and within the Sawtooth National Recreation Area in Idaho. In July 2026, Boren pressured Forest Service officials to send additional aircraft to respond to a fire located 15 miles from his ranch, diverting resources away from efforts to contain larger wildfires elsewhere in the state.

He holds a B.A. in economics from Brigham Young University, and is a member of The Church of Jesus Christ of Latter-Day Saints.
