= Oregon Department of Agriculture =

Governmental agency

- Seal of the Oregon Department of Agriculture

Agency overview
- Headquarters: 635 Capitol St. NE; Salem, Oregon
- Employees: 604
- Annual budget: $128.4 million
- Agency executive: Lisa Charpilloz Hanson, director
- Website: Oregon Department of Agriculture

The Oregon Department of Agriculture (ODA) is responsible for agriculture in Oregon. This agency of the government of the U.S. state of Oregon promotes and regulates food production and safety. It is headed by the director of agriculture, appointed by the governor of Oregon, subject to confirmation by the senate, advised by a board of ten members, and gubernatorial appointees. Through its nine divisions, it administers no fewer than 36 chapters of Oregon laws.

Established as the State Department of Agriculture (SDA) in 1931 by an act of the Oregon Legislative Assembly which consolidated a patchwork of state programs and bureaus.

Its legislatively adopted budget for the 2019–2021 biennium was $128.4 million.

== Organization ==
The department is under the direction and supervision of a director of agriculture, who is appointed by the governor of Oregon. The director is assisted in managing the department by a deputy director and two assistant directors.

=== State Board of Agriculture ===
The Oregon State Board of Agriculture advises the director and the department regarding the implementation, administration and enforcement of department programs and the development of department policies designed improve the agricultural industry in the State. The State Board of Agriculture is composed of ten members. The Governor of Oregon appoints nine of the board members and the chair of Oregon Soil and Water Conservation Commission serves as the tenth member. The director of the director and the dean of the College of Agriculture at Oregon State University, serve as ex-officio members.

=== Internal structure ===
- State Board of Agriculture
- Director of Agriculture
  - Deputy Director
    - Administration Area
      - Office of the Director
      - Information Office
      - Administrative Services
      - Farm Mediation and Price Negotiation
    - Food Safety Area
      - Animal Health and Identification Division
      - Food Safety Division
      - Laboratory Services Division
      - Measurement Standards Division
    - Natural Resources Area
      - Natural Resources Division
      - Pesticides Division
      - Plant Division
    - Agricultural Development Area
      - Agricultural Development and Marketing Division
      - Commodity Inspection Division
