= Gary Washington =

United States government official

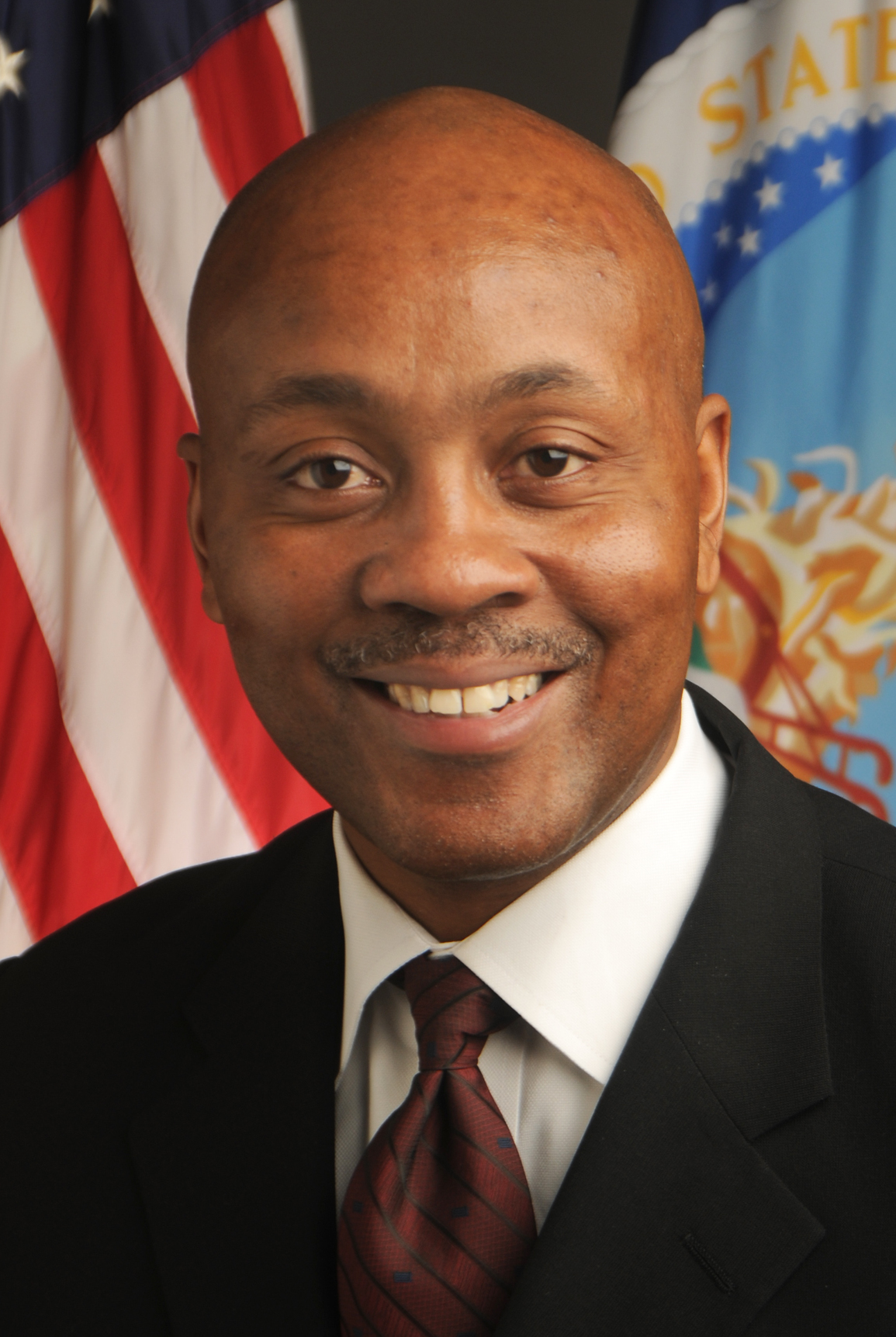
- Official portrait, 2025

Acting United States Secretary of Agriculture
- In office January 20, 2025 – February 13, 2025
- President: Donald Trump
- Preceded by: Tom Vilsack
- Succeeded by: Brooke Rollins

Personal details
- Education: Strayer University (BS)

Gary Washington is an American government official serving as the chief innovation officer of the United States Department of Agriculture. He served as the acting United States secretary of agriculture from January 20, 2025 to February 13, 2025.

Political offices
Preceded by Tom Vilsack	United States Secretary of Agriculture; Acting; 2025	Succeeded by Brooke Rollins
