= Stacy Dean =

American government official

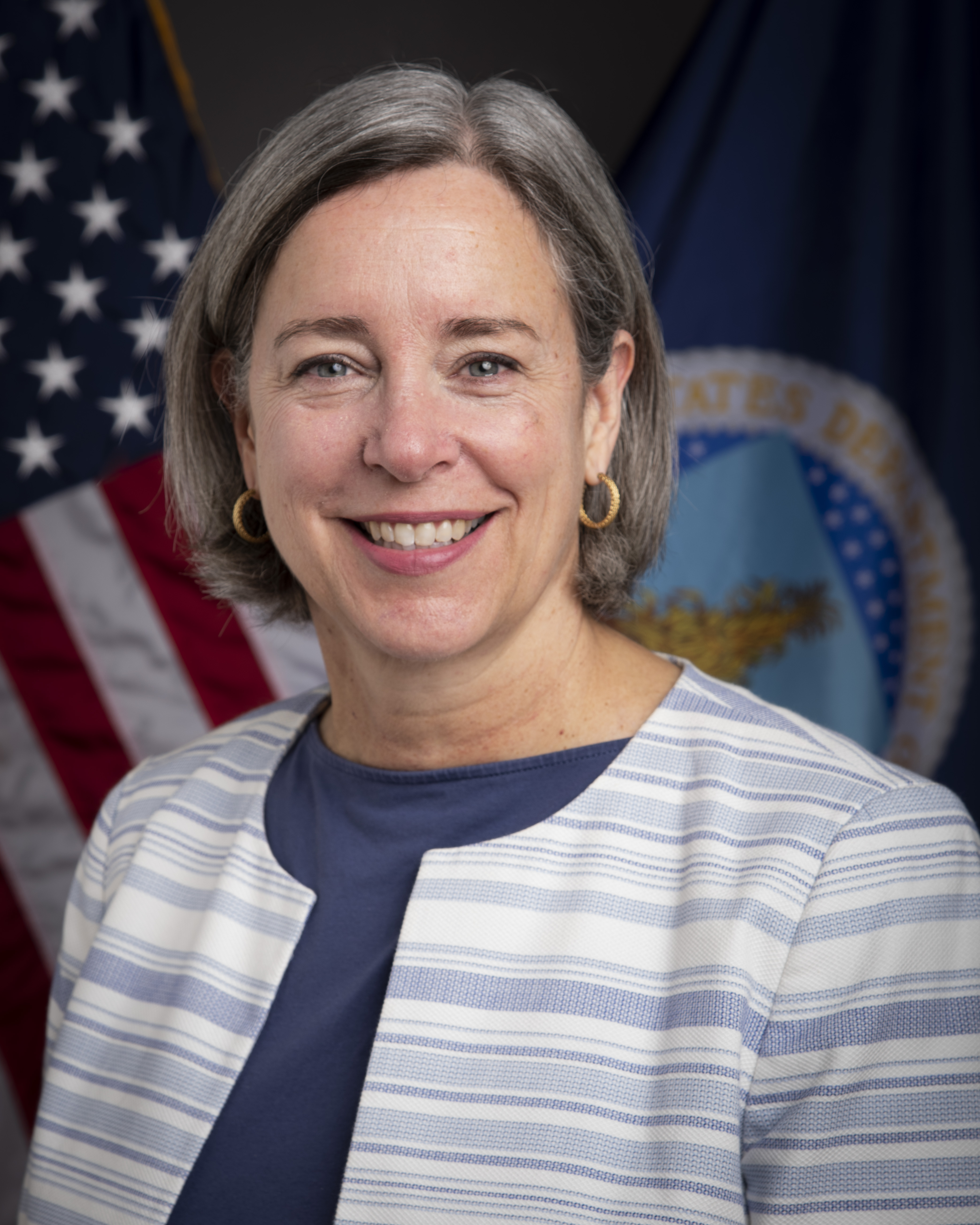

Deputy Under Secretary of Agriculture for Food, Nutrition, and Consumer Services
- Incumbent
- Assumed office January 21, 2021
- President: Joe Biden

Personal details
- Education: University of Michigan (BA, MPP)

Stacy Dean is an American policy advisor who is serving as deputy under secretary of agriculture for food, nutrition, and consumer services.

== Education ==
Dean earned a Bachelor of Arts and Master of Public Policy from the University of Michigan.

== Career ==
From 1992 to 1997, Dean served as a budget analyst in the Office of Management and Budget. She joined the Center on Budget and Policy Priorities in 1997, working as a senior policy analyst until 2000 and vice president for food assistance policy until 2021.

On January 21, 2021, Dean began service in the Biden administration as deputy under secretary for food, nutrition, and consumer services at the Department of Agriculture (USDA). During her tenure at USDA, Dean oversaw the 2021 update to the Thrifty Food Plan (TFP). The nonpartisan U.S. Government Accountability Office later determined this action violated the Congressional Review Act. The nonpartisan Congressional Budget Office found that the 2021 TFP "reduced the fraction of people participating in the labor force as a response to the higher transfer income that people received when not working." On May 13, 2022, President Biden nominated her to the under secretary position in the same office. Her nomination was resubmitted in January 2023 but expired a year later and was not resubmitted.
