= Nancy Montanez Johner =

American government official

Under Secretary of Agriculture for Food, Nutrition, and Consumer Services
- In office 2006–2009
- President: George W. Bush
- Preceded by: Eric M. Bost
- Succeeded by: Kevin Concannon

Personal details
- Education: University of Nebraska at Kearney (BS)

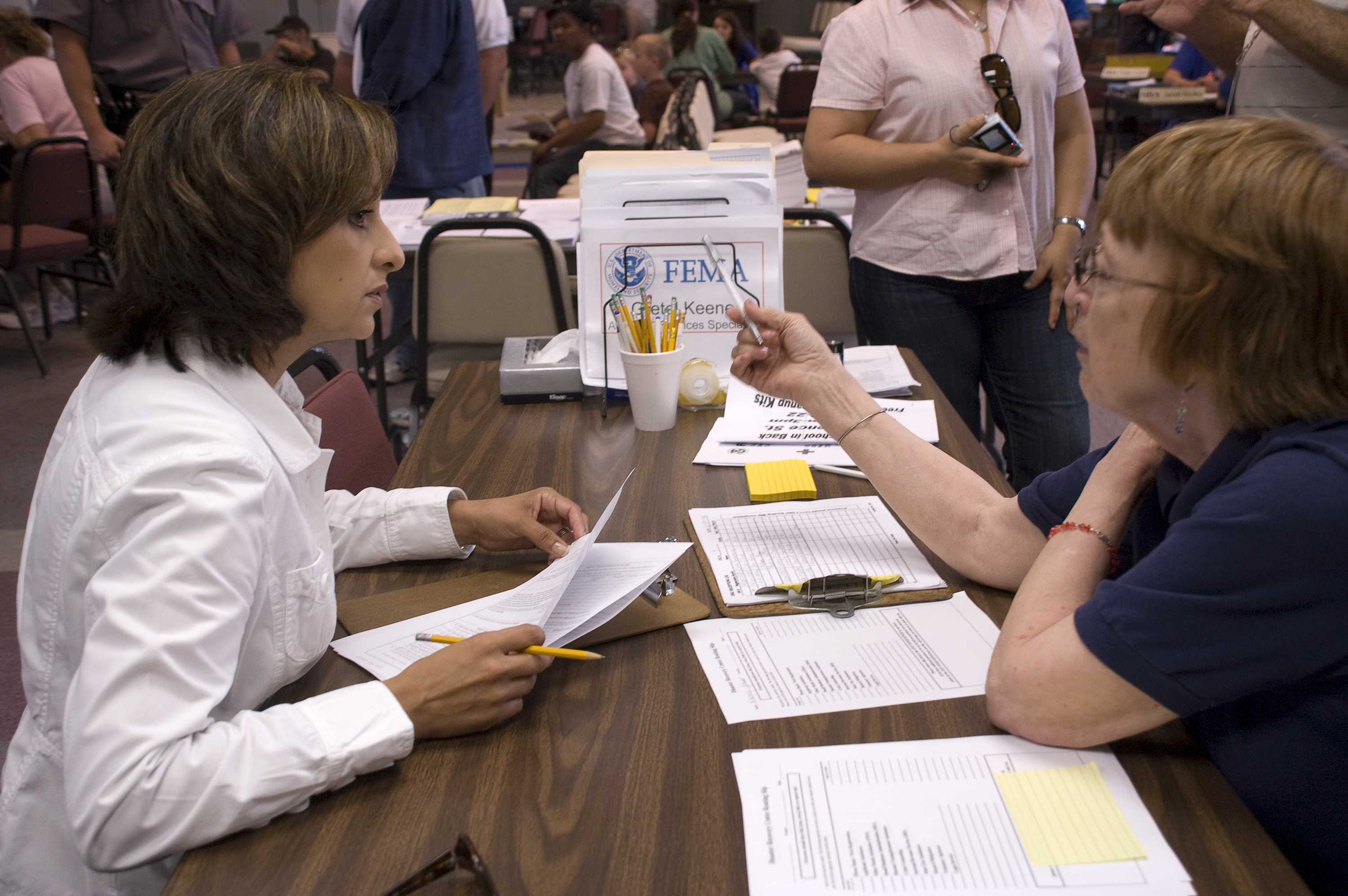
Nancy Montanez-Johner and a FEMA worker at a DRC in Iowa (2008)

Nancy Lou Montanez Johner is an American government official who served as under secretary of agriculture for food, nutrition, and consumer services from August 2006 to January 2009. She previously served as director of the Nebraska Department of Health & Human Services.

== Early life and education ==
Johner is a native of Scottsbluff, Nebraska. She received a Bachelor of Science degree in social work from the University of Nebraska at Kearney.

== Career ==
As director of the Nebraska Department of Health and Human Services, she managed over 5,000 employees, and was responsible for the administration of the Food Stamp Program. As director, she also managed Medicaid, child welfare, child support enforcement, and behavioral health, programs.

=== U.S. Department of Agriculture ===
During Johner's tenure, 26 million people made use of the Food Stamp Program, nearly 80 percent of food stamp benefits went to households with children, over 80 percent of all children who were eligible for benefits received them, and households with children received about $300 in food stamp benefits each month. Congress acted to curb childhood obesity by requiring all school districts participating in USDA school meal programs to establish "Wellness Policies". In June 2007, for Vermont Hunger Awareness Day, she toured the FoodBank Farm in Montpelier, Vermont and the Vermont FoodBank.

==== Proposals for the 2007 farm bill ====
At a congressional hearing about the 2007 farm bill, Johner proposed investing $100 million to establish a five-year competitive grants demonstration program targeted at developing and testing solutions to the rising rates of obesity. She suggested adding $500 million of mandatory funding over 10 years for the purchase of additional fruits and vegetables for use in the National School Lunch and Breakfast Programs.

She also proposed changing the name of the Food Stamps Program, noting that the agency now uses coupons, not stamps. She suggested that the name does not reflect the mission of reducing hunger and improving nutrition for those with low-income. She suggested removing the cap on dependent care deduction for the Food Stamp Program. The policy at the time was $200 per month for children under 2 and $175 for other dependent children. Another proposal was removing combat-related military pay as a cause for families to no longer be eligible for Food Stamps.
