= Jose Emilio Esteban =

Mexican-American agriculture official

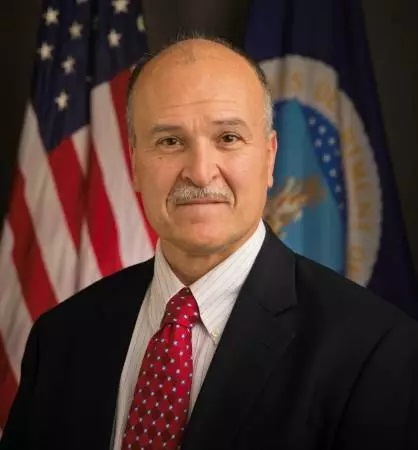

Under Secretary of Agriculture for Food Safety
- In office January 4, 2023 – January 20, 2025
- President: Joe Biden
- Preceded by: Mindy Brashears
- Succeeded by: Mindy Brashears

Personal details
- Education: National Autonomous University of Mexico (MVM); University of California, Davis (MBA, MS, PhD)

Jose Emilio Esteban is a Mexican-American food scientist and former veterinarian who served as under secretary of agriculture for food safety in the Biden administration from 2023 to 2025.

== Education ==
Esteban earned a Doctor of Veterinary Medicine from the National Autonomous University of Mexico. He later earned a Master of Business Administration, Master of Science in preventive veterinary medicine, and PhD in epidemiology from the University of California, Davis.

== Career ==
Esteban began his career as a veterinarian in Mexico. After graduating from University of California, Davis, he joined the Centers for Disease Control and Prevention, serving as a staff epidemiologist, officer with the Epidemic Intelligence Service, and assistant director of the Food Safety Office. He joined the Food Safety and Inspection Service in 2006 and has served as a science advisor, laboratory director, and chief scientist in the department. He is also chair of the Codex Alimentarius Commission Committee on Food Hygiene and vice president of the International Association for Food Protection.
