= Janie Simms Hipp =

American lawyer

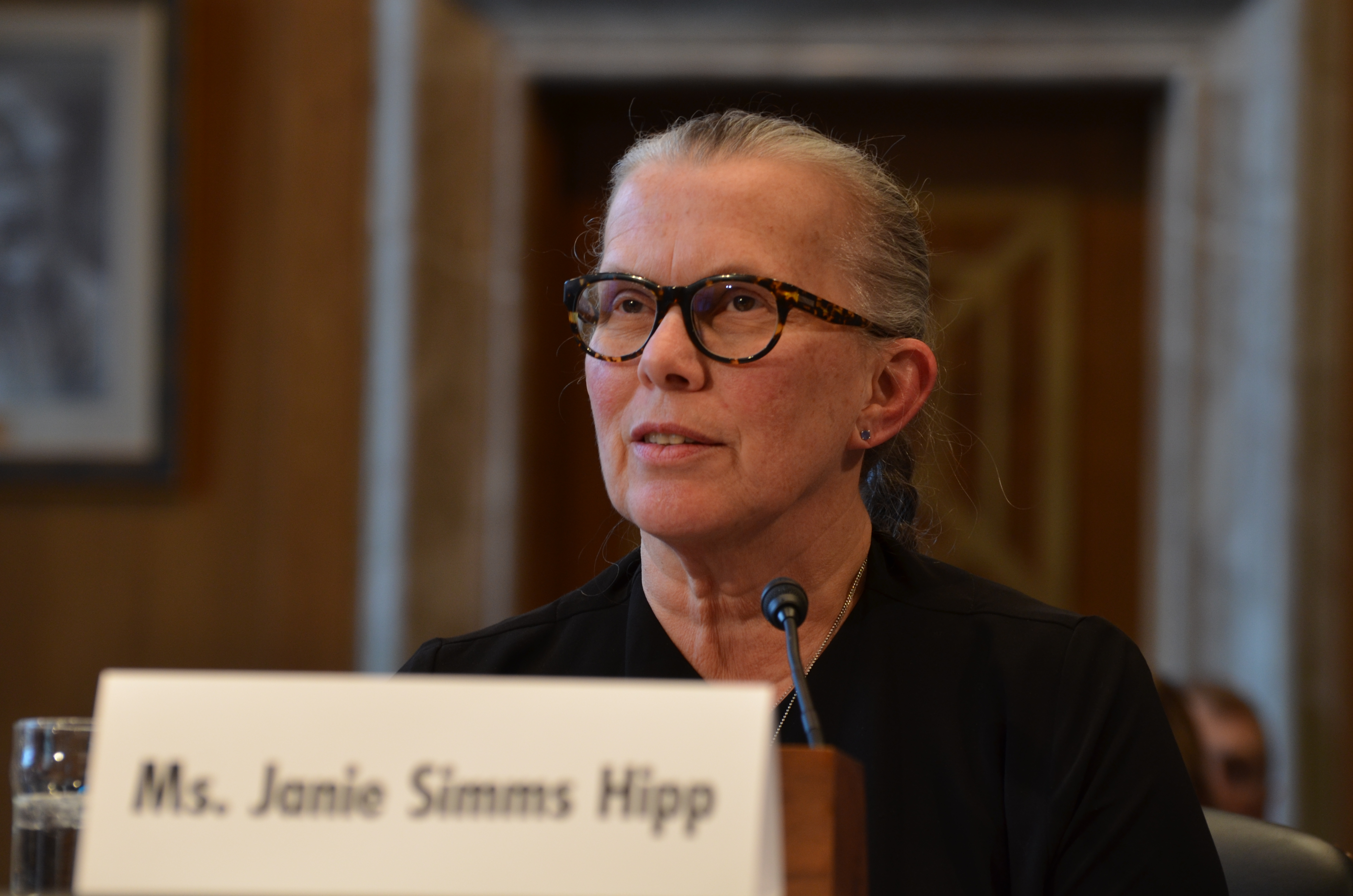
- Janie Simms Hipp testifies before the Senate Committee on Indian Affairs, 2018.

General Counsel of the United States Department of Agriculture
- In office August 1, 2021 – July 31, 2023
- President: Joe Biden
- Secretary: Tom Vilsack
- Preceded by: Stephen Vaden
- Succeeded by: Tyler Clarkson

Personal details
- Born: Idabel, Oklahoma, U.S.
- Citizenship: United States • Chickasaw Nation
- Education: Oklahoma City University School of Law, University of Arkansas
- Occupation: Lawyer, Policy Expert & General Counsel for USDA
- Known for: Founder of USDA's Office of Tribal Relations
- Awards: 2016 President's Volunteer Service Award for lifetime Achievement

Janie Simms Hipp is an agriculture and food lawyer, policy expert, and the founder of the Indigenous Food and Agriculture Initiative at the University of Arkansas, founder of the U.S. Department of Agriculture's (USDA) Office of Tribal Relations in the Office of the Secretary, founding executive director of the Native American Agriculture Fund. Hipp's work focuses on the intersection of Indian law and agriculture and food law. She is currently the CEO/President of Native Agriculture Financial Services since August 2023.

== Early life and education ==
Hipp was born in the Choctaw areas of Oklahoma, grew up in Idabel, and is a member of the Chickasaw Nation. She graduated from University of Oklahoma in 1978, and earned her Juris Doctor from Oklahoma City University School of Law in 1984. From there, Hipp spent eight years working in food and agricultural law as a commercial litigator, and four years in the Oklahoma Attorney General's Office as the agricultural and rural legal affairs advisor. Working during the 1980s farm crisis, she worked to launch state-level initiatives, and provide assistance to Oklahoma and the national agriculture sector to help curb the farm foreclosures of the time. Hipp went on to attend the University of Arkansas School of Law to earn a Master of Law in Agricultural Law in 1996.

== Career ==
Hipp has served in the U.S. Department of Agriculture (USDA) National Institute of Food and Agriculture (NIFA) as National Program Leader for Farm Financial Management, Trade Adjustment Assistance, Risk Management Education, and the Beginning Farmer and Rancher Development Program. She also served as Risk Management Education Director in USDA Risk Management Agency. Under Secretary of Agriculture Tom Vilsack (during the Obama Administration), Hipp served as a senior adviser for tribal relations. During this time, Hipp also founded the USDA's Office of Tribal Relations in the Office of the Secretary and served two terms on the Secretary's advisory Committee for Beginning Farmers and Ranchers. Janie Simms Hipp has also served on two delegations to the United Nations regarding women's and Indigenous issues.

In 2014, Hipp returned to the University of Arkansas as the founding director of the Indigenous Food and Agriculture Initiative and a visiting law professor. In 2018, Hipp was named the founding executive director of the Native American Agriculture Fund (NAAF), a private charity established with leftover funds (cy pres fund) from the Native American Farmer and Rancher Class Action Settlement, Keepseagle v. Vilsack. The Keepseagle case was filed in 1999 and spent 18 years in federal litigation. The case concerned discrimination against Native American farmers and ranchers in the USDA farm and ranch loan program and the servicing of loans once received. The District of Columbia's U.S. District Court approved a $760 million settlement in April 2011. After two rounds of paid claims, $380 million of the settlement remained undisbursed. NAAF was created for the unclaimed amounts, which will be distributed over a twenty-year period. Their mission is "to fund the provision of business assistance, agricultural education, technical support, and advocacy services to Native American farmers and ranchers to support and promote their continued engagement in agriculture."

Janie Simms Hipp was nominated as General Counsel for the USDA on March 15. 2021 by President Joe Biden. She was approved by the U.S. Senate on August 1. In this position, Hipp served as USDA's chief legal officer and oversaw over 200 staff attorneys throughout the United States and in Washington, D.C. She resigned in August 2023 to become the CEO/President of Native Agriculture Financial Services.

== Awards ==
- 2014 Distinguished Alumni, University of Arkansas Alumni Association
- 2014 and 2019 Excellence in Agricultural Law Award, American Agricultural Law Association
- 2016 Distinguished Alumni Award, Oklahoma City University School of Law
- 2016 President's Volunteer Service Award for lifetime Achievement, awarded by President Barack Obama, presented by the Corporation for National and Community Service
- 2017 Tim Wapato Public Advocate of the Year, National Center For American Indian Economic Development
- 2018 Recognition of Leadership, Intertribal Agriculture Council
- 2021 Trailblazer Hunger Leadership Award, Congressional Hunger Center

== Publications ==
- Feeding Ourselves. Prepared by Echo Hawk Consulting, coauthored with Wilson Pipestem and Crystal EchoHawk. Commissioned By The American Heart Association and Voices for Healthy Kids
- Regaining Our Future: An Assessment of Risks and Opportunities for Native Communities in the 2018 Farm Bill. Coauthored with Colby D. Duren. Commissioned by Seeds of Native Health.
- Reimagining Native Food Economies - A vision for Native food and agriculture infrastructure rebuilding and recovery. Contributing authors: Janie Simms Hipp, Valerie Segrest, Karli Moore, Cindy Farlee, Joe L. Graham, Michael Kotutwa Johnson, Toni Stanger-McLaughlin, Sandy Martini, and Graham Gaither for the Native American Agriculture Fund.
- Keeping Native American Communities Connected to the Land: Women as Change Agents, from Rangelands, Society of Range Management. Coauthored with Diana Doan-Crider, Lisa Lone Fight, Valerie Small, and Virginia Yazzie Ashley.
- Land Grants: Back to the Future from Choices, a publication of the Agricultural and Applied Economics Association. Coauthored with Michael V. Martin.
