= Under Secretary of Agriculture for Food, Nutrition, and Consumer Services =

US political position

- Incumbent; Kumar Chandran; Acting since January 16, 2024
- USDA
- Abbreviation: FNCS
- Member of: Cabinet
- Reports to: US Secretary of Agriculture
- Appointer: The president; with Senate advice and consent
- Precursor: Assistant Secretary of Agriculture for Food and Consumer Services
- Formation: 1993
- First holder: Ellen Haas
- Deputy: Deputy Under Secretary of Agriculture for FNCS

The under secretary for food, nutrition, and consumer services is a position created within the United States Department of Agriculture in 1993, and is responsible for administering the department's fifteen nutrition and food security programs and for promoting the dietary guidelines. <7 CFR § 2.19> The food assistance programs have a combined budget of $170.5 billion and include the Food Stamp Program, the Special Supplemental Nutrition Program for Women, Infants and Children, the National School Lunch and School Breakfast Programs, and the Commodity Distribution Programs. In addition, the under secretary oversees the Center for Nutrition Policy and Promotion, which leads the development of dietary guidelines and which promotes the guidelines through MyPlate.

Goals of the Food, Nutrition, and Consumer Services include combatting obesity, promoting better eating and physical activity habits, and helping needy families obtain a nutritious diet. According to The New York Times, the nutrition segment of the Department of Agriculture received 53% of the department's budget at the time of the creation of the position.

The under secretary is appointed by the president and confirmed by the United States Senate. The under secretary manages the Food and Nutrition Services and the Center for Nutrition Policy and Promotion. President Trump did not nominate anyone for that position for the first three years of his presidency. He announced his intent to nominate Brandon Lipps in December 2019, and forwarded his nomination to the Senate on January 6, 2020. His nomination was never confirmed. On February 16, 2023, President Biden appointed Stacy Dean for this deputy under secretary position.

== List of under secretaries ==
No.	Portrait	Name	Office	Took office	Left office	President(s)
1		Mary Ann Keeffe	Acting Under Secretary of Agriculture for Food, Nutrition, and Consumer Services	The position was created on September 7, 1993, when Secretary of Agriculture Mike Espy announced that the title of Assistant Secretary of Agriculture for Food and Consumer Services would be elevated to the present Under Secretary of Food, Nutrition and Consumer Services title.		Bill Clinton (1993–2001)
2		Ellen Haas	Under Secretary of Agriculture for Food, Nutrition, and Consumer Services	1993	1997	Bill Clinton (1993–2001)
3		Shirley Robinson Watkins	Under Secretary of Agriculture for Food, Nutrition, and Consumer Services	1997	2001	Bill Clinton (1993–2001)
4		Eric M. Bost	Under Secretary of Agriculture for Food, Nutrition, and Consumer Services	June 18, 2001	July 20, 2006	George W. Bush (2001–2009)
5		Nancy Montanez Johner	Under Secretary of Agriculture for Food, Nutrition, and Consumer Services	August 21, 2006	2009	George W. Bush (2001–2009)
6		Kevin Concannon	Under Secretary of Agriculture for Food, Nutrition, and Consumer Services	July 2009	2017	Barack Obama (2009–2017)
7		Brandon Lipps	Acting Under Secretary of Agriculture for Food, Nutrition, and Consumer Services	July 19, 2017	2018	Donald Trump (2017–2021)
8		Kumar Chandran	Acting Under Secretary of Agriculture for Food, Nutrition, and Consumer Services	Jan 16, 2024		Donald Trump
9		Patrick Penn	Under Secretary of Agriculture for Food, Nutrition, and Consumer Services	Jun 13, 2025	Jun 17, 2026	Donald Trump
