= James R. Brashears =

American politician

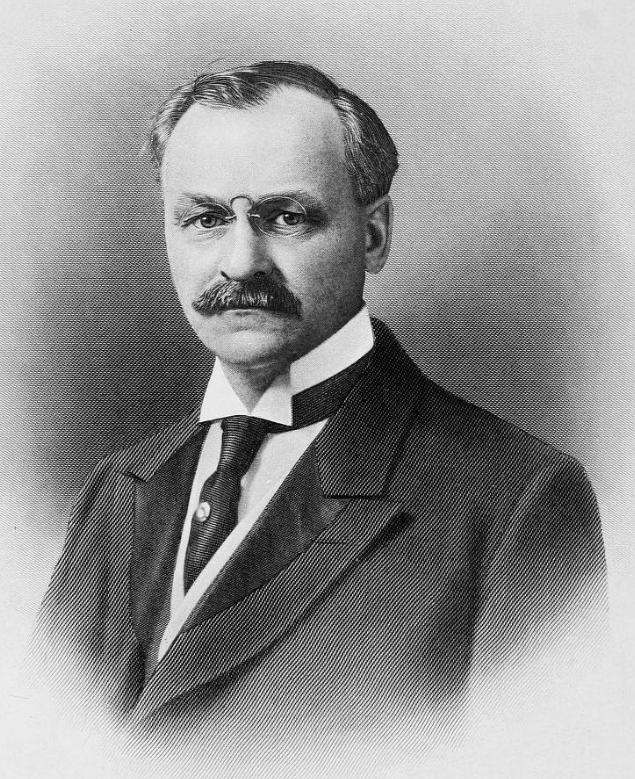

Member of the Maryland State Senate
- In office 1907–1908

Member of the Maryland House of Delegates
- In office 1890, 1892, 1894, 1902

Personal details
- Born: James Russell Brashears; March 13, 1858 Anne Arundel County, Maryland
- Died: August 19, 1917 (aged 59) Annapolis, Maryland
- Party: Democratic
- Spouse: Matilda McCullough Brown (m. 1891)
- Education: West River Academy
- Occupation: Jurist, politician

James Russell Brashears (March 13, 1858 – August 19, 1917) was an American lawyer, politician, and judge, a member of the Maryland House of Delegates and Maryland State Senate.

== Biography ==
Born in Anne Arundel County, Maryland, Brashears attended West River Academy and studied law under his father. He was admitted to the bar in 1887.

He married Matilda McCullough Brown on December 22, 1891.

Politically, he was a Democrat. In 1889, he was elected to the Maryland House of Delegates, and thrice re-elected. During his fourth term, he was chairman of the Judiciary committee. In 1907, he was elected to the Maryland State Senate. In 1908, he left the senate when he was appointed as a judge in the Fifth Judicial Circuit Court by Governor Crothers, a position he was re-elected to and held until his death. He died at home in Annapolis in 1917.
