= Under Secretary of Agriculture for Food Safety =

United States Under Secretary of Agriculture for Food Safety
- Seal of the Department of Agriculture

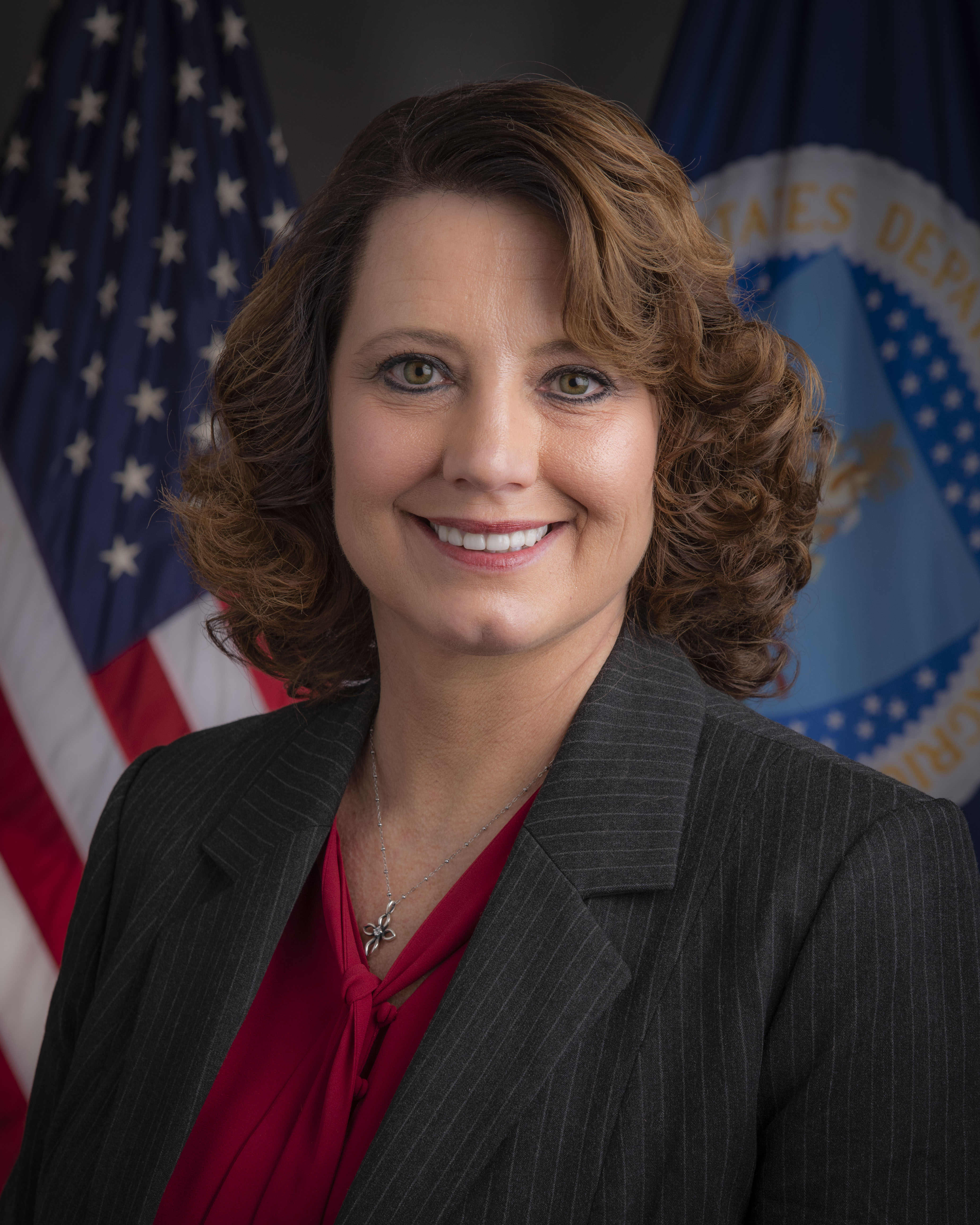
- Incumbent; Mindy Brashears since January 14, 2026
- Formation: October 1994

The under secretary for food safety is a subcabinet position within the United States Department of Agriculture responsible for oversight of the policies and programs of the Food Safety and Inspection Service. The under secretary chairs the U.S. Codex Steering Committee, which provides guidance to U.S. delegations to the Codex Alimentarius Commission. The Food Safety and Inspection Service is responsible for ensuring the nation's supply of meat, poultry, and processed egg products are safe and correctly labeled and packaged.

The under secretary for food safety is appointed by the president and confirmed by the U.S. Senate. The under secretary is selected from among individuals with specialized training or significant experience in food safety or public health programs. The position was created by the Department of Agriculture Reorganization Act of 1994, signed into law in October 1994.

== Under secretaries ==
Mindy Brashears is the current and 7th under secretary for food safety, having been sworn in on January 14, 2026. She was previously the 5th under secretary, and she was confirmed for this second term on December 18, 2025. Jose Emilio Esteban was the 6th and previous under secretary for food safety.

Previous under secretaries include Elisabeth Hagen (August 2010–December 2013), Richard Allen Raymond (July 2005–January 2009), Elsa A. Murano (October 2001–December 2004) and Catherine Woteki (July 1997–January 2001). From December 1, 2004 until July 15, 2005, Merle D. Pierson was acting under secretary. The then-incumbent Food Safety and Inspection Service administrator, Mike Taylor, became the acting under secretary from October 1994 to November 1996.

== See also ==
- Food and Drug Administration
