= Under Secretary of Agriculture for Trade and Foreign Agricultural Affairs =

United States federal government position

United States Under Secretary of Agriculture for Trade and Foreign Agricultural Affairs
- Seal of the Department of Agriculture
- Incumbent; Vacant since September 18, 2026
- Formation: 2014
- First holder: Ted McKinney

The under secretary of agriculture for trade and foreign agricultural affairs is a position within the United States Department of Agriculture. The position was mandated after the passing of the 2014 Farm Bill and officially created in 2017. Ted McKinney served as the first under secretary from 2017 to 2021.
