= Mindy Brashears =

American civil servant (born 1970)

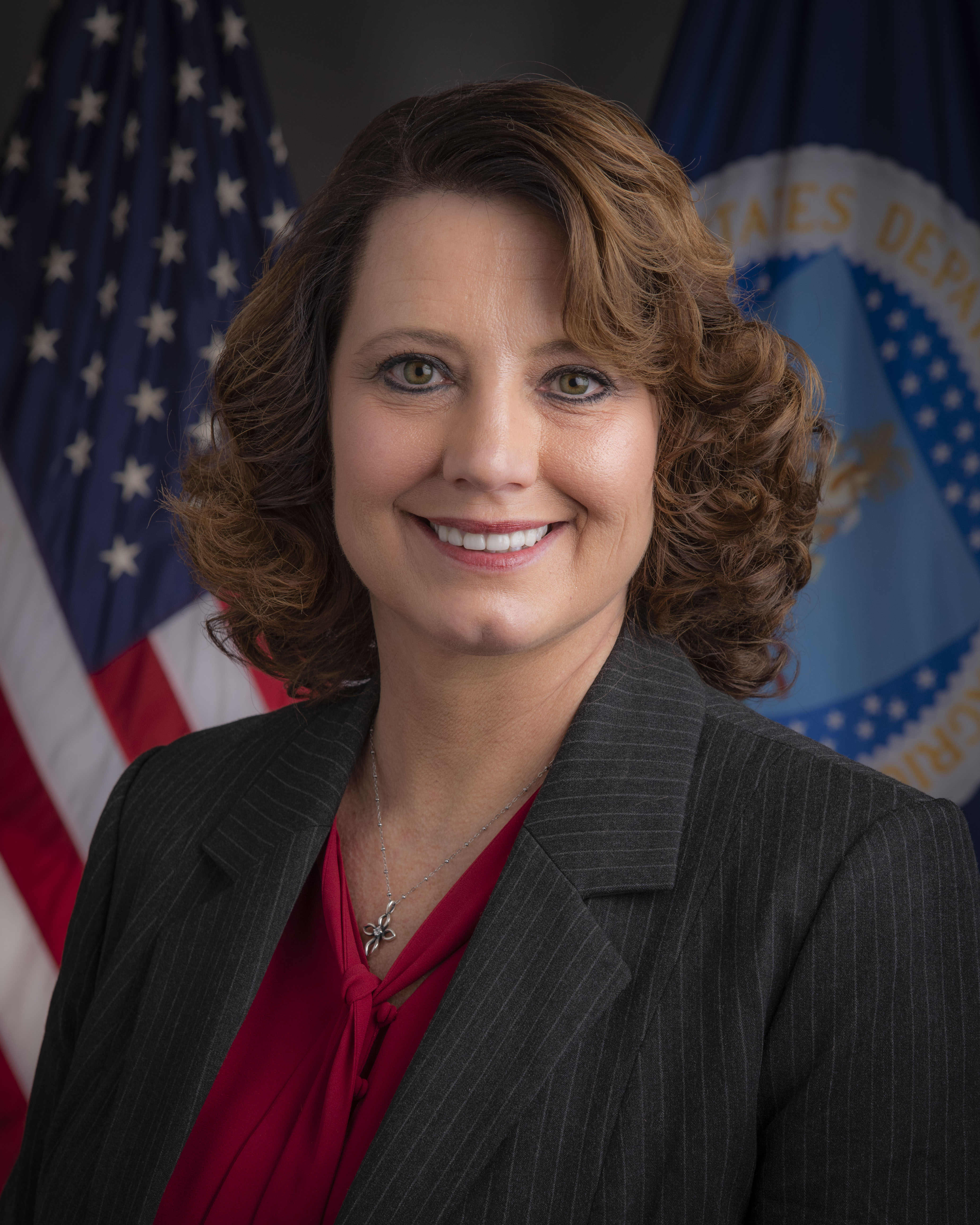
- Official portrait, 2019

5th and 7th Under Secretary for Food Safety, USDA
- Incumbent
- Assumed office January 14, 2026
- President: Donald Trump
- Preceded by: Jose Emilio Esteban
- In office March 23, 2020 (Note: She was made Deputy Under Secretary on January 28, 2019, making her the top person within the Food Safety and Inspection service without the full powers of the position of Under Secretary. She was confirmed on March 23, 2020, but she was only sworn in on October 1, 2020.) – January 20, 2021
- President: Donald Trump
- Preceded by: Elizabeth Hagen
- Succeeded by: Jose Emilio Esteban

Personal details
- Born: Mindy Malynn Hardcastle; May 13, 1970 (age 56) Wheeler, Texas
- Party: Republican
- Spouse: M. Todd Brashears
- Education: Wheeler High School; Texas Tech University (BS); Oklahoma State University (MS, PhD)

Mindy Malynn Brashears (née Hardcastle; born May 13, 1970) is the current Under Secretary for Food Safety at the U.S. Department of Agriculture. She was nominated by President Donald Trump and confirmed by a Senate vote on December 18, 2025. Her responsibilities in this role include leading the nation's Food Safety and Inspection Service (FSIS) and its team of over 10,000 food inspectors and scientists.

She had served previously in the same position from her Senate confirmation in March 23, 2020 to January 20, 2021, similarly nominated by Donald Trump during his first term. During both terms, she chaired the U.S. Codex Alimentarius Steering Committee, which made her the highest-ranking food safety official in the U.S. government during her first tenure.

Between her first and second terms at USDA, she returned to her role as professor of food microbiology and food safety at Texas Tech University where she was the director for the International Center for Food Industry Excellence.

== Early life and education ==
Brashears was born as Mindy Malynn Hardcastle in Wheeler, Texas. She grew up on a cattle and cotton farm, the daughter of Gary and Becky Hardcastle. Brashears graduated from Wheeler High School and went to Texas Tech University in Lubbock, where she majored in Food Technology within the Department of Animal and Food Sciences. She attended school on scholarship from the Houston Livestock Show and Rodeo. Brashears graduated from Texas Tech in 1992, then attended graduate school at Oklahoma State University. There, she earned an M.S. (1994) and a Ph.D. (1997) in food science with an emphasis in food microbiology under the tutelage of Stan Gilliland.

== Academic career ==
Brashears worked at the University of Nebraska–Lincoln as the State Extension Food Safety Specialist from August 1997 until May 2001. From June 2001 until January 2019 she served as assistant professor, associate professor and professor of food safety at Texas Tech University. During her time at Texas Tech, she was also the director of the International Center for Food Industry Excellence as well as a faculty member for the Center for Biodefense, Law and Public Policy in the Texas Tech School of Law. She was a prolific researcher and author with over 130 research papers cited over 2,700 times resulting in an index of 37.2 on ResearchGate.

In 2016, she was selected as a Fellow in the National Academy of Inventors. Her induction ceremony took place on April 6, 2017, as part of the NAI's sixth annual convention at the John F. Kennedy Presidential Library and Museum in Boston.

=== Meat industry consulting ===
Before her nomination to the USDA in 2018, Brashears served as a paid consultant for major meat-producing companies subject to federal inspection and regulation, including Cargill and Perdue Farms. After her departure in 2021, she accepted positions with Boar's Head Provision Company and the Meat Institute. Some consumer and food safety advocates argued that Brashear's nomination posed issues related to conflict of interest.

== COVID-19 pandemic actions ==
The United States House Select Oversight Subcommittee on the Coronavirus Crisis released a report in May 2022 detailing the relationship between the Trump administration and the meat packing industry during the COVID-19 pandemic. In the report, Brashear was described as the "go-to fixer" for the meat packing plants. A meat packing lobbyist described a close relationship with Brashear, who was able to prevent local health departments from enforcing COVID-19 safety measures at plants. The report described Brashear providing her personal phone number and email address to industry representatives, in violation of the Federal Records Act.

== Public life ==
In June 2017, Brashears provided expert testimony in the case of Beef Products Inc. (BPI) versus American Broadcasting Companies, Inc., ABC News and other named individuals. BPI's lawyer, Dan Webb contended that ABC's use of the phrase "pink slime" in 2012 made BPI lose customers. During her testimony regarding the legal definition of "beef" she stated, "Slime is not beef. It does not meet any of the definitions of beef. It is false to call LFTB 'pink slime.' It is not 'pink slime." ABC and BPI settled the case, reportedly for $177 million.
