= Under Secretary of Agriculture for Natural Resources and Environment =

United States Under Secretary of Agriculture for Natural Resources and Environment

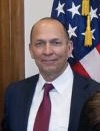
- Incumbent; Michael Boren since January 20, 2026
- Website: Official web

The under secretary of agriculture for natural resources and environment, or USA(NRE), is a high-ranking official in the United States Department of Agriculture and the principal advisor to the secretary of agriculture on policy to promote the conservation and sustainable use of the nation's natural resources.

The under secretary is appointed by the president of the United States with the consent of the United States Senate to serve at the pleasure of the president.

== Overview ==
The under secretary of agriculture for natural resources and environment promotes the conservation and sustainable use of natural resources on the nation's private lands and sustains production of all the goods and services that the public demands of the national forests. The under secretary is responsible for the day-to-day operations of the United States Forest Service.

With the rank of under secretary, the USC(NRE) is a Level III position within the Executive Schedule. Since January 2024, the annual rate of pay for Level III is $204,000.

== Reporting officials ==
Officials reporting to the USA(NRE) include:

- Deputy Under Secretary of Agriculture for Natural Resources and Environment - Forestry
- Deputy Under Secretary of Agriculture for Natural Resources and Environment - Natural Resources
- Chief of the Forest Service
  - United States Forest Service
