= Hofstra Law Review =

- Language: English

Publication details
- History: 1973–present
- Publisher: Hofstra University School of Law (USA)
- Frequency: quarterly

Standard abbreviations
- Bluebook: Hofstra L. Rev.
- ISO 4: Hofstra Law Rev.

Indexing
- ISSN: 0091-4029
- OCLC no.: 818988472

Links
- Journal homepage

The Hofstra Law Review, an entirely student run organization, is the flagship law review of the Hofstra University School of Law. As of 2021, Hofstra Law Review ranks 68 out of 330 flagship law reviews by the influential Washington and Lee Law Review ranking. Its inaugural issue was published in 1973. The Hofstra Law Review is published quarterly.

The Law Review oversees the Hofstra Law Review Alumni Association, The mission of which is to "get in touch with alumni of the Law Review to help build a strong network of Law Review alumni".

In 2005, the Hofstra Law Review began publishing a new section entitled "Ideas." "Ideas" serve as the vehicle for short pieces—from three to 10 pages in length and having a minimal number of footnotes—on topics of interest to scholars and practitioners. There are no subject-matter restrictions and no requirement that the pieces relate to one another. "Ideas" is a collection of brief observations on important legal questions.

== Notable contributors ==
- Tom C. Clark, Changing Times, 1 Hofstra L. Rev. 1 (1973).
- Arthur J. Goldberg, Mediation and Arbitration of International Disputes, 1 Hofstra L. Rev. 9 (1973).
- Stephen Breyer, The Federal Sentencing Guidelines and the Key Compromises Upon Which They Rest, 17 Hofstra L. Rev. 1 (1988).
- Mario M. Cuomo, A Symposium on Ethics in Government, 16 Hofstra L. Rev. 287 (1988).
- Neil Gorsuch & Michael Guzman, Will the Gentlemen Please Yield? A Defense of the Constitutionality of State-Imposed Term Limitations, 20 Hofstra L. Rev. 341 (1991).
- Richard A. Posner, The Strangest Attack Yet on Law and Economics, 20 Hofstra L. Rev. 933 (1992).
- Ruth Bader Ginsburg, Constitutional Adjudication in the United States as a Means of Advancing the Equal Stature of Men and Women Under the Law, 26 Hofstra L. Rev. 263 (1997).
- Akhil Reed Amar, On Impeaching Presidents, 28 Hofstra L. Rev. 291 (1999).
- Margaret Thatcher, Reflections on Liberty, 28 Hofstra L. Rev. 869 (2000).
- Abbe Smith, Defending Defending: The Case for Unmitigated Zeal on Behalf of People Who Do Terrible Things, 28 Hofstra L. Rev. 925 (2000).
- Monroe H. Freedman, In Praise of Overzealous Representation: Lying to Judges, Deceiving Third Parties, and Other Ethical Conduct, 34 Hofstra L. Rev. 771 (2006).
- Ronald D. Rotunda, Judicial Ethics, the Appearance of Impropriety, and the Proposed New ABA Judicial Code, 34 Hofstra L. Rev. 1337 (2006).
- Paul D. Clement, Lawyering in the Supreme Court, 38 Hofstra L. Rev. 909 (2010).
- John Ashcroft, Whistleblowers Cash In, Unwary Corporations Pay, 40 Hofstra L. Rev. 367 (2011).

== Notable alumni ==
- John J. Farley, III, former judge for the United States Court of Appeals for Veterans Claims, founding Editor-in-Chief
- Thomas C. Wales, federal prosecutor (assassinated), former editor-in-chief, Volume 7
- Maryanne Trump Barry, senior circuit judge for the United States Court of Appeals for the Third Circuit, former Staff Member, Volume 2

== See also ==
Hofstra Labor and Employment Law Journal
