= Sami Esmail trial =

1978 prosecution of American citizen in Israel

In 1978 Sami Esmail, a 24-year-old American citizen of Palestinian descent, was prosecuted in Israel for membership in the Popular Front for the Liberation of Palestine. The case generated a great deal of interest in the US, especially in the Arab American community and at Michigan State University, where Esmail was an Electrical Engineering graduate student.

Esmail flew to Israel in December 1977 to visit his dying father, who lived in Ramallah. He was arrested on his arrival at Ben-Gurion Airport on December 21 and signed a confession after being imprisoned for six days. Esmail and his supporters in the United States claimed that he had been tortured or mistreated, held without access to a lawyer, and coerced into signing a false confession, among other arguments. Monroe Freedman and Alan Dershowitz visited Israel to observe the trial and wrote a long editorial in The New York Times defending the Israeli government's conduct in the case and Israel's human rights record in general.

Esmail was represented at his trial by the well-known Israeli lawyer Felicia Langer. In June 1978 he was convicted of membership in a hostile organization and sentenced to 15 months in prison, recorded from the date of his arrest. He was released and deported in October 1978, having served 10 months of his sentence. The case later resurfaced at a 1989 American extradition hearing, at which Esmail, Dershowitz, and Freedman all testified, and was mentioned in books by Dershowitz and his critic Norman Finkelstein.

== The trial ==
Esmail was tried before a three-judge panel headed by Dov Levin. His conviction was based on his statements in the disputed confession and in court. Esmail had stated that he had been recruited at MSU, had donated money to the PFLP and assisted in distributing its literature, and had traveled to Libya in 1976 for ideological instruction and military training. Langer had challenged Esmail's confession in court, alleging that he had been kicked, beaten, and deprived of sleep until he had agreed to sign it. However, the court accepted the confession as valid. The court acknowledged that Esmail had come to Israel to visit his father, not on behalf of the PFLP. Esmail was acquitted on the more serious charge of "contact with a foreign agent" on the grounds that the PFLP did not represent a foreign government.

== American reaction ==
American supporters charged that Esmail had been held without access to a lawyer, interrogated harshly, and threatened with being prevented from seeing his dying father unless he signed a confession, rendering his confession invalid. They also argued that Israel was overstepping its authority by trying an American citizen over actions that were legal in the places where they allegedly occurred; the New York Times described this as "the issue of overriding interest" in the case.

In March 1978 pro-Esmail protests were held in New York, Boston, Washington, Detroit, East Lansing, and San Francisco. The city council of Detroit (which had a large Arab-American population) passed a resolution in support of Esmail.
