= Eric Lane =

Eric Lane may refer to:

- Eric Lane (actor) (born 1976), African American actor
- Eric Lane (legal scholar) (born 1943), professor of public law and public service at Hofstra University
- Eric Lane (running back, born 1959), former American football running back
- Eric Lane (running back, born 1974), former American football running back
