= Maurice A. Deane School of Law =

Law school at Hofstra University

Coordinates: 40.712126°N 73.599454°W

Maurice A. Deane School of Law at Hofstra University
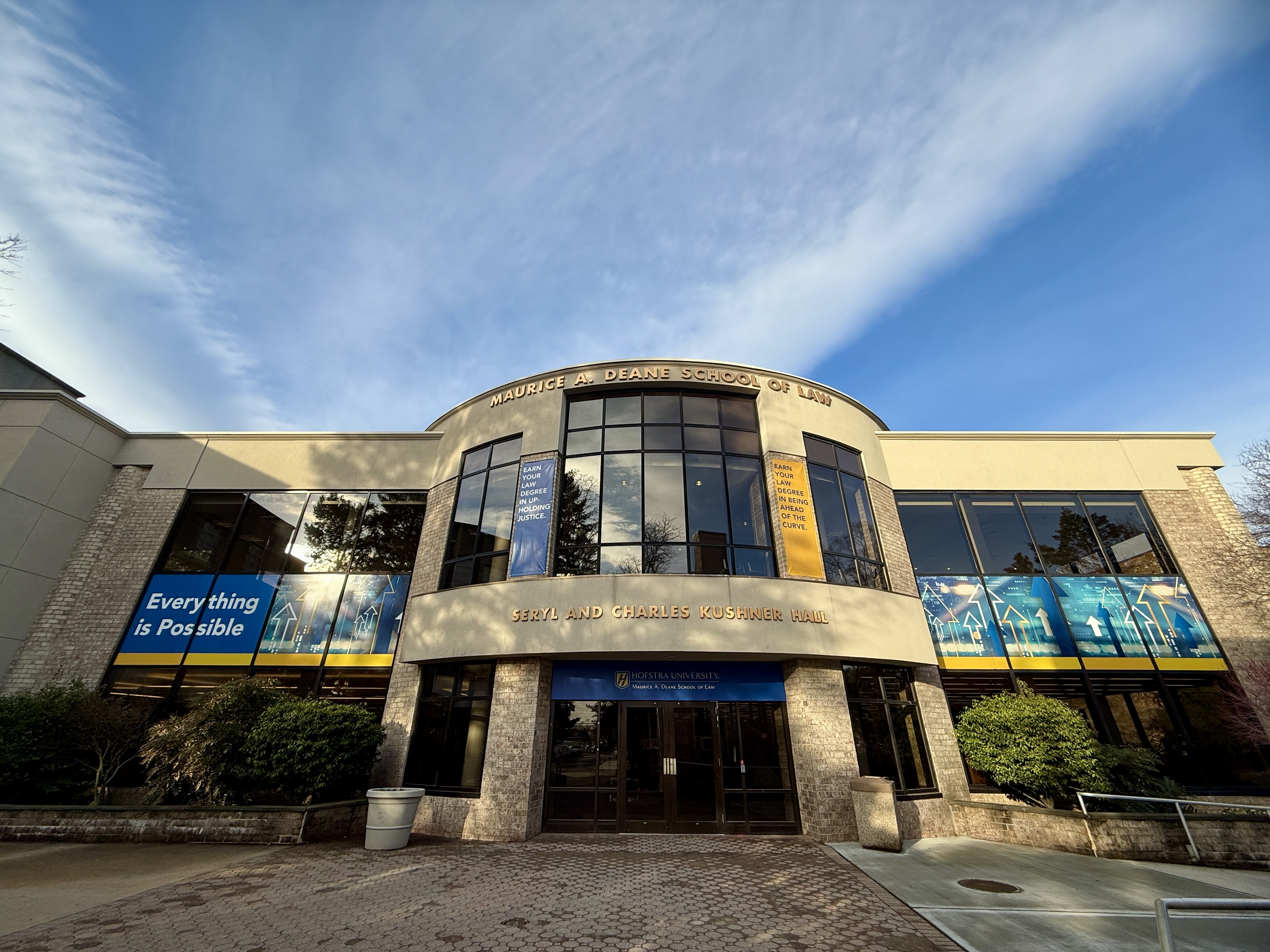
- The main entrance to Kushner Hall in 2025
- Established: 1970; 56 years ago
- School type: Private
- Dean: Jenny Roberts
- Location: Hempstead, New York, US
- Enrollment: 271
- Faculty: 173; 53 full-time and 120 part-time
- USNWR ranking: 125th (2025)
- Bar pass rate: 82% (July 2024 NY first-time takers)
- Website: law.hofstra.edu
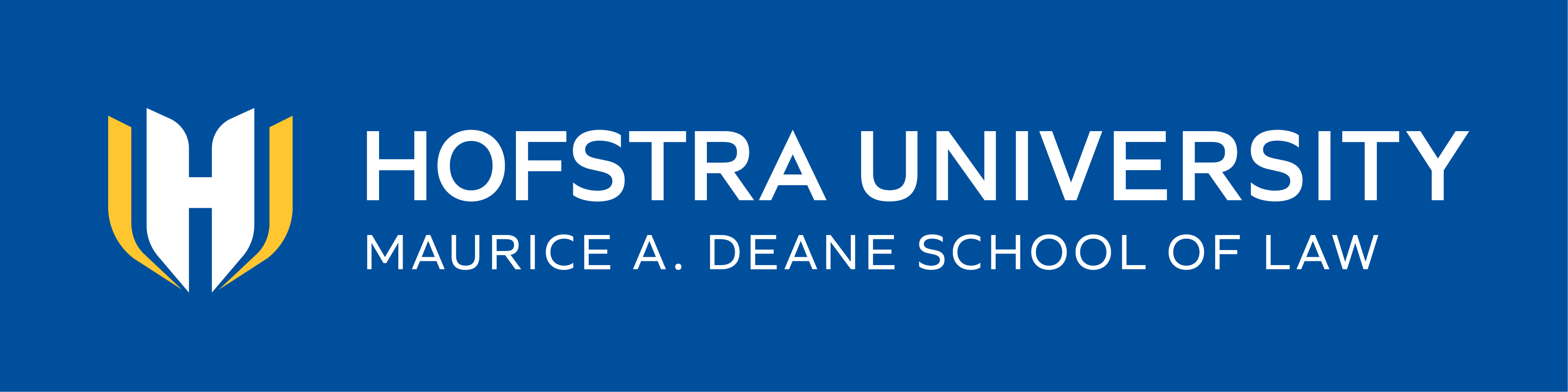

The Maurice A. Deane School of Law at Hofstra University, also known as Hofstra Law School and colloquially as Hofstra Law, is a law school located in Hempstead, on Long Island, in New York, United States. It is affiliated with – and located on the campus of – Hofstra University.

== Overview ==
Founded in 1970 and accredited by the ABA in 1971, the school offers JD, MA, and LLM programs, as well as joint degrees. A two-year JD program for foreign-trained lawyers is available, as well as a paralegal certificate program.

As of 2025, Hofstra Law had a student-faculty ratio of 9:1. It offers over 40 affinity groups and student organizations.

Hofstra Law is widely recognized as a pioneer in fully integrating clinical education into traditional law school curriculum, with 11 clinical programs or practicums.

The law school is on the southern part of the 244-acre (0.99 km^{2}) Hofstra University campus. The school was renamed the Maurice A. Deane School of Law at Hofstra University in September 2011.

== History ==
Hofstra Law was founded in 1970 by Malachy Mahon, the law school's first dean, and the youngest law school dean in the country at age 34. At the time, Hofstra Law was the first law school started in New York in 45 years. Mahon left a position at Fordham Law School to become Hofstra Law's administrator in 1968 and was responsible for choosing all of the faculty and developing the curriculum for the school. The first class consisted of 79 students.

The first members of the faculty were appointed in 1969, and the school was officially founded in 1970.

Hofstra Law won full recognition in 1973, becoming accredited by the Association of American Law Schools, before the law school graduated its first class in June of that year.

Hofstra Law was one of the first to establish clinical education, starting The Neighborhood Law Office to provide legal assistance to individuals of limited means, while providing Hofstra Law students with clinical experience.

== Academics ==
Hofstra Law offers Juris Doctor concentrations in Business Law, Corporate Compliance, Criminal Law and Procedure, Family Law, Health Law, Intellectual Property Law, and International Law.

In addition, Hofstra Law offers joint degree programs including a JD/MBA with Hofstra's Frank G. Zarb School of Business and a JD/MPH in conjunction with Hofstra's School of Health Sciences and Human Services, along with LLM programs both in person and online.

=== Degree programs ===
- JD program
- JD/MA in Bioethics
- JD/Master of Business Administration (JD/MBA)
- JD/Master of Public Health (JD/MPH)
- JD/Master of Linguistics: Foreign Linguistics (JD/MALFL)
- MA Bioethics
- LLM American Legal Studies
- LLM Family Law

=== Online programs ===
- LLM Health Law and Policy
- MA Health Law and Policy

=== Experiential learning ===
Hofstra Law offers experiential programs for students to gain hands-on experience. All Hofstra Law students participate in an experiential learning course during their second year.

Clinical and practicum programs offered at Hofstra Law School include:

- Asylum Clinic
- Community and Economic Development Clinic
- Clinical Prosecution Practicum
- Defender Clinic
- Deportation Defense Clinic
- Law Reform Advocacy Clinic
- Legal Hand Call-in Center
- Hofstra-Northwell Medical-Legal Partnership
- Pro Se Legal Assistance Program
- Robert W. Entenmann Veterans Law Clinic
- Youth Advocacy Clinic

=== Centers and institutes ===
Hofstra Law houses several centers and institutes fostering research, education, and action on critical issues.

- The Wilbur F. Breslin Center for Real Estate Studies
- The Center for Applied Legal Reasoning
- The Robert and Priscilla Livingston Center for Children, Families and the Law
- Center for Intellectual Property Law
- Center for Legal Advocacy
- Monroe H. Freedman Institute for the Study of Legal Ethics
- Gitenstein Institute for Health Law and Policy
- Law, Logic and Technology Research Laboratory
- Perry Weitz Mass Torts Institute

In an effort to help educate not just its own students, but also lawyers, paralegals and legal support personnel in the skills needed for 21st-century lawyering, Hofstra Law introduced the Legal Tech Skills Certificate to teach the skills needed for programs which lawyers use every day.

== Facilities ==
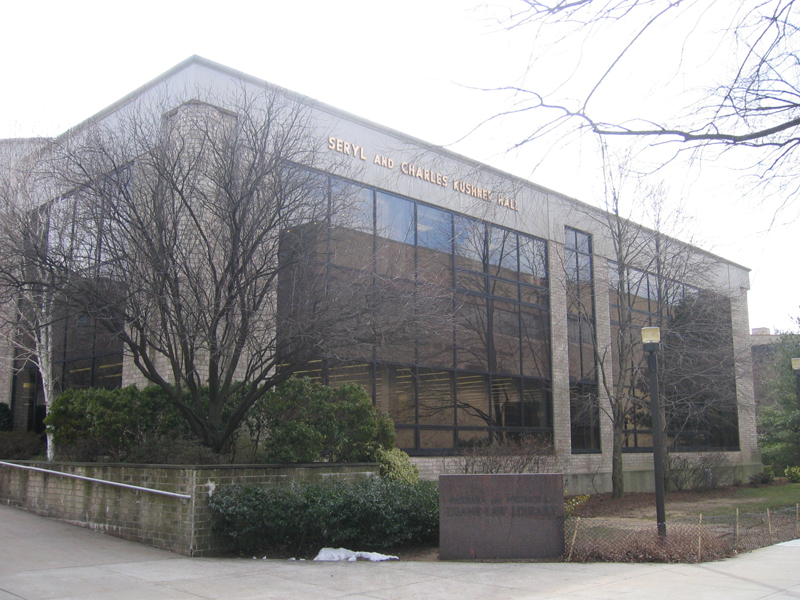
The exterior of the law school's library, located in Kushner Hall

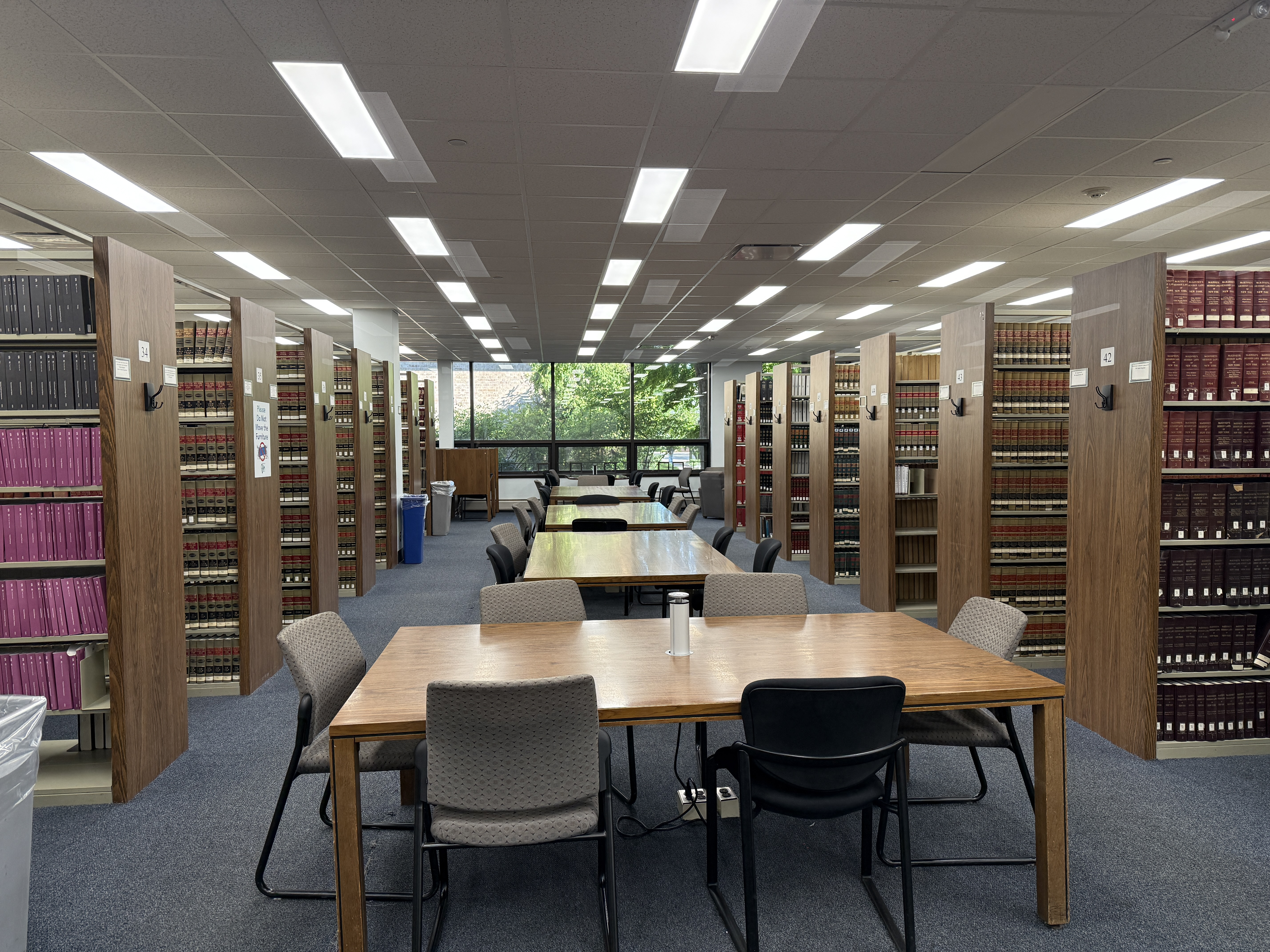
The interior of the Hofstra Law Library in 2026

Hofstra Law is located on the campus of Hofstra University. Kushner Hall and Koppelman Hall contain most of Hostra Law's classrooms, faculty offices and administrative offices, as well as the two level Barbara and Maurice A. Deane Law Library, Law, Logic and Technology Lab, the Weitz & Luxenberg Trial Courtroom, and the Sidney R. Siben and Walter Siben Moot Courtroom. Wireless internet can be accessed throughout the campus.

In the early 1990s, the school added a new building, Joan Axinn Hall, which houses its growing clinical programs and Enrollment Management. Hofstra Law expanded into neighboring Roosevelt Hall in 2006, with new space for a seminar room and its five student-run journals and other student organizations.

In total, the law school operates out of four buildings: Koppleman Hall (classrooms, offices, and courtrooms), Kushner Hall (library, atrium, and offices), Joan Axinn Hall (admissions and clinics), and Roosevelt Hall (offices for each journal and the moot court).

== Faculty ==
As of 2025, Hofstra Law had 53 full-time faculty members. The faculty included (or had included in the past) Nora Demleitner (past member), Alafair Burke (no longer practicing), Monroe Freedman (deceased), Robert A. Baruch Bush, Aaron Twerski (past member), and Eric Lane (non-attorney), Stuart Rabinowitz, and Julian Ku.

Per the 2024 Standard 509 Information Report filed with the ABA, full-time faculty included 24 men, 29 women and 11 people of color. Part-time faculty included 69 men, 50 women and 23 people of color.

== Rankings ==
In the 2025 U.S. News & World Report rankings for law schools, Hofstra Law ranked 125th nationally. That same year, U.S. News and World Report ranked Hofstra Law #8 for Best Trial Advocacy Program. In the 2023 winter issue of preLaw magazine, Hofstra Law received an "A" rating for its trial advocacy offerings.

PreLaw magazine awarded Hofstra Law an "A" rating for its Alternative Dispute Resolution offerings in its Spring 2025 issue (Vol. 28, No. 4), and in its "Back to School" 2024 issue, the magazine awarded Hofstra Law an "A-" rating for its Family Law offerings. In the 2023 "Back to School" issue, Hofstra Law was one of only 15 schools that received an "A+" rating, which it received for its Health Law offerings.

In 2024, Hofstra Law was named one of the top 50 "go-to" law schools by law.com. This is a list of law schools with the highest percentage of 2023 JD graduates who are hired as associates at the nation's largest 100 law firms.

In 2022, Hofstra Law was named among the top 25 most innovative law schools by preLaw magazine in their Winter issue. In 2015, Hofstra Law was named a top 10 school in teaching the technology of practice by the ABA.

== Admission statistics ==
For the 2024 entering class, 86% of applicants were accepted with 18.90% enrolling, with the 50th percentile of enrolled students having a 155 LSAT score and a 3.62 GPA.

== Employment ==
According to Hofstra Law's 2024 ABA-required disclosures, 90% of the Class of 2023 obtained full- time, long-term, JD-required employment nine months after graduation. Hofstra's Law School Transparency under-employment score is 5.4%, indicating the percentage of the Class of 2023 unemployed, pursuing an additional degree, or working in a non-professional, short-term, or part-time position.

For the July 2023 New York bar exam, 80.15% of Hofstra Law graduates who were first-time exam takers passed the bar, vs. an 86.33% average for graduates of New York ABA-accredited schools.

== Journals ==
=== Student edited ===
- Hofstra Law Review (Est. 1973)
- Hofstra Labor and Employment Law Journal (Est. 1982)
- Hofstra Journal of International Business and Law (Est. 1999)

=== Peer reviewed ===
- Family Court Review
- ACTEC Law Journal of the American College of Trust and Estate Counsel (ACTEC).

== Costs ==
Annual tuition at Hofstra Law for the 2024–2025 academic year is $35,435 per term. The Law School Transparency estimated debt-financed cost of attendance for three years is $396,882.

Only 15.8% of students pay full price, and 42.1% receive a discount greater than or equal to $35,000.

== Alumni ==
=== Government ===
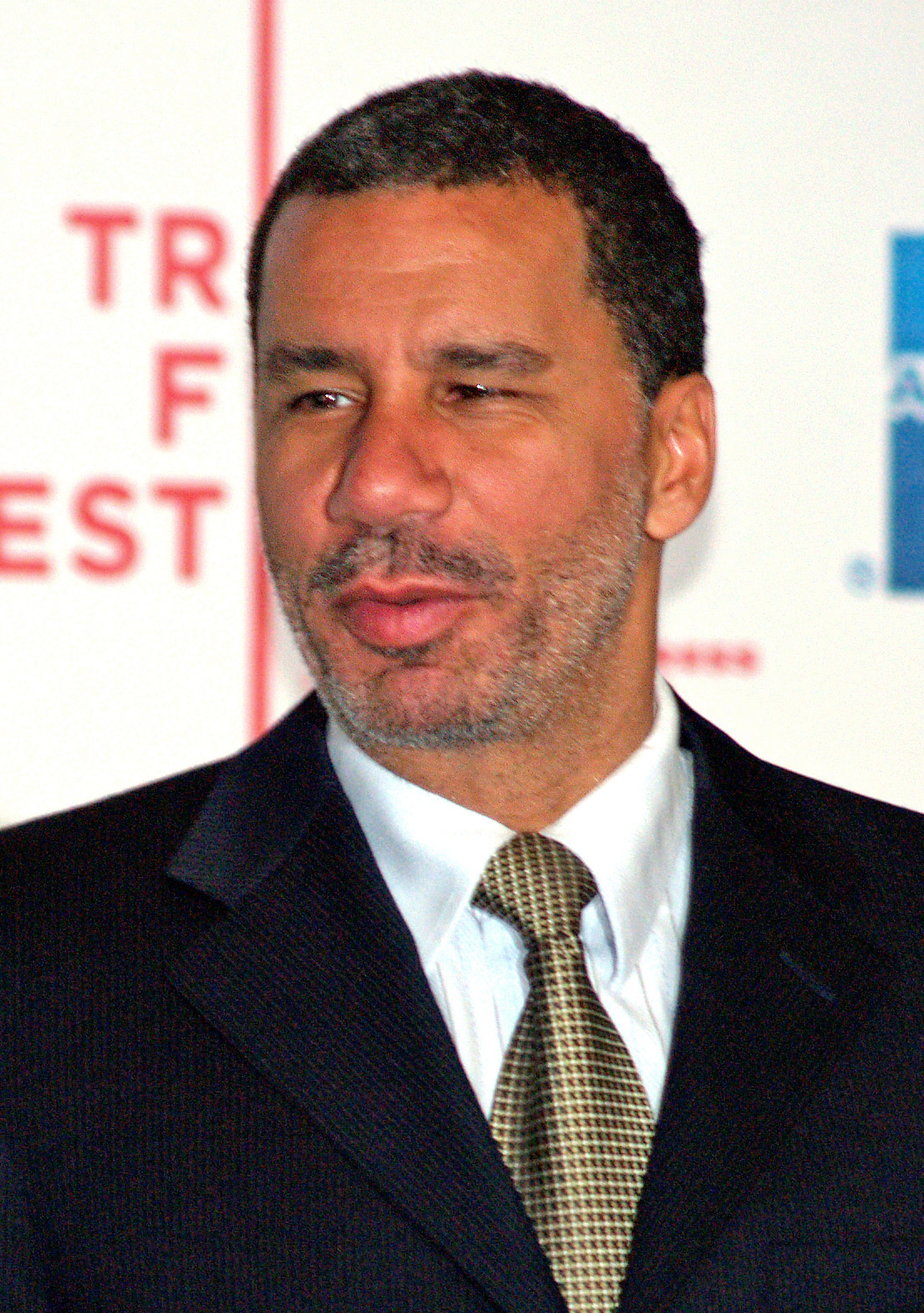
David Paterson

- Matt Ahearn, served in the New Jersey General Assembly (2002–04)
- Joseph Borg, the Securities Commissioner of Alabama since 1994
- Jon Bramnick, member and minority leader of the New Jersey General Assembly, representing the 21st district since 2003
- Ann-Margaret Carrozza, member of the New York State Assembly (1997-2010)
- Joe Ferriero ('82), the Bergen County Democratic Organization Chairman (1998-2009)
- Andrew R. Gabarino ('09), U.S. Congressman, United States House of Representatives (2021-); former member of the New York State Assembly for the 7th District (2013-2020)
- Neil Levin, Executive Director of the Port Authority of New York and New Jersey, murdered in the September 11 terrorist attacks on the World Trade Center
- Edward P. Mangano ('87), Nassau County Executive (2010–17)
- Thomas McKevitt ('96), member of the New York State Assembly (2006–17)
- David Paterson ('83), former governor of New York, former lieutenant governor and minority leader of the New York State Senate
- Luis R. Sepulveda ('91), Member of the New York State Senate, former member of the New York State Assembly
- Richard Socarides, former White House adviser under President Bill Clinton (1993–99)
- Thomas C. Wales ('79), assassinated federal prosecutor
- David Weprin ('80), member of the New York State Assembly since 2010. former member of New York City Council, former deputy superintendent of the New York State Banking Commission, former chairman of New York's Securities Industry Association

=== Judges ===
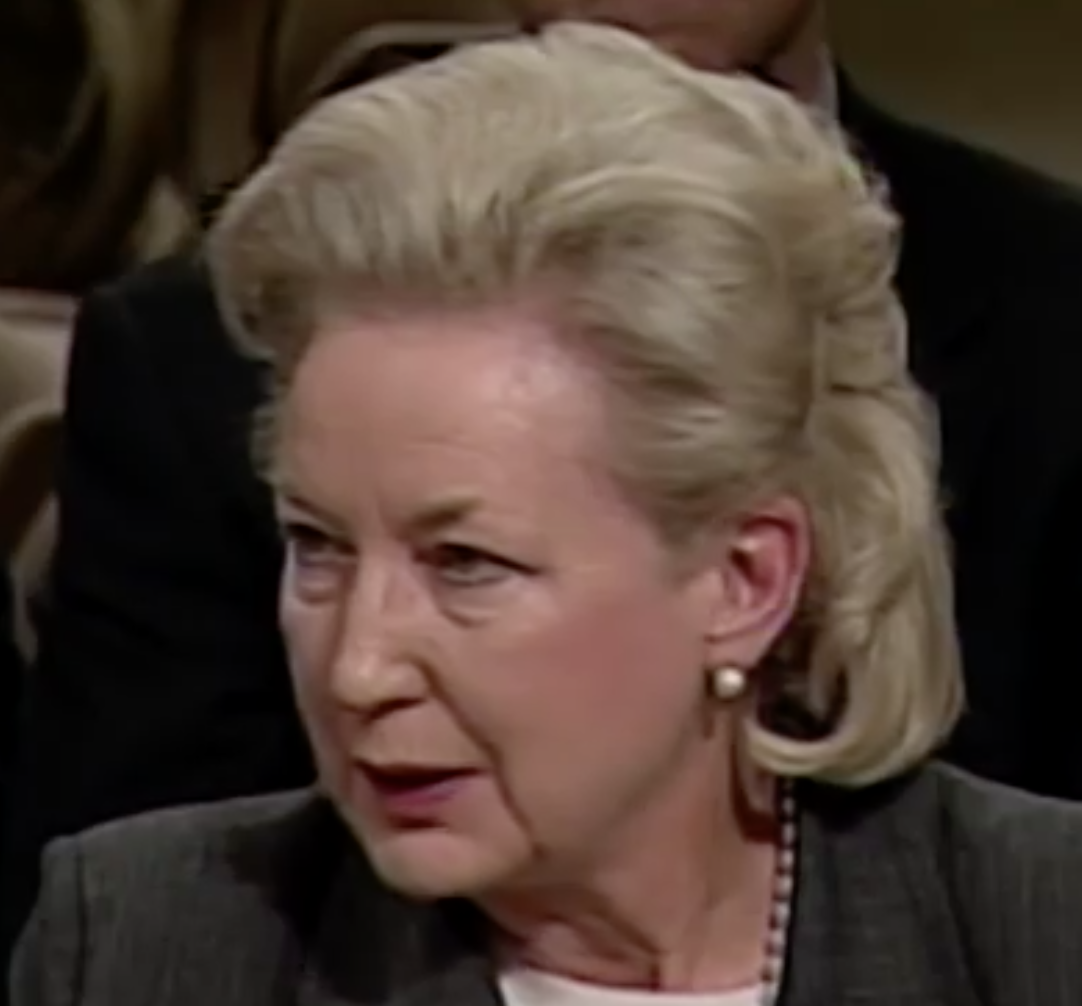
Maryanne Trump Barry

- Maryanne Trump Barry ('74), former judge on the U.S. Court of Appeals for the Third Circuit, sister of 45th and 47th U.S. president Donald Trump
- John J. Farley III ('73), former judge of the U.S. Court of Appeals for Veterans Claims
- Neal Hendel ('76), Justice of the Supreme Court of Israel
- Sallie Manzanet-Daniels ('88), Associate Justice of the New York State Supreme Court, Appellate Division, First Department
- Juan Merchan ('94), acting justice of the New York State Supreme Court
- Norman St. George ('88), First Deputy Chief Administrative Judge, New York State
- Gail A. Weilheimer ('95) United States district judge of the United States District Court for the Eastern District of Pennsylvania, former judge of the Montgomery County Court of Common Pleas

=== Other ===
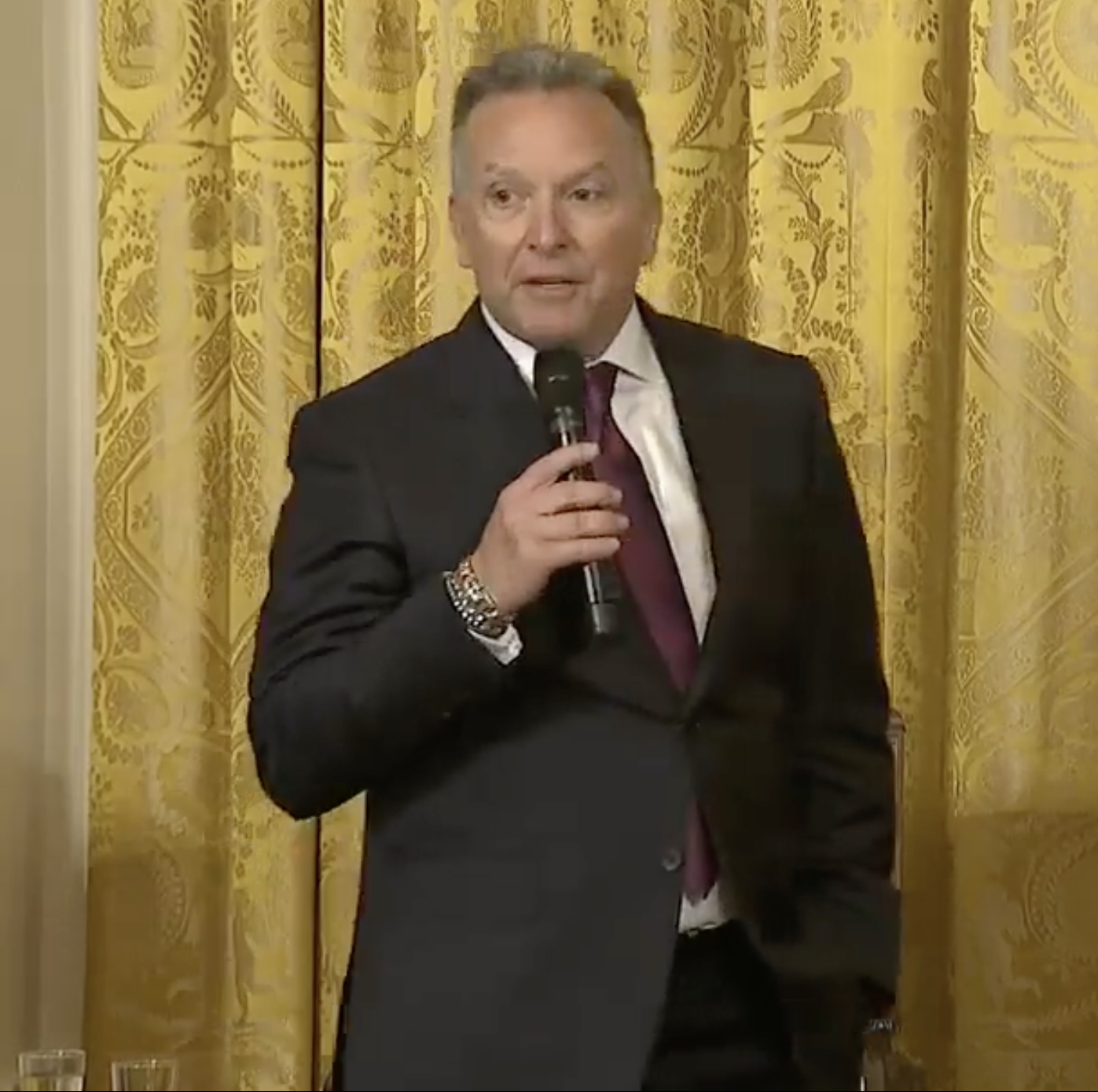
Steve Witkoff

- Linda Cahn ('79), founder and president of Pharmacy Benefit Consultants
- David D'Amato, subject of the documentary, Tickled
- Joey Jackson ('95), principal and founder of JOEY JACKSON LAW, PLLC., and legal analyst for CNN
- Norm Kent ('71), chairman of the National Organization for the Reform of Marijuana Laws NORML
- Charles Kushner ('79), billionaire real estate developer, and father of Jared Kushner
- Katherine Lapp ('81), executive vice president and chief administrative officer of Harvard University
- Randy Levine ('80), president of the New York Yankees since January 2000
- Mary Matalin, political consultant for the Republican Party, advisor to former president George W. Bush (attended but did not graduate)
- Bobby Muller ('74), peace advocate
- Burton Rocks ('97), sports agent
- Robert Rosenthal ('74), businessman and wealth management professional
- Joel Segal ('89), sports agent
- Steve Witkoff ('83), attorney, real estate investor and developer, philanthropist, and founder of the Witkoff Group; Special Envoy to the Middle East for U.S. President Donald Trump
