= 1998–99 NBA lockout =

Third lockout in the history of the National Basketball Association (NBA)

- Date: July 1, 1998 – January 20, 1999 (6 months, 2 weeks and 5 days)
- Location: United States; Canada
- Caused by: Owners agreed to reopen the 1995 NBA Collective Bargaining Agreement in March 1998; Stalemate over division of the NBA's basketball-related income and salary cap structure between NBA team owners and players
- Goals: Owners proposed a reduction of players' salaries, as well as a modified pay scale; Players proposed an increase in the minimum salary
- Result: Agreement reached to end lockout on January 6, 1999: New six-year collective bargaining agreement ratified on January 20; players' salaries reduced from 57% to a maximum of 55% of the league's income; 1998–99 season reduced to 50 games per team; season began on February 5

Parties
| National Basketball Players Association (NBPA) | National Basketball Association (NBA) |

Lead figures
| Billy Hunter (executive director); Patrick Ewing (president) | David Stern (commissioner) |

The 1998–99 NBA lockout was the third lockout of four in the history of the National Basketball Association (NBA). It lasted from July 1, 1998, to January 20, 1999, and forced the 1998–99 regular season to be shortened to 50 games per team and that season's Christmas games and the All-Star Game to be canceled. NBA owners reopened the league's collective bargaining agreement (CBA) in March 1998, seeking changes to the league's salary cap system and a ceiling on individual player salaries. The National Basketball Players Association (NBPA) opposed the owners' plans and wanted raises for players who earned the league's minimum salary. After the two sides failed to reach an agreement, the owners began the lockout.

The dispute received a tepid response from sports fans and provoked criticism from media members. It continued into January 1999, threatening the cancellation of the entire season. After division within the players union, however, NBPA executive director Billy Hunter reached an agreement with NBA commissioner David Stern on January 6 to end the work stoppage. Quickly ratified by the owners and players, the deal was signed later in January, ending the lockout after 204 days. The settlement provided for maximum salaries for players and a pay scale for first-year players. In the months after the lockout, television ratings and ticket sales declined during the 50-game season, and both remained below pre-lockout levels in subsequent seasons.

== Background ==
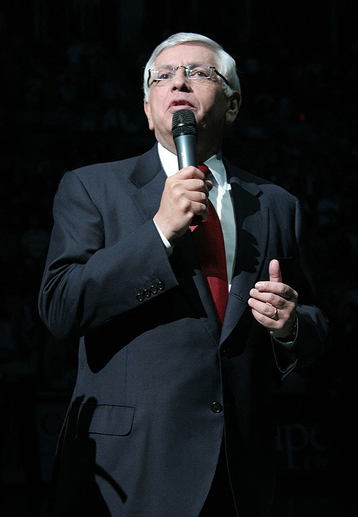
David Stern was the commissioner of the NBA during the 1998–99 lockout

Before 1998, there had been two lockouts in the previous three years: a labor dispute that lasted more than two months in 1995 and a brief work stoppage in 1996 that ended within three hours. However, on both occasions, the players and owners reached a deal before the start of the season, and before 1998, the NBA was the only major sports league in the United States that had never lost a game because of a work stoppage. A six-year CBA had been in place since September 1995, but it included a clause allowing NBA owners to reopen the contract after three years if more than 51.8% of "basketball-related income" went to player salaries.

By the 1997–98 season, 57% of basketball-related income was used to pay players, while the previous deal called for a 48% split. According to the NBA, 15 of the 29 teams posted losses that season. The NBPA disputed this figure and claimed that only four teams had losses. The league's owners voted on whether to reopen the CBA on March 23, 1998, and the vote passed by a 27–2 margin. Negotiations between the NBPA and owners started on April 1, and nine further bargaining sessions took place in the next three months.

The primary issue was that of player salaries, which owners sought to curb. A salary cap had been a part of the CBA since 1983, but it included loopholes that allowed teams to exceed the payroll limit. Among them was the "Larry Bird exception", named after the former player who was an early beneficiary of the rule. The Bird exception enabled teams to spend an unlimited amount of money to re-sign their own players, causing a substantial increase in the value of upper-end contracts. Club owners wanted to remove the exemption and place limits on maximum player salaries.

Owners also sought to prevent large contracts for young players similar to the $126 million, six-year deal that Kevin Garnett had recently signed with the Minnesota Timberwolves. They desired a modified pay scale for rookie players that would prevent them from gaining unrestricted free agency after three seasons, and wanted to ban the use of marijuana and performance-enhancing drugs. The players union, wanting to avoid a decline in salaries, opposed changes to the salary cap system, in particular those involving the Larry Bird exception. Other NBPA positions included opposition to a cap on individual player salaries and support for a raise of the minimum salary, which 22% of NBA players earned during 1997–98.

== Lockout ==
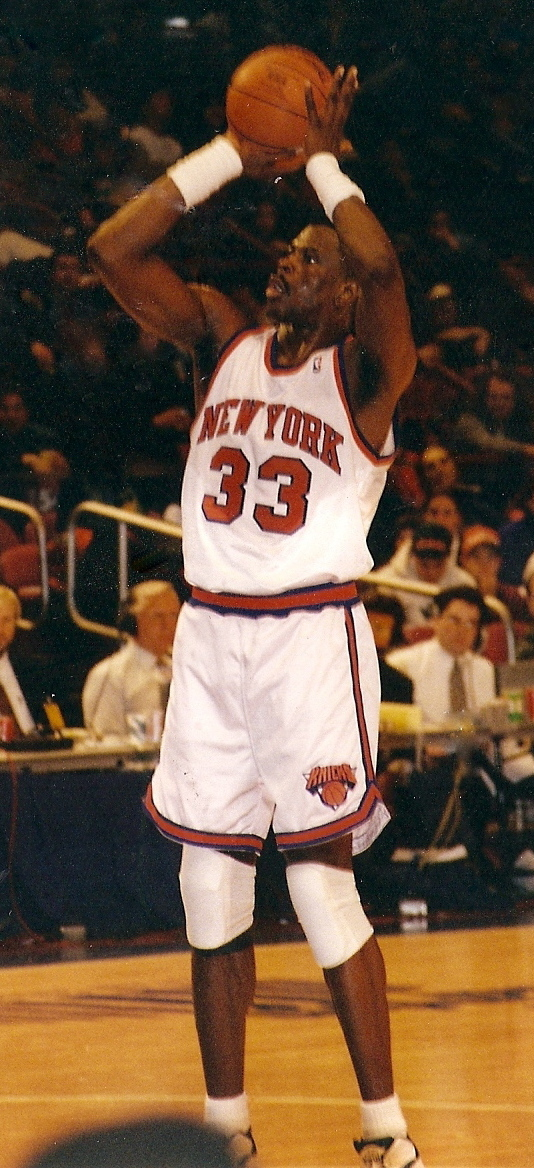
Patrick Ewing was the president of the NBPA during the lockout

After negotiations between the sides broke off on June 22, the lockout started nine days later. Teams were barred from making player transactions and holding workouts and meetings for the duration of the work stoppage. The Hofstra Labor and Employment Law Journal's Grant M. Hayden described the NBA's action as an "offensive lockout", in which an employer attempts to force its workers into a settlement that does not favor them. An early byproduct of the lockout was the exclusion of NBA players from the United States national team that played at the 1998 FIBA World Championship. USA Basketball, the governing body for the sport in the U.S., elected to send a team consisting of lower-level professional players and amateurs. Negotiations resumed at an August 6 bargaining session, the first since the start of the lockout. NBA commissioner David Stern and several owners left the talks after the NBPA presented an offer that included increased revenue sharing between teams.

By September 25, 24 exhibition games were canceled and training camps were postponed indefinitely as a result of stalled talks. Further negotiating sessions took place in October and November, but no agreement was reached. The season's first two weeks were officially canceled on October 13, and 99 games scheduled for November were lost as a result. It was the first time in NBA history that games were canceled due to a labor dispute. On October 20, arbitrator John Feerick ruled that the owners did not have to pay players with guaranteed contracts during the lockout. Feerick's decision gave the owners leverage in bargaining talks. Another factor favoring the owners was that their teams received money from the NBA's television broadcasters, whose contracts with the league called for payments to be made if games were not played.

Further games were canceled as the lockout continued through November and December, including the league's Christmas games (which had been played on an annual basis since 1947) and the 1999 All-Star Game (which had been scheduled to be played on February 14, 1999, at the First Union Center in Philadelphia). As a result of the All-Star Game's cancellation, the NBA later awarded the 2002 All-Star Game to Philadelphia. Discussions during the lockout were characterized by frequent hostility between the players and owners. One example of the heated nature of the talks came at an early December bargaining session, when Stern and NBPA executive director Billy Hunter became involved in what CBS News called "an extremely heated, expletive-laden screaming match". Both men temporarily walked away from the bargaining table, and indicated after the session that the entire season might be canceled. Although the 1998 portion of the schedule was not played because of the lockout, 16 NBA players participated in a December 19 exhibition game in Atlantic City, New Jersey. The event's organizers intended to give NBPA members a share of the money raised, but the idea proved controversial, and charities ultimately received the proceeds.

=== Settlement ===
On December 23, Stern announced that he would recommend canceling the season if there was no deal by January 7, 1999. At a December 27 meeting, a "final" deal was proposed by the owners. The sides met again on January 4, and the NBPA gave its last proposal to the owners, who turned it down. Stern discussed the possibility of having replacement players brought in to begin the following season. As Stern's deadline approached, the NBPA showed signs of division from within. Highly paid players were seen as the ones most affected by the disputed issues, rather than the union's membership as a whole. Agent David Falk, who was considered an influential voice for the players, represented NBPA president Patrick Ewing and nine players on the union's 19-person negotiating committee.

The NBPA scheduled a meeting on January 6 in New York City, where players would vote on the proposal by the owners, which the committee had recommended opposing. Several players, including Shaquille O'Neal and Hakeem Olajuwon, wanted the vote to be conducted by secret ballot, while others indicated a desire to return to competition regardless of how the vote went. Kevin Johnson stated that most players "were just ready to [fight] Wednesday at our meeting if an agreement hadn't been reached." Faced with a splintering union, Hunter moved to resume talks with Stern. On January 6, the day before Stern's deadline, he and Hunter reached an agreement, which was ratified by the NBPA later that day and by the NBA Board of Governors on January 7.

Widely viewed as a victory for Stern and the owners, the agreement was signed by both parties on January 20, officially ending the lockout after 204 days. It capped players' salaries at between $9 million and $14 million, depending on how long they had played in the NBA. The league became the first major sports organization in the U.S. to limit the salaries of its players. A rookie pay scale was introduced, with salary increases tied to how early a player was selected in the NBA draft. The Larry Bird exception was retained, though maximum annual pay raises were capped. New "average" and "median" salary cap exemptions, which the NBPA had proposed, allowed teams to sign one player per category even if they were over the spending limit. For teams that wished to exceed the salary cap, a luxury tax was instituted requiring offenders to pay on a dollar-for-dollar basis, provided total league salaries were above a specified level. The league's minimum salary was increased to $287,500, a $15,000 raise from before the lockout. The players were promised that their salaries would equal 55% of league revenues over the agreement's final three seasons. However, any higher percentage would lead to a salary decrease. The NBA's drug policy was expanded to cover performance-enhancing drugs and marijuana, with once-yearly testing.

== Reaction and aftermath ==
The lockout prompted indifference among most American sports fans, who thought that greed was shown by both sides, a similar sentiment to what fans voiced during the 1994–95 Major League Baseball strike. A CBS News–New York Times poll conducted in October 1998 showed that, while most fans' opinion of professional basketball was unaffected by the work stoppage, 29% reported that their views had become more negative. The same poll showed that fans backed the NBPA in the dispute by a 36–29 margin, while the general public supported the owners 24% to 22%. One-quarter of basketball fans who responded to the poll stated that they did not know enough about the lockout to give an opinion, along with 45% of the general public. Media members were frequently critical of the owners and players. Sportswriter Tony Kornheiser described the labor dispute as one "between tall millionaires and short millionaires." An article in Newsweek termed the lockout "an incomprehensible and unconscionable dispute between rival gangs of millionaires". Time's Bill Saporito believed that each side was damaged by the lockout, in terms of financial losses and negative publicity. Stern said that he had made concessions in the agreement, while Hunter said that the parties "both blinked."

From a broader labor perspective, Hayden commented that the lockout was "rather pedestrian" and "made no noteworthy contributions to legal doctrine." He considered the NBPA to be a union that had more power, and a greater ability to enter a labor dispute, than most other labor organizations, which he believed to hold weaker positions comparatively. In addition, Hayden noted that a contrast existed between the work activities of regular workers and NBA players, as perceived by typical employees, and that "the NBA lockout may have strengthened the view of many that unions are out of touch with their lives and thus have little to offer them."

The 1998–99 season, which began on February 5, 1999, was shortened to 50 games per team, as opposed to the normal 82. As a result of the 204-day lockout, 464 regular-season games were lost. In addition to the lockout, the NBA's popularity was affected by the second retirement of Michael Jordan, who had been largely responsible for an increase in fan interest during his career. The average attendance during the shortened season was 16,738 fans per game, down 2.2% from the 1997–98 average of 17,117 spectators per contest. Ticket sales fell nearly 2% further in the opening months of the 1999–2000 season, and remained under 17,000 per game for the following three seasons. The league also saw television ratings drop for three consecutive seasons after the lockout. On the court, players struggled to condition themselves for the season on short notice, leading to subpar play around the NBA. Scoring declined by about four points per game per team on average, to the lowest total in 20 years. Turnovers increased, field goal percentages decreased, and teams typically played at a reduced pace.

In the years following the lockout, a higher percentage of players signed contracts worth the maximum amount possible under the cap. Some young players, such as LeBron James, began signing shorter contracts that allowed for more flexibility in team choice and salary. The agreement expired in 2005, and both sides became concerned about the possibility of another work stoppage, at a time when the National Hockey League had recently lost its 2004–05 season to labor issues. A lockout was prevented, however, when a six-year CBA was reached in June 2005. After the expiration of that CBA, a lockout occurred in 2011; it was the fourth in league history and lasted for about five months before the sides came to an agreement. Each team's schedule in the 2011–12 NBA season was cut by 16 games.
