= Schoelen =

Schoelen is a surname. Notable people with the surname include:

- Jill Schoelen (born 1963), American actress
- Mary J. Schoelen (born 1968), American judge

== See also ==
- Scholen
