= Julian Ku =

American legal scholar (born 1973)

Julian G. Ku
- 古舉倫
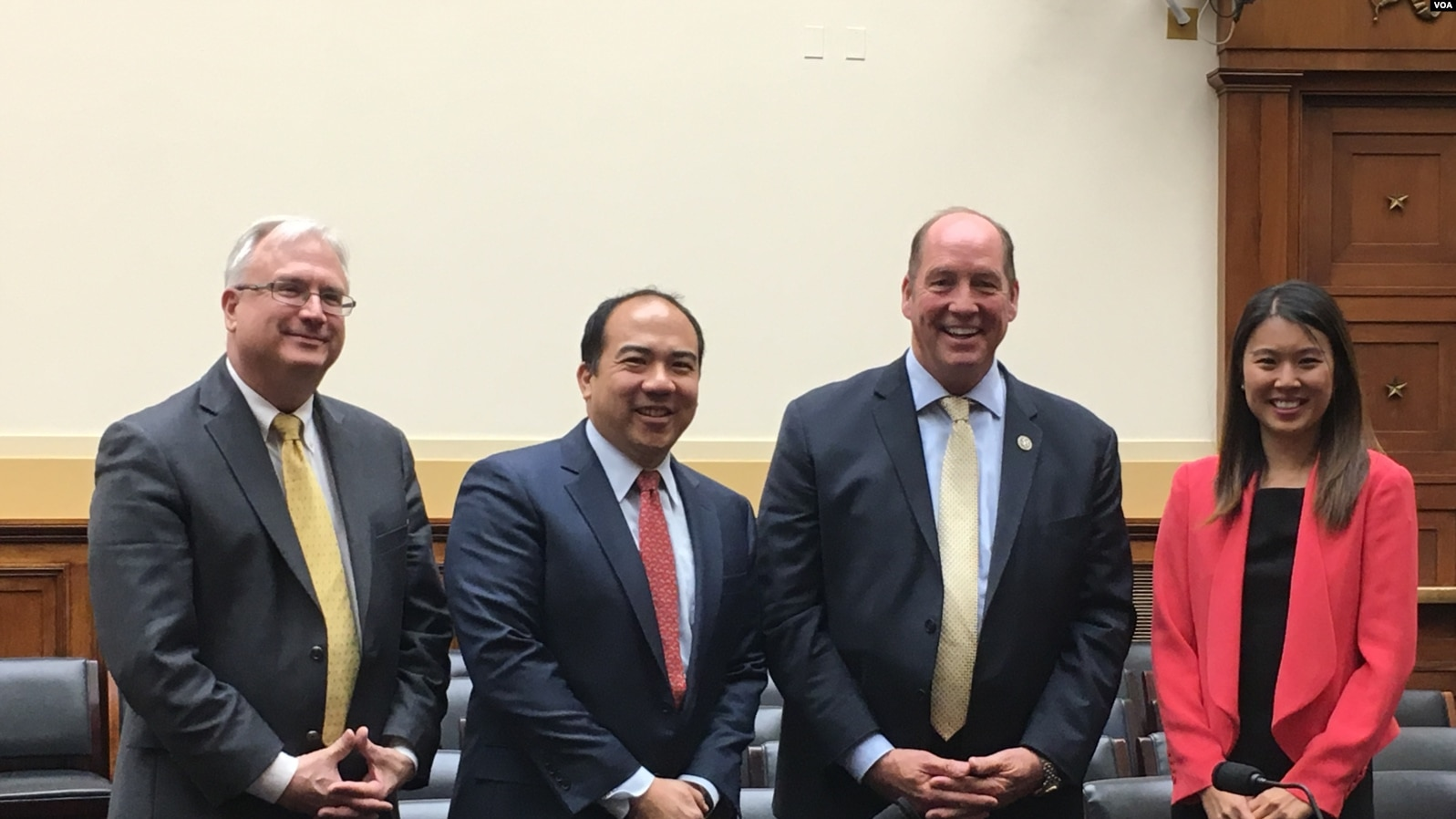
- Ku (second from left) in 2018
- Born: Gei-Lun Ku; 1973 (age 52–53); Baltimore, Maryland, U.S.
- Education: Yale University (BA, JD)
- Occupation: Law professor
- Political party: Republican

Julian Gei-Lun Ku (Chinese: 古舉倫; born 1973) is an American legal scholar.

== Biography ==
Born and raised in Baltimore, Maryland, Ku earned his bachelor degree from Yale College in 1994 and earned his Juris Doctor from Yale Law School in 1998. At Yale, Ku was a member of the Party of the Right. Ku clerked for Jerry Edwin Smith in the United States Court of Appeals for the Fifth Circuit and specialized in international arbitration and litigation with Debevoise & Plimpton before lecturing at the University of Virginia Law School.

Ku holds the Maurice A. Deane Distinguished Professorship of Constitutional Law at Hofstra University's Maurice A. Deane School of Law, having joined the school's faculty in 2002. He is also a co-founder of the Opinio Juris legal blog, and serves as one of Lawfare's contributing editors. He has also authored books and book chapters, and has collaborated with other scholars, including John Yoo, in co-authoring publications.

Ku is an elected member of the American Law Institute, and is a member of the Federalist Society.

In an academic capacity, Ku has commented on Taiwan–United States relations and cross-strait relations.

== Selected work ==
- Ku, Julian; — (2012). Taming Globalization: International Law, the U.S. Constitution, and the New World Order (co-author John Yoo). Oxford University Press. ISBN 978-0-19-983742-7. Archived from the original on January 31, 2021.

== See also ==
- Alafair Burke
- Monroe H. Freedman
