= A. Gail Prudenti =

U.S. jurist and academic administrator

10th dean of the Maurice A. Deane School of Law
- In office May 2017 – June 2023
- Preceded by: Eric Lane
- Succeeded by: Jenny Roberts

New York Chief Administrator of the Courts
- In office December 2011 – August 2015
- Preceded by: Ann Pfau
- Succeeded by: Lawrence K. Marks

Presiding justice of the New York State Supreme Court, Appellate Division, Second Department
- In office February 2002 – 2011
- Appointed by: George Pataki
- Succeeded by: William F. Mastro (acting)

Personal details
- Education: Marymount College, Tarrytown; University of Aberdeen School of Law

A. Gail Prudenti is an American jurist and academic administrator who served from 2017 to June 2023 as the 10th dean of the Maurice A. Deane School of Law. She was the New York Chief Administrator of the Courts from 2011 to 2015. Prudenti was the presiding justice of the New York State Supreme Court, Appellate Division, Second Department from 2002 to 2011.

== Life ==
A. Gail Prudenti was born to Annelise, a Suffolk County, New York, government official, and Anthony Prudenti, a jurist and local Republican party official. Anneliese was born in Lauingen, Bavaria and met Anthony in 1951 while he was a U.S. Army sergeant. Prudenti graduated with honors from Marymount College, Tarrytown. She earned a law degree from the University of Aberdeen School of Law.

Prudenti and her future husband, Robert Cimino, clerked for Suffolk surrogate judge Ernest L. Signorelli. She later worked for the Suffolk County assistant district attorney for two years. She worked in private practice for ten years. Prudenti served as special counsel for the New York Police and Fire Widows' and Children's Benefit Fund. In 1991, she was elected to the New York Supreme Court. Prudenti served until 1995. Prudenti was the Suffolk surrogate judge. She was the first female elected to this role. In 1996, she concurrently served as an acting New York Supreme Court justice. In February 1999, she was appointed by chief administrative judge Jonathan Lippman to become the first person to dually serve as the Tenth Judicial District, Suffolk County administrative judge. Prudenti was the first New York surrogate to serve as a district administrative judge.

Prudenti was an associate justice on the New York State Supreme Court, Appellate Division, Second Department. In February 2002, Prudenti was named by New York governor George Pataki as the presiding justice of the Appellate Division, Second Department. She was the first woman in the position. In August 2011, Prudenti was the designate judge on the New York Court of Appeals. On December 1, 2011, Prudenti succeeded jurist Ann Pfau as the New York Chief Administrator of the Courts. She served in the role until 2015.

On September 1, 2015, Prudenti joined the Maurice A. Deane School of Law as the executive director of its center for children, families, and the law and senior associate dean of operations. On January 1, 2017, she became the interim dean, succeeding Eric Lane. She became the 10th dean in May 2017. In January 2023, Prudenti announced she would step down on June 30.

== See also ==
- List of first women lawyers and judges in New York
