= Joel Segal =

American sports agent

- Education: George Washington University, Hofstra Law School
- Occupation: Sports agent
- Years active: 27

Joel Segal is an American sports agent and Managing Partner at WIN Sports Group. He was formerly Managing Director of Team Sports at WME and President Americas of SPORTFIVE. He graduated Magna Cum Laude from George Washington University, where he was inducted into the George Washington University Sports Executives Hall of Fame. Segal graduated from Hofstra Law School and is a member of the Hofstra Law School Hall of Fame.

Segal has been named to USA Today's "The NFL's 100 Most Important People" list, Forbes "World's Most Powerful Sports Agents" list, and named one of the "Most Powerful Sports Agents" by Sports Business Journal.

== Career ==
Segal has negotiated NFL contracts for a list of players, including deals for Khalil Mack of the Chicago Bears and Christian McCaffrey of the San Francisco 49ers, while representing multiple first-round draft picks for 14 consecutive years.

With over 25 years of experience representing NFL players, Segal has built one of the largest practices in the league. His list of clients includes many first-round draft picks, pro bowlers, and other notable players.
