= Opinio Juris (blog) =

International law magazine (2005-)

- Website type: Blog
- Owner: Independent (partnership with the International Commission of Jurists)
- Editors: Kevin Jon Heller, Julian Ku, Alonso Gurmendi Dunkelberg, Priya Pillai, Angela Mudukuti, Mohsen al Attar.
- Website: opiniojuris.org
- Commercial: No
- Launched: 2005
- Current status: Active
- ISSN: 2326-0386
- OCLC number: 435681071

Opinio Juris is a blog dedicated to the informed discussion of international law by and among academics, practitioners and legal experts, published independently in cooperation with the International Commission of Jurists. It is one of the leading international law blogs.

== Background ==
The blog was started in 2005 by Chris Borgen (St. John’s University); Peggy McGuinness (St. John’s University); and Julian Ku (Hofstra). Kevin Jon Heller (University of Copenhagen) joined in 2006.

In 2007, State Department Legal Adviser John Bellinger became a guest blogger for a week. This marked the first time that a US government official blogged in an official capacity on international law.

Notable contributors to the blog have included British-French lawyer, academic, and author Philippe Sands, American lawyer and U.S. official Harold Hongju Koh, and Diego García-Sayán, UN Special Rapporteur on the independence of judges and lawyers.

== Reception ==
The blog is consistently cited in journal articles and research outputs. Opinio Juris blog posts are often cited in reports by Human Rights Watch and other news media.
