= 1997 Washington Initiative 676 =

1997 Washington state ballot measure

1997 Initiative Measure No. 676
- November 4, 1997
- Concerns firearms

Results
Choice	Votes	%
Yes	496,690	29.38%
No	1,194,004	70.62%
No
90–100%
80–90%
70–80%
60–70%
50–60%
- Source: November 1997 General Election Results, Washington State Secretary of State, archived from the original on 25 October 2014

Initiative 676 was an unsuccessful Washington state ballot initiative concerning firearms regulation that appeared on the ballot for the November 1997 elections.

The initiative was filed on February 3, 1997, by Thomas C. Wales of Seattle, who later became a victim of gun violence himself. 239,805 signatures were collected to qualify it for the ballot.

== Ballot title ==
The ballot title was as follows:

Shall the transfer of handguns without trigger-locking devices be prohibited and persons possessing or acquiring a handgun be required to obtain a handgun safety license?

== Support ==
Many physicians and medical associations expressed support, claiming it would decrease gun accidents especially in children. William H. Gates, the father of Microsoft Chairman Bill Gates, donated $150,000 towards the passage of Initiative 676. Bill and Melinda Gates earlier contributed $35,000 to the cause. The Washington Citizens for Handgun Safety raised $575,658 by September 1997.

== Opposition ==
Snohomish County Sheriff Rick Bart was opposed, voicing concerns about the strain the passage of the initiative could put on law enforcement, and excessive punishments for violations.

Ameripac, a federal-level political action committee, contributed $100,000 to opposing Initiative 676. Gun rights organizations, including the National Rifle Association of America, contributed more than $2.3 million in opposition to the measure.

== Results ==
Despite polling indicating voters almost exactly split, the initiative overwhelmingly failed to pass, and was rejected in every single county. The highest percentage voting yes was San Juan County at 45.1%.

1997 Washington Initiative 676
Choice	Votes	%
For	496,690	29.38
Against	1,194,004	70.62
Total	1,690,694	100.00
Source: Washington Secretary of State

=== By county ===
County results
County	No		Yes		Margin		Total votes
County	#	%	#	%	#	%	Total votes
Adams	3,297	87.08%	489	12.92%	2,808	74.17%	3,786
Asotin	4,357	85.82%	720	14.18%	3,637	71.64%	5,077
Benton	34,728	85.84%	5,727	14.16%	29,001	71.69%	40,455
Chelan	17,076	84.27%	3,188	15.73%	13,888	68.54%	20,264
Clallam	18,596	77.65%	5,351	22.35%	13,245	55.31%	23,947
Clark	50,890	65.83%	26,414	34.17%	24,476	31.66%	77,304
Columbia	1,670	93.66%	113	6.34%	1,557	87.32%	1,783
Cowlitz	20,046	76.51%	6,155	23.49%	13,891	53.02%	26,201
Douglas	8,432	88.22%	1,126	11.78%	7,306	76.44%	9,558
Ferry	2,432	91.19%	235	8.81%	2,197	82.38%	2,667
Franklin	8,183	86.74%	1,251	13.26%	6,932	73.48%	9,434
Garfield	1,059	92.41%	87	7.59%	972	84.82%	1,146
Grant	15,638	89.67%	1,801	10.33%	13,837	79.35%	17,439
Grays Harbor	17,771	84.00%	3,384	16.00%	14,387	68.01%	21,155
Island	15,475	72.71%	5,809	27.29%	9,666	45.41%	21,284
Jefferson	7,470	67.51%	3,595	32.49%	3,875	35.02%	11,065
King	297,454	56.70%	227,147	43.30%	70,307	13.40%	524,601
Kitsap	52,276	71.40%	20,942	28.60%	31,334	42.80%	73,218
Kittitas	8,383	83.93%	1,605	16.07%	6,778	67.86%	9,988
Klickitat	4,560	81.75%	1,018	18.25%	3,542	63.50%	5,578
Lewis	19,859	88.89%	2,483	11.11%	17,376	77.77%	22,342
Lincoln	4,180	91.27%	400	8.73%	3,780	61.02%	82.53
Mason	13,946	82.48%	2,963	17.52%	10,983	64.95%	16,909
Okanogan	10,208	89.86%	1,152	10.14%	9,056	79.72%	11,360
Pacific	5,645	77.80%	1,611	22.20%	4,034	55.60%	7,256
Pend Oreille	4,043	92.16%	344	7.84%	3,699	84.32%	4,387
Pierce	130,124	73.42%	47,106	26.58%	83,018	46.84%	177,230
San Juan	3,084	54.87%	2,537	45.13%	547	9.73%	5,621
Skagit	25,659	79.39%	6,663	20.61%	18,996	58.77%	32,322
Skamania	2,303	79.44%	596	20.56%	1,707	58.88%	2,899
Snohomish	116,146	71.69%	45,874	28.31%	70,272	43.37%	162,020
Spokane	103,815	83.16%	21,030	16.84%	82,785	66.31%	124,845
Stevens	13,563	93.08%	1,009	6.92%	12,554	86.15%	14,572
Thurston	49,319	70.90%	20,240	29.10%	29,079	41.80%	69,559
Wahkiakum	1,251	78.48%	343	21.52%	908	56.96%	1,594
Walla Walla	12,679	84.02%	2,412	15.98%	10,267	68.03%	15,091
Whatcom	34,839	70.83%	14,351	29.17%	20,488	41.65%	49,190
Whitman	8,737	78.03%	2,460	21.97%	6,277	56.06%	11,197
Yakima	44,811	86.56%	6,959	13.44%	37,852	73.12%	51,770
Totals	1,194,004	70.62%	496,690	29.38%	697,314	41.24%	1,690,694
