= Jonathan Luna =

American lawyer, unsolved death

- Born: Jonathan Paul Luna; October 21, 1965; New York, New York, U.S.
- Died: December 4, 2003 (aged 38); Lancaster County, Pennsylvania, U.S.
- Cause of death: Drowning following stab wounds
- Education: Fordham University; University of North Carolina School of Law
- Occupation: Attorney
- Known for: Unresolved circumstances surrounding death
- Spouse: Angela Hopkins (m. 1993)
- Children: 2

Jonathan Paul Luna (October 21, 1965 – December 4, 2003) was an Assistant United States Attorney in Baltimore, Maryland, who was found dead under mysterious circumstances. Luna had been stabbed thirty-six times with his own pocketknife before he drowned in a creek next to his partially submerged car in rural Lancaster County, Pennsylvania. Investigations have proven inconclusive, and there is debate on whether Luna's death was murder or suicide.

== Personal life ==
Jonathan Luna was born on October 21, 1965, and grew up in the Patterson houses near Yankee Stadium in the South Bronx, New York City. His father was Filipino and his mother an African-American from the American South. Luna received his undergraduate degree from Fordham University. He later studied at the University of North Carolina School of Law, where he was roommates with Reggie Shuford. He worked at Arnold & Porter in Washington, D.C. from 1993 to 1994 and the Federal Trade Commission from 1994 to 1997. Luna served as a prosecutor in the Brooklyn borough of New York City before moving to Baltimore to become an Assistant United States Attorney.

Luna married Angela Hopkins, an obstetrician, on August 29, 1993, and they had two children.

== Death ==
Luna's body was found in Denver PA near 1439 Dry Tavern Road.

On the night of December 3, 2003, at 11:38 p.m. Luna left the Baltimore courthouse and drove northeast on Interstate 95. He used his E-ZPass to cross into Delaware but not on the New Jersey and Pennsylvania Turnpikes. After three toll interchanges, Luna switched to buying toll tickets.

At 12:57 a.m., $200 was withdrawn from Luna's bank account from the ATM at the JFK Plaza service center near Newark, Delaware. At 2:47 a.m. he crossed the Delaware River toll bridge to the Pennsylvania Turnpike, and at 3:20 a.m. his debit card was used to buy gas at the Sunoco King of Prussia service plaza.

At 4:04 a.m. Luna's car exited the turnpike at the Reading-Lancaster interchange. The toll ticket had a spot of his blood on it, suggesting that he was already injured. The car was parked at the back of the Sensenig & Weaver Well Drilling company at 1439 Dry Tavern Road, Denver, Pennsylvania (Brecknock Township), before it was later driven into the creek.

At 5:00 a.m., the first employee of Sensenig & Weaver arrived for work. Half an hour later, at 5:30 a.m. Luna's car was noticed, with its lights off and the front end into the creek. Blood was smeared over the driver's door and the front left of the car. Luna was face down in the creek under the car engine, wearing a suit and a black overcoat with his court ID around his neck. A pool of blood was found on the rear seat floor. Although stabbed thirty-six times with his own pocketknife around the chest and neck plus a head injury, Luna's cause of death was determined to be drowning.

No suspects or motive for Luna's murder were determined. The Federal Bureau of Investigation (FBI) leaned toward considering the death a suicide and came to the conclusion he was alone from the time he left his office until his body was found, but Lancaster County authorities, including two successive coroners, ruled it a homicide. Additional evidence collected during the investigation captured a second blood type and a partial print, as well as some grainy footage from near the time of the gas station purchase made with Luna's credit card at the King of Prussia service plaza. The investigation remains ongoing, and there is an unclaimed federal reward of $100,000 for information leading to a conviction.

== Theories ==
=== Suicide ===
It was initially reported that Luna did not have the expected substantial defensive wounds on his hands and that many of the wounds are shallow, which are called "hesitation" wounds in a suicide victim. Some suggested motives for suicide were that Luna was to take a polygraph test concerning $36,000 which disappeared from a robbery case that he had prosecuted. Luna had a charge card which his wife did not know about. His name was on an Internet dating site and he had a $25,000 credit card debt. There is also an accidental suicide theory that Luna was fabricating a kidnapping and went too far in the attempt.

=== Homicide ===
The Lancaster County coroner who performed Luna's autopsy ruled his death a homicide by drowning. Luna left his glasses, which he needed to drive, and his cell phone on his desk in Baltimore. He had called defense attorneys earlier in the night saying he would fax over documents that never arrived. The pool of blood in the backseat of the car would suggest Luna was in the back while someone else was driving.

== Subsequent events ==
In early February 2007, a private investigator and an attorney, both hired by Luna's family, filed a petition for a writ of mandamus in order to force the Lancaster County coroner to conduct an inquest into Luna's death, after an earlier request was declined.

In February 2020, the Lancaster County newspaper LNP requested that a judge unseal coroner's records pertaining to Luna's death that were found to be in possession of the county, instead of federal prosecutors, as had been previously thought. On January 13, 2021, Judge David Ashworth ruled that the documents would remain sealed, writing that releasing the records would pose "a threat of substantially hindering or jeopardizing the open, active and ongoing criminal investigation into the death of Jonathan Luna."

== See also ==
- Casefile True Crime Podcast - Case 9
- List of unsolved deaths
- Thomas C. Wales
- Ray Gricar
- Death of Ellen Greenberg
