= Scott J. Laurer =

American judge (born 1965)

Scott Laurer
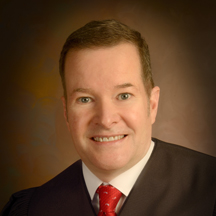

Judge of the United States Court of Appeals for Veterans Claims
- Incumbent
- Assumed office August 2020
- Appointed by: Donald Trump
- Preceded by: Mary J. Schoelen

Personal details
- Born: Scott Joseph Laurer; 1965 (age 60–61)
- Education: Rutgers University, New Brunswick (BA); Temple University (JD); George Washington University (LLM)

Military service
- Allegiance: United States
- Branch/service: United States Navy
- Years of service: 1990–2019
- Rank: Captain
- Unit: United States Navy Judge Advocate General's Corps; Naval Special Warfare Group 1; USS Blue Ridge; USS Abraham Lincoln; United States National Security Council
- Commands: Navy Region Legal Service Office for Europe, Africa, and Southwest Asia
- Battles/wars: Operation Iraqi Freedom; Operation Enduring Freedom; Operation Southern Watch
- Awards: Defense Superior Service Medal; Legion of Merit; Defense Meritorious Service Medal

Scott Joseph Laurer (born 1965) is a retired United States Navy Captain and American lawyer who serves as a judge of the United States Court of Appeals for Veterans Claims.

== Early life ==
Born as the third of seven children, Scott Laurer grew up in the historical town of Woodbury, N.J. His father served in the Navy during the Korean War era, and his uncle served in the Army in Vietnam. His maternal grandfather worked as a claims investigator for the Yellow Cab company in Philadelphia. He worked with attorneys and talked about his work with the family, sparking Laurer's interest in the field. When he completed a survey in high school to identify his career interests, the top profession recommended for him was an attorney.

== Education ==
As a college student at Rutgers University-New Brunswick, Laurer majored in political science. He spoke to a Navy recruiter, asking if it would be possible to attend law school part time while serving in the Navy. The recruiter advised that in the Navy, it was unlikely that he would be stationed in one location long enough to complete a Juris Doctor degree. Judge Laurer’s first goal was to become a lawyer, so he first pursued law school instead.

While at Temple University School of Law, he learned for the first time that a person could be an attorney in the Navy. One day, he saw people in military uniforms in the student lounge, who he later learned were judge advocates. In an era before the internet, even the Navy recruiter he spoke to knew little about the Navy Judge Advocate General’s Corps.

Later, Laurer earned his Bachelor of Arts from Rutgers University and his Juris Doctor from the Temple University Beasley School of Law.

== Military service and legal career ==
Laurer served in the United States Navy as Special Counsel to the Chief of Naval Operations and as a Commanding Officer in the United States Region Legal Service Office for Europe, Africa, and Southwest Asia. Before becoming a judge, he was Deputy Legal Advisor at the National Security Council.

== Federal judicial service ==
On August 28, 2019, President Trump announced his intent to nominate Laurer to serve as a judge of the United States Court of Appeals for Veterans Claims. On September 19, 2019, his nomination was sent to the Senate. President Trump nominated Laurer to the seat vacated by Judge Mary J. Schoelen, whose term subsequently expired on December 20, 2019. On November 6, 2019, a hearing on his nomination was held before the Committee on Veterans' Affairs. Two days later, Captain Laurer retired from the U.S. Navy after serving nearly 30 years on active duty with the U.S. Navy JAG Corps. On January 3, 2020, his nomination was returned to the President under Rule XXXI, Paragraph 6 of the United States Senate. On January 9, 2020, he was renominated to the same seat. On July 23, 2020, the Senate confirmed his nomination by a voice vote. He received his judicial commission in August 2020.

Legal offices
Preceded by Mary J. Schoelen	Judge of the United States Court of Appeals for Veterans Claims; 2020–present	Incumbent
