= Joey Jackson (attorney) =

American lawyer

Joey Jackson is an American criminal defense attorney, commentator, and former prosecutor. He worked as a prosecutor in the Manhattan District Attorney's office before becoming a defense lawyer, and is a legal analyst who has contributed to CNN and other local and national media outlets.

== Education ==
Jackson received a BA from SUNY Brockport, an MPA from University at Albany’s Nelson A. Rockefeller College of Public Affairs & Policy in 1992, and later a JD from Maurice A. Deane School of Law at Hofstra University before being admitted to the New York State Bar Association (NYSBA). As a law student, Jackson served as editor for the Hofstra Labor and Employment Law Journal.

== Early career ==
As a graduate and professional student, Jackson held internships with the New York State Education Department (NYSED) and New York Democratic congressman Charles Rangel’s office in Washington, D.C. While pursuing his master's degree, Jackson served as a legislative analyst for the New York State Assembly speaker. Jackson is a former adjunct professor at Monroe College (Bronx, New York City).

== Career ==
=== District attorney ===
Under Robert Morgenthau, Jackson was appointed assistant district attorney in the New York County District Attorney's Office, which covered the borough of Manhattan from 1995 to 1998.

=== Defense attorney ===
As a defense attorney, Jackson has handled cases in areas of criminal defense, labor and employment, and civil service law.

=== Media personality ===
Jackson joined CNN and HLN in 2013, but has also recently appeared on Fox News, Fox Business Channel, Court TV, In Session, ABC, NBC, and MSNBC.

== High-profile cases ==
- Jackson represented Lavar Thomas, the Sing Sing Correctional Facility guard acquitted of criminal assault on an inmate at the New York State Department of Corrections and Community Supervision facility, amid a campaign to crack down on brutality of inmates.
- Jackson represented Juan Rodriguez, a man charged in a hot car case in which his two infant twins perished.
