= Linda Cahn =

Linda Cahn is the founder and president of a nationwide consulting firm, Pharmacy Benefit Consultants. The firm assists corporations, unions, government entities and insurance companies in improving their prescription coverage benefits and decreasing their prescription coverage costs.

Cahn's expertise related to prescription coverage arises from lawsuits she filed on behalf of clients against pharmacy benefit management companies (PBMs). In 1997, she initiated the first class action litigation against the two largest PBMs at that time—predecessor entities to Medco Health Solutions and CVS Caremark. As a result of that litigation and several subsequent lawsuits, she gained access to hundreds of thousands of confidential PBM documents.

Cahn has testified before state legislative hearings about proposed legislation to alter PBMs’ practices and improve the prescription coverage marketplace. She has also conducted numerous meetings about PBMs with federal and state prosecutors, officials at the Government Accounting Office and the United States Labor Department, and on Capitol Hill.

She is a graduate of Princeton University and Hofstra Law School, both with honors.

== Publications ==
Cahn is the author of several published articles about PBMs and the prescription coverage industry, and is frequently quoted in publications as an industry expert.

=== Articles written by Cahn ===
- Cahn, Linda (November 2010). "Don't Pay Too Much For Generic Fills". Managed Care.
- Cahn, Linda (November 2010). "Specialty Drugs: So Special It's Time To Control Their Costs" (PDF). Benefits & Compensation Digest.
- Cahn, Linda (September 2010). "When Is A Brand A Generic? In A Contract With A PBM" (PDF). Managed Care. PMID 20931886.
- Cahn, Linda (February 2009). "PBMs' MAC Mousetraps". Benefits Compensation Digest. Archived from the original on 2011-04-30.
- Cahn, Linda (January 2009). "Don't Get Trapped By PBMs' Rebate Labeling Games". Managed Care. 18 (1): 31–33. PMID 19186668.
- Cahn, Linda (September 2008). "Don't Get Caught By PBMs' MAC Mousetraps" (PDF). Managed Care. 17 (9): 30–2, 34. PMID 18839709. Archived from the original (PDF) on 2011-07-11.
- Cahn, Linda (July 2008). "How to Pare Health Plan Rx Costs". Financial Executive.
- Cahn, Linda (April 2008). "How To Dramatically Decrease Your MCO's Rx Coverage Costs". Managed Care. 17 (4): 31–35. PMID 18464571.
- Cahn, Linda (October 2007). "How To Conduct A Successful PBM RFP". Benefits Compensation Digest. Archived from the original on 2011-04-30.
- Cahn, Linda (June 2006). "How To Navigate An Airtight PBM Contract". Benefits Compensation Digest. Archived from the original on 2011-04-30.

=== Articles quoting Cahn ===
- "Industry Faces Looming Disclosure Battle: CMS Seeks To Publicize Pricing Data" (PDF). Drug Benefit News. August 2010. Archived from the original (PDF) on 2010-12-04.
- Shutan, Bruce (May 2010). "A Bitter Pill". Human Resource Executive.
- "AWP Rollback Spurs PBMs to Use Different Contract Approaches to Cost Neutrality" (PDF). Drug Benefit News. 31 July 2009. Archived from the original (PDF) on 15 July 2011.
- Learner, Neil (January 2009). "PBMs Tout Their Transparency, But Model Doesn't Always Lower Drug Costs for Clients" (PDF). Health Business Daily.
- "PBM Auditing Increases as Rx Costs Rise, But Critics Allege PBMs Are Foiling Audits". Drug Benefit News. 5 September 2008.
- "PBMs Allegedly Manipulate Definition of 'Brand' and 'Generic' Rx at Payer's Expense" (PDF). Health Business Daily. 3 June 2008.
- "Plans Are Urged To Use New RFP Process To Extract Improved PBM Rx Pricing Terms" (PDF). Health Plan Week. 3 March 2008.
- Tooher, Nora L. (6 November 2006). "No Simple Rx for Pharmacy Benefit Litigation". Lawyers USA.
- Fritz, Sara (10 December 2002). "Billions in Drugmaker Rebates Diverted". St. Petersburg Times.
