= Abbe Smith =

American attorney and professor

- Born: Abbe Smith; September 22, 1956 (age 70); Chicago, Illinois
- Education: Yale University (B.A.); New York University School of Law (J.D.)
- Occupations: Professor of Law at Georgetown University Law Center; Criminal Defense Attorney
- Website: Georgetown Law Biography

Abbe Lyn Smith (born September 22, 1956) is an American criminal defense attorney and professor of law at Georgetown University Law Center. Smith is Director of the Criminal Defense and Prisoner Advocacy Clinic and co-director of the E. Barrett Prettyman Fellowship Program.

Before joining the faculty at Georgetown Law, Smith worked as a public defender in Philadelphia for many years and she was also on the faculty at Harvard Law School. Professor Smith regularly writes and comments on criminal defense, the criminal justice system, criminal prosecution, legal ethics, and juvenile justice. Smith wrote a memoir about her experience of helping Patsy Kelly Jarrett earn her freedom from a conviction for which Jarrett maintained her innocence.

== Education ==
Smith earned a B.A.degree from Yale College in 1978 and a J.D. degree from the New York University School of Law in 1982. During her second year of law school at NYU—while working in the Prison Law Clinic with Professor Claudia Angelos—Smith began working on Patsy Kelly Jarrett's federal habeas corpus petition. In March 1977, a jury found Jarrett guilty of two counts of murder and two counts of robbery, but Jarrett maintained her innocence. Smith worked on Jarrett's case for the next 25 years. From 2005 to 2006, Smith was a Fulbright Program scholar at the University of Melbourne School of Law in Melbourne, Australia.

== Legal career ==
=== Public defender ===
After law school, Ms. Smith began work as an assistant public defender with the Defender Association of Philadelphia. She would later work as a member of the Special Defense Unit, and a Senior Trial Attorney. While working as a public defender in Philadelphia, Smith began working as a law professor, teaching criminal law at City University of New York Law School.

=== Law professor ===
In 1990, Smith moved to Harvard Law School where she was deputy director of the Criminal Justice Institute, a clinical instructor in HLS' criminal defense clinic, and a lecturer on law in Harvard's Trial Advocacy Workshop. The Criminal Justice Institute is the curriculum-based criminal law clinical program of Harvard Law School.

Smith joined the Georgetown University Law Center faculty in 1996. Professor Smith is the Director of the Criminal Defense and Prisoner Advocacy (CDPAC) Clinic.

From 1994 to 2005, Smith was the attorney for Patsy Kelly Jarrett. Over the years, Smith contacted journalists, public relations firms and wrote about Kelly in law journals. In 2003, Smith convinced documentarian Ofra Bikel—who was working on a film about guilty pleas for the PBS television show Frontline—to include Jarrett in the documentary. The documentary aired in 2004. During a March 2005 review of the case, the members of the New York Parole Board watched Bikel's account of Jarrett's story, and she was released. Case of a Lifetime was a finalist in the 21st Lambda Literary Awards for best lesbian memoir/biography.

In 2010, she was elected to the American Board of Criminal Lawyers. She is also on the board at the Bronx defenders and the National Juvenile Defender Center. In 2012, she was the recipient of the Legal Teaching Award from New York University School of Law. In 2015, Smith eulogized her friend and colleague Monroe Freedman.

== Writings & commentary ==
Professor Smith writes and comments on criminal defense, the criminal justice system, criminal prosecution, legal ethics, and juvenile justice. Her scholarship has been cited in numerous opinions. In State v. Citizen, The Supreme Court of Louisiana cited her scholarship on indigent defendants' right to appointed counsel under Gideon v. Wainwright.

=== Criminal defense ===
Professor Smith writes about representing unpopular clients. She wrote an opinion article in The Washington Post titled, "What motivates a lawyer to defend a Tsarnaev, a Castro or a Zimmerman?" Smith co-edited How Can You Represent Those People? with Monroe Freedman. In the book—a collection of essays—criminal defense lawyers and others share stories about how it feels to defend people accused of crimes ranging from the ordinary to the horrific. In a piece on Judy Clarke and representing unpopular clients, she remarked: "Criminal defense is kind of a unique calling — not to sound pretentious — it takes a peculiar heart-set, mind-set to do the work for a career." She continued, "We stand behind people who are often the most reviled." She discussed why lawyers defend monsters on MSNBC.

In Too Much Heart and Not Enough Heat: The Short Life and Fractured Ego of the Empathic, Heroic Public Defender, Smith writes about how one can sustain a career in indigent criminal defense. In order to do this, Smith recommends respect for clients, passion for the professional craft of defense lawyering, and a sense of outrage about the system. Smith writes about two former Prettyman fellows who left indigent criminal defense. Smith rejects Charles Ogletree's paradigm of public defenders as empathetic heroes.

In The Bounds of Zeal in Criminal Defense: Some Thoughts on Lynne Stewart, Smith discusses the conduct that led to Lynne Stewart's prosecution and her approach to lawyering generally. Smith examines whether Stewart's view of zeal and devotion is at odds with the prevailing ethics and ethos of defense lawyering. Smith finds it troubling when the government criminally prosecutes members of the defense bar, especially when it goes after lawyers who represent unpopular clients.

=== Prosecutors ===
Smith often writes about prosecutors. In Are Prosecutors Born or Made?, Smith writes about her encounters with prosecutors and countless conversations during the course of her thirty-year criminal law practice. In Can You Be a Good Person and a Good Prosecutor?, Smith examines the morality of prosecution. First, she explores the context of criminal lawyering at the millennium and what it means to prosecute under current conditions. Then, she discusses whether it is possible to do "good" in this context—that is, whether a well-intentioned prosecutor can temper the harsh reality of the criminal justice system—in view of the institutional and cultural pressures of prosecutor offices. Smith concludes by answering the question posed: she hopes so, but thinks not.

In A Call to Abolish Peremptory Challenges by Prosecutors, Smith argues that courts should acknowledge the unenforceability of Batson v. Kentucky, the landmark United States Supreme Court case prohibiting prosecutors from excluding jurors in criminal cases based solely on race, and admit that the only way to end this insidious practice that leads to less diverse juries is to abolish peremptory challenges by prosecutors.

== Books ==
- How Can You Represent Those People? (Abbe Smith & Monroe Freedman eds., New York: Palgrave Macmillan 2013).
- Abbe Smith & Monroe Freedman, Understanding Lawyers' Ethics (New Providence, N.J.: LexisNexis 4th ed. 2010).
- Case of a Lifetime: A Criminal Defense Lawyer's Story (New York: Palgrave MacMillan 2008).
