= Robert Rosenthal (businessman) =

American businessman

Robert D. Rosenthal
- Born: April 28, 1949 (age 77); New York City, New York
- Education: Boston University, cum laude (B.S.); Hofstra University School of Law (J.D.)
- Occupations: Chairman, CEO, and Chief Investment Officer of First Long Island Investors, LLC
- Political party: Republican
- Board member of: Global Industrial (GIC)

Robert D. Rosenthal (born April 28, 1949) is a Long Island businessman and wealth management professional. He is the founder, CEO of First Long Island Investors, a boutique wealth management firm.

== Early life and education ==
Robert D. Rosenthal was born in New York City, New York, to Udith and George Rosenthal. He is the second of three children.

Rosenthal graduated cum laude from Boston University in 1971 and received a J.D. degree from Hofstra University School of Law in 1974. Rosenthal was admitted to the New York State Bar Association in 1975.

== Career ==
=== Early work ===
Rosenthal began his career in 1971 at Entenmann's Inc. From 1971 until 1983, Rosenthal held various positions there, eventually becoming Executive Vice President and Chief Operating Officer. After working on the initial public offering for Entenmann's and assisting with the sale to Warner-Lambert in 1978 and then to General Foods in 1982. In 1983 Rosenthal left Entenmann's and started First Long Island Investors, LLC. He was a member of the Board of Directors of W.P. Stewart & Co., Inc. from 1993 through 1998 and chairman and chief executive officer of W.P. Stewart Asset Management (NA), Inc., a subsidiary of Stewart, and Deputy Managing Director of Stewart from 1998 to 2003. W.P. Stewart & Co., Ltd. was a New York Stock Exchange–listed global investment advisory business which Mr. Rosenthal helped take public in 2000. Stewart was purchased by AllianceBernstein L.P. in 2013. Rosenthal currently serves as lead director of Global Industrial (formerly Systemax), a New York Stock Exchange company.

=== New York Islanders ===
Rosenthal was co-chairman and Co-Chief Executive Officer of the New York Islanders from 1992 to 1997. He was part of a group which had a minority ownership in the franchise and served as a member of the National Hockey League's Board of Governors during this time. Bob was interviewed as part of ESPN's 30 for 30 Big Shot documentary.

=== First Long Island Investors, LLC ===
First Long Island Investors provides comprehensive wealth management and family office services to affluent individuals and families as well as select institutions. The firm was founded on Long Island in 1983 and their clients are predominantly from the tristate area. The company's founders, Robert Rosenthal and Ralph Palleschi met while working at Entenmann's and lead the team that created and executed on the Entenmann family's exit strategy. Rosenthal and Palleschi began managing the family's wealth after the business was sold and then realized that the strategies they used could be beneficial for others. First Long Island Investors takes a long-term view to preserving and growing the wealth of their clients. They employ a prudent asset allocation approach and develop customized plans for each client after developing an understanding of the client's individual goals, needs and risk tolerance.

== Other ==
Rosenthal is a Northwell Health System Trustee, Treasurer and member of the Board of Advisor. He is co-chairman of the Investment Committee. He is also chairman of the advisory board for North Shore University Hospital, the largest hospital in the system.

In May 2014, Rosenthal was recognized by the United Hospital Fund with their Distinguished Trustee Award for his service at Northwell Health.

Rosenthal was elected to the board of trustees of Hofstra University in 2006 and served as Vice Chairman and former Chairman of their Endowment Committee. He retired from the Hofstra Board in October 2025.

On September 24, 2015, Robert D. Rosenthal was presented with one of five Awards for Alumni Achievement at Hofstra's annual Alumni Awards Dinner on September 24, 2015.

On May 2, 2019, Hofstra University held its 23rd Annual Gala and honored Robert D. Rosenthal for his years of dedication and service to the University. The event raised a record-breaking 2.6 million dollars for scholarship. In addition to being the event honoree, Bob was presented with the Presidential Medal, one of the most prestigious awards given by the university. Past Presidential Medal recipients include Dr. Henry Kissinger, Frank Sinatra, and Eli Weisel, among others.

== Personal life ==
Robert D. Rosenthal married Jodi Bernstein on August 7, 1993. He has four children – Julie, Jennifer (married to Adam Leitman Bailey), Lindsay (married to Andrew Maller), and Gregory. He is a member of the New York Breeders Association, racing horses out of Saratoga, Aqueduct, and Belmont. One of his horses, Galloping Grocer, named for his longtime partner in the horse business, Ira Waldbaum, was the 2 year old NY champion in 2004. In October 2017, Berning Rose, a 2-year-old filly that Bob owns with Bradford Bernstein won the Maid of the Mist, which is a New York-bred stakes race held at Belmont Park. Two of her off spring, Bernietakescharge and Bernieandtherose, won a combined five stakes races in 2025.

In recent years, Rosenthal has become more active in the Republican Party hosting events for Mitt Romney in 2012 and for the former Secretary of State, Condoleezza Rice and Senators Orrin Hatch and Bob Corker in 2014. In addition, in 2014 he hosted an event for Speaker of the House John Boehner and candidate for United States Congress, in New York's 1st congressional district, Lee Zeldin (who was subsequently elected to Congress). He has also co-chaired events for Congressman Andrew R. Garbarino (R-NY-02) along with former Speaker of the U.S. House of Representatives Kevin McCarthy and Speaker of the House Mike Johnson.
