= Robert A. Baruch Bush =

American legal scholar

Robert Baruch Bush
- Born: Robert Alan Baruch Bush; January 24, 1948 (age 78)(died 2026); Phoenix, Arizona, U.S.

Academic background
- Education: Harvard University (BA); Stanford University (JD)

Academic work
- Discipline: Law
- Sub-discipline: Mediation; Alternative dispute resolution
- Institutions: Hofstra University

Robert Alan Baruch Bush (born January 24, 1948) is an American legal scholar working as the Harry H. Rains Distinguished Professor of Alternative Dispute Resolution (ADR) Law at the Maurice A. Deane School of Law.

== Early life and education ==
Bush was born in Phoenix, Arizona. He earned a Bachelor of Arts degree from Harvard University in 1969 and a Juris Doctor from the Stanford Law School in 1974.

== Career ==
Together with Joseph Folger of Temple University he is the originator, and best known advocate, of the transformative model of mediation. He has authored over two dozen articles and books on mediation and ADR. In 2006 he received the Annual PeaceBuilder Award by the New York State Dispute Resolution Association to honor individuals and organizations that have promoted the field of ADR.

He authored an article on mediation in the Jewish tradition, discovering that many of his earlier research findings were compatible with Jewish principles of mediation (P'shara).

He has practiced mediation in various contexts since starting a community mediation program in San Francisco in 1976, and has developed and conducted many training programs on mediation and ADR, including training for lawyers and judges. He has been at Hofstra Law School since 1980.

== Personal life ==
Coming from a secular Jewish environment, in his adult life, Bush became an orthodox Chabad Jew.

== Bibliography ==
- Bush, Baruch: The Dilemmas of Mediation Practice (National Institute for Dispute Resolution, 1992)
- Bush, Baruch, and Joseph Folger: The Promise of Mediation (Jossey-Bass, 1994)
- Bush, Baruch, and Joseph Folger: The Promise of Mediation (revised Jossey-Bass, 2004) Despite the similar title, almost entirely different from the 1994 first edition
- Bush, Robert Baruch. Expectations for International Mediation Interaction: Conference Report. Summer 1996. V. 8, No. 2. pp. 5–18.
- Bush, Baruch, and Joseph Folger: Designing Mediation: Approaches to Training and Practice within a Transformative Framework (Institute for the Study of Conflict Transformation, 2001).
