= Thomas Wales =

American federal prosecutor (1952–2001)

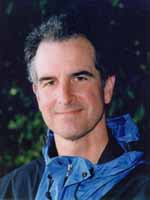
- Born: June 23, 1952; Boston, Massachusetts, U.S.
- Died: October 12, 2001 (aged 49); Seattle, Washington, U.S.
- Cause of death: Murder
- Education: Harvard University (BA); Hofstra University (JD)
- Occupation: Assistant United States Attorney

Thomas Crane Wales (June 23, 1952 – October 12, 2001) was an American federal prosecutor and gun control advocate who was the victim of an unsolved murder. In 2018, FBI investigators announced they strongly suspected the killing to have been carried out by a paid hitman.

== Early life and education ==
Thomas Wales was born in Boston, Massachusetts. He was a graduate of Milton Academy, where he roomed with Joseph Patrick Kennedy II, the son of Robert F. Kennedy. Wales graduated from Harvard University in 1974 and Hofstra University‘s Maurice A. Deane School of Law in 1979, where he graduated with distinction and served as the Editor-in-Chief of the Hofstra Law Review. In 1983, Wales became an Assistant United States Attorney in Seattle, Washington, where he specialized in fraud prosecutions.

In addition to his work as a prosecutor, Wales was very active in civic organizations and public service. Wales served as a member of the Seattle Planning Commission, and was on the Mayor's Citizen Advisory Committee.

== Career ==
In 1995, a student at the high school that Wales' son attended brought a gun to school and shot and injured two classmates. Soon after, Wales became involved in Washington CeaseFire, most visibly as a vocal supporter of an unsuccessful 1997 state referendum that would have required gun owners to use trigger locks. Wales later became president of CeaseFire. As a community volunteer, he was active in civic organizations and served as a trustee of the Federal Bar Association.

Wales worked as an Assistant U.S. Attorney in the United States Attorney’s Office for the Western District of Washington in Seattle, specializing in the investigation and prosecution of financial fraud.

== Death ==
On the evening of Thursday, October 11, 2001, at approximately 10:40 p.m., Wales was sitting at a computer in his office in the basement of his home at 108 Hayes Street. A gunman avoided the security lights in Wales' backyard and shot him once in the neck and once in the chest through a window, using a Makarov pistol fitted with an aftermarket barrel. The killer left shell casings behind. The shots were heard by a neighbor who called 9-1-1. The FBI stated that a lone male suspect was reported to have been observed fleeing the scene.

Wales died at a hospital the next day. He is believed to be the only U.S. federal prosecutor in history to have been assassinated.

=== Murder investigation ===
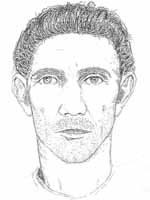
Sketch of the suspect

Following the murder, the federal government offered a $1 million reward for information "leading to the arrest and conviction of the person or persons responsible" for Wales' murder. As of 2018, however, the case remained unsolved and no evidence has been found to establish a motive. An airplane pilot living in Bellevue, a firearms enthusiast who Wales had prosecuted, was investigated and his home searched, but he was not charged. Agents believed he resented Wales' off-duty activism as a leading gun-control advocate. The pilot later filed a malicious prosecution claim but the suit was dismissed.

In early 2003 Scott Lee Kimball, later found to be a serial killer, was working as an FBI informant. He had told agents that a former cellmate of his when he had been in federal detention awaiting trial in Alaska had confessed to having killed Wales. But when he was given the chance to meet with the man, by then released as well, Kimball failed to steer the conversation toward the crime in the way the agents had coached him and seemed, in fact, to barely be acquainted with the man. Kimball failed a lie detector test administered afterwards, and agents suspected he had fabricated the account even as he continued to insist he had not.

In June 2007, the FBI cut the staff assigned to the case down to two.

In February 2018, an FBI official reported the investigation had found "evidence strongly suggesting" Wales was murdered by a contract killer and, for the first time, indicated that his death was likely a conspiracy involving a small group of people. The United States Department of Justice, meanwhile, announced that then-Deputy Attorney General Rod Rosenstein would arrive in Seattle on Wednesday, February 21, 2018, to brief media on the progress of the 16-year-old investigation.

First in 2011 and then in 2018, the FBI released footage of Wales' grown children requesting tips and publicizing the $1 million reward.

A video offering a $1 Million reward for tips in the Thomas Wales murder case

=== Legacy ===
In his memory, the Thomas C. Wales Foundation was established to support civic engagement, and Thomas C. Wales Park in Seattle was dedicated in 2011.

== See also ==
- Jonathan Luna
- Ray Gricar
- List of Harvard University people
- List of unsolved murders (2000–present)
