= Ray Gricar =

American lawyer who disappeared in 2005

- Gricar photo from FBI missing person poster

District Attorney of Centre County
- In office 1985–2005
- Preceded by: Robert Mix
- Succeeded by: Michael T. Madeira

Personal details
- Born: October 9, 1945 Cleveland, Ohio, U.S.
- Party: Republican
- Children: Lara
- Education: University of Dayton; Case Western Reserve University
- Disappeared: April 15, 2005 (aged 59); Centre Hall, Pennsylvania, U.S.
- Status: declared legally dead July 25, 2011 (aged 65)

Ray Frank Gricar (/ˈɡriːkɑːr/; born October 9, 1945, missing since April 15, 2005) was an American lawyer who served as the district attorney of Centre County, Pennsylvania, from 1985 until 2005. On April 15, 2005, Gricar went missing under mysterious circumstances and has not been heard from since. After he had been missing for years with no trace of his whereabouts, Centre County authorities declared Gricar legally dead on July 25, 2011.

Born in Cleveland, Gricar received his Juris Doctor degree from Case Western Reserve University School of Law and began his career as a prosecutor for Cuyahoga County. He moved to State College, Pennsylvania, around 1980 and, after a brief stint as an assistant district attorney, was elected district attorney of Centre County in 1985. He was re-elected four times before announcing that he would not run for re-election in the 2005 campaign.

Gricar was reported missing to authorities after failing to return home from a road trip. His car was found in Lewisburg with his cell phone inside, and at a later date his laptop computer and the laptop's hard drive were found in the adjacent Susquehanna River. The hard drive was found in a different location in the river than where the laptop was found, which indicated that the hard drive was removed before the laptop was tossed into the river. No further trace of Gricar has been found.

== Early life and career ==
Ray Gricar was born in Cleveland, Ohio, and grew up in the city's Collinwood neighborhood. He attended high school at the Gilmour Academy, a prestigious Catholic school in Gates Mills, and enrolled at the University of Dayton (UD), where he became interested in studying law after working as an intern for the prosecutor's office. After graduating, Gricar moved back to Cleveland to study law at Case Western Reserve University School of Law. He obtained his Juris Doctor and subsequently took a job as a prosecutor for Cuyahoga County, specializing in prosecuting cases of rape and murder.

In 1980, Gricar moved to State College, Pennsylvania, where his wife had taken a job at Pennsylvania State University (Penn State). He opted to become a stay-at-home dad to his young daughter following the move. However, Centre County District Attorney David E. Grine offered Gricar an assistant position, which he accepted. In 1985, the incumbent district attorney, Robert Mix (Grine's successor), chose not to run for re-election, and Gricar ran for the open position. He won the election by a margin of 600 votes.

Gricar's office was part-time when he was elected, and he successfully campaigned to make it full-time in 1996. He was re-elected in 1989, 1993, 1997, and 2001. During his tenure, in 1998, Gricar declined to press charges against longtime Penn State assistant football coach Jerry Sandusky following allegations of child sexual abuse; Sandusky was charged and convicted of multiple counts of sexual abuse thirteen years later. In 2004, Gricar announced he would not run for re-election and would retire from practicing law altogether in December 2005, shortly after his 60th birthday.

== Personal life ==
Gricar met Barbara Gray during his undergraduate study at UD. She moved to Cleveland with him after graduation and they married in 1969. They adopted a baby girl, Lara, in 1978. Ray and Barbara Gricar divorced in 1991; Ray married again in 1996, but divorced in 2001. In 2002 or 2003, Gricar moved in with his girlfriend Patty Fornicola, an employee of the Centre County District Attorney's office. He was living with Fornicola in her childhood home in Bellefonte at the time of his disappearance.

Gricar's older brother Roy disappeared from his West Chester, Ohio, home in May 1996. His body was found a week later in the Great Miami River; authorities ruled his death a suicide.

== Disappearance ==
At 11:30 a.m. (EDT) on April 15, 2005, Gricar called Fornicola to inform her that he was driving through the Brush Valley area northeast of Centre Hall. Gricar failed to return home, and late that evening, Fornicola reported him missing.

The following day, investigators identified Gricar's red Mini Cooper in the parking lot of an antique store in Lewisburg. The car contained his county-issued cell phone but not his laptop computer, keys, or wallet. Investigators identified no signs of foul play. Police and family members noted that the location of the vehicle, adjacent to two bridges over the Susquehanna River, bore some similarities to the location of the vehicle of Gricar's older brother Roy when he committed suicide in 1996. In the days following the discovery of Gricar's vehicle, authorities searched the river and its banks but found no sign of him. Police also noted that a sniffer dog's behavior around where Gricar's car was found suggested that he might have gotten into another vehicle with someone else. Pennsylvania authorities asked the FBI to analyze Gricar's bank accounts, credit card records, and cell phone records, but found no clues as to where he may have been.

On July 30, fishermen discovered Gricar's county-issued laptop in the Susquehanna River beneath a bridge between Lewisburg and Milton, but its hard drive was missing. Divers searched the area of the river near where it was found over the next several days, but found nothing else. Two months later, someone recovered a hard drive on the banks of the Susquehanna River about 100 yards (91 m) from the location of the laptop, and investigators hypothesized that it had come from his computer; however, it was badly damaged, and analysis by the FBI, the U.S. Secret Service, and the data-recovery firm Kroll Ontrack failed to recover anything from it. In April 2009, Bellefonte police revealed that before Gricar's disappearance, someone had used the home computer at the residence he shared with Fornicola to perform internet searches on topics such as "how to wreck a hard drive", "how to fry a hard drive" and "water damage to a notebook computer".

In June 2011, Gricar's daughter Lara, who was trustee of his estate, petitioned Centre County to declare him dead. County President Judge David E. Grine declared him "dead in absentia" on July 25, 2011. The following day, police in Utah arrested a man resembling Gricar on a misdemeanor charge who refused to reveal his identity. This "John Doe" resembled Gricar in height and weight, lips, and even some wrinkles, and the similarities led to speculation that Gricar had been found. Centre County authorities sent copies of Gricar's fingerprints to Utah, but they did not match. Authorities eventually identified the man.

== Theories ==
There are three main theories about Gricar.

The primary theory is he died by suicide just as his brother had done, with similarities between the two cases cited in favor of this idea. Police working on the case believed suicide was most likely, but Gricar’s family disputes this conclusion. Although Gricar was a poor swimmer, he had no medical history of depression or of suicidal thoughts. He was also reportedly looking forward to his upcoming retirement.

The second theory is Gricar wished to start a new life and therefore engineered his disappearance. He allegedly expressed interest in the case of a Cleveland police chief who had disappeared with such a goal. Multiple sightings of Gricar were reported after his disappearance, most notably in a bar in Wilkes-Barre, where both the bartender and an off-duty police officer claimed to have seen him watching a baseball game. It has also been suggested Gricar may have traveled to Central Europe. He was fluent in Slovenian and had a lesser grasp on Russian. He had relatives in Slovenia and visited this region. Police asked Gricar’s girlfriend and his stepdaughter to take polygraph exams, with pointed questions about any voluntarily disappearance, but police were satisfied they had no such knowledge.

The third theory is foul play. Early on it was suggested Gricar's disappearance might be linked to the unsolved death of Jonathan Luna, an Assistant U.S. Attorney who was found dead in a Lancaster County creek in December 2003. Shortly before Gricar’s disappearance he was involved in police investigation of an illegal drugs gang, but no evidence was found linking this case to his fate. Additionally, speculation focused on Gricar’s deciding to never file charges against Sandusky for alleged child sexual abuse might be linked to the disappearance.

== In popular culture ==
Gricar's disappearance was the subject of television documentary programs, including episodes of Haunting Evidence on Court TV in June 2006, Disappeared on Investigation Discovery in February 2011, news magazine Dateline NBC in December 2011, and an episode of Crime Junkie podcast in January 2020. An episode of the drama Without a Trace on CBS referred to the case.

== See also ==
- Thomas Wales
- Jonathan Luna
- List of people who disappeared mysteriously (2000–present)
