= Ann Pfau =

American judge

Chief Administrative Judge of the State of New York
- In office 2007–2011
- Nominated by: Judith S. Kaye
- Preceded by: Jonathan Lippman
- Succeeded by: A. Gail Prudenti

Personal details
- Education: Wells College (BA); Columbia University (MA); Brooklyn Law School (JD)

Ann Pfau is an American jurist and former Chief Administrative Judge of the State of New York.

== Early life and education ==
She graduated from Wells College in 1970. She later received a M.A. from Columbia University in 1973 and a J.D. from the Brooklyn Law School in 1984.

== Legal career ==
Pfau began her legal career in Counsel's Office of the Office of Court Administration. She was appointed in 1997 as an Interim Judge of the New York City Civil Court and in 1998 as a Judge of the New York City Criminal Court. She currently is an Acting Supreme Court Justice in the Second Judicial District.

Judge Pfau served as First Deputy Chief Administrative Judge of New York until her appointment as Chief Administrative Judge and prior to that was the Administrative Judge of the Supreme Court, Second Judicial District.

=== Tenure as Chief Administrative Judge ===
She was appointed Chief Administrative Judge of all New York State courts in 2007 following an appointment by former Chief Judge Judith S. Kaye. As the Chief Administrative Judge, Pfau oversaw the administration and operation of the Statewide court system with a $2.53 billion budget, 3,600 State and locally paid Judges and over 15,200 nonjudicial employees in over 300 locations around the State.

She stepped down on Dec. 1, 2011 to take over a medical malpractice program and try cases in her home borough of Brooklyn.

In 2012, Pfau was honored with the Stanley H. Fuld Award of the Commercial and Federal Litigation Section of the New York State Bar Association.

Legal offices
| Preceded by Jonathan Lippman | Chief Administrative Judge of the State of New York; 2007-2011 | Succeeded by A. Gail Prudenti |
