= Kevin Jon Heller =

International law scholar

Kevin Jon Heller is a scholar of international law who is a Professor of International Law & Security at the University of Copenhagen's Centre for Military Studies. He has also taught at the University of Amsterdam, SOAS, University of London, and Melbourne Law School.

He is a special adviser on war crimes for the Office of the Prosecutor of the International Criminal Court."

He is co-editor-in-chief of the international-law blog Opinio Juris.

== Works ==
- Heller, Kevin Jon (1996). "Power, Subjectification and Resistance in Foucault". SubStance. 25 (1): 78–110. doi:10.2307/3685230. ISSN 0049-2426. JSTOR 3685230.
- Heller, Kevin (2006). "The Cognitive Psychology of Circumstantial Evidence". Michigan Law Review. 105 (2): 241–305. ISSN 0026-2234.
- Heller, Kevin Jon (2007). "The Shadow Side of Complementarity: The Effect of Article 17 of the Rome Statute on National Due Process". Criminal Law Forum. 17 (3–4): 255–280. doi:10.1007/s10609-006-9019-0. S2CID 59402278.
- Heller, Kevin Jon; Dubber, Markus (2010). The Handbook of Comparative Criminal Law. Stanford University Press. ISBN 978-0-8047-7729-2.
- Heller, Kevin Jon (2011). The Nuremberg Military Tribunals and the Origins of International Criminal Law. Oxford University Press. ISBN 978-0-19-923233-8.
