= Mary J. Schoelen =

American judge

Mary Schoenlen
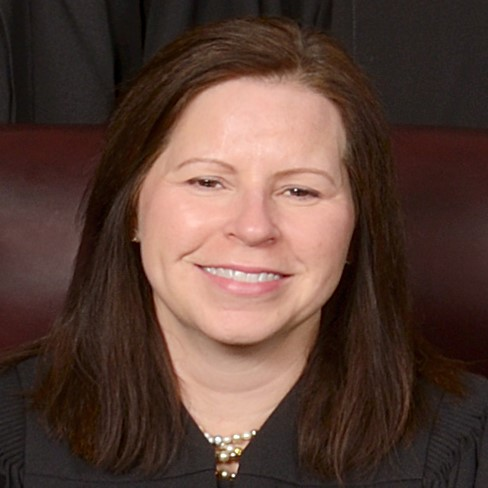
- Judge Schoelen in 2018

Senior Judge of the United States Court of Appeals for Veterans Claims
- Incumbent
- Assumed office December 20, 2019

Judge of the United States Court of Appeals for Veterans Claims
- In office December 20, 2004 – December 20, 2019
- Appointed by: George W. Bush
- Preceded by: John J. Farley III
- Succeeded by: Scott J. Laurer

Personal details
- Born: Mary Jeannette Schoelen Rota, Spain
- Spouse: Bradley Smith
- Education: University of California, Irvine (BA); George Washington University (JD)

Mary Jeannette Schoelen is a senior judge of the United States Court of Appeals for Veterans Claims.

== Early life and education ==
Schoelen was born in Rota, Spain, where her father, a career naval officer, was stationed. She received a Bachelor of Arts from the University of California, Irvine in 1990 and Juris Doctor from the George Washington University Law School in 1993. During law school, she worked as a law clerk for the National Veterans Legal Services Project, representing appellants at the Board of Veterans' Appeals.

== Legal career ==
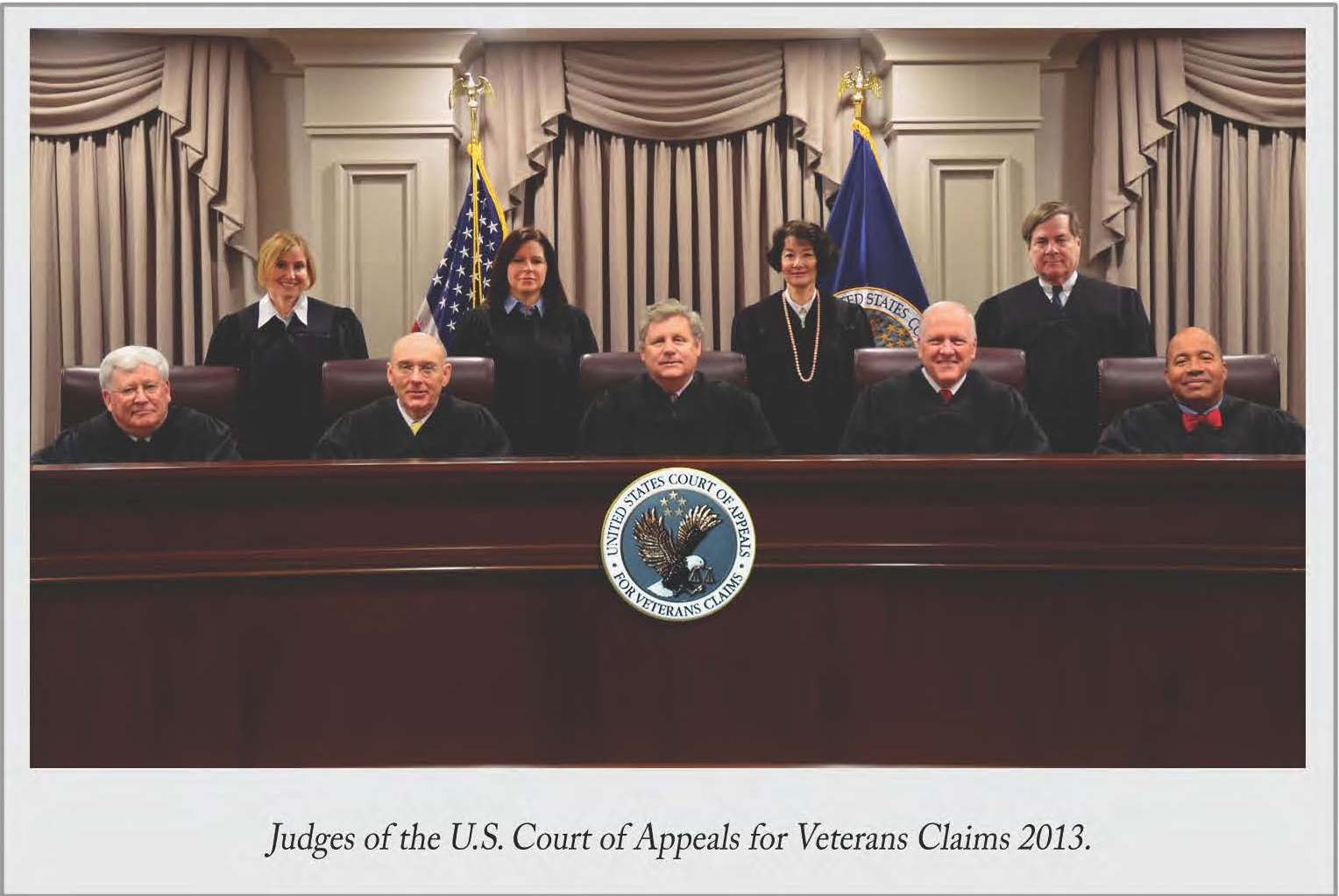
United States Court of Appeals for Veterans Claims in 2013

In 1994, Schoelen interned with the United States Senate Committee on Veterans' Affairs, working on various issues pertaining to adjudication of veterans benefits claims. In November 1994, she began working as a staff attorney for Vietnam Veterans of America's Veterans Benefits Program.

Schoelen rejoined the United States Senate Committee on Veterans' Affairs staff in March 1997, where she was responsible for development and implementation of policy pertaining to veterans benefits, as well as oversight of the implementation of the policy. She served as Minority Counsel from March 1997 to March 2001, as Minority General Counsel from March 2001 to June 2001, as Deputy Staff Director for Benefits Programs and General Counsel from June 2001 to January 2003, and Deputy Staff Director for Benefits Programs and General Counsel from January 2003 to December 2004 under Chairman and Ranking Member Jay Rockefeller and Ranking Member Bob Graham.

=== Court of Appeals for Veterans Claims ===
On December 20, 2004, Schoelen was sworn into office for a 15 year term on the United States Court of Appeals for Veterans Claims. She was nominated by President George W. Bush.

Legal offices
Preceded by John J. Farley III	Judge of the United States Court of Appeals for Veterans Claims; 2004–2019	Succeeded by Scott J. Laurer
