= Tsarnaev =

Tsarnaev is a surname from Chechnya. Notable people with the surname include:

- Dzhokhar Tsarnaev (born 1993), Kyrgyz-born terrorist who perpetrated the Boston Marathon bombing in 2013, brother of Tamerlan
- Tamerlan Tsarnaev (1986–2013), Russian-born terrorist who perpetrated the Boston Marathon bombing in 2013, brother of Dzhokhar
