= John J. Farley III =

American judge (born 1942)

Jack Farley
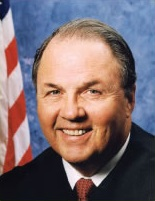

Senior Judge of the United States Court of Appeals for Veterans Claims
- In office 2004–2012

Judge of the United States Court of Appeals for Veterans Claims
- In office September 15, 1989 – 2004
- Appointed by: George H. W. Bush
- Preceded by: Seat established
- Succeeded by: Mary J. Schoelen

Personal details
- Born: July 30, 1942 (age 83)
- Education: College of the Holy Cross (BA); Columbia University (MBA); Hofstra University (JD)

John J. "Jack" Farley III (born July 30, 1942) is a retired judge of the United States Court of Appeals for Veterans Claims.

In September 1989, Jack Farley was nominated by President George H. W. Bush and confirmed by the United States Senate as a Judge of the United States Court of Veterans Appeals for a term of fifteen years. After serving the Court in recall status for seven additional years, he retired in 2012. Prior to his appointment, Judge Farley was a member of the Senior Executive Service and a Director of the Torts Branch, Civil Division, United States Department of Justice, with responsibility for, inter alia, the defense of the United States in the massive asbestos litigation and the representation and defense of personally-sued federal employees in common law and constitutional tort litigation.

== Biography ==
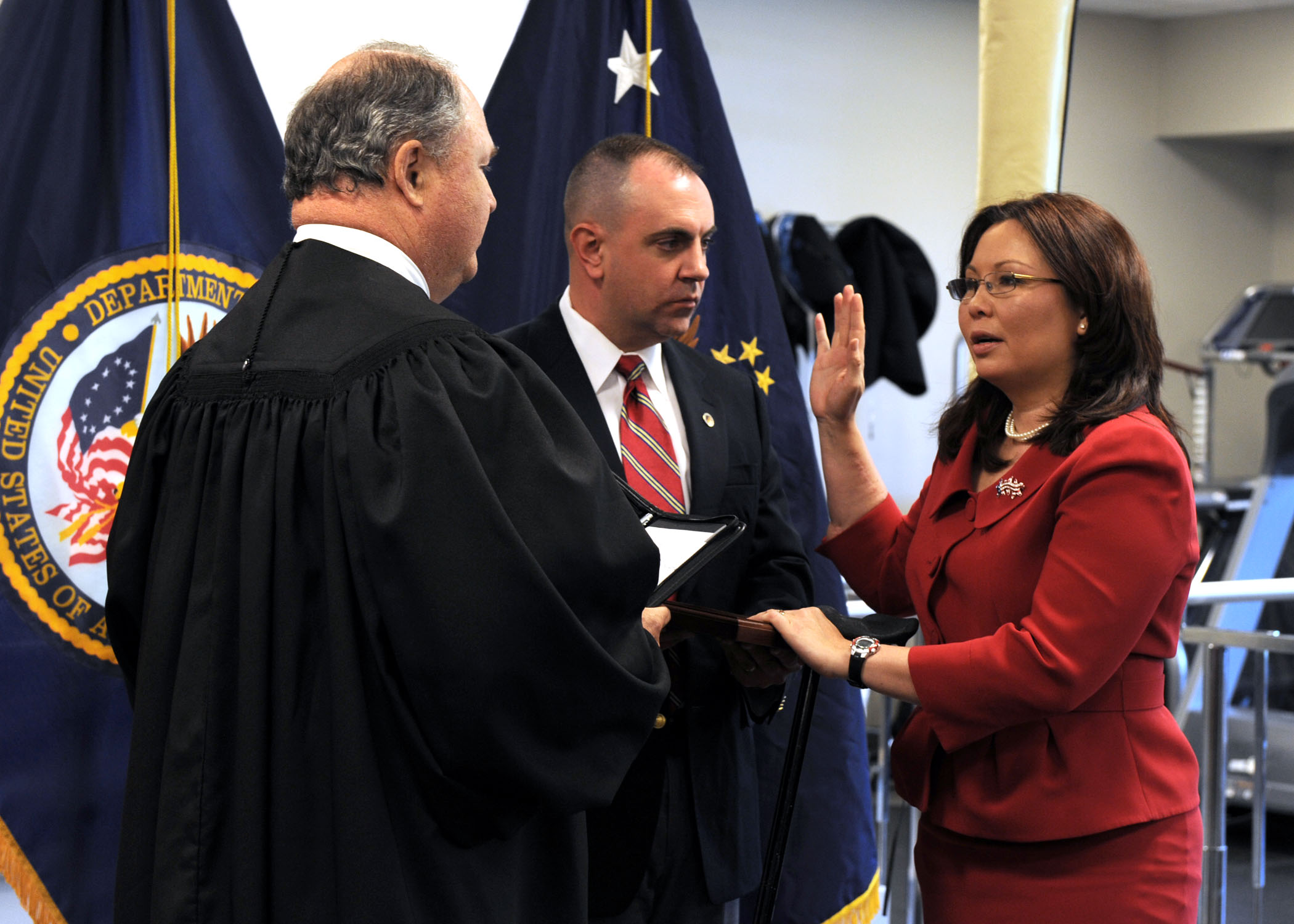
Farley swearing in Tammy Duckworth as Assistant Secretary of Veterans Affairs for Public and Intergovernmental Affairs

Judge Farley received his A.B. degree in economics in 1964 from the College of the Holy Cross, where he was captain of the freshman and varsity lacrosse teams, and his M.B.A. degree in 1966 from the Columbia University Graduate School of Business where he was a Samuel Bronfman Fellow and president of Alpha Kappa Psi, the professional business fraternity. He received his Juris Doctor, cum laude, in 1973 from Hofstra University School of Law, graduating first in his class and serving as the founding Editor-in-Chief of the Hofstra Law Review.

Judge Farley served in the U. S. Army from 1966 until his retirement as a captain in 1970 due to 100% disability from wounds received during combat in Vietnam. His decorations include four Bronze Star Awards (three with "V" Device), two Purple Hearts, and the Army Commendation Medal. From 1973 to 1978, he was a trial attorney in the Torts Section, Civil Division, U. S. Department of Justice; from 1978 to 1980 he served as Assistant Director of the Torts Branch.

The author of numerous articles, Judge Farley has been a lecturer and faculty member at the ABA Appellate Judges Seminars; Attorney General's Advocacy Institute; F.B.I. Academy; OPM Executive Seminar Centers; Federal Executive Institute; and Federal Judicial Center. He was a commencement speaker and recipient of the Distinguished Alumni Medal, Hofstra University School of Law in 1986. From 1986 to 1989, Judge Farley served on the board of directors of the Senior Executives Association. In November 1990, he became the first chairman of the Veterans Law Section of the Federal Bar Association. In 1995, he received the Dean's Award for Distinguished Hofstra Law School Alumni. In 1999, he was inducted into the Massapequa High School Hall of Fame. In 2006, he received the In Hoc Signo Award from the College of the Holy Cross. The Paralyzed Veterans of America presented Judge Farley with the Harry A. Schweikert Jr. Disability Awareness Award at its Annual Convention in August 2007.

Judge Farley taught administrative law and federal litigation as an adjunct professor at the Columbus School of Law of The Catholic University of America. He was a member of the board of directors of the Amputee Coalition of America (ACA) and the U.S. Armed Forces Amputee Patient Care Program. An ACA-certified amputee peer visitor and trainer, Judge Farley continues to train and certify amputee peer visitors at Walter Reed National Military Medical Center and Brooke Army Medical Center, and he was on the faculty of the Military Amputees Advanced Skills Training Programs at Walter Reed (2004 & 2007) and Brooke (2006).

He has co-founded and is vice-president of n2grate Government Technology Solutions, LLC ("n2grate"). n2grate focuses on hardware, software, training, data center and cloud services, and professional development for public sector and large business clients.

His wife of 42 years, Kathleen Wells Farley, died suddenly in July 2011; they have four children and thirteen grandchildren. An avid golfer, skier, and instructor of disabled skiers, Judge Farley completed the 2005 New York City Marathon, the 2013 Palm Beaches Marathon, and the 2006 - 2008 and 2011 - 2016 Marine Corps Marathons on a hand cycle with wounded warriors from Iraq and Afghanistan. On December 26, 2021, he married Catherine Cassot (nee Betzag), a Massapequa High School classmate. They reside in Bowie, Maryland.

Legal offices
New seat	Judge of the United States Court of Appeals for Veterans Claims; 1989–2004	Succeeded by Mary J. Schoelen
