= Hofstra Labor and Employment Law Journal =

Hofstra Labor & Employment Law Journal
- Language: English

Publication details
- Former names: Hofstra Labor Law Forum (1983); Hofstra Labor Law Journal (1984–1997)
- History: 1982–present
- Frequency: Biannually

Standard abbreviations
- Bluebook: Hofstra Lab. & Emp. L.J.
- ISO 4: Hofstra Labor Employ. Law J.

Indexing
- ISSN: 1052-3332
- OCLC no.: 1010527911

Links
- Journal homepage

The Hofstra Labor and Employment Law Journal is an American law journal which publishes articles in the field of labor and employment law.

The journal was founded as the Hofstra Labor Law Journal in 1982. It publishes articles on labor law and employment relations, covering issues such as the National Labor Relations Act, employment discrimination, termination, sexual harassment, the Americans With Disabilities Act, work for hire, whistleblower and retaliatory discharge, workplace and union governance, dispute resolution and other topics.

The journal is published two times a year.

== See also ==
- Hofstra Law Review
