= Monroe H. Freedman =

American lawyer and academic administrator

2nd Dean of the Maurice A. Deane School of Law
- In office 1973–1977
- Preceded by: Malachy Mahon
- Succeeded by: John Regan

Personal details
- Born: Monroe Henry Freedman; April 10, 1928 Mount Vernon, New York; United States
- Died: February 28, 2015 (aged 86)
- Spouse: Audrey Willock
- Children: 4
- Education: Harvard College; Harvard Law School

Monroe Henry Freedman (April 10, 1928 – February 26, 2015) was an American lawyer and academic administrator, who worked as a professor of law and dean at the Maurice A. Deane School of Law at Hofstra University in Hempstead, New York. He lectured at Harvard Law School annually for 30 years, and was a visiting professor at Georgetown Law School from 2007 to 2012. He has been described as "a pioneer in the field of legal ethics" and "one of the nation's leading experts on legal ethics."

== Biography ==
=== Early life and education ===
Freedman was born in Mount Vernon, New York, the son of Dorothea (Kornblum) and Chauncey Freedman. He attended Harvard College and Harvard Law School, receiving an A.B. cum laude in 1951, an LL.B. in 1954, and an LL.M. from Harvard Law School in 1956.

=== Adult life and career ===
In the early part of his career, Freedman taught at The George Washington University Law School. He taught Contracts every year, beginning in the 1960-1961 academic year, and Appellate Practice & Procedure, beginning in the 1962-1963 academic year, along with other occasional courses including Current Decisions (for Law Review members), Equity, Agency, and Federal Jurisdiction. During the 1960s, he encouraged many women to attend law school, based on the idea that the law school would benefit from having more women in the student body. One effectual way Professor Freedman taught ethics was to point out and discuss ethical issues that arose in cases already under discussion from the contracts textbook.

In 1973, Freedman became the second Dean of the Maurice A. Deane School of Law at Hofstra University in Hempstead, New York, succeeding Malachy Mahon. Freedman served in this capacity through 1977, being succeeded by John Regan; he would continue to serve as a professor at the school until his death in 2015.

Freedman is noted for criticism of restrictions on lawyer advertising, restrictions on trial publicity by defendants and defense attorneys. He has argued that lawyers should be permitted to reveal information necessary to prevent death or serious bodily harm, that law professors' sexual relations with students should be recognized as unethical conduct, and that the lawyer's decision to represent a client is a moral decision.

During the 1960s, Freedman served as chair of the National Capital Area American Civil Liberties Union, was counsel to several civil rights organizations, and was a consultant to the U.S. Civil Rights Commission. He was volunteer general counsel of the Mattachine Society. He was the first executive director of the United States Holocaust Memorial Council.

Freedman has received many awards and honors, including the American Bar Association's Michael Franck Award for Professional Responsibility in 1998.

=== Personal life and death ===
Freedman died on February 26, 2015, aged 86. The cause of death was chronic lymphocytic lymphoma. His wife, economist Audrey Willock Freedman, had died in 1998. They had four children, two of whom survived him. Abbe Smith eulogized him.

== Writings ==
Freedman's first ethics book, Lawyers' Ethics in an Adversary System, was published in 1975 and received the ABA's Gavel Award Certificate of Merit. It received a number of favorable reviews; in the Harvard Civil Rights/Civil Liberties Law Review, NYU professor Norman Dorsen called the book one of the few "monumental contributions to legal education in the past generation."

Understanding Lawyers' Ethics, first published in 1990, is required or recommended reading in many law schools. The ABA journal The Professional Lawyer called the book "thoughtful and eloquent" and "idealistic in the best sense of the word, pragmatic, but not cynical, and rich with practical examples."

Among his many articles on lawyers' ethics is "The Professional Responsibility of the Criminal Defense Lawyer: The Three Hardest Questions" (1966), about which William H. Simon wrote: "Suppose you had to pick the two most influential events in the recent emergence of ethics as a subject of serious reflection by the bar. Most likely, you would name the Watergate affair of 1974 and the appearance [in 1966] of an article by Monroe Freedman." That article provoked controversy because of Freedman's emphasis on the criminal defense lawyer's central duty to serve as an advocate for the client, even when the lawyer believes the client may intend to lie on the witness stand. Warren E. Burger, then chief judge of the United States Court of Appeals for the District of Columbia Circuit and later Chief Justice of the United States, was so unhappy with Freedman's position that he unsuccessfully initiated disbarment proceedings.

== See also ==
- A. Gail Prudenti
- Stuart Rabinowitz
