= Eric Lane (legal scholar) =

U.S. legal scholar and author (born 1943)

Eric Lane (born 1943) is a U.S. legal scholar and author. He is the Eric J. Schmertz Distinguished Professor of Public Law and Public Service at the Maurice A. Deane School of Law at Hofstra University. Lane graduated from Brown University in 1965 with a BA and Fordham University in 1970 with a JD. He joined the Hofstra Law faculty in 1976 and has taught courses in law and literature, constitutional law, statutory interpretation and the legislative process.

== Publications ==
Lane is the author of three books. His trade book, written with Michael Oreskes, senior managing editor of the Associated Press, "The Genius of America: How the Constitution Saved Our Country and Why It Can Again" received favorable reviews throughout the country.

Lane has previously served as the senior fellow at the Brennan Center for Justice at New York University School of Law. In that role, he wrote the report with Meg Barnette; "A Report Card on New York's Civic Literacy", which was published in April 2011.

In 1990 Lane chaired the New York City Task Force on Charter Implementation, and from 1986 to 1989, he served as executive director/counsel to the historic New York City Charter Revision Commission.
