= Donald Trump judicial appointment controversies =

Donald Trump, the 45th president of the United States from 2017 to 2021, entered office with a significant number of judicial vacancies, including a Supreme Court vacancy due to the death of Antonin Scalia in February 2016. During the first eight months of his presidency, he nominated approximately 50 judges, a higher number than any other recent president had made by that point in his presidency. By June 24, 2020, 200 of his Article III nominees had been confirmed by the United States Senate. Media outlets reported that Trump's judicial appointments changed the composition of the Supreme Court and lower courts during his tenure.

As of February 3, 2020, the American Bar Association (ABA) had rated 220 of Trump's nominees. Of these nominees, 187 were rated "well-qualified," 67 were rated "qualified," and 10 were rated "not qualified." Seven of the nine individuals rated as "not qualified" were confirmed by the Senate.

According to Vox's Ian Millhiser, "There’s no completely objective way to measure legal ability, but a common metric used by legal employers to identify the most gifted lawyers is whether those lawyers secured a federal clerkship, including the most prestigious clerkships at the Supreme Court. Approximately 40 percent of Trump’s appellate nominees clerked for a Supreme Court justice, and about 80 percent clerked on a federal court of appeals. That compares to less than a quarter of Obama’s nominees who clerked on the Supreme Court, and less than half with a federal appellate clerkship." As of July 2020, the judges appointed by Trump are "85% white and 76% male; less than 5% are African-American," as a result of which the federal judiciary has become "less diverse" compared to previous administrations, according to an analysis by The Conversation.

== List of unsuccessful federal judicial nominations ==
Trump made 46 nominations for federal judgeships that were not confirmed by the Senate. Of these, 6 were withdrawn by President Trump, 32 expired at an adjournment of the Senate, and 8 were withdrawn by President Joe Biden after he took office.

Nominee	Court	Nomination date	Date of final action	Final action	Subsequent federal judicial nominations	Seat filled by	Ref.
Courts of appeals
Ryan Bounds	9th Cir.	September 7, 2017	July 24, 2018	withdrawn by Pres. Trump		Danielle J. Forrest	
Halil Suleyman Ozerden	5th Cir.	June 24, 2019	January 3, 2020	returned to the president		Cory T. Wilson	
Raúl M. Arias-Marxuach	1st Cir.	November 30, 2020	February 4, 2021	withdrawn by Pres. Biden		Gustavo Gelpí	
Lee Rudofsky	8th Cir.	September 14, 2026	November 10, 2026	withdrawn by Pres. Trump		TBD	
District courts
Thomas Farr	E.D.N.C.	July 13, 2017	January 3, 2019	returned to the president		Richard E. Myers II	
Brett Talley	M.D. Ala.	September 7, 2017	January 3, 2018	returned to the president		Andrew L. Brasher	
Jeff Mateer	E.D. Tex.	September 7, 2017	January 3, 2018	returned to the president		Sean D. Jordan	
Matthew S. Petersen	D.D.C.	September 11, 2017	January 3, 2018	returned to the president		Carl J. Nichols	
Gordon P. Giampietro	E.D. Wis.	December 20, 2017	January 4, 2019	returned to the president		Brett H. Ludwig	
John M. O'Connor	E.D. Okla. N.D. Okla. W.D. Okla.	April 10, 2018	January 3, 2019	returned to the president		John F. Heil III	
Jon Katchen	D. Alaska	April 12, 2018	January 3, 2019	returned to the president		Joshua Kindred	
Thomas Marcelle	N.D.N.Y.	November 13, 2018	September 19, 2019	withdrawn by Pres. Trump		Anne M. Nardacci	
Jeremy B. Rosen	C.D. Cal.	November 13, 2018	January 3, 2021	returned to the president		Hernán D. Vera	
Patrick J. Bumatay	S.D. Cal.	February 6, 2019	October 15, 2019	withdrawn by Pres. Trump	9th Cir. (nominated November 13, 2018, confirmed December 10, 2019)	Todd W. Robinson	
Michael S. Bogren	W.D. Mich.	March 11, 2019	June 26, 2019	withdrawn by Pres. Trump		Hala Y. Jarbou	
Kevin R. Sweazea	D.N.M.	June 12, 2019	January 3, 2020	returned to the president		Margaret Strickland	
Barbara Bailey Jongbloed	D. Conn.	October 15, 2019	January 3, 2021	returned to the president		Omar A. Williams	
Cory T. Wilson	S.D. Miss.	October 15, 2019	May 4, 2020	withdrawn by Pres. Trump	5th Cir. (nominated May 4, 2020, confirmed June 24, 2020)	Taylor B. McNeel	
Adam L. Braverman	S.D. Cal.	October 17, 2019	January 3, 2021	returned to the president		Linda Lopez	
Sandy N. Leal	C.D. Cal.	October 17, 2019	January 3, 2021	returned to the president		Maame Ewusi-Mensah Frimpong	
Shireen Matthews	S.D. Cal.	October 17, 2019	January 3, 2021	returned to the president		Jinsook Ohta	
Rick Richmond	C.D. Cal.	October 17, 2019	January 3, 2021	returned to the president		Sherilyn Peace Garnett	
Knut S. Johnson	S.D. Cal.	November 21, 2019	January 3, 2021	returned to the president		Ruth Bermudez Montenegro	
Steve Kim	C.D. Cal.	November 21, 2019	January 3, 2021	returned to the president		Kenly Kiya Kato	
Michelle M. Pettit	S.D. Cal.	November 21, 2019	January 3, 2021	returned to the president		Robert S. Huie	
Jennifer P. Togliatti	D. Nev.	November 21, 2019	January 3, 2021	returned to the president		Cristina D. Silva	
Iris Lan	S.D.N.Y.	December 2, 2019	January 3, 2021	returned to the president		Dale Ho	
Saritha Komatireddy	E.D.N.Y.	May 4, 2020	January 3, 2021	returned to the president		Nusrat Jahan Choudhury	
Jennifer H. Rearden	S.D.N.Y.	May 4, 2020	January 3, 2021	returned to the president	S.D.N.Y. (nominated January 19, 2022, confirmed September 8, 2022)	Herself	
Dirk B. Paloutzian	E.D. Cal.	May 21, 2020	January 3, 2021	returned to the president		Ana de Alba	
Edmund LaCour	M.D. Ala.	June 2, 2020	February 4, 2021	withdrawn by Pres. Biden	N.D. Ala. (nominated August 12, 2025, confirmed October 29, 2025)	Bill Lewis	
James P. Arguelles	E.D. Cal.	June 18, 2020	January 3, 2021	returned to the president		Jennifer L. Thurston	
Fred Joseph Federici III	D.N.M.	June 18, 2020	January 3, 2021	returned to the president		Margaret Strickland	
Brenda M. Saiz	D.N.M.	June 18, 2020	January 3, 2021	returned to the president		Matthew L. Garcia	
Hector Gonzalez	E.D.N.Y.	September 8, 2020	January 3, 2021	returned to the president	E.D.N.Y. (nominated December 15, 2021, confirmed March 23, 2022)	Himself	
Ryan T. McAllister	N.D.N.Y.	September 8, 2020	January 3, 2021	returned to the president		Anne M. Nardacci	
David C. Woll Jr.	E.D.N.Y.	September 8, 2020	January 3, 2021	returned to the president		Nina Morrison	
John M. Guard	M.D. Fla.	June 16, 2025	January 3, 2026	returned to the president		TBD	
Court of International Trade
Joseph Barloon	Intl. Trade	November 16, 2020	February 4, 2021	withdrawn by Pres. Biden		Lisa Wang	
Article I courts
Damien M. Schiff	Fed. Cl.	May 8, 2017	January 3, 2018	returned to the president		Richard Hertling	
Maureen Ohlhausen	Fed. Cl.	January 24, 2018	January 3, 2019	returned to the president		Edward H. Meyers	
Mark V. Holmes	T.C.	April 24, 2018	February 4, 2021	withdrawn by Pres. Biden		Kashi Way	
Daniel Z. Epstein	Fed. Cl.	June 24, 2019	December 17, 2020	withdrawn by Pres. Trump		Armando O. Bonilla	
Grace Obermann	Fed. Cl.	October 30, 2019	February 4, 2021	withdrawn by Pres. Biden		Molly Silfen	
Stephen A. Kubiatowski	Fed. Cl.	October 23, 2020	February 4, 2021	withdrawn by Pres. Biden		Zachary Somers; Carolyn N. Lerner	
Terrence M. Andrews	Fed. Cl.	December 17, 2020	February 4, 2021	withdrawn by Pres. Biden		Armando O. Bonilla	
Article IV courts
Maria Teresa B. Cenzon	D. Guam	November 30, 2020	February 4, 2021	withdrawn by Pres. Biden		TBD	

== Supreme Court ==
=== Confirmed nominees ===
Supreme Court of the United States

- Neil Gorsuch (of Colorado): Trump announced the nomination of Gorsuch on January 31, 2017. The nomination was formally transmitted to the Senate on February 1, 2017. Judge Gorsuch's confirmation hearings started on March 20, 2017, and lasted four days. On April 3, the Judiciary Committee approved Gorsuch by an 11–9 vote. During the last day of committee hearings, Senate Minority Leader Chuck Schumer (D-NY) announced from the Senate floor that he would filibuster the nomination. Democratic opposition focused primarily on the complaint that the vacancy on the court was created by the death of Justice Antonin Scalia during President Barack Obama's administration, and therefore should have been filled by President Obama's nominee for the vacancy, Judge Merrick Garland. In response, Republicans hearkened back to November 2013 when Democrats invoked the nuclear option to fill three vacancies on the United States Court of Appeals for the District of Columbia Circuit. To counter the filibuster, Republicans invoked the nuclear option, ending debate with a simple majority vote and extending the rule that a simple majority could invoke cloture on all presidential nominations, including Supreme Court nominations. The Senate confirmed Gorsuch on April 7, 2017 by a 54–45 vote, with all Senate Republicans present voting to confirm along with three Democratic senators from states that voted heavily for Trump: Senators Joe Manchin (D-WV), Heidi Heitkamp (D-ND), and Joe Donnelly (D-IN).
- Brett Kavanaugh (of Maryland): Trump announced the nomination of Kavanaugh in July 2018. The nomination was formally transmitted to the Senate on July 10, 2018. Widespread opposition to his nomination emerged within the Democratic Caucus after allegations emerged that Kavanaugh had sexually assaulted fellow student Christine Blasey Ford back when he was in high school. The Senate would go on to confirm Kavanaugh on October 6, 2018, by a 50–48 vote. Except for Senator Lisa Murkowski (R-AK), all Senate Republicans voted to confirm Kavanaugh and except for Senator Joe Manchin (D-WV), all Senate Democrats opposed him. Murkowski announced her opposition to Kavanaugh, but instead of voting no, she voted present in order to pair her vote with Senator Steve Daines (R-MT), who was attending his daughter's wedding.
- Amy Coney Barrett (of Indiana): On September 26, 2020, weeks before the 2020 presidential election, Trump nominated Barrett to fill the vacancy left by the death of Justice Ruth Bader Ginsburg. On October 26, 2020, the United States Senate confirmed her nomination by a 52–48 vote. Democrats rebuked Republicans for violating the precedent they established in 2016 when they refused to consider Obama's nomination of Merrick Garland more than nine months before the end of his term. The 35 days between the nomination and the presidential election marked the shortest period of time between a nomination to the Supreme Court and an election in U.S. history.

== Appellate nominees ==
=== Failed nominees ===
==== United States Court of Appeals for the First Circuit ====
- Raúl M. Arias-Marxuach (of Puerto Rico): On November 13, 2020, Trump announced his intent to nominate Arias-Marxuach, a United States district judge for the United States District Court for the District of Puerto Rico, to serve as a United States circuit judge for the United States Court of Appeals for the First Circuit, to the seat vacated by Judge Juan R. Torruella, who died on October 26, 2020; the nomination was sent to the Senate on November 30, 2020. The nomination was considered controversial, as Trump had already lost the 2020 presidential election to Joe Biden when he announced it, although Arias-Marxuach himself was not controversial. Although he received a hearing before the Senate Judiciary Committee on December 16, 2020, no further action on his nomination was taken due to Republican Judiciary Committee chairman Lindsey Graham's opposition to processing the nomination out of committee during the lame-duck session of the 116th Congress. This resulted in the nomination's expiration at the end of the 116th Congress on January 3, 2021, upon which it was returned to the President, pursuant to Rule XXXI, Paragraph 6 of the rules of the Senate; later that same day, his renomination to the same seat was sent to the Senate. However, before the Senate could act upon the nomination and despite the outgoing Trump administration and Graham's attempts to invoke "senatorial courtesy" and recommend to President Biden—who took office on January 20—that he maintain Arias-Marxuach's renomination in the 117th Congress in light of the nominees's qualifications and drawing of bipartisan support, Biden formally withdrew the nomination on February 4, 2021. On May 12, 2021, Biden announced his selection of Gustavo Gelpí, the Chief Judge of the United States District Court for the District of Puerto Rico, for the position, with his nomination being sent to the Senate later that same day; Gelpí was later confirmed on October 18, 2021.

==== United States Court of Appeals for the Fifth Circuit ====
- Halil Suleyman Ozerden (of the Southern District of Mississippi): On June 11, 2019, Trump announced his intent to nominate Ozerden to serve as a United States Circuit Judge for the United States Court of Appeals for the Fifth Circuit. On June 24, 2019, his nomination was sent to the Senate. His nomination ran into opposition from some conservative groups and he faced skepticism from several Republican senators on the Senate Judiciary Committee. On September 12, 2019, Senator Ted Cruz announced his opposition to the nomination. The Judiciary Committee was scheduled to vote on recommending Ozerden on September 26, 2019, but the vote was postponed after Senator Josh Hawley joined Ted Cruz in his opposition to Ozerden's elevation to the Circuit Court. On January 3, 2020, his nomination was returned to the President under Rule XXXI, Paragraph 6 of the Senate. Trump later nominated Cory T. Wilson in Ozerden's place, and Wilson was confirmed on June 24, 2020.

==== United States Court of Appeals for the Ninth Circuit ====
- Ryan Bounds (of Oregon): On September 7, 2017, Trump nominated Bounds, a former Assistant U.S. Attorney, to serve as a United States Circuit Judge of the United States Court of Appeals for the Ninth Circuit, to the seat vacated by Judge Diarmuid O'Scannlain, who assumed senior status on December 31, 2016. A short time later, the state's two Democratic U.S. senators, Ron Wyden and Jeff Merkley, announced that they would blue slip the nomination. They complained that the Trump administration had bypassed a state bipartisan vetting commission and had not consulted them about the nomination. However, the White House Counsel's office produced records stating that they had contacted the state's U.S. senators on multiple occasions, but had gotten little response from them. On January 3, 2018, his nomination was returned to the President under Rule XXXI, Paragraph 6 of the Senate. On January 5, 2018, Trump announced his intent to renominate Bounds to a federal judgeship. On January 8, 2018, his renomination was sent to the Senate. In February 2018, the bipartisan committee cited by the two Senators found Bounds to be qualified. However, the senators subsequently questioned Bounds' fitness on the basis of some of his writings when he was a student at Stanford University in the 1990s. On May 9, 2018, a hearing on his nomination was held before the Senate Judiciary Committee. On June 7, 2018, his nomination was reported out of committee by an 11–10 vote. On July 18, 2018, the United States Senate invoked cloture on his nomination by a 50–49 vote. On July 19, 2018, Senate Majority Leader Mitch McConnell announced that Bounds' nomination would be withdrawn after Senators Tim Scott and Marco Rubio announced they would not support the nomination, meaning there would not be enough votes to confirm Bounds. On July 24, 2018, his nomination was officially withdrawn. Trump later nominated Washington County Judge Danielle J. Forrest in Bounds' place, and Forrest was confirmed on November 6, 2019.

=== Confirmed nominees ===
==== United States Court of Appeals for the Second Circuit ====
- Steven Menashi (of New York): On August 14, 2019, Trump announced his intent to nominate Menashi to serve as a United States Circuit Judge of the United States Court of Appeals for the Second Circuit. On September 9, 2019, his nomination was sent to the Senate. That same day, the American Bar Association (ABA) rated Menashi as "well qualified," its highest rating. During his hearing, Menashi was criticized by senators from both parties for refusing to answer their questions regarding the role he played in shaping the Trump administration's immigration policies. He was also questioned about an article he had written in the University of Pennsylvania Journal of International Law about ethnonationalism and Israel. On November 14, 2019, the United States Senate confirmed his nomination by a 51–41 vote.

==== United States Court of Appeals for the Third Circuit ====
- Emil Bove (of New Jersey): On May 28, 2025, Trump announced his intent to nominate Bove for the appellate court with Bove's name formally sent to the Senate on June 16. During Bove's hearing he was questioned on his professional relationship with Trump, having acted as his personal lawyer in Trump's New York criminal Trial, and having represented him against prosecution for his alleged mishandling of classified documents and attempts to overturn the 2020 presidential election. Further criticism of Bove emerged regarding his actions as United States Deputy Attorney General, where, according to whistleblower Erez Reuveni, he stated that if a court order attempted to prevent the deportation flights of Venezuelans under the Alien Enemies Act, the Department of Justice would consider "telling the courts 'fuck you'" and "ignore any such order." He was similarly criticized for his dissmissal of corruption charges against New York City Mayor Eric Adams, which prompted multiple federal resignations including Danielle Sassoon, the acting United States Attorney for the Southern District of New York, Hagan Scotten, an assistant United States attorney in the district, and five prosecutors associated with the Department of Justice's Public Integrity Section, including John Keller, the acting head of the section, and Kevin Driscoll, who supervised the section as head of the Department of Justice's criminal division. In her resignation letter, Sassoon alleged that Adams's lawyers had proposed a quid pro quo in which Adams would enforce the Trump administration's immigration policies in exchange for his case being dismissed, and that the Department of Justice had acquiesced. His nomination drew further opposition from over seventy-five former state and federal judges and over nine hundred former Department of Justice attorneys. On July 24, the Senate invoked cloture on his nomination in a 50–48 vote, and on July 29 the Senate voted to confirm Bove by a 50–49 vote.

==== United States Court of Appeals for the Fourth Circuit ====
- Allison Jones Rushing (of North Carolina): On August 27, 2018, Trump announced his intent to nominate Rushing to serve as a United States Circuit Judge of the United States Court of Appeals for the Fourth Circuit. Her official nomination was received on the same day by the Senate. She was nominated to the seat to be vacated by Allyson K. Duncan, who had previously announced her decision to assume senior status upon the confirmation of her successor. On October 17, 2018, a hearing on her nomination was held before the Senate Judiciary Committee. During Rushing's confirmation hearing, she was questioned about her ties to the Alliance Defending Freedom (ADF), a conservative Christian group that she had interned for as a law student. ADF has been criticized for opposing LGBT rights. Rushing's defenders pointed out that she had only briefly interned for the group back in 2009 and had little contact with it since. Rushing was asked if she would recuse herself from ADF-related cases if confirmed. She replied: "I would determine the appropriate action with the input of the parties, consultation of these rules and ethical canons, and consultation with my colleagues." Asked about ADF being labeled a "hate group" by the Southern Poverty Law Center, Rushing said: "Hate is wrong, and it should have no place in our society. In my experience with ADF, I have not witnessed anyone expressing or advocating hate." On January 3, 2019, her nomination was returned to Trump under Rule XXXI, Paragraph 6 of the Senate. On January 23, 2019, Trump announced his intent to renominate Rushing for a federal judgeship. Her nomination was sent to the Senate later that day. On February 7, 2019, her nomination was reported out of committee by a 12–10 vote. On March 5, 2019, the United States Senate confirmed Rushing by a 53–44 vote.

==== United States Court of Appeals for the Fifth Circuit ====
- Kyle Duncan (of Louisiana): On September 28, 2017, Trump announced his intent to nominate Duncan to an undetermined seat on the United States Court of Appeals for the Fifth Circuit. On October 2, 2017, he was officially nominated to serve as a United States Circuit Judge of the United States Court of Appeals for the Fifth Circuit, to the seat vacated by Judge W. Eugene Davis, who assumed senior status on December 31, 2016. Duncan's judicial record was attacked by Democrats as being too conservative. Republicans defended him, pointing out his academic and legal achievements and pointing out that he was rated "Well Qualified" by the American Bar Association. Republican Senator John Kennedy withheld his blue slip, stating that Duncan had not lived in Louisiana for years and calling into question his support for Duncan's nomination. On November 29, 2017, a hearing was held on his nomination before the Senate Judiciary Committee. Kennedy was impressed by Duncan's testimony and announced his support the following day. On January 3, 2018, his nomination was returned to the President under Rule XXXI, Paragraph 6 of the United States Senate. On January 5, 2018, Trump announced his intent to renominate Duncan to a federal judgeship. On January 8, 2018, his renomination was sent to the Senate. On January 18, 2018, his nomination was reported out of committee by an 11–10 vote. On April 24, 2018, his nomination was confirmed by a 50–47 vote.
- Cory T. Wilson: On August 28, 2019, Trump announced his intent to nominate Wilson to serve as a United States district judge for the United States District Court for the Southern District of Mississippi. On October 15, 2019, his nomination was sent to the Senate. Trump nominated Wilson to the seat vacated by Judge Louis Guirola Jr., who assumed senior status on March 23, 2018. On January 3, 2020, his nomination was returned to the President under Rule XXXI, Paragraph 6 of the Senate. On January 6, 2020, his renomination was sent to the Senate. A hearing on his nomination before the Senate Judiciary Committee was held on January 8, 2020. During his confirmation hearing, Wilson's past comments on social media about President Barack Obama, Hillary Clinton and Alexandria Ocasio-Cortez were scrutinized, as well as his previous stances as a state legislator regarding abortion, LGBT rights, the Affordable Care Act, and voting rights. On May 4, 2020, Trump withdrew Wilson's nomination to the district court and nominated him to a seat on the United States Court of Appeals for the Fifth Circuit that was vacated by Judge E. Grady Jolly, who assumed senior status on October 3, 2017. On June 24, 2020, his nomination was confirmed by a 52–48 vote. Taylor B. McNeel was later nominated to the district court seat in Wilson's place and subsequently confirmed.

==== United States Court of Appeals for the Sixth Circuit ====
- John K. Bush (of Kentucky): On May 8, 2017, Trump announced that he would nominate prominent Louisville lawyer Bush to the seat on the United States Court of Appeals for the Sixth Circuit vacated by Judge Danny Julian Boggs, who assumed senior status on February 28, 2017. On a questionnaire submitted to the committee, Bush acknowledged that between 2007 and 2016, he had pseudonymously authored approximately 400 blog posts on Elephants in the Bluegrass, a blog founded by his wife, Bridget. His blog posts espoused conservative political views and expressed opposition to gay marriage, the Affordable Care Act, public financing of political campaigns, and the idea of trying terrorists in civilian courts. Bush also compared abortion to slavery, calling the topics "the two greatest tragedies in our country." When questioned about his blogging during his judicial nomination process, Bush said that "my personal views are irrelevant to the position for which I have been nominated" and that "Blogging is a political activity. It is not appropriate to bring politics to the bench." On July 20, 2017, the United States Senate confirmed him by a 51–47 vote.
- Chad Readler (of Ohio): On June 7, 2018, Trump announced his intent to nominate Readler to serve as a United States Circuit Judge of the United States Court of Appeals for the Sixth Circuit. On June 18, 2018, his nomination was sent to the Senate. Trump nominated Readler to the seat being vacated by Judge Deborah L. Cook, who would assume senior status upon confirmation of her successor. In June 2018, U.S. Senator Sherrod Brown said he did not plan to return his blue slip for Readler's nomination, while U.S. Senator Rob Portman said he planned to support Readler's nomination. On October 10, 2018, a hearing on his nomination was held before the Senate Judiciary Committee. During his confirmation hearing, Democrats criticized Readler for having supported a Republican lawsuit aimed at dismantling the Affordable Care Act, including its protections for individuals with pre-existing conditions. On January 3, 2019, his nomination was returned to the President under Rule XXXI, Paragraph 6 of the Senate. He was renominated on January 23, 2019. On February 7, 2019, his nomination was reported out of committee by a 12–10 vote. On March 6, 2019, his nomination was confirmed by a 52–47 vote.

==== United States Court of Appeals for the Seventh Circuit ====
- Michael B. Brennan (of Wisconsin): On August 3, 2017, Trump nominated Brennan, a former Judge on the Milwaukee County Circuit Court, to serve as a United States Circuit Judge of the United States Court of Appeals for the Seventh Circuit, to the seat vacated by Judge Terence T. Evans, who assumed senior status on January 17, 2010. Upon the announcement of his nomination, Senator Ron Johnson supported his nomination. However, Senator Tammy Baldwin criticized Trump for bypassing the bipartisan commission composed to vet potential judicial candidates. She withheld her blue slip, but the nomination proceeded anyway. On January 3, 2018, his nomination was returned to the President under Rule XXXI, Paragraph 6 of the Senate. On January 5, 2018, Trump announced his intent to renominate Brennan to a federal judgeship. On January 8, 2018, his renomination was sent to the Senate. On February 15, 2018, Brennan’s nomination was reported out of committee by an 11–10 vote, over the strenuous objections of Democrats on the committee. On May 10, 2018, his nomination was confirmed by a 49–46 vote.

==== United States Court of Appeals for the Eighth Circuit ====
- L. Steven Grasz (of Nebraska): On August 3, 2017, Trump nominated Grasz to serve as a United States Circuit Judge of the United States Court of Appeals for the Eighth Circuit, to the seat vacated by Judge William J. Riley, who assumed senior status on June 30, 2017. In October 2017, the American Bar Association's Standing Committee on the Federal Judiciary, a nonpartisan entity which rates judicial nominees, unanimously voted to give Grasz a "not qualified" rating for the position. On December 7, 2017, his nomination was reported out of committee by an 11–9 vote. On December 12, 2017, the United States Senate confirmed his nomination by a 50–48 vote; the vote was along party lines with Senators John McCain and Thad Cochran abstaining from the vote.
- David Stras (of Minnesota): On May 8, 2017, Trump nominated Stras, an Associate Justice on the Minnesota Supreme Court, to a seat on the United States Court of Appeals for the Eighth Circuit vacated by Judge Diana E. Murphy who assumed senior status on November 29, 2016. The state's then-junior U.S. Senator, Amy Klobuchar, turned in her blue slip, but on September 5, 2017, Minnesota's then-senior U.S. Senator, Al Franken, announced that he would not return his blue slip for Stras. Franken stated that while he had nothing personally against Stras, the White House had not adequately consulted him about the nomination and added that he wanted to prevent the White House from achieving a "right wing" takeover of the Federal Judiciary. On November 16, Franken was accused of making unwanted sexual advances to a talk show hostess, and that was followed by other similar accusations from other women. On November 29, 2017, a hearing was held on Stras's nomination before the Senate Judiciary Committee. On December 7, Franken announced that he would resign from the Senate effective January 2, 2018. He was replaced by Democrat Tina Smith. On January 3, 2018, Stras's nomination was returned to the President under Rule XXXI, Paragraph 6 of the Senate. On January 5, 2018, Trump announced his intent to renominate Stras to a federal judgeship. On January 8, 2018, his renomination was sent to the Senate. On January 18, 2018, his nomination was reported out of committee by a 13–8 vote. On January 30, 2018, the United States Senate confirmed his nomination by a 56–42 vote.
- Jonathan A. Kobes (of South Dakota): On June 11, 2018, Kobes, a former top aide to U.S. Senator Mike Rounds, was nominated to serve on the United States Court of Appeals for the Eighth Circuit. He quickly drew opposition from liberal interest groups and Democrats, who claimed that some of his prior clients showed ideological bias and that he didn't have enough courtroom experience. Their cause was aided when the American Bar Association rated Kobes as "Unqualified." Republicans denounced the rating, claiming that the lead attorney evaluating nominees for the 8th Circuit was politically motivated and biased. On December 11, 2018, the United States Senate confirmed Kobes by a 51–50 vote, with Vice President Mike Pence casting the tie-breaking vote.
- Justin D. Smith (of Missouri): On March 2, 2026, Smith was nominated to serve on the United States Court of Appeals for the Eighth Circuit. Smith had previously served as the personal lawyer of President Donald Trump, having, alongside future Solicitor General D. John Sauer, successfully crafted the legal arguments that would outline the extent of presidential immunity in Trump v. United States. Additionally, both during and at the time of his federal judicial nomination, Smith was actively representing Trump in his appeal before the Supreme Court regarding Trump's civil verdict of sexual assault against journalist E. Jean Carroll. During his hearing he was questioned on his the extent of his professional relationship with Donald Trump, and, whether having acted as his personal lawyer, he would be capable of having the impartiality necessary for a federal judge. Smith was further questioned regarding his views on whether or not Joe Biden legitimately won the 2020 election, to which Smith responded that "Congress certified Joe Biden as the president." On May 14, 2026, Smith's nomination was reported to the full Senate by a 12–10 party-line vote. On June 11, 2026 the Senate invoked cloture on a 47–43 vote, and on June 15, 2026, his nomination was confirmed by a 48–43 vote. He received his judicial commission on June 18, 2026.

==== United States Court of Appeals for the Ninth Circuit ====
- Eric D. Miller (of Washington): On July 13, 2018, Trump announced his intent to nominate Miller to serve as a United States Circuit Judge of the United States Court of Appeals for the Ninth Circuit. On July 19, 2018, his nomination was sent to the Senate. Trump nominated Miller to the seat vacated by Judge Richard C. Tallman, who assumed senior status on March 3, 2018. Neither of Washington's two U.S. senators, Democrats Maria Cantwell and Patty Murray, returned their blue slips for Miller. On February 7, 2019, his nomination was reported out of committee by a 12–10 vote. On February 26, 2019, the United States Senate confirmed Miller by a 53–46 vote. Miller became the first federal appeals court judge in over a century to be confirmed without support from at least one home state senator.
- Daniel Bress (of California): On January 30, 2019, Trump announced his intent to nominate Bress to serve as a United States Circuit Judge of the United States Court of Appeals for the Ninth Circuit. On February 6, 2019, his nomination was sent to the Senate. He has been nominated to the seat vacated by Alex Kozinski, who retired on December 18, 2017. In May 2019, the confirmation hearing for Bress devolved into a debate about Bress' geographic roots. Bress, a native of Gilroy, California, moved to Washington D.C. approximately ten years ago in order for his wife to pursue her career. On June 20, 2019, his nomination was reported out of committee by a 12–10 vote. On July 9, 2019, the United States Senate confirmed his nomination by a 53–45 vote.
- Patrick J. Bumatay (of California): On October 10, 2018, Trump announced his intent to nominate Bumatay to serve as a United States Circuit Judge of the United States Court of Appeals for the Ninth Circuit. Both U.S. senators from California, Dianne Feinstein and Kamala Harris, announced their opposition to his nomination. On November 13, 2018, his nomination was sent to the Senate. Trump nominated Bumatay to the seat vacated by Judge Alex Kozinski, who retired on December 18, 2017. The decision to move forward with his nomination to the appeals court angered California Senator Dianne Feinstein, the ranking member of the Senate Judiciary Committee. Feinstein claims that she was not consulted about his nomination, he was never mentioned as a potential nominee, and she claimed he had no judicial experience, therefore, she was planning to withhold her blue slip. On January 3, 2019, his nomination was returned to the President under Rule XXXI, Paragraph 6 of the Senate. Trump later nominated Daniel Bress in Bumatay's place, who was subsequently confirmed, while Bumatay was instead nominated to the United States District Court for the Southern District of California to the seat vacated by judge Marilyn L. Huff, who assumed senior status on September 30, 2016. On October 15, 2019, Trump withdrew Bumatay's nomination to the district court and nominated him to the seat being vacated by Carlos Bea, who planned to assume senior status upon the confirmation of his successor. Todd W. Robinson was later nominated to the district court seat in Bumatay's place and subsequently confirmed on September 16, 2020. On November 21, 2019, his nomination was reported out of committee by a 12–10 vote. On December 10, 2019, the United States Senate confirmed his nomination by a 53–40 vote. Bumatay is the first Filipino American to serve as an Article III federal appellate judge. Bumatay is gay and was the second LGBT person to be nominated by Trump to a federal judicial position.
- Lawrence VanDyke (of Nevada): On September 20, 2019, Trump announced his intent to nominate VanDyke to serve as a United States Circuit Judge of the United States Court of Appeals for the Ninth Circuit. Nevada Senators Jacky Rosen and Catherine Cortez Masto, both Democrats, announced their disappointment in the nomination. He was nominated to the seat being vacated by Judge Jay Bybee, who previously announced his intention to assume senior status on December 31, 2019. VanDyke received a "not qualified" rating from the American Bar Association. ABA evaluators conducted 60 anonymous interviews with lawyers, judges, and others who had worked with VanDyke. The ABA published a scathing critique of VanDyke in a letter to the Senate Judiciary Committee; that letter asserted that interviewees described VanDyke as "'arrogant, lazy, an ideologue, and lacking in knowledge of the day-to-day practice'" of law. The ABA added that "'There was a theme that the nominee lacks humility, has an 'entitlement' temperament, does not have an open mind, and does not always have a commitment to being candid and truthful'". The ABA also raised "concerns about whether Mr. VanDyke would be fair to persons who are gay, lesbian, or otherwise part of the LGBTQ community, adding that "Mr. VanDyke would not say affirmatively that he would be fair to any litigant before him, notably members of the LGBTQ community." On October 30, 2019, a hearing on VanDyke's nomination was held before the Senate Judiciary Committee. Most of the two-hour hearing was focused on VanDyke's record on LGBTQ issues. During his confirmation hearing, VanDyke was asked, "Did you say that you wouldn't be fair to members of the LGBTQ community?" VanDyke broke down in tears, denying the accusation: "'I did not say that. I do not believe that. It is a fundamental belief of mine that all people are created in the image of God and they should all be treated with dignity and respect'". Senator Patrick Leahy (D-Vt), questioned VanDyke about an opinion editorial he wrote in 2004 while a student at Harvard Law noting that same-sex marriage may be harmful for children. VanDyke stated that his views had changed since that time. VanDyke said that during a three-hour meeting with the ABA, the ABA evaluator told him that she was in a "hurry" and did not give him the opportunity to fully respond to concerns. The ABA acknowledged that the lead ABA evaluator assigned to VanDyke, Montana attorney Marcia Davenport, contributed $150 to VanDyke's opponent in a 2014 Montana Supreme Court election. On November 21, 2019, his nomination was reported out of committee by a 12–10 vote. On December 11, 2019, his nomination was confirmed by a 51–44 vote.

==== United States Court of Appeals for the Eleventh Circuit ====
- Andrew L. Brasher (of Alabama): On November 6, 2019, Trump announced his intent to nominate Brasher to serve as a United States circuit judge for the United States Court of Appeals for the Eleventh Circuit. On November 21, 2019, his nomination was sent to the Senate. Trump nominated Brasher to the seat to be vacated by Judge Edward Earl Carnes, who previously announced his intention to assume senior status on a date to be determined. A hearing on his nomination before the Senate Judiciary Committee was held on December 4, 2019. On January 3, 2020, his nomination was returned to the President under Rule XXXI, Paragraph 6 of the Senate. Later that day, he was re-nominated to the same seat. The National Urban League and the NAACP urged the Senate to reject his nomination to the Eleventh Circuit. On January 16, 2020, his nomination was reported out of committee by a 12–10 vote. On February 11, 2020, his nomination was confirmed by a 52–43 vote.

== District court nominees ==
=== Failed nominees ===
==== United States District Court for the Middle District of Alabama ====
- Brett Talley: In September 2017, he was nominated by Trump to fill a vacancy on the United States District Court for the Middle District of Alabama. His nomination drew controversy due to his lack of courtroom or judicial experience, partisan personal blogging, and failure to disclose that he was married to Ann Donaldson, the Chief of Staff to White House Counsel Don McGahn. He became the third judicial nominee since 1989 to receive a unanimous rating of "not qualified" from the American Bar Association. On December 13, 2017, Talley withdrew his name from consideration for the appointment. On January 3, 2018, his nomination was returned to the President under Rule XXXI, Paragraph 6 of the Senate. Trump later nominated Andrew L. Brasher in Talley's place, and Brasher was confirmed on May 1, 2019.

==== United States District Court for the District of Alaska ====
- Jon Katchen: On April 10, 2018, Trump announced his intent to nominate Katchen to serve as a United States District Judge of the United States District Court for the District of Alaska. On April 12, 2018, his nomination was sent to the Senate. He was nominated to the seat vacated by Judge Ralph Beistline, who assumed senior status on December 31, 2015. His nomination was referred to the Senate Judiciary Committee. In August 2018, Katchen withdrew his name from consideration, citing the uncertainty of the nomination process and timing. Trump later nominated Joshua Kindred in Katchen's place, and Kindred was confirmed on February 12, 2020.

==== United States District Court for the Eastern District of Texas ====
- Jeff Mateer: On September 7, 2017, Trump nominated Mateer to serve as a United States District Judge of the United States District Court for the Eastern District of Texas, to the seat vacated by Judge Richard A. Schell, who assumed senior status on March 10, 2015. Mateer was recommended to the White House by Senators John Cornyn and Ted Cruz. After Mateer's remarks about transgender kids being part of "Satan's plan" and his support for conversion therapy were publicized in late September 2017, John Cornyn, a Republican Senator from Texas and Senate Majority Whip, expressed skepticism about Mateer's suitability to sit on the federal bench. Cornyn and members of a committee that screens Texas judicial candidates said that Mateer had not disclosed the statements. Senator Cruz said that he still supported Mateer's nomination. On December 14, 2017, Mateer withdrew himself from consideration. On January 3, 2018, his nomination was returned to the President under Rule XXXI, Paragraph 6 of the Senate. Trump later nominated Sean D. Jordan in Mateer's place, and Jordan was confirmed on July 30, 2019.

==== United States District Court for the District of Columbia ====
- Matthew S. Petersen: on September 7, 2017, Trump nominated Federal Election Commissioner Petersen to serve as a United States District Judge of the United States District Court for the District of Columbia, to the seat vacated by Judge Richard W. Roberts, who assumed senior status on March 16, 2016. On December 13, 2017, during his confirmation hearing before the Senate Judiciary Committee Senator John Neely Kennedy (R-LA) questioned Petersen about legal procedure, asking if Petersen knew what the Daubert standard was, and what a motion in limine was. He was unable to answer. Petersen's answers received criticism in the press and from lawmakers. The New York Times described it as one of the "more painful Senate hearings in recent memory." Petersen withdrew himself from consideration on December 16, 2017. On January 3, 2018, his nomination was returned to the President under Rule XXXI, Paragraph 6 of the Senate. Trump later nominated Carl J. Nichols in Petersen's place, and Nichols was confirmed on May 22, 2019.

==== United States District Court for the Northern District of New York ====
- Thomas Marcelle: On October 10, 2018, Trump announced his intent to nominate Marcelle to serve as a Judge of the United States District Court for the Northern District of New York. Marcelle was nominated to the seat on the United States District Court for the Northern District of New York vacated by Judge Gary L. Sharpe, who assumed senior status on January 1, 2016. On November 13, 2018, his nomination was sent to the U.S. Senate. On January 3, 2019, Marcelle's nomination was returned to the President under Rule XXXI, Paragraph 6 of the United States Senate. On January 23, 2019, Trump announced that he had renominated Marcelle. On August 29, 2019, Marcelle had withdrawn his name from consideration after his nomination was blocked by U.S. Sen. Kirsten Gillibrand due to his perceived opposition to abortion. The White House officially withdrew his nomination on September 19, 2019. Trump later nominated Ryan T. McAllister in Marcelle's place.
- Ryan T. McAllister: On August 12, 2020, President Trump announced his intent to nominate McAllister to serve as a United States district judge for the United States District Court for the Northern District of New York. On September 8, 2020, his nomination was sent to the Senate. A former aide to New York Governor George Pataki and Congressman John Faso, McAllister drew attacks from progressives and Democrats, who claimed that his experience was too political in nature and that he couldn't be objective on the bench. McAllister had been nominated after Senator Kirsten Gillibrand had withheld her blue slip consenting to the nomination of Thomas Marcelle to this post. McAllister was a part of a bipartisan package of judicial nominees and at first New York's Democratic U.S. senators, Gillibrand and Chuck Schumer, grudgingly acquiesced to his nomination in exchange for the nominations of Jennifer H. Rearden and Hector Gonzalez. But after the nomination of Amy Coney Barrett to the U.S. Supreme Court shortly before the 2020 presidential election, Schumer and Gillibrand refused to turn in their blue slips in retaliation, leaving his nomination stalled. President Biden nominated Anne M. Nardacci in McAllister’s place and she was confirmed on November 30, 2022.

==== United States District Court for the Eastern District of North Carolina ====
- Thomas Farr: On July 13, 2017, Trump nominated Farr to serve as a United States District Judge of the United States District Court for the Eastern District of North Carolina, to the seat vacated by Judge Malcolm Jones Howard, who assumed senior status on December 31, 2005. On September 20, 2017, a hearing on his nomination was held before the Senate Judiciary Committee. On October 19, 2017, his nomination was reported out of committee by an 11–9 vote. On January 3, 2018, his nomination was returned to the President under Rule XXXI, Paragraph 6 of the Senate. On January 5, 2018, Trump announced his intent to renominate Farr to a federal judgeship. On January 8, 2018, his renomination was sent to the Senate. On January 18, 2018, his nomination was reported out of committee by an 11–10 vote. On November 28, 2018, the Senate invoked cloture on his nomination by a 51–50 vote, with Vice President Mike Pence casting the tie-breaking vote. The following day, Republican senators Jeff Flake of Arizona and Tim Scott of South Carolina opposed to his nomination, joined all 49 Democratic senators who opposed his nomination as well, all assuring that his nomination will be rejected. Farr's nomination was opposed by the Congressional Black Caucus due to Farr's role as a lawyer defending North Carolina voting restrictions which were struck down by a court as racially biased. During his Senate confirmation hearing, Farr said that he disagreed with the 4th Circuit panel's ruling and that "at the time our clients enacted those laws, I do not believe that they thought that were purposefully discriminating against African Americans." He said that if he is confirmed to the federal judiciary, he would follow the 4th Circuit's ruling. In 2019, the White House did not renominate Farr. Trump later nominated Richard E. Myers II in Farr's place, and Myers was confirmed on December 5, 2019.

==== United States District Court for the Eastern District of Wisconsin ====
- Gordon P. Giampietro: On December 20, 2017, Trump nominated Giampietro to serve as a United States District Judge of the United States District Court for the Eastern District of Wisconsin, to the seat vacated by Judge Rudolph T. Randa, who assumed senior status on February 5, 2016. On February 15, 2018, the web site BuzzFeed reported that Giampietro had made negative remarks about "calls for diversity", birth control, and gay marriage in blog comments and radio interviews. A spokesman for U.S. Senator Tammy Baldwin called the statements "extremely troubling" and complained that they had not been provided to the Wisconsin Federal Nominating Commission, a bipartisan commission which vets federal judicial nominees. In response, Giampietro released his application to the Wisconsin federal nominating commission, which shows what questions he was asked by the state's federal nominating commission and the answers that he provided. Giampietro's supporters, including the Catholic League, have said they believe criticisms of his past comments have to do with his Catholic faith. In response, Baldwin withheld her blue slip. In 2019, the White House did not renominate him. Trump later nominated Brett H. Ludwig in Giampietro's place, and Ludwig was confirmed on September 9, 2020.

==== Northern, Eastern, and Western Districts of Oklahoma ====
- John M. O'Connor: On April 10, 2018, Trump nominated O'Connor to serve as a United States District Judge for the United States District Courts of Northern, Eastern, and Western districts of Oklahoma. He was nominated to the seat vacated by Judge James H. Payne, who assumed senior status on August 1, 2017. On July 11, 2018, a hearing on his nomination was held before the Senate Judiciary Committee. During his hearings Senator Kamala Harris said the Judiciary Committee should not have moved forward with O'Connor's nomination before the ABA released its rating. On August 21, 2018, the American Bar Association rated O'Connor "not qualified." Two complaints about O'Connor had been filed with the Oklahoma Bar Association, although neither complaint resulted in public discipline and he remains an attorney in good standing. He was not renominated in 2019, and withdrew his name for consideration for re-nomination on April 12, 2019. Trump later nominated John F. Heil III in O'Connor's place, and Heil was confirmed on May 20, 2020.

==== United States District Court for the Western District of Michigan ====
- Michael S. Bogren: On March 8, 2019, Trump agreed to nominate Borgen as a Federal Trial Judge at the urging of U.S. Senators Debbie Stabenow and Gary Peters. However, his nomination drew criticism from Republicans and conservatives. A particular point of contention was when Bogren represented the city of East Lansing, which barred two married Christian farmers from selling their goods at the local farmers' market because after they refused to a host a same-sex marriage on their farm citing religious beliefs. While making his case, Bogren equated the farmers to the Ku Klux Klan and radical Muslims who oppose letting women drive. While Bogren claimed he was merely defending his client, his critics said his remarks went far beyond the bounds of fair comment and showed anti-Christian bias, thus proving that he did not have the temperament to judge cases impartially. On June 11, 2019, Bogren withdrew his nomination. The White House formally sent a notice of the withdrawal of Bogren's nomination to the Senate on June 26, 2019. Trump later nominated Oakland County Circuit Court Judge Hala Y. Jarbou in Bogren's place, and Jarbou was confirmed on September 10, 2020.

==== United States District Court for the District of New Mexico ====
- Kevin R. Sweazea: On May 29, 2019, Trump announced his intent to nominate Sweazea to serve as a United States district judge for the United States District Court for the District of New Mexico. On June 12, 2019, his nomination was sent to the Senate. Trump nominated Sweazea to the seat vacated by Judge Robert C. Brack, who assumed senior status on July 25, 2018. On October 29, 2019 it was announced that Sweazea withdrew his nomination after New Mexico's two senators, Tom Udall and Martin Heinrich, withdrew their initial support for him. His nomination was returned on January 3, 2020. Trump later nominated Fred Joseph Federici III in Sweazea's place.
- Fred Joseph Federici III: On May 28, 2020, President Trump announced his intent to nominate Federici to serve as a United States District Judge for the United States District Court for the District of New Mexico, after being recommended by a bipartisan commission set up by New Mexico's two U.S. senators. On June 18, 2020, his nomination was sent to the Senate. A career federal lawyer with 25 years of experience, Federici drew no controversy. But in mid-September 2020, both senators, Tom Udall and Martin Heinrich, withdrew their blue slips to protest the pre-election hearings of Amy Coney Barrett to the U.S. Supreme Court weeks before the November 2020 general elections. President Biden later nominated Margaret Strickland and she was confirmed on September 21, 2021.
- Brenda M. Saiz: On May 28, 2020, President Trump announced his intent to nominate Saiz to serve as a United States District Judge for the United States District Court for the District of New Mexico. On June 18, 2020, her nomination was sent to the Senate. President Trump nominated Saiz to the seat vacated by Judge Judith C. Herrera, who assumed senior status on July 1, 2019. An experienced lawyer specializing in trucking and railroad law, Said was unanimously rated "well-qualified" by the American Bar Association and drew no controversy. But in mid-September 2020, both senators, Tom Udall and Martin Heinrich, withdrew the blue slips to protest the pre-election hearings of Amy Coney Barrett to the U.S. Supreme Court weeks before the November 2020 general elections. President Biden later nominated Matthew L. Garcia and he was confirmed on February 14, 2023.

==== United States District Court for the Central District of California ====
- Jeremy B. Rosen: On October 10, 2018, President Trump announced his intent to nominate Rosen to serve as a United States District Judge for the United States District Court for the Central District of California. Democrats claimed that Rosen was a conservative ideologue. Rosen's supporters pointed out that he is a well-regarded appellate lawyer and that many Democrats in the California legal community support him. On November 13, 2018, his nomination was sent to the Senate. Senator Kamala Harris refused to turn in her blue slip consenting to the nomination. His nomination was returned at the end of the 116th United States Congress. President Joe Biden later nominated Judge Hernán D. Vera in Rosen's place and he was confirmed on June 13, 2023.
- Rick Richmond: On August 28, 2019, President Trump announced his intent to nominate Richmond to serve as a United States District Judge for the United States District Court for the Central District of California. On October 17, 2019, his nomination was sent to the Senate. The nomination was objected to by progressives, noting his longtime membership in the Federalist Society and his past contributions to Republicans seeking elective office. U.S. Senator Kamala Harris withheld her blue slip from the nomination, leaving his nomination stalled. His nomination was returned at the end of the 116th United States Congress. President Joe Biden later nominated Judge Sherilyn Peace Garnett in Richmond's place and she was confirmed on April 27, 2022.
- Sandy N. Leal: On August 28, 2019, President Trump announced his intent to nominate Orange County Superior Court Judge Leal to serve as a United States District Judge for the United States District Court for the Central District of California. Her nomination was part of a bipartisan package of nominees which included Shireen Matthews, who was recommended by Senator Kamala Harris. On October 17, 2019, her nomination was sent to the Senate. President Trump nominated Leal to the seat vacated by Judge Christina A. Snyder, who assumed senior status on November 23, 2016. Leal's nomination drew no strong objections, but Senator Kamala Harris refused to submit her blue slip consenting to the nomination, leaving it stalled. His nomination was returned at the end of the 116th United States Congress. President Joe Biden later nominated Los Angeles County Superior Court Judge Maame Ewusi-Mensah Frimpong in Leal's place and she was confirmed on December 17, 2021.
- Steve Kim: On November 21, 2019, President Trump announced his intent to nominate Magistrate Judge Steve Kim to serve as a United States District Judge for the United States District Court for the Central District of California. Kim was nominated to succeed Judge Beverly Reid O'Connell, who died on October 8, 2017. Kim was nominated as part of a bipartisan package of nominees including John W. Holcomb, Michelle M. Pettit, and Todd W. Robinson. A registered Democrat with an apolitical reputation and experience in technology and forensics law, Kim generated no controversy and was considered a consensus nominee. On February 13, 2020, his nomination was sent to the Senate. However, California's two Democratic U.S. Senators withdrew their blue slip to protest the nomination of Amy Coney Barrett to the U.S. Supreme Court. On January 3, 2021, his nomination was returned to the President under Rule XXXI, Paragraph 6 of the United States Senate.

==== United States District Court for the Eastern District of California ====
- Dirk B. Paloutzian: On April 29, 2020, President Trump announced his intent to nominate Paloutzian to serve as a United States District Judge for the United States District Court for the Eastern District of California. On May 21, 2020, his nomination was sent to the United States Senate. He received a rating of "well qualified" from the American Bar Association and drew no strong objections, but Senator Kamala Harris refused to submit a blue slip consenting to the nomination, leaving it stalled. His nomination was returned at the end of the 116th United States Congress. President Joe Biden later nominated Ana de Alba in Paloutzian's place and she was confirmed on June 21, 2022.
- James P. Arguelles: On June 8, 2020, President Trump announced his intent to nominate Sacramento County Superior Court Judge Arguelles to serve as a United States District Judge for the United States District Court for the Eastern District of California. On June 18, 2020, his nomination was sent to the Senate. Arguelles did not generate any strong objections, but Senator Kamala Harris refused to submit a blue slip consenting to the nomination, leaving it stalled. His nomination was returned at the end of the 116th United States Congress. President Joe Biden later nominated Judge Jennifer L. Thurston in Arguelles' place and she was confirmed on December 17, 2021.

==== United States District Court for the Southern District of California ====
- Adam L. Braverman: On August 28, 2019, President Trump announced his intent to nominate former U.S. Attorney Braverman to serve as a United States district judge for the United States District Court for the Southern District of California. On October 17, 2019, his nomination was sent to the U.S. Senate. His nomination drew condemnation from progressives, who condemned him for implementing the zero-tolerance policy towards illegal aliens ordered by then-Attorney General Jeff Sessions. Others attacked Braverman for pursuing federal marijuana-related cases, even in jurisdictions where they were legal under state laws. Braverman and his supporters claimed he was just following the law. In response, U.S. Senator Kamala Harris refused to turn in her blue slip consenting to the nomination, leaving it stalled. His nomination was returned at the end of the 116th United States Congress. President Joe Biden later nominated Federal Magistrate Judge Linda Lopez and she was confirmed on December 17, 2021.
- Shireen Matthews: On August 28, 2019, President Trump announced his intent to nominate Matthews to serve as a United States district judge for the United States District Court for the Southern District of California. On October 17, 2019, her nomination was sent to the Senate. President Trump nominated Matthews to the seat vacated by Judge Barry Ted Moskowitz, who assumed senior status on January 23, 2019. Matthews was nominated as part of a bipartisan package of nominees which included Adam Braverman and Rick Richmond. A registered Democrat and former Federal prosecutor with an apolitical record, she personally generated no controversy. However, Senators Dianne Feinstein and Kamala Harris withdrew support for the package in late 2020 to protest the nomination of Amy Coney Barrett to the U.S. Supreme Court shortly before the 2020 general elections, so the Senate never voted on her nomination. President Joe Biden later nominated Jinsook Ohta in Matthews' place and she was confirmed on December 17, 2021.

==== United States District Court for the Eastern District of New York ====
- David C. Woll Jr.: On August 12, 2020, President Trump announced his intent to nominate Woll to serve as a United States District Judge for the United States District Court for the Eastern District of New York. On September 8, 2020, his nomination was sent to the Senate. Woll immediately drew opposition. In 2007, Woll had been one of the attorneys hired by DOJ attorney Monica Goodling as part of a politicized hiring process she conducted, though he personally wasn't accused of wrongdoing. He also worked at the HUD, and was accused of improperly withholding aid to Puerto Rico after a hurricane and failing to comply with a congressional subpoena on the topic on schedule. In response, New York's U.S. senators, Chuck Schumer and Kirsten Gillibrand, refused to turn in blue slips consenting to his nomination. His nomination was returned at the end of the 116th United States Congress. President Joe Biden later nominated Nina Morrison in Woll's place, who was confirmed on June 8, 2022.
- Saritha Komatireddy: On February 12, 2020, President Trump announced his intent to nominate Komatireddy to serve as a United States District Judge for the United States District Court for the Eastern District of New York. Komatireddy was nominated as part of a bipartisan package of nominees which included Jennifer H. Rearden. A career Justice Department lawyer, Komatireddy drew no strong objections. But after President Trump nominated Amy Coney Barrett for the U.S. Supreme Court shortly before the 2020 Presidential election, New York's two Democratic U.S. senators, Chuck Schumer and Kirsten Gillibrand, withdrew their blue slips for Komatireddy and some of Trump's other nominees for New York. Her nomination was returned at the end of the 116th United States Congress. President Joe Biden later nominated Nusrat Jahan Choudhury in Komatireddy's place and she was confirmed on June 15, 2023.

==== United States District Court for the Southern District of New York ====
- Iris Lan: On November 6, 2019, President Trump announced his intent to nominate Lan to serve as a United States district judge for the United States District Court for the Southern District of New York. On December 2, 2019, her nomination was sent to the U.S. Senate, and on January 3, 2020, it was returned to the Senate per normal protocol. A well-respected justice department lawyer with an apolitical record, Lan was unanimously rated as "Well-Qualified" by the American Bar Association, and considered a consensus nominee. On May 4, 2020, her renomination was sent to the Senate, along with the nomination of two other New York City-area District Judge nominees, Jennifer Rearden and Saritha Komatireddy, the president's intention to nominate both of whom was announced on February 12, 2020, to create a package for blue-slip consideration. However, in light of the Presidential election, the New York Senators stopped returning blue slips for nominees, stalled these nominations. Her nomination was returned at the end of the 116th United States Congress. On September 30, 2021, President Biden nominated the controversial Dale Ho in Lan's place and he was narrowly confirmed on June 14, 2023.
- Jennifer H. Rearden: On February 12, 2020, President Trump announced his intent to nominate Rearden to serve as a United States district judge for the United States District Court for the Southern District of New York. She was strongly recommended by U.S. Senator Kirsten Gillibrand and the White House nominated her as part of a bipartisan package of nominees. On May 4, 2020, her nomination was sent to the Senate. President Trump nominated Rearden to the seat vacated by Judge Richard J. Sullivan, who was elevated to the United States Court of Appeals for the Second Circuit on October 25, 2018. However, after the nomination of Amy Coney Barrett to the U.S. Supreme Court, Gillibrand and Chuck Schumer withdrew their support for the Republican nominees in the package in protest, so the Republican-controlled Senate did not act on Readen's nomination. Her nomination was returned at the end of the 116th United States Congress. On January 19, 2022, she was renominated to the same seat by President Biden and was confirmed on September 8, 2022.

=== Confirmed nominees ===
==== United States District Court for the Western District of Tennessee ====
- Mark Norris: On July 13, 2017, Trump nominated Norris to the United States District Court for the Western District of Tennessee, to the seat vacated by Judge J. Daniel Breen, who assumed senior status on March 18, 2017. Prior to his appointment, Norris was publicly considering a candidacy for governor of Tennessee in 2018. Trump's nomination of Norris was supported by Republican Senators Lamar Alexander and Bob Corker of Tennessee, but criticized by former U.S. District Judge Shira Scheindlin, who described Norris as one of a number of "the least qualified and most bizarre" of Trump's judicial appointments. In a New York Times op-ed, Scheindlin criticized Norris for suggesting that "being Muslim is synonymous with being a terrorist" and for leading efforts to bar local governments from removing public monuments to the Confederacy. On November 1, 2017, a hearing on his nomination was held before the Senate Judiciary Committee. During the hearing, Norris said in response to a question from Senator Amy Klobuchar that he viewed the case Obergefell v. Hodges (determining that same-sex couples have a constitutional right to marry) as settled law. On December 7, 2017 his nomination was reported out of committee by an 11–9 vote. On January 3, 2018, his nomination was returned to the President under Rule XXXI, Paragraph 6 of the Senate. On January 5, 2018, Trump announced his intent to renominate Norris to a federal judgeship. On January 8, 2018, his renomination was sent to the Senate. On January 18, 2018, his nomination was reported out of committee by an 11–10 vote. On October 11, 2018, the United States Senate confirmed his nomination was confirmed by a 51–44 vote.

==== United States District Court for the Western District of Oklahoma ====
- Patrick Wyrick: On April 10, 2018, Trump nominated Wyrick, an Oklahoma Supreme Court justice, to serve as a United States District Judge of the United States District Court for the Western District of Oklahoma. He was nominated to the seat vacated by Judge David Lynn Russell, who assumed senior status on July 7, 2013. On May 23, 2018, a hearing on his nomination was held before the Senate Judiciary Committee, and Democratic Senator Sheldon Whitehouse questioned him about an exchange he had with U.S. Supreme Court Justice Sonia Sotomayor during a 2015 death penalty case before the court. On June 14, 2018, his nomination was reported out of committee by an 11–10 vote. On January 3, 2019, his nomination was returned to the President under Rule XXXI, Paragraph 6 of the Senate. On February 7, 2019, his nomination was reported out of committee by a 12–10 vote. On April 9, 2019, he was confirmed by a 53–47 vote.

==== United States District Court for the Eastern District of Texas ====
- J. Campbell Barker: On January 23, 2018, Trump nominated Barker to the seat on the United States District Court for the Eastern District of Texas vacated by Judge Leonard Davis, who retired on May 15, 2015. On May 9, 2018, a hearing on his nomination was held before the Senate Judiciary Committee. On June 7, his nomination was reported out of committee by an 11–10 vote. Opponents of Campbell's nomination included the Leadership Conference on Civil and Human Rights and Democratic Senator Chris Coons. On January 3, 2019, his nomination was returned to the President under Rule XXXI, Paragraph 6 of the Senate. On January 23, 2019, Trump announced his intent to renominate Barker for a federal judgeship. His nomination was sent to the Senate later that day. On February 7, 2019, his nomination was reported out of committee by a 12–10 vote. On May 1, 2019, the United States Senate confirmed him by a 51–47 vote.
- Michael J. Truncale: On January 23, 2018, Trump nominated Truncale to the seat on the United States District Court for the Eastern District of Texas vacated by Judge Ron Clark, who assumed senior status on February 28, 2018. On April 25, 2018 a hearing on his nomination was held before the Senate Judiciary Committee. On May 24, 2018 his nomination was reported out of committee by an 11–10 vote. Under questioning by Democratic U.S. Senator Mazie Hirono, Truncale, who previously served as an election judge in Texas, said he had personally witnessed incidents of voter fraud. Hirono challenged him, saying that she did not believe the problem of voter fraud to be widespread. On January 3, 2019, his nomination was returned to the President under Rule XXXI, Paragraph 6 of the Senate. On January 23, 2019, Trump announced his intent to renominate Truncale for a federal judgeship. His nomination was sent to the Senate later that day. On February 7, 2019, his nomination was reported out of committee by a 12–10 vote. On May 14, 2019, his nomination was confirmed by the Senate in a 49–46 vote. Senator Mitt Romney voted against him because he called Barack Obama an "un-American imposter" in 2011. Truncale said he was "merely expressing frustration by what I perceived as a lack of overt patriotism on behalf of President Obama.'"

==== United States District Court for the Eastern District of Louisiana ====
- Wendy Vitter: On January 23, 2018, Trump nominated Vitter to the seat on the United States District Court for the Eastern District of Louisiana vacated by Judge Helen Ginger Berrigan, who assumed senior status on August 23, 2016. On April 11, 2018, a hearing on her nomination was held before the Senate Judiciary Committee. During her hearing before the Judiciary Committee, Vitter was questioned closely by Democrats about her previous anti-abortion and anti-birth control advocacy. In her position as general counsel of the Roman Catholic Archdiocese of New Orleans, Vitter had promoted unsubstantiated claims about health dangers linked to the birth control pill. During her Senate hearing, Vitter distanced herself from these claims and promised to uphold Roe v. Wade. On January 3, 2019, her nomination was returned to the President under Rule XXXI, Paragraph 6 of the Senate. On January 23, 2019, Trump announced his intent to renominate Vitter for a federal judgeship. Her nomination was sent to the Senate later that day. On February 7, 2019, her nomination was reported out of committee by a 12–10 vote. On May 16, 2019, her nomination was confirmed by a 52–45 vote.

==== United States District Court for the District of Utah ====
- Howard C. Nielson Jr.: On September 28, 2017, Trump nominated Nielson to serve as a United States District Judge of the United States District Court for the District of Utah, to the seat vacated by Judge Ted Stewart, who assumed senior status on September 1, 2014. A hearing on his nomination before the Senate Judiciary Committee was held on January 10, 2018. On February 8, the Judiciary Committee voted for Nielson by an 11–10 vote. Democrats on the committee opposed Nielson over his role in defending California's Proposition 8 and his role in reviewing two torture memos in 2004 and 2006 when he was serving as a deputy assistant general at the Office of Legal Counsel for the Justice Department. Nielson claimed that he was a junior counsel in the Proposition 8 controversy and the lead counsel made decisions on legal tactics. On March 6, 2018, Senator Tammy Duckworth put a hold on his nomination. On January 3, 2019, his nomination was returned to the President under Rule XXXI, Paragraph 6 of the Senate. On January 23, 2019, Trump announced his intent to renominate Nielson for a federal judgeship. His nomination was sent to the Senate later that day. On February 7, 2019, his nomination was reported out of committee by a 12–10 vote. On May 22, 2019, his nomination was confirmed by a 51–47 vote.

==== United States District Court for the Eastern District of Missouri ====
- Stephen R. Clark: On April 10, 2018, Trump announced his intent to nominate Clark to serve as a United States District Judge of the United States District Court for the Eastern District of Missouri. On April 12, 2018, his nomination was sent to the Senate. He was nominated to the seat vacated by Judge Carol E. Jackson, who retired on August 31, 2017. On July 11, 2018, a hearing on his nomination was held before the Senate Judiciary Committee. On September 13, 2018, his nomination was reported out of committee by an 11–10 vote. Democrats have opposed his nomination due to disagreements with Clark's positions on abortion and LGBT rights. Clark stated that his statements on sensitive issues were his personal opinions and that as a judge he would follow the law and Supreme Court precedent. Republicans also pointed out that he was supported by U.S. Senator Claire McCaskill, a Democrat from Clark's home state. On January 3, 2019, his nomination was returned to the President under Rule XXXI, Paragraph 6 of the Senate. On January 23, 2019, Trump announced his intent to renominate Clark for a federal judgeship. His nomination was sent to the Senate later that day. On February 7, 2019, his nomination was reported out of committee by a 12–10 vote. On May 22, 2019, his nomination was confirmed by a 53–45 vote.
- Sarah Pitlyk: On August 14, 2019, Trump announced his intent to nominate Pitlyk to serve as a United States district judge for the United States District Court for the Eastern District of Missouri. On September 9, 2019, her nomination was sent to the Senate. Trump nominated Pitlyk to the seat vacated by Judge Catherine D. Perry, who assumed senior status on December 31, 2018. On September 24, 2019, the American Bar Association (ABA) rated Pitlyk as "Not Qualified." The ABA said Pitlyk's rating was based on her lack of trial experience. The ABA's rating drew criticism and charges of ideological bias from several Republican senators. Pitlyk said one reason for her somewhat limited experience in trial and deposition work is that she has been a member of legal teams that have allowed her to arrange her schedule in order to spend more time with her children. On September 25, 2019, a hearing on her nomination was held before the Senate Judiciary Committee. At the hearing, Democratic Senator Dick Durbin expressed concerns about Pitlyk's lack of trial experience, and other Democratic senators including Richard Blumenthal asked her about her views on abortion; she responded that her personal views would not affect her work as a judge. As a lawyer, Pitlyk had argued that frozen embryos from in vitro fertilization should legally be considered human beings, and she wrote an amicus brief stating that "surrogacy has grave effects on society." On October 31, 2019, her nomination was reported out of committee by a party-line 12–10 vote. On December 3, 2019, the United States Senate invoked cloture on her nomination by a 50–43 vote, with Maine senator Susan Collins voted against her nomination. On December 4, 2019, her nomination was confirmed by a 49–44 vote.

==== United States District Court for the Northern District of Texas ====
- Matthew J. Kacsmaryk: On September 7, 2017, Trump nominated Kacsmaryk to serve as a United States District Judge of the United States District Court for the Northern District of Texas, to the seat vacated by Judge Mary Lou Robinson, who assumed senior status on February 3, 2016. On December 13, 2017 a hearing on his nomination was held before the Senate Judiciary Committee. On January 3, 2018 his nomination was returned to the President under Rule XXXI, Paragraph 6 of the Senate. On January 5, 2018, Trump announced his intent to renominate Kacsmaryk to a federal judgeship. On January 8, 2018, his renomination was sent to the Senate. On January 18, 2018 his nomination was reported out of committee by an 11–10 vote. Senate Democrats oppose his nomination due to his writings and negative comments on LGBT rights and women's contraceptive rights. On January 3, 2019, his nomination was once again returned to the President. On January 23, 2019, Trump announced his intent to renominate Kacsmaryk for a federal judgeship. His nomination was sent to the Senate later that day. On February 7, 2019, his nomination was reported out of committee by a 12–10 vote. On June 18, 2019, the United States Senate invoked cloture on his nomination by a 52–44 vote. On June 19, 2019, his nomination was confirmed by a 52–46 vote.

==== United States District Court for the Middle District of Florida ====
- Kathryn Kimball Mizelle: On August 12, 2020, President Donald Trump announced his intent to nominate Mizelle to serve as a United States district judge of the United States District Court for the Middle District of Florida. On September 8, 2020, her nomination was sent to the Senate to fill the seat vacated by Judge Virginia M. Hernandez Covington, who assumed senior status on July 12, 2020. The American Bar Association rated Mizelle "Not Qualified" to serve as a federal trial court judge, noting that "Since her admission to the bar Ms. Mizelle has not tried a case, civil or criminal, as lead or co-counsel." She was the 8th Trump appointee to the federal bench rated as "Not Qualified" by the ABA's Standing Committee on the Federal Judiciary. Before her appointment, the nominee had only taken part in two trials — both one-day trials in a state court conducted while she was still in law school. According to the ABA, Mizelle had roughly five years of trial experience at the time of her nomination; the ABA typically requires twelve years in order to give a nominee a rating of "Qualified". The ABA conceded that Mizelle "has a very keen intellect, a strong work ethic and an impressive resume ... her integrity and demeanor are not in question." But, the committee wrote, "These attributes...simply do not compensate for the short time she has actually practiced law and her lack of meaningful trial experience." At the age of 33, she is the youngest judge chosen by Trump for a lifetime appointment. On September 9, 2020, a hearing on her nomination was held before the Senate Judiciary Committee. On October 22, 2020, her nomination was reported out of committee by a 12–0 vote, with all Democratic senators boycotting it. On November 18, 2020, her nomination was confirmed by a 49–41 vote. She joined the first group of confirmed judicial appointments tendered by a president who has lost reelection since 1896, with the single exception of Jimmy Carter's appointment of Stephen Breyer to the First Circuit Court of Appeals in November 1980. Breyer had been confirmed by an 80–10 vote.

==== United States District Court for the Northern District of Ohio ====
- J. Philip Calabrese: On February 26, 2020, President Trump announced his intent to nominate Calabrese to serve as a United States District Judge for the United States District Court for the Northern District of Ohio. On March 3, 2020, his nomination was sent to the Senate. A Judge for the Cuyahoga County Court of Common Pleas and formerly a successful lawyer at a prominent Cleveland, Ohio law firm, Calabrese was not expected to be controversial. But he came under fire from animal rights groups and some progressives for doing legal work for Cavel International Inc., the last horse slaughterhouse in the United States, in seeking to block Illinois regulations that would have shut down the business. Calabrese drew even more criticism for representing CEO of the Ohio coal company Murray Energy, which sued the Chagrin Valley Times, a local newspaper, for a defamation after it criticized Murray for firing 156 employees. A federal appeals court found the lawsuit constituted legal harassment, though Calabrese was not personally accused of wrongdoing. A hearing on his nomination before the Senate Judiciary Committee was held on July 29, 2020, and many senators were not impressed with his testimony. On September 17, 2020, his nomination was reported out of committee by a 12–10 vote. On December 1, 2020, his nomination was confirmed by a 58–35 vote.

== Article I court nominees ==
=== Confirmed nominees ===
==== United States Court of Federal Claims ====
- Stephen S. Schwartz: on June 7, 2017, President Trump nominated Washington, D.C., lawyer Schwartz to serve as a United States Judge of the United States Court of Federal Claims, to the seat vacated by Judge Lynn J. Bush, who assumed senior status on October 21, 2013. On July 25, 2017, the Senate Judiciary Committee held a hearing on his nomination. Democrats criticized him, claiming that Schwartz did not have enough courtroom experience to serve as a judge. His nomination was reported out of committee by a 11–9 vote on September 14, 2017. On January 3, 2018, his nomination was returned to the President under Rule XXXI, Paragraph 6 of the United States Senate. On January 8, 2018, the White House renominated 21 of 26 federal judicial nominees who had been returned by the U.S. Senate. Schwartz was not among the 21 individuals who were renominated. David A. Tapp was nominated instead in Schwartz's place and subsequently confirmed. On October 2, 2019, Trump announced his intent to nominate Schwartz to another vacancy on that court. On October 17, 2019, his nomination was sent to the Senate. President Trump nominated Schwartz to the seat on the United States Court of Federal Claims vacated by Judge Marian Blank Horn, who assumed senior status on March 9, 2018. On January 3, 2020, his nomination was returned to the President under Rule XXXI, Paragraph 6 of the Senate. On January 9, 2020, he was renominated to the same seat. On May 14, 2020, his nomination was reported out of committee by a 12–10 vote. On December 7, 2020, the Senate invoked cloture on his nomination by a 48–46 vote. On December 8, 2020, his nomination was confirmed by a 49–47 vote.

=== Failed nominees ===
==== United States Court of Federal Claims ====
- Damien M. Schiff: on May 8, 2017, Trump nominated Schiff, an attorney at the Pacific Legal Foundation, to serve as a United States Judge of the United States Court of Federal Claims, to the seat vacated by Judge George W. Miller, who retired in 2013. Schiff became controversial because of his lack of experience with the specific court. But he became the subject of negative publicity when it was revealed that he described U.S. Supreme Court Associate Justice Anthony Kennedy as a "judicial prostitute" in a blog posting he wrote in 2007. On July 13, 2017, his nomination was reported out of committee by an 11–9 vote. However, some Republican senators implied that they would oppose him on the floor. On January 3, 2018, his nomination was returned to the President under Rule XXXI, Paragraph 6 of the United States Senate. The White House did not renominate Schiff in 2018. Trump later nominated Richard Hertling in Schiff's place, and Hertling was confirmed on June 10, 2019.
- Maureen Ohlhausen: On January 23, 2018, Trump announced his intent to nominate Federal Trade Commissioner Ohlhausen to the United States Court of Federal Claims. On January 24, 2018, her nomination was sent to the Senate. She was nominated to the seat vacated by Judge Lawrence J. Block, who retired on January 8, 2016. Her nomination immediately drew opposition from Democrats, who attacked her opposition to Net Neutrality and portrayed her as reflexively pro-corporation. On May 9, 2018, a hearing on her nomination was held before the Senate Judiciary Committee. On June 7, 2018, her nomination was reported out of committee by an 11–10 vote. In December 2018, Ohlhausen announced that she had withdrawn her nomination for the federal judiciary, opting instead to join the law firm of Baker Botts as partner and co-chair of the firm's antitrust practice. Trump later nominated Edward H. Meyers in Ohlhausen's place, and Meyers was confirmed on September 22, 2020.

== See also ==
- List of federal judges appointed by Donald Trump
- Donald Trump Supreme Court candidates
- United States federal judge
- Judicial appointment history for United States federal courts
- Deaths of United States federal judges in active service
