= Richard J. Sullivan =

American judge (born 1964)

Richard Sullivan
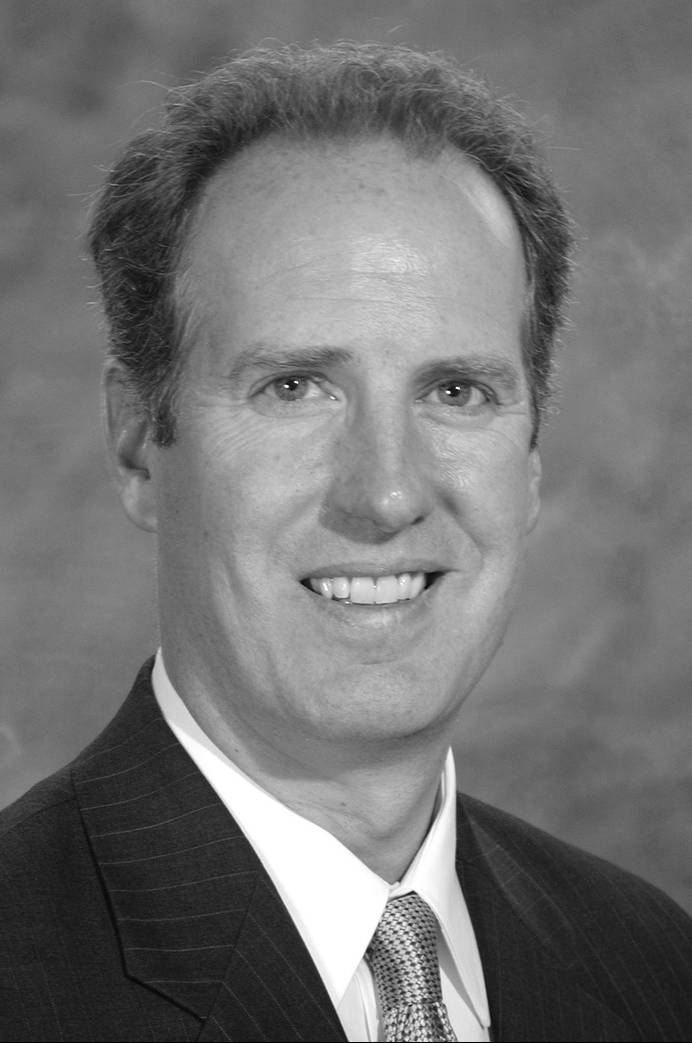

Judge of the United States Court of Appeals for the Second Circuit
- Incumbent
- Assumed office October 17, 2018
- Appointed by: Donald Trump
- Preceded by: Richard C. Wesley

Judge of the United States District Court for the Southern District of New York
- In office August 1, 2007 – October 25, 2018
- Appointed by: George W. Bush
- Preceded by: Michael Mukasey
- Succeeded by: Jennifer H. Rearden

Personal details
- Born: Richard Joseph Sullivan; 1964 (age 61–62) Manhasset, New York, U.S.
- Education: College of William and Mary (BA); Yale University (JD)

Richard Joseph Sullivan (born 1964) is an American lawyer and jurist who serves as a United States circuit judge of the United States Court of Appeals for the Second Circuit. He was formerly a United States district judge of the United States District Court for the Southern District of New York from 2007 to 2018. He has been a member of the Federalist Society, a conservative legal organization.

== Background and education ==
Sullivan was born in Manhasset, New York. He graduated from Chaminade High School in 1982 and earned a Bachelor of Arts in government and English at the College of William & Mary in 1986. He received a Juris Doctor from Yale Law School in 1990.

== Legal career ==
After law school, Sullivan worked as a law clerk to Judge David M. Ebel of the United States Court of Appeals for the Tenth Circuit and as a litigation associate at Wachtell, Lipton, Rosen & Katz.

From 1994 to 2005, Sullivan served as an Assistant United States Attorney for the Southern District of New York, where he successfully prosecuted the Maisonet heroin organization, which sold approximately $100,000 worth of heroin per day in the Hunts Point section of the Bronx and carried out numerous murders in aid of its racketeering activity. Among those prosecuted in that case was Bronx defense attorney Pat Stiso, who acted as house counsel to the RICO enterprise. Other notable cases included the investigation and indictment of Mario Villanueva Madrid, who as governor of the Mexican state of Quintana Roo accepted millions of dollars from Mexican drug cartels in exchange for providing safe passage for ton quantities of cocaine en route to the United States. Madrid was eventually extradited to the United States, where he pleaded guilty to money laundering conspiracy.

In 2002, Sullivan became chief of the newly created International Narcotics Trafficking Unit (INT), which was responsible for investigating and prosecuting the world's largest and most powerful narcotics organizations. Among the noteworthy defendants prosecuted by that unit were Colombia kingpins Alberto Orlandez Gamboa, Diego Murillo Bejarano, and Miguel and Gilberto Rodriguez Orejuela; Afghan warlord Bashir Noorzai; Dutch ecstasy kingpin Henk Rommy; and the leadership of the Revolutionary Armed Forces of Colombia (FARC).

Sullivan was named Prosecutor of the Year by the Federal Law Enforcement Association in 1998 and was awarded the Henry L. Stimson Medal from the New York City Bar Association in 2003. In 2005, Sullivan joined Marsh, Inc., a global risk and insurances firm, as deputy general counsel for litigation. He was named general counsel of Marsh in June 2006.

== Federal judicial service ==
=== District court service ===
On February 15, 2007, Sullivan was nominated by President George W. Bush to the seat on the United States District Court for the Southern District of New York vacated by Judge Michael Mukasey, who assumed senior status on August 1, 2006. Sullivan was confirmed by the United States Senate by a 99–0 vote on June 28, 2007, and received his commission on August 1, 2007. Sullivan was among the "Judges to Watch" named in the September 2012 issue of The American Lawyer. Sullivan sits on the executive board of the New York American Inn of Court and is an adjunct professor at Fordham University School of Law, where he teaches courses on white collar crime and trial advocacy, and Columbia Law School, where he teaches a course on sentencing. In 2015, Above the Law listed Sullivan as one of several District Court "feeder" judges who have sent multiple former clerks on to Supreme Court clerkships. His service on the district court terminated on October 25, 2018, when he was elevated to the court of appeals.

=== Court of appeals service ===
On April 26, 2018, President Donald Trump announced his intent to nominate Sullivan to serve as a United States Circuit Judge of the United States Court of Appeals for the Second Circuit. On May 7, 2018, his nomination was sent to the Senate. He was nominated to the seat vacated by Judge Richard C. Wesley, who assumed senior status on August 1, 2016. On August 1, 2018, a hearing on his nomination was held before the Senate Judiciary Committee. On September 13, 2018, his nomination was reported out of committee by a 17–4 vote. On October 11, 2018, his nomination was confirmed by a 79–16 vote. He received his judicial commission on October 17, 2018.

Legal offices
Preceded by Michael Mukasey	Judge of the United States District Court for the Southern District of New York; 2007–2018	Succeeded by Jennifer H. Rearden
Preceded by Richard C. Wesley	Judge of the United States Court of Appeals for the Second Circuit; 2018–present	Incumbent
