= Stephen S. Schwartz =

American judge (born 1983)

Stephen Schwartz
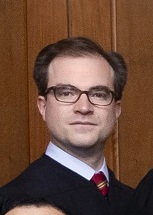
- Schwartz in 2022

Judge of the United States Court of Federal Claims
- Incumbent
- Assumed office December 22, 2020
- Appointed by: Donald Trump
- Preceded by: Marian Blank Horn

Personal details
- Born: Stephen Sidney Schwartz; 1983 (age 41–42) Rochester, Minnesota, U.S.
- Education: Yale University (BA); University of Chicago (JD)

Stephen Sidney Schwartz (born 1983) is a judge of the United States Court of Federal Claims.

== Education and career ==
Schwartz received his Bachelor of Arts, with distinction, from Yale University, and his J.D. degree, with honors, from the University of Chicago Law School, where he was an editor of the University of Chicago Law Review. In 2008, he began his legal career as a law clerk to Judge Jerry Edwin Smith of the United States Court of Appeals for the Fifth Circuit.

After his clerkship, he became an associate in the litigation practice of Kirkland & Ellis in Washington, D.C. He then served as counsel at the Cause of Action Institute, a public interest law firm. Before becoming a judge, Schwartz was a partner at Schaerr Jaffe LLP in Washington, D.C., where he litigated civil, constitutional, and administrative law matters in federal courts, including before the Supreme Court of the United States.

=== Claims court service ===
On June 7, 2017, President Donald Trump nominated Schwartz to serve as a judge of the United States Court of Federal Claims, to the seat vacated by Judge Lynn J. Bush, who assumed senior status on October 21, 2013. On July 25, 2017, the Senate Judiciary Committee held a hearing on his nomination. On September 14, 2017, his nomination was reported out of committee by a 11–9 vote. On January 3, 2018, his nomination was returned to the President under Rule XXXI, Paragraph 6 of the United States Senate. On January 8, 2018, the White House renominated 21 of 26 federal judicial nominees who had been returned by the U.S. Senate. Schwartz was not among the 21 individuals who were renominated.

On October 2, 2019, President Trump announced his intent to renominate Schwartz to serve on the United States Court of Federal Claims. On October 17, 2019, his nomination was sent to the Senate. President Trump nominated Schwartz to the seat vacated by Judge Marian Blank Horn, who assumed senior status on March 9, 2018. On January 3, 2020, his nomination was returned to the President under Rule XXXI, Paragraph 6 of the Senate. On January 9, 2020, he was renominated to the same seat. On May 14, 2020, his nomination was reported out of committee by a 12–10 vote. On December 7, 2020, the Senate invoked cloture on his nomination by a 48–46 vote. On December 8, 2020, his nomination was confirmed by a 49–47 vote. He received his judicial commission on December 22, 2020, and was sworn in on December 23, 2020.

Legal offices
Preceded by Marian Blank Horn	Judge of the United States Court of Federal Claims; 2020–present	Incumbent
