= Mark V. Holmes =

American judge (born 1960)

Mark Holmes

Senior Judge of the United States Tax Court
- Incumbent
- Assumed office June 30, 2018

Judge of the United States Tax Court
- In office June 30, 2003 – June 29, 2018
- Appointed by: George W. Bush
- Preceded by: Julian Jacobs
- Succeeded by: Kashi Way

Personal details
- Born: Mark Van Dyke Holmes; July 6, 1960 (age 65) Buffalo, New York, U.S.
- Education: Harvard University (BA); University of Chicago (JD)

Mark Van Dyke Holmes (born July 6, 1960) is an American lawyer who serves as a senior judge of the United States Tax Court.

== Career ==
He earned a Bachelor of Arts from Harvard College in 1979 and his J.D. degree from the University of Chicago Law School in 1983.

After graduating from law school, Holmes clerked for Judge Alex Kozinski of the United States Court of Appeals for the Ninth Circuit, worked for Cahill Gordon & Reindel, Sullivan & Cromwell, and Miller & Chevalier, served as counsel to the chairman of the United States International Trade Commission, and spent two years as a deputy assistant attorney general in the United States Department of Justice Tax Division.

He was appointed by President George W. Bush to be a judge of the United States Tax Court on June 30, 2003, for a term ending June 29, 2018. He is known for writing colorful, engaging opinions on tax matters.

On April 24, 2018, President Donald Trump nominated him for another 15-year term on the court. On February 6, 2019, his re-nomination was sent to the Senate. On January 3, 2020, his nomination was returned to the President under Rule XXXI, Paragraph 6 of the United States Senate.

On December 10, 2020, his nomination was sent to the Senate. President Trump nominated Holmes for reappointment to the Tax Court. On January 3, 2021, his nomination was returned to the President under Rule XXXI, Paragraph 6 of the United States Senate. Later that same day, his renomination was sent to the Senate. His nomination was withdrawn on February 4, 2021.

== Organizational memberships ==
- American Bar Association (Litigation and Tax Sections)
- New York and District of Columbia Bars
- Federalist Society

Legal offices
Preceded by Julian Jacobs	Judge of the United States Tax Court; 2003–2018	Succeeded by Kashi Way
