= Jeff Mateer =

American lawyer

First Assistant Attorney General of Texas
- In office April 2016 – October 2020
- Attorney General: Ken Paxton
- Preceded by: Chip Roy
- Succeeded by: Brent Webster

Personal details
- Education: Dickinson College (BA); Southern Methodist University (JD)

Jeffrey Carl Mateer is an American lawyer. From 2016 to 2020, he served as First Assistant Attorney General of Texas. In September 2017, he was nominated by President Donald Trump to become a United States district judge of the United States District Court for the Eastern District of Texas; however, the nomination was withdrawn in December 2017.

Mateer previously served as general counsel of the First Liberty Institute, a conservative religious liberty advocacy group headquartered in Plano. He returned to the Institute, following his resignation from the Attorney General's Office.

== Biography ==
Mateer earned his Bachelor of Arts with honors from Dickinson College and his Juris Doctor with honors from the Dedman School of Law. He spent nearly 20 years litigating in private practice, where he handled a range of trial and appellate matters. He then became general counsel and executive vice president of the First Liberty Institute. In two 2015 speeches, he described the issue of transgender children as a deception and "part of Satan's plan". He also spoke in opposition to state bans on conversion therapy at a conference hosted by Kevin Swanson, a pastor who preaches that the Biblical punishment for homosexuality is death. Mateer said that the legalization of same-sex marriage could lead to the legalization of polygamy and bestiality.

From 2016 to 2020, Mateer served as the First Assistant Attorney General of Texas under Attorney General Ken Paxton, supervising the state's active litigation matters. Upon resigning, he filed a complaint against AG Paxton alleging wrongdoing along with other top attorneys in the litigation division.

Following his public service, Mateer returned to the First Liberty Institute.

== Failed nomination to District Court ==
On September 7, 2017, President Donald Trump nominated Mateer to serve as a United States District Judge of the United States District Court for the Eastern District of Texas, to the seat vacated by Judge Richard A. Schell, who assumed senior status on March 10, 2015. Mateer was recommended to the White House by Senators John Cornyn and Ted Cruz. After Mateer's remarks about transgender children being part of "Satan's plan" and his support for conversion therapy were publicized in late September 2017, John Cornyn, the senior Republican Senator from Texas and then-Senate Majority Whip, expressed skepticism about Mateer's suitability to sit on the federal bench. Cornyn and members of a committee that screens Texas judicial candidates said that Mateer had not disclosed the statements. Cruz said that he still supported Mateer's nomination. In December 2017, Mateer's nomination for the federal judiciary was withdrawn. On January 3, 2018, his nomination was returned to the President under Rule XXXI, Paragraph 6 of the United States Senate. On January 8, 2018, the White House renominated 21 of 26 federal judicial nominees who had been returned by the U.S. Senate. Mateer was not among them.

== See also ==
- Donald Trump judicial appointment controversies

Legal offices
Preceded by Chip Roy	First Assistant Attorney General of Texas; 2016–2020	Succeeded by Brent Webster
