= North Coast Cartel =

Colombian drug cartel

- La Alianza Norteña, Las Barranquillas
- Years active: 1980s-2011
- Territory: Caribbean Region of Colombia, Panama and Venezuela
- Ethnicity: Colombians
- Leader: Alberto Orlandez Gamboa
- Activities: Drug trafficking, money laundering, gun-running, terrorism, murder, bootlegging and prostitution

The North Coast Cartel (Spanish: Cartel de la Costa or Cartel de la Costa Atlántica) was a drug cartel operating in northern Colombia between 1980 and 2010. It mostly controlled the illegal drug trade along the Colombian Caribbean coast, including shipments from other regions of Colombia, neighboring countries, and local production. Its operations center was the city of Barranquilla. It was also known as the Barranquilla Cartel (Spanish: Cartel de Barranquilla).

== History ==
The leader of this cartel was Alberto Orlandez Gamboa a.k.a El Caracol, who in a vendetta eliminated the Valdeblanquez family. He was arrested on June 6, 1998, and extradited later to the United States where he pleaded guilty for numerous drug-related crimes, plus, he was sentenced to 40 years of prison. Its members were Jose Reinaldo Fiallo Jacome El Nano, Jairo Duran Fernández El Mico, the congressman for the department of Magdalena Alex Durán Fernández, brother of El Mico Duran, Cruz Antonio Gonzalez Peña Crucito Gonzalez, Gustavo Salazar Bernal, Alexander Enrique Batalla El Alto, Jesucristo or Alex, Salomón Camacho Mora Papa Grande, Samuel Orlando Mengual Alarcón El Rey de La Guajira, Libardo de Jesús Parra González El Flaco or El Guajiro and The Nasser Arana family. This family was led by Julio Cesar Nasser David a.k.a. El Turco (The Turkish) and his ex-wife Sheila Miriam Arana Maria.

Other notable members of the North Coast cartel were the Nasser Arana family who owned several assets in Barranquilla and numerous properties in Barranquilla and The Coast, including the luxurious Hotel El Prado, which is now property of the Colombian government and next to enter into an open tender process. The most prominent members of the clan were Julio Cesar Nasser David and his ex-wife Sheila Miriam Arana Maria (divorced in 1984). She was captured in Switzerland and then extradited to the United States in September 1994. She admitted responsibility for sending to the United States some 30 shipments of cocaine and marijuana between 1976 and 1994, totaling over a million of tonnes of drugs in that country. Her ex-husband was also covered by the extradition but he died of natural causes, on January 13, 2000, in the jail of La Picota in Bogotá. She was released in 2002 and since then her whereabouts is uncertain.

His older son Jorge Nasser Arana a.k.a. "Tito" was the owner of the disappeared bowling room Tito's Bolos Club, currently occupied by a Christian church and in a process of auction. He was captured in 1998 but was freed in September 2000 for expiration of terms and later that decision was revocated and in November of the same year he surrendered in jail La Modelo of Barranquilla. Claudia Nasser and Carlos Alberto "Capeto" Nasser were found guilty of money laundering and illegal enrichment. In March 2001, Carlos Alberto "Capeto" Nasser Arana and his sister Claudia Nasser Arana were acquitted by a specialized judge in Bogotá. After serving time in prison, their son Jorge "Tito" Nasser Arana was killed by gunmen in Barranquilla exiting a local gym 20 days after his acquittal. Since the crime of Jorge, the whereabouts of Claudia Patricia and Carlos Alberto Nasser Arana a.k.a. "Capeto" is unknown.

== Other members ==
- José Reinaldo Fiallo Jácome, aka "El Nano": Ordered the murder of the vallenato singer of the Binomio de Oro band, Rafael Orozco Maestre, which occurred on June 11, 1992, in Barranquilla, and was committed by his bodyguard Sergio Gonzalez, aka "Tato". Both Fiallo and Gonzalez were killed in a restaurant in Medellín on November 18, 1992, on the orders of Pablo Escobar.
- Durán Fernández Brothers: Jairo (a.k.a "El Mico") married with then Miss Colombia Maribel Gutierrez Tinoco in 1991 and Alex was a congressman by Magdalena department. In January 1992, the Duran brothers were defendants of narcotrafficking and money laundering by Spanish justice. Between October 1992 and February 1993 respectfully Jairo and Alex Duran were killed in a vendetta leadered by Alberto Orlandez Gamboa a.k.a "El Caracol". In 1994, his young brother Carlos Durán Fernandez was killed.
- Cruz Antonio Gonzalez Peña a.k.a. "Crucito Gonzalez": He was killed in the extinted bar called Champagne Vallenato in Barranquilla with other 6 people by gunmen. He was a collaborator of Alberto Orlandez Gamboa a.k.a. "El Caracol".
- Rafael De La Torre Rojas a.k.a. "El Burro": Born in Barranquilla believed to be mentor and collaborator of El Caracol played a major role in the founding of the cartel. Actually believed to reside in Miami, Florida or Paterson, New Jersey.
- Gustavo Salazar Bernal: Killed in Cartagena on August 30, 2001, by gunman Jhon Fredy Orrego Marín who was associated to the Norte del Valle Cartel. He was killed for being responsible for "losing" a shipment of drugs property of "Los Mellizos" with destiny to Europe. His brother Fernando Salazar Bernal was also killed by the Norte del Valle Cartel.
- Alexander Enrique Batalla, a.k.a. "Jesucristo", "El Alto" or "Alex": Ancient collaborator of El Caracol, and boss of an old organization of traffic of heroine with aeronautical technics in airports of Colombia and United States for introduce drugs in that country. He was extradited in 2010 but freed in 2016.
- Salomón Camacho Mora a.k.a. "Papa Grande": Second in command of Cartel, he was captured in Venezuela in 2010 and extradited to United States when served a sentence of 11 years of prison but he was freed in 2019.
- Samuel Orlando Mengual Alarcón a.k.a. "El Rey de La Guajira": He was originary of the corregimiento of Camarones, La Guajira and he helped to Dandeny Muñoz Mosquera a.k.a. "La Quica" leave the country. Mengual was killed in 1995 in the La Picota Jail in Bogotá.

== See also ==
- Narcotrafficking in Colombia
- Rodrigo Tovar Pupo
