= Kevin R. Sweazea =

American lawyer (born 1963)

Magistrate Judge of the United States District Court for the District of New Mexico
- Incumbent
- Assumed office May 3, 2017

Judge of the Seventh Judicial District Court of New Mexico
- In office March 2001 – May 3, 2017
- Appointed by: Gary Johnson
- Preceded by: Neil Mertz
- Succeeded by: Shannon Murdock

Personal details
- Born: 1963 (age 62–63) McIntosh, South Dakota, U.S.
- Education: New Mexico State University (BAcy); Baylor University (JD)

Kevin Ray Sweazea (born 1963) is a United States magistrate judge of the United States District Court for the District of New Mexico and a former nominee to be a United States district judge of the same court.

== Education ==
Sweazea earned his Bachelor of Accountancy from New Mexico State University and his Juris Doctor from Baylor Law School.

== Career ==
Early in his career, Sweazea worked for various New Mexico law firms in private practice, where his practice included litigation, regulatory, and transactional matters. Judge Sweazea has also served as a member of the New Mexico Environmental Improvement Board and Socorro County Land Use Commission.

Sweazea was appointed to the Seventh Judicial District Court of New Mexico by then Governor Gary Johnson in March 2001. He was retained in the 2002, 2008 and 2014 elections and served ten years as Chief Judge.

== Federal judicial service ==
Sweazea was selected as a magistrate judge on May 3, 2017.

=== Failed nomination to district court ===
On May 29, 2019, President Donald Trump announced his intent to nominate Sweazea to serve as a United States district judge for the United States District Court for the District of New Mexico. On June 12, 2019, his nomination was sent to the Senate. President Trump nominated Sweazea to the seat vacated by Judge Robert C. Brack, who took senior status on July 25, 2018. On October 29, 2019 it was announced that Sweazea withdrew his nomination after New Mexico's two senators, Tom Udall and Martin Heinrich, withdrew their initial support for him. On January 3, 2020, his nomination was returned to the President under Rule XXXI, Paragraph 6 of the United States Senate.

== See also ==
- Donald Trump judicial appointment controversies
