= Thomas Farr =

American attorney (1954–2024)

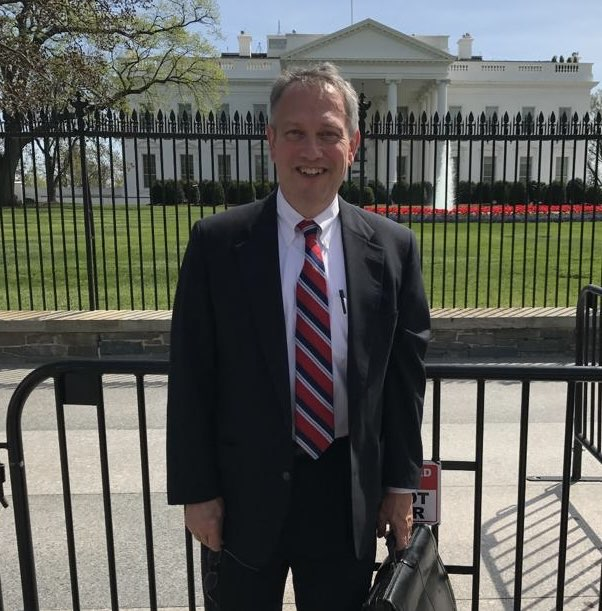
- Tom Farr in 2018
- Born: Thomas Alvin Farr; October 24, 1954; Cincinnati, Ohio, U.S.
- Died: April 1, 2024 (aged 69)
- Education: Hillsdale College (BLS); Emory University (JD); Georgetown University (LLM)

Thomas Alvin Farr (October 24, 1954 – April 1, 2024) was an American attorney. Farr was nominated by President Donald Trump for a judgeship on the United States District Court for the Eastern District of North Carolina in 2017, and again in 2018. Farr was considered a controversial nominee due to his alleged involvement in suppression of African-American voters. On November 29, 2018, Republican U.S. Senators Jeff Flake and Tim Scott announced their opposition to Farr's nomination. Together with unanimous opposition of Senate Democrats, this made it impossible for Farr's nomination to be confirmed.

== Early life and education ==
Thomas Alvin Farr was born in Cincinnati, Ohio, on October 24, 1954. He earned his Bachelor of Liberal Studies, summa cum laude, from Hillsdale College, where he was co-salutatorian. He received his Juris Doctor from the Emory University School of Law and a Master of Laws in labor law from the Georgetown Law.

== Career ==
After graduating from law school, Farr served as a law clerk to Judge Frank William Bullock Jr. of the United States District Court for the Middle District of North Carolina. Prior to entering private practice, he was an attorney with the National Right to Work Legal Defense Foundation and counsel to the United States Senate Committee on Labor and Human Resources. At the time of his death, he was a shareholder in the Raleigh office of Ogletree, Deakins, Nash, Smoak & Stewart, P.C. where his practice focused on employment matters and constitutional law.

Farr was considered an expert in the field of gerrymandering and spoke at ALEC on the subject. Farr was a member of the Federalist Society from 1985.

=== North Carolina racial voter suppression ===
Farr was accused of voter suppression towards African-American voters. In November 2018, Republican Senator Tim Scott opposed Farr's nomination for a federal judgeship, citing a 1991 DOJ memorandum on Farr's involvement in the 1984 Jesse Helms campaign's alleged voter suppression against African-Americans.

==== North Carolina voter ID law ====
In 2010, Farr advised the North Carolina General Assembly in what federal courts termed a "racial gerrymander" of the state's voting districts. Farr was involved with drafting the 2013 North Carolina voter I.D. law and helped legislators evaluate racial data requested from the North Carolina DMV, which showed that black voters disproportionately lacked driver's licenses. The DMV data also "revealed that African Americans disproportionately used early voting, same-day registration, and out-of-precinct voting", all of which were curtailed by the law, while absentee voting, disproportionately used by white voters, was exempted from the voter ID requirements. Farr defended the voting restrictions in court before the United States Court of Appeals for the Fourth Circuit. The appeals court struck down the law, writing that the law targeted African Americans "with almost surgical precision."

Farr represented Republican state legislators in lawsuits related to redistricting and voter identification changes which were struck down by a court as racially biased. Newsweek described Farr as having a "history of working on voter suppression...part of a wider Republican effort that critics say disenfranchises African-Americans and the poor."

==== Jesse Helms campaigns ====
A 1991 memorandum by the U.S. Department of Justice Civil Rights Division describing alleged suppression of minority voters.

In 1984, Farr was involved in the Jesse Helms Senate campaign. A 1991 memorandum from the Department of Justice under the George H.W. Bush administration stated that "Farr was the primary coordinator of the 1984 'ballot security' program conducted by the NCGOP and 1984 Helms for Senate Committee. He coordinated several 'ballot security' activities in 1984, including a postcard mailing to voters in predominantly black precincts which was designed to serve as a basis to challenge voters on election day."

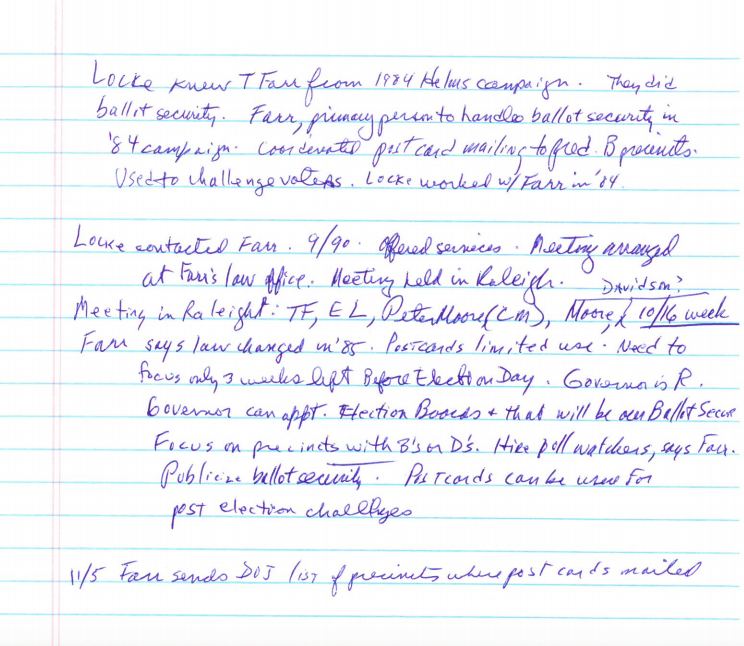
Hebert's notes documenting Farr's participation in a planning meeting prior to the postcard mailing.

In 1990, Farr served as the lead legal counsel on Jesse Helms' campaign. The campaign mailed two batches of postcards, totaling about 124,000, "virtually exclusively to black voters" warning "that residency requirements were strict and vote fraud was punishable by imprisonment." The first batch was sent "exclusively to the black voters who had a change of address associated with their name", while the recipients of the second batch were 93.1% African-American.

The DOJ sued Helms, saying that the mailers were intended to intimidate African-Americans from voting. As the campaign's legal counsel, Farr defended Helms in the DOJ lawsuit. Farr himself "denied any role in drafting the postcards and said he did not know about them until after the mailers were sent" and was "'appalled' when he found out about them." Gerald Hebert, a former Department of Justice investigator, contradicted Farr's denial, stating that according to "contemporaneous handwritten notes", Farr partook in a meeting planning the postcards. The Leadership Conference on Civil and Human Rights and the NAACP Legal Defense and Educational Fund called upon the Senate to further question Farr about his apparent lack of candor. Senator Orrin G. Hatch, Republican of Utah and a member of the Senate Judiciary Committee, called the criticisms of Farr “utterly false character assassination nonsense.”

== Failed judicial nominations ==
Farr was nominated to a federal judgeship in both 2006 and 2007 by George W. Bush, but he never received a vote in the Senate Judiciary Committee.

On July 13, 2017, President Donald Trump nominated Farr to serve as a United States district judge of the United States District Court for the Eastern District of North Carolina. Farr was nominated to fill the seat vacated by Judge Malcolm Jones Howard, who assumed senior status on December 31, 2005. On September 20, 2017, a hearing on his nomination was held before the Senate Judiciary Committee. On October 19, 2017, his nomination was reported out of committee by an 11–9 vote. On January 3, 2018, Farr's nomination was returned to the President under Rule XXXI, Paragraph 6 of the United States Senate.

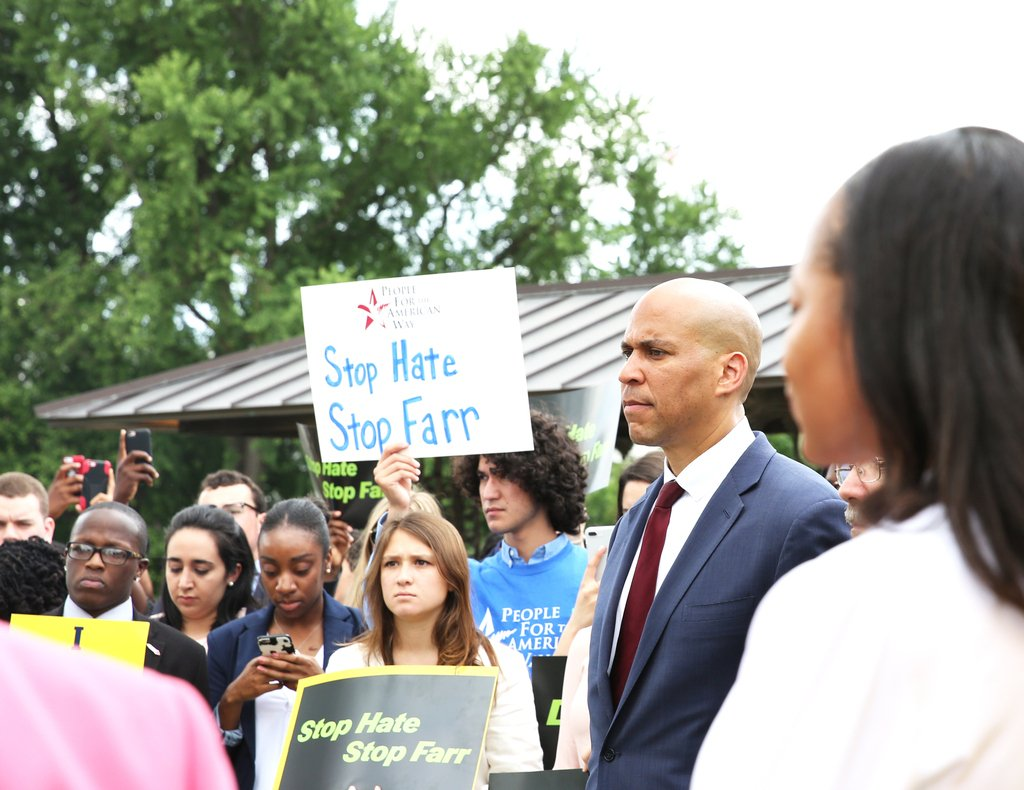
Senator Cory Booker at a protest opposing Trump's nomination of Farr in 2018.

On January 5, 2018, President Trump announced his intent to renominate Farr to the U.S. District Court for the Eastern District of North Carolina. On January 8, 2018, his renomination was sent to the Senate. Farr was unanimously rated as "well qualified" by the American Bar Association. On January 18, 2018, his nomination was reported out of committee by an 11–10 vote.

Farr's nomination was opposed by the Congressional Black Caucus due to Farr's role as a lawyer defending North Carolina voting restrictions which were struck down by a court as racially biased. During his Senate confirmation hearing, Farr said that he disagreed with the Fourth Circuit panel's ruling and that "at the time our clients enacted those laws, I do not believe that they thought that were purposefully discriminating against African Americans." He added that if he were confirmed to the federal judiciary, he would follow the Fourth Circuit's ruling.

On November 28, 2018, the United States Senate invoked cloture on Farr’s nomination by a 51–50 vote, with Vice President Mike Pence casting the tie-breaking vote. The following day, Republican Senators Jeff Flake of Arizona and Tim Scott of South Carolina opposed to Farr's nomination; joined all 49 Democratic Senators who opposed his nomination as well; the opposition from Flake and Scott assured that his nomination would be rejected.

On January 3, 2019, his nomination was returned to the President under Rule XXXI, Paragraph 6 of the United States Senate.

== Death ==
Farr died on April 1, 2024 at the age of 69, after a series of heart problems.

== See also ==
- Donald Trump judicial appointment controversies
