= Iris Lan =

American lawyer

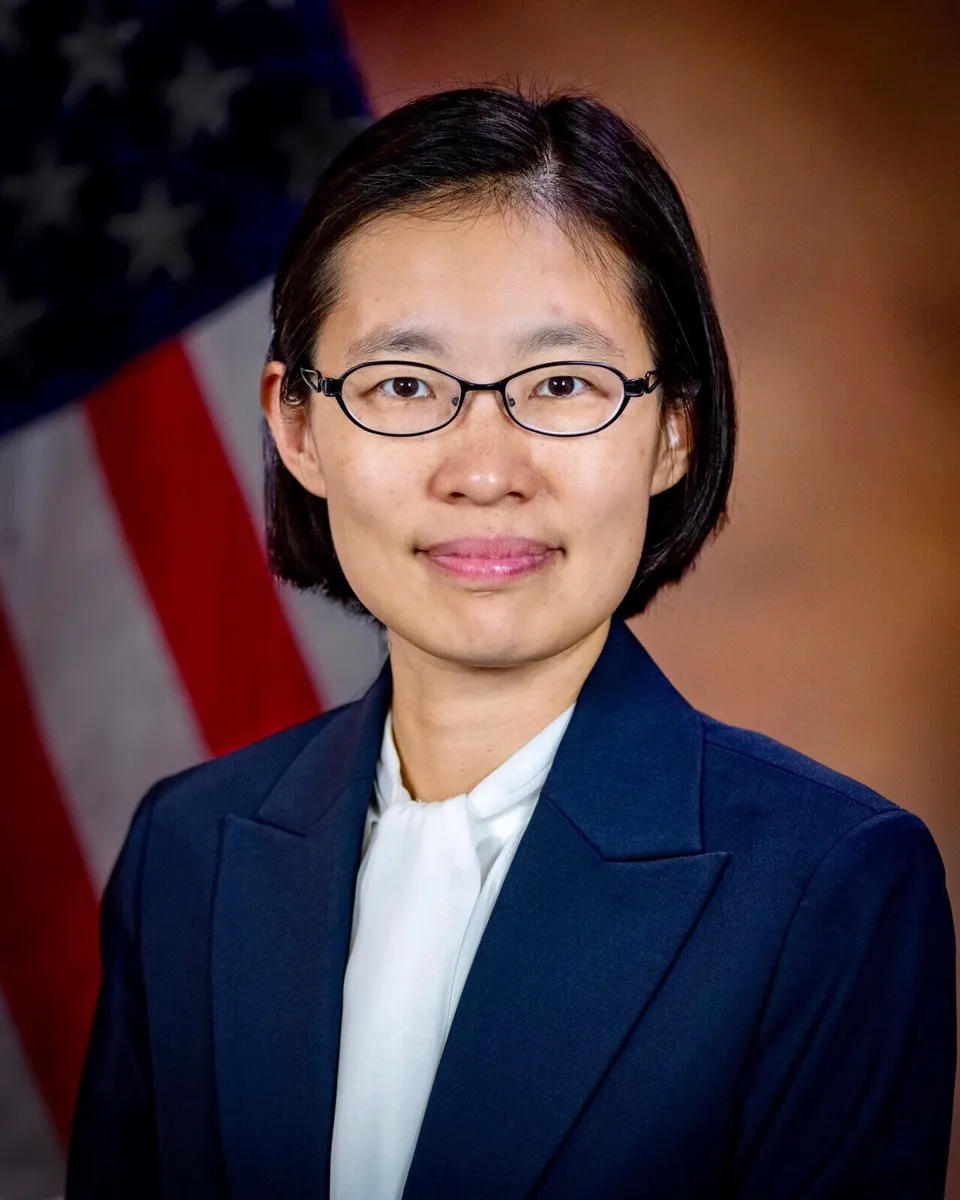
- Official NASA portrait

Personal details
- Education: Harvard University (BA, MA, JD)

Iris Lan is an American lawyer who serves as a career associate deputy attorney general in the United States Department of Justice. She was previously an Assistant U.S. Attorney in the Southern District of New York and taught as an adjunct lecturer at Columbia Law School. She was appointed general counsel of NASA in June 2023.

== Career ==
Lan began her career as a law clerk to Judge William Curtis Bryson of the United States Court of Appeals for the Federal Circuit and as a litigation associate at Cravath, Swaine & Moore LLP. Lan subsequently joined the Department of Justice as an Assistant United States Attorney in the Southern District of New York, where she handled a wide range of criminal trials and appeals. Among other cases, she prosecuted an FCPA case against a former CEO; the Worldcom securities fraud case; and al Qaeda terrorists for the 1998 United States embassy bombings in East Africa. She was later promoted to serve as deputy chief of the appeals unit, supervising prosecutors in briefing and arguing appeals before the U.S. Court of Appeals for the Second Circuit. During the Obama administration, Lan also served as a counsel to the assistant attorney general for the Department's National Security Division, David S. Kris, and as an attorney-adviser in the Office of Legal Counsel. This is also when she began serving as a career associate deputy attorney general.

Lan is a former nominee to be a United States District Judge of the United States District Court for the Southern District of New York. On November 6, 2019, the President announced his intent to nominate Lan to serve as a United States district judge. On December 2, 2019, her nomination was sent to the Senate. The President nominated Lan to the seat vacated by Judge Katherine B. Forrest, who resigned on September 11, 2018. On January 3, 2020, her nomination was returned to the President under Rule XXXI, Paragraph 6 of the United States Senate. On May 4, 2020, her renomination was sent to the Senate, along with the nomination of two other New York nominees, Jennifer Rearden and Saritha Komatireddy. Once the 2020 United States presidential election happened, Democratic Senators stopped returning blue slips for all New York nominees. On January 3, 2021, her nomination was returned to the President under Rule XXXI, Paragraph 6 of the United States Senate.

While at the U.S. Attorney's Office, Lan also taught at Columbia Law School. Lan is an elected member of the American Law Institute.

In June 2023, she was appointed NASA General Counsel.
