= Steve Kim =

American judge (born 1972)

Magistrate Judge of the United States District Court for the Central District of California
- Incumbent
- Assumed office 2016

Personal details
- Born: Sung-Wook Kim; 1972 (age 53–54) Seoul, South Korea
- Party: Democratic
- Education: University of Oklahoma (BA); Georgetown University (JD)

Steve Kim (born 1972) is a United States magistrate judge for the United States District Court for the Central District of California who is a former nominee to be a United States district judge of the same court.

== Education ==
Born in Seoul, South Korea, Kim received his Bachelor of Arts, with special distinction, from the University of Oklahoma in 1996 and his Juris Doctor, magna cum laude, from Georgetown University Law Center in 1999, where he was inducted into the Order of the Coif and served as Notes & Comments Editor of The Georgetown Law Journal.

== Career ==
Upon graduation from law school, Kim served as a law clerk to Judge Sidney R. Thomas of the United States Court of Appeals for the Ninth Circuit and Judge Stephen Victor Wilson of the United States District Court for the Central District of California. Before his work as a federal prosecutor, Kim practiced civil trial and appellate litigation at Munger, Tolles & Olson in Los Angeles. Beginning in 2003, he served as an Assistant United States Attorney in the Criminal Division of the United States Attorney's Office for the Central District of California. Before taking the bench, Kim was the Managing Director for Stroz Friedberg, LLC, where he advised clients in cybersecurity compliance, data privacy, and law and technology issues.

=== Federal judicial service ===
==== United States magistrate judge ====
He assumed office as a United States magistrate judge in 2016. In that capacity, he presided over the arraignment of actress Lori Loughlin, in her trial for fraud in connection with the admission of her daughters to the University of Southern California, which was part of the larger Varsity Blues scandal. Kim set Loughlin's bail at $1 million.

==== Expired nomination to district court ====
On September 20, 2019, President Donald Trump announced his intent to nominate Kim to serve as a United States district judge for the United States District Court for the Central District of California. On November 21, 2019, his nomination was sent to the Senate. President Trump nominated Kim to the seat vacated by Judge Beverly Reid O'Connell, who died on October 8, 2017. Kim was "recommended for appointment by California's Democratic senators", and noted to have an "apolitical background and relatively noncontroversial record", for which it was therefore predicted that he "should be confirmed relatively comfortably". However, on January 3, 2020, his nomination was returned to the President under Rule XXXI, Paragraph 6 of the United States Senate. On February 13, 2020, his renomination was sent to the Senate. On January 3, 2021, his nomination was returned to the President under Rule XXXI, Paragraph 6 of the United States Senate.

== See also ==
- List of Asian American jurists
