= Marian Blank Horn =

American judge (born 1943)

Marian Horn
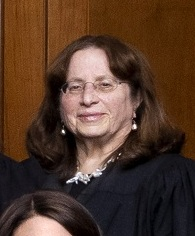
- Horn in 2022

Senior Judge of the United States Court of Federal Claims
- Incumbent
- Assumed office March 9, 2018
- In office April 13, 2001 – March 10, 2003

Judge of the United States Court of Federal Claims
- In office March 10, 2003 – March 9, 2018
- Appointed by: George W. Bush
- Preceded by: Herself
- Succeeded by: Stephen S. Schwartz
- In office April 14, 1986 – April 13, 2001
- Appointed by: Ronald Reagan
- Preceded by: Alex Kozinski
- Succeeded by: Herself

Personal details
- Born: Marian Blank; 1943 (age 82–83) New York City, New York, U.S.
- Education: Barnard College (BA); Fordham University (JD)

Marian Blank Horn (born 1943) is a senior judge of the United States Court of Federal Claims.

== Early life, education, and career ==
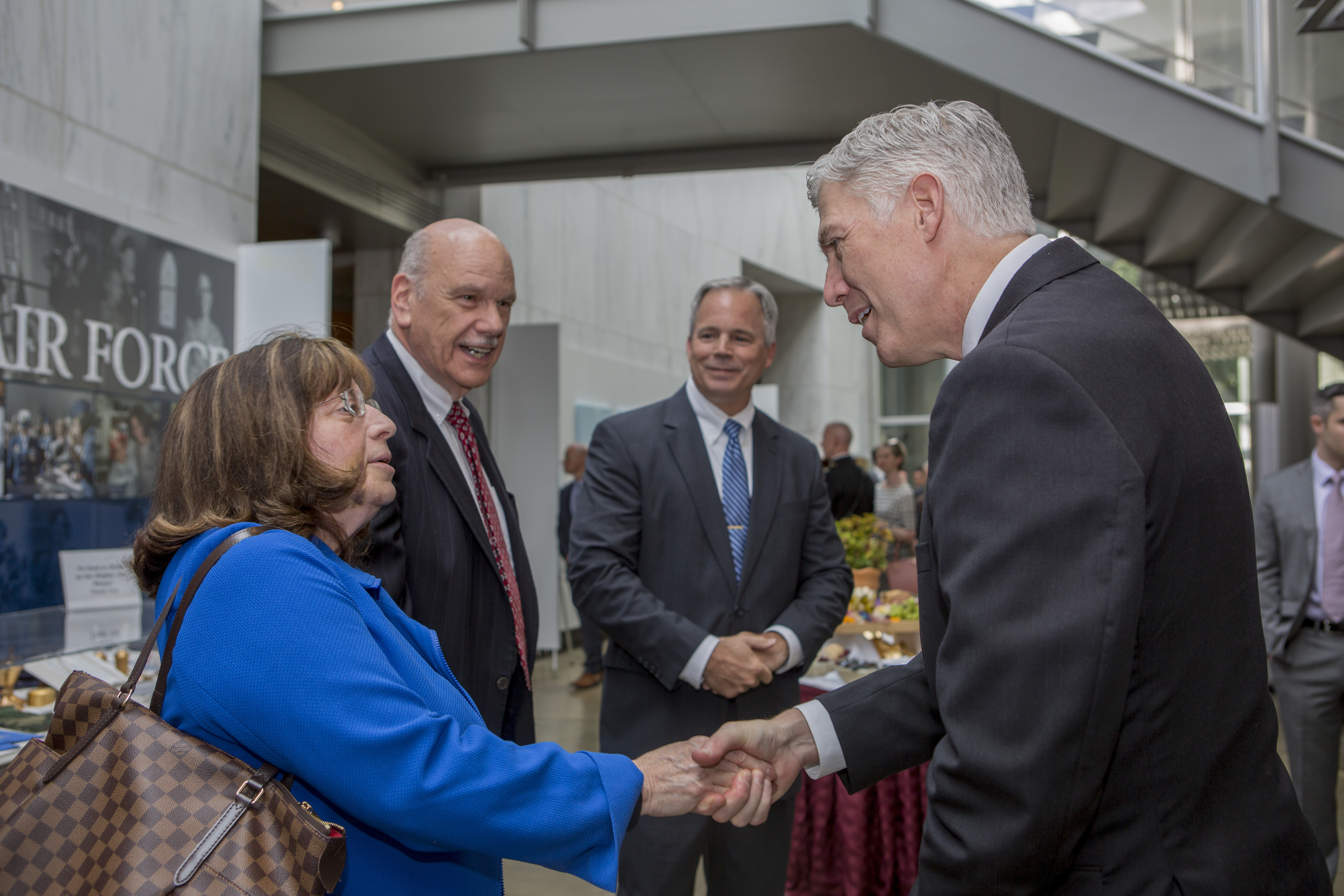
Judge Horn with her husband Robert Horn, Marine Corps counsel Robert Hogue and Justice Neil Gorsuch in 2017

Horn was born in New York City. She attended the Fieldston School and received a Bachelor of Arts degree from Barnard College, and a Juris Doctor from the Fordham University School of Law, in 1969. She was an assistant district attorney in Bronx County, New York, and then entered private practice as a litigator with the firm of Arent, Fox, Kintner, Plotkin and Kahn.

From 1973 to 1975, Horn was a project manager for a Study of Alternatives to Conventional Criminal Adjudication, and an adjunct professor at American University's Washington College of Law. She then joined the Office of General Counsel for the Department of Energy/Federal Energy Administration, and in 1979 became the Office's deputy assistant general counsel for Financial Incentives, Office of General Counsel.

From 1981 to 1986, she worked in the United States Department of the Interior, where she assisted the Associate Solicitor and helped administer the Surface Mining Control and Reclamation Act of 1977. In 1985, Horn was promoted to principal deputy solicitor, where she supervised all the Regional and Field Offices of the Solicitor's Office in the Department and acted as the chief lawyer to the Secretary and Under Secretary of the Department of the Interior.

=== Claims court service ===
In 1986, President Ronald Reagan appointed Horn as judge of the United States Court of Federal Claims. She was reappointed by President George W. Bush in 2003 and assumed senior status on March 9, 2018.

== Personal life ==
Horn is the daughter of Werner and Mady Blank. Her father was a German judge removed from the bench in Berlin by the Nazis for being Jewish. She was married to Robert J. Horn, a lawyer who was the founding chair of the Republican National Lawyers Association, until his death in February 2020. They have three daughters.

Legal offices
Preceded by Alex Kozinski	Judge of the United States Court of Federal Claims; 1986–2001	Succeeded by Herself
Preceded by Herself	Judge of the United States Court of Federal Claims; 2003–2018	Succeeded by Stephen S. Schwartz
