= Alberto Orlandez Gamboa =

- Born: 1934 (age 91–92)
- Other name: "El Caracol" ("The Snail")
- Occupation: Former Leader of The North Coast Cartel
- Criminal charges: Drug trafficking, money laundering, assassination, kidnapping, bribery
- Penalty: 40 years imprisonment

Alberto Orlandez Gamboa, also known as "El Caracol" ("The Snail"), is a Colombian drug lord and the former leader of the North Coast Cartel.

Orlandez Gamboa led the cartel from the coastal city of Barranquilla. He was known for his smuggling methods, hiding cocaine in mustard crates, sawdust, and cough medicine to hide the odor. He also smuggled cocaine in engine parts, cement and ceramic tiles.

Orlandez Gamboa was arrested on June 6, 1998, extradited to the United States in 2000 and pleaded guilty to drug trafficking charges. He was sentenced to 40 years in prison.
