= Kashi Way =

American judge

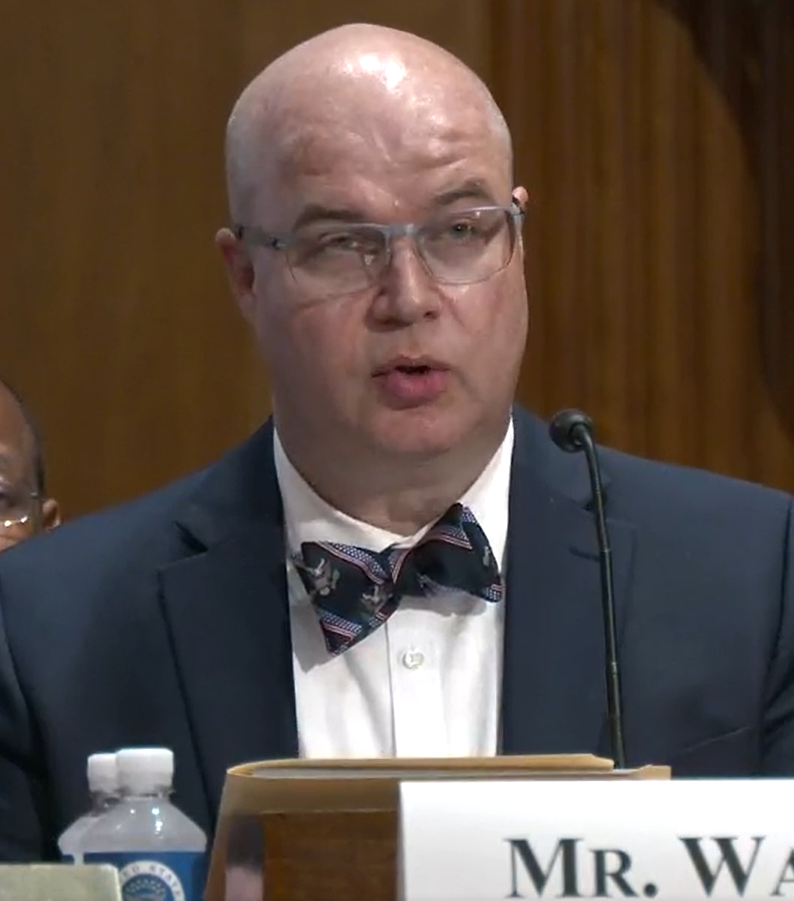

Judge of the United States Tax Court
- Incumbent
- Assumed office August 7, 2024
- Appointed by: Joe Biden
- Preceded by: Mark V. Holmes

Personal details
- Education: University of Southern California (BA); Columbia University (MA)

Kashi Way is an American lawyer who is serving as a judge of the United States Tax Court.

== Education ==
Way earned a Bachelor of Arts from the University of Southern California, a Master of Arts from Columbia University and studied law at the University of Virginia.

== Career ==
Way began his career as a law clerk at the U.S. Tax Court and spent several years in private practice at Covington & Burling. From 2005 to 2024, he served as senior legislation counsel with the staff of the United States Congressional Joint Committee on Taxation. His primary areas of responsibility included energy-related tax issues and the Research & Experimentation Tax Credit. Way also worked on insurance tax issues, issues relating to tax-exempt organizations, and geographically targeted tax incentives.

=== United States Tax Court service ===
On February 1, 2024, President Biden nominated Way to the seat vacated by Judge Mark V. Holmes, whose term expired on June 29, 2018. On June 4, 2024, a hearing on his nomination was held before the Senate Finance Committee. On June 13, 2024, his nomination was reported out of committee by a 25–2 vote. On July 24, 2024, the United States Senate invoked cloture on his nomination by a 78–16 vote. The following day, his nomination was confirmed by a 79–16 vote. He was sworn into office on August 7, 2024.

Legal offices
Preceded by Mark V. Holmes	Judge of the United States Tax Court; 2024–present	Incumbent
