= Julian Jacobs =

American judge (1937–2025)

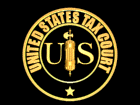

Julian Isadore "Jerry" Jacobs (August 13, 1937 – April 5, 2025) was an American lawyer and jurist who served as a judge of the United States Tax Court.

== Life and career ==
Jacobs was born in Maryland and received a B.A. from the University of Maryland in 1958 an LL.B. from the University of Maryland Law School in 1960, and an LL.M. in Taxation from Georgetown University Law Center in 1965. Admitted to Maryland Bar in 1960, he was an attorney for the Internal Revenue Service in Washington, D.C., from 1961 to 1965, and in Buffalo, New York, in Regional Counsel's Office, from 1965 to 1967. He entered private practice in Baltimore, Maryland, in 1967, working as an associate (1972–1974) and partner (1974–1984) in the law firm of Gordon, Feinblatt, Rothman, Hoffberger and Hollander. During this time, he was chairman of a commission appointed to improve the quality of the Maryland Tax Court, in 1978, and participated in various other studies and commissions convened to consider changes in Maryland tax laws. He also taught as an adjunct professor of law in the Graduate Tax Programs of the University of Baltimore School of Law (1991–1993), University of San Diego School of Law (2001), and the University of Denver School of Law (2001–2004).

Jacobs was appointed by President Ronald Reagan as a judge of the United States Tax Court, effective March 30, 1984, for a term ending March 29, 1999. He retired on March 30, 1999, but was recalled as senior judge to continue performing judicial duties. On June 7, 2019, Jacobs permanently retired from judicial service.

Jacobs moved to Garrett Park, Maryland, in 1988, and lived there for the remainder of his life. He was married twice, having two children from his first marriage, and two stepchildren from his second. He died on April 5, 2025, at the age of 87.
