= First Liberty Institute =

American religious liberty advocacy organization

First Liberty
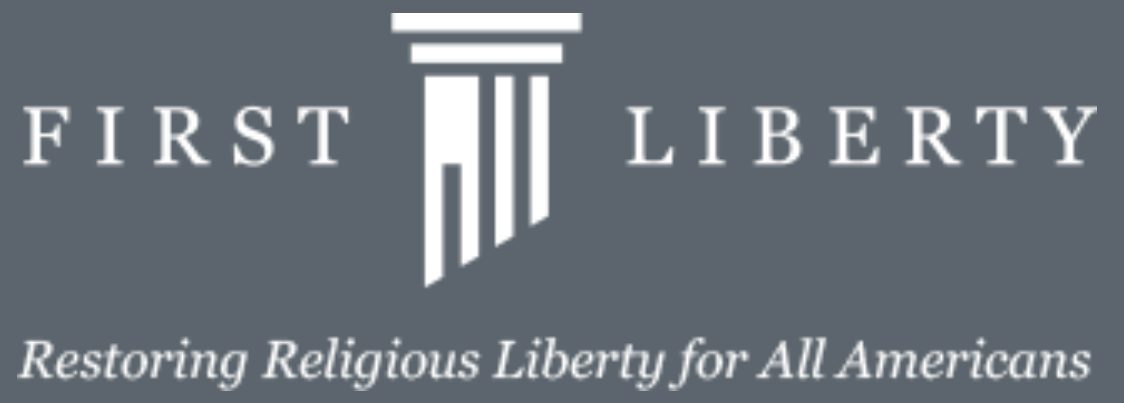
- Logo
- Formation: 1997; 29 years ago
- Type: 501(c)(3) nonprofit organization
- Tax ID no.: 75-1403169
- President, CEO: Kelly Shackelford
- Executive general counsel: Hiram Sasser
- Revenue: ▲$29,330,476 (2025); ▲$22,142,341 (2024)
- Expenses: $26,400,000 (2025)
- Funding: 98.5% charitable contributions
- Endowment: $25,300,000 (2025)
- Website: firstliberty.org

First Liberty Institute is a 501(c)(3) nonprofit Christian conservative legal organization based in Plano, Texas.

Prominent in legal circles on the Christian right, the organization litigates in First Amendment cases on religion, and is often referred to as a law firm.

First Liberty Institute is headed by Kelly Shackelford who founded the organization in 1997 under the name Liberty Legal Institute. The organization changed its name to Liberty Institute in 2009 and then, in 2016, to First Liberty Institute.

First Liberty Institute is a member of the advisory board of Project 2025, a collection of conservative and right-wing policy proposals from the Heritage Foundation to reshape the United States federal government and consolidate executive power should the Republican nominee win the 2024 presidential election.

== Prominent cases ==
First Liberty Institute is one of several Christian conservative legal organizations in the United States; others include the Alliance Defending Freedom, American Center for Law and Justice, Thomas More Society, Freedom of Conscience Defense Fund, Liberty Counsel, National Legal Foundation, and Christian Legal Society. The group has taken stances against LGBT rights. Among its most prominent cases are the "Candy Cane Case"; legal actions taken to stop a report on an investigation into Sarah Palin being published; and numerous legal cases filed in Texas courts concerning First Amendment and religious freedom issues.

List of Supreme Court cases:

- Sause v. Bauer, No. 17-742, 585 U.S. ___ (2018)
- American Legion v. American Humanist Association, No. 17-1717, 588 U.S. ___ (2019)
- Roman Catholic Archdiocese of San Juan v. Acevedo Feliciano, No. 18-921, 589 U.S. ___ (2020)
- Carson v. Makin, No. 20-1088, 596 U.S. ___ (2022)
- Kennedy v. Bremerton School District, No. 21-418, 597 U.S. ___ (2022)
- Groff v. DeJoy, No. 22-174, 600 U.S. ___ (2023)

=== Postal Worker Gerald Groff ===
First Liberty Institute represented Gerald Groff, a former United States Postal Service worker in rural Pennsylvania who was reprimanded and threatened with being fired for refusing to work on Sundays. Groff worked as a rural carrier associate. In 2013, USPS contracted with Amazon to deliver packages on Sundays. Groff’s Christian religious beliefs barred him from working on Sundays. Groff offered to work extra shifts, but the postmaster continued to schedule him on Sundays. Groff sued USPS for violations of his rights under federal law, arguing that he was wrongfully targeted because of his religious convictions.

A federal district court sided with USPS. The U.S. Court of Appeals for the Third Circuit affirmed the lower court’s ruling. Groff appealed his case to the U.S. Supreme Court. The Supreme Court heard oral argument in April 2023.

In June 2023, the Supreme Court ruled unanimously in favor of Groff. The Court’s decision changed the standard for religious accommodation in the workplace. The ruling set aside the "de minimis" standard set more than 45 years ago and laid out a clarified standard for lower courts to apply to determine when, under Title VII of the Civil Rights Act, an employee's proposed religious accommodation imposes an undue hardship on the employer's business. Groff’s case was sent back to the lower courts for reconsideration. The Supreme Court’s decision has been widely praised by religious organizations.

=== Coach Joe Kennedy ===
First Liberty Institute represented high school football coach Joseph A. Kennedy in a lawsuit against the Bremerton School District in the state of Washington. The dispute centers around the dismissal of the coach after a school policy conflict pertaining to his practice of a prayer after each game. The Supreme Court initially declined to hear the case in January 2019. In March 2020, a federal district court ruled against Kennedy. In January 2022, the Supreme Court agreed to hear the case. In April 2022, the Supreme Court heard oral argument in the case. In June 2022, the Supreme Court ruled in favor of the coach. In a 6-3 ruling, the Court held that the school district discriminated against Coach Kennedy and that his prayers are protected by the Constitution's guarantees of free speech and religious exercise.

=== Maine tuition program ===
First Liberty, alongside the Institute for Justice, represented three families in the Supreme Court case Carson v. Makin. The case centered around the limits of school vouchers offered by state governments to pay for religious-based private schools. A Maine law excluded religious schools from a state tuition program, which pays for students to attend private schools. In December 2021, the Supreme Court heard oral argument in the case. In June 2022, the Supreme Court ruled 6–3 in favor of the three families, holding that Maine's exclusion of religious schools from otherwise generally available tuition assistance programs violated the Free Exercise Clause. The case was remanded to a lower court for further proceedings.

=== Oregon cake bakers ===
First Liberty represents Aaron and Melissa Klein, who owned a family bakery in Oregon, Sweet Cakes by Melissa. In 2013, they declined to design and create a custom wedding cake to celebrate a same-sex wedding because doing so would violate their religious beliefs. In 2015, the Oregon Bureau of Labor and Industries found the couple had violated the state's nondiscrimination statutes and ordered them to pay $135,000 in compensatory damages. That decision was reaffirmed by a ruling from the Oregon Court of Appeals in 2017. In 2018, the case was appealed to the U.S. Supreme Court. In 2019, the U.S. Supreme Court vacated the ruling and directed the Oregon court to review its decision in the wake of Masterpiece Cakeshop, Ltd. v. Colorado Civil Rights Commission, which favored a Colorado baker who also declined to serve a same-sex couple because of his religious beliefs. In January 2022, the Oregon Court of Appeals, for a second time, held that the Kleins had illegally discriminated against the same-sex couple, but ordered the state to reconsider the monetary damages.

=== Veterans memorials ===
First Liberty Institute has litigated veterans memorial cross cases. Among these cases was the Bladensburg WWI Veterans Memorial case. The American Humanist Association sued to remove the memorial claiming it was in violation of the U.S. Constitution because it was in the shape of a cross. In June 2019, the U.S. Supreme Court ruled in American Legion v. American Humanist Association upholding the cross memorial, citing that it did not violate the Establishment Clause. In previous years, the Freedom From Religion Foundation, the ACLU, and the American Humanist Association have challenged other similar veterans memorial cross cases.

=== Dr. Eric Walsh ===
First Liberty Institute represented Dr. Eric Walsh in a lawsuit against the Georgia Department of Health (DPH), which hired Walsh in 2014 as a public health director for northwest Georgia, but fired him one week later after reviewing his Seventh-Day Adventist sermons. Walsh alleged that Georgia DPH unlawfully discriminated against him based on religion. The state settled the case for $225,000.

=== U.S. Navy SEALs ===
After the U.S. Department of Defense announced its COVID-19 mandate in August 2021, First Liberty filed a lawsuit against the Navy and the Department on behalf of 35 Navy SEALs. The suit alleged that the service members had faced a range of military discipline for declining to take the COVID-19 vaccine due to their religious beliefs. In January 2022, a U.S. District Judge issued a preliminary injunction, blocking the Navy and the Department of Defense from punishing the service members and enforcing the vaccine mandate. The SEALs’ lawsuit was subsequently expanded to a class-action that included all Navy service members with religious objections to the vaccine mandate. In March 2022, the U.S. Supreme Court issued an order affirming the Biden administration's authority to make deployment decisions based on vaccination status.

The U.S. Navy reached a settlement in July 2024, which brought an end to nearly four years of litigation. Under the agreement, Navy personnel who refused the vaccine for religious reasons would have their records corrected and be protected against discrimination on promotion boards. The Navy agreed to review the records of all plaintiffs to ensure that the service expunged any information on administrative separation, counseling or nonjudicial punishment for failing to comply with the mandate. The Navy also agreed to correct the records of members who left the service and post a public statement "affirming the Navy's respect for religious service members."

First Liberty Institute, alongside law firm Schaerr Jaffe LLP, also filed a lawsuit against the Department of Defense and the Air Force on behalf of several U.S. Air Force service members. The suit alleged that the Department of Defense violated the First Amendment by denying several service members a religious exemption to the COVID-19 vaccine mandate.

=== Religious expression for military service members ===
First Liberty frequently represents members of the U.S. military in religious freedom disputes.

First Liberty represented Stephanie Carter, a U.S. Army veteran and nurse practitioner at the Olin E. Teague Veterans Center in Temple, Texas. Carter sued the U.S. Department of Veterans Affairs over its decision to offer abortion services in certain cases and abortion counseling to veterans. Carter’s lawsuit claimed that the VA’s policies violated her sincerely-held religious beliefs, which prohibit her from participating in abortion procedures or services. She twice requested a religious accommodation but failed to obtain one. She was told that a religious exemption or accommodation process did not exist at the VA to review such requests. Carter’s lawsuit resulted in a nationwide religious accommodation process for all VA employees with religious objections to participating in abortion procedures, or any procedure they find unconscionable.

In 2011, First Liberty filed a lawsuit against the U.S. Department of Veterans Affairs alleging that the department had censored prayers and the use of the words "God" or "Jesus". The department's response was that its regulations stated that there is no censorship but that the religious preferences of the families of the deceased are respected and that at times families have complained about volunteers and the Veterans of Foreign Wars had included religious references in services even though the families had requested that there be none. The department's response said, "Defendants believe that it should be the family's choice and decision what to have read in accordance with their faith tradition, if any, because it would be improper for others to impose their own religious preferences on a Veteran's family, especially during this meaningful event". The case was settled in September 2012 after mediation by former Texas Supreme Court Chief Justice Thomas R. Phillips.

=== The "Candy Cane Case" ===
The "Candy Cane Case" began in 2004, after a student in Plano, Texas, was prohibited by school officials from distributing candy canes with a religious story attached at his school's Christmas party. In 2011, the U.S. Court of Appeals for the Fifth Circuit granted two school principals immunity in the case against the Plano Independent School District. The Liberty Institute appealed the case to the U.S. Supreme Court, which refused to hear the case in 2012, upholding the decision of the U.S. Court of Appeals for the Fifth Circuit.

=== Observant Jewish student accommodation ===
The University of Wisconsin refused to grant a freshman Observant Jewish student a religious accommodation so she could attend Sabbath services after sundown. After attorneys with the First Liberty Institute pointed out problems in the school’s policies and threatened to file First Amendment-based litigation, the administrators agreed to the accommodation.

== Center for Religion, Culture & Democracy ==
The Center for Religion, Culture & Democracy (CRCD) is the educational and research division of First Liberty Institute. Established as an initiative of the organization, the center conducts scholarship, educational programming, and public events focused on the relationship between religion, civil society, and democratic governance. The center's mission is to advance the role of religion as a public good in strengthening social institutions and preserving religious liberty through research, publications, and leadership development.

The CRCD publishes essays, reports, and an academic journal, and sponsors fellowships and seminars for students and early-career professionals. Its educational programs include the Shaftesbury Fellowship, which provides instruction and mentorship on topics including religious liberty, natural law, church–state relations, and constitutional government.

Among the center's principal research initiatives is Religious Liberty in the States, an annual index that compares state constitutional and statutory protections for the free exercise of religion across the United States. The project ranks states according to legal safeguards for religious liberty and is intended to provide a resource for policymakers, researchers, and the public.

The center is directed by theologian and scholar Jordan J. Ballor, who serves as its executive director.

== Prominent individuals ==
In November 2016, Ken Klukowski, First Liberty's senior counsel and director of strategic affairs was appointed to head the issue area of "Protecting Americans' Constitutional Rights" in the Donald Trump presidential transition team. Klukowski, later Senior Counsel to Assistant Attorney General Jeffrey Clark, was one of several Trump campaign officials subpoenaed in the Jan. 6 Select Committee investigation.

Matthew J. Kacsmaryk, who served as Deputy General Counsel to First Liberty Institute, and Jeff Mateer, who previously served as general counsel, were nominated in 2017 by President Trump for District Court positions. Mateer subsequently withdrew after a May 2015 speech where he referred to transgender children as "Satan's plan" became public. The Senate confirmed Kacsmaryk on June 19, 2019.

James C. Ho worked as a volunteer attorney at First Liberty prior to becoming a judge on the United States Court of Appeals for the Fifth Circuit.

Josh Hammer, editor at Newsweek and host of The Josh Hammer Show, served as Of Counsel at First Liberty prior to joining Newsweek.
