= Michelle M. Pettit =

American judge (born 1972)

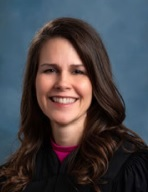

Magistrate Judge of the United States District Court for the Southern District of California
- Incumbent
- Assumed office July 24, 2023
- Preceded by: Mitchell Dembin

Personal details
- Born: Michelle Elise Montgomery; 1972 (age 53–54) Fredericksburg, Virginia, U.S.
- Education: United States Naval Academy (BS); Vanderbilt University (JD)

Military service
- Allegiance: United States
- Branch/service: United States Navy
- Years of service: 1994–2007; 2007–present
- Rank: Lieutenant commander (1994–2007); Captain (2007–present)
- Awards: See list: Meritorious Service Medal; Navy and Marine Corps Commendation Medal; Navy and Marine Corps Achievement Medal; Meritorious Unit Commendation; National Defense Service Medal; Southwest Asia Service Medal; Global War on Terrorism Service Medal; Sea Service Deployment Ribbon; Marksmanship Medal

Michelle Montgomery Pettit (born 1972) is an American lawyer who has served as a United States magistrate judge of the United States District Court for the Southern District of California since 2023. She is a former nominee to be a United States district judge of the same court.

== Education ==
Pettit earned her Bachelor of Science, with distinction, from the United States Naval Academy, and her Juris Doctor from Vanderbilt University Law School, where she was inducted into the Order of the Coif and served as Managing Editor of the Vanderbilt Law Review.

== Military service ==
From 1994 to 2007, Pettit served in the United States Navy, being honorably discharged Lieutenant commander. Since 2007 she has served in the United States Navy Reserve, achieving the rank of Captain. During her career in the Navy and Reserves she has held multiple positions: From 2001 to 2004, she served as assistant legal counsel, from 2004 to 2007, she served as senior trial counsel and head of the Command Services Department; from 2007 to 2010, she served as the reserve senior trial counsel; from 2010 to 2011, she served as a reserve appellate defense counsel; from 2011 to 2013, she served as the Reserve Executive Officer; from 2013 to 2015, she served as the Reserve Executive Officer and National Training Officer; then from 2015 to 2017, she served as a reserve appellate judge; from 2017 to 2019 she served as Reserve Commanding officer and Chief Trial Judge.

== Career ==
Pettit served as senior trial counsel for the United States Navy on active duty stationed in San Diego. Since 2015, Pettit has also served as a judge in the United States Naval Reserves. From 2008 to 2023, she served as an assistant United States attorney in the United States Attorney's Office for the Southern District of California, where she was a member of the National Security and Cybercrimes Section for eight years, where she served as the chief of the Intake Unit.

=== Expired nomination to district court ===
On September 20, 2019, President Donald Trump announced his intent to nominate Pettit to serve as a United States district judge for the United States District Court for the Southern District of California. On November 21, 2019, her nomination was sent to the Senate. President Trump nominated Pettit to the seat vacated by Judge Michael Anello, who assumed senior status on October 31, 2018. On January 3, 2020, her nomination was returned to the President under Rule XXXI, Paragraph 6 of the United States Senate. On February 13, 2020, her renomination was sent to the Senate. On January 3, 2021, her nomination was returned to the President under Rule XXXI, Paragraph 6 of the United States Senate.

=== Federal judicial service ===
On July 24, 2023, she was appointed as a United States magistrate judge of the United States District Court for the Southern District of California. She filled the vacancy left by the retirement of Magistrate Judge Mitchell Dembin.
