= Adam L. Braverman =

American lawyer

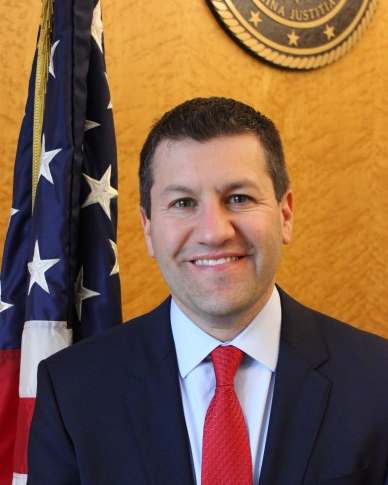

United States Attorney for the Southern District of California
- Interim
- In office November 16, 2017 – January 16, 2019
- Appointed by: Jeff Sessions
- Preceded by: Alana Robinson
- Succeeded by: Robert S. Brewer Jr.

Personal details
- Born: 1975 (age 50–51) Columbus, Ohio, U.S.
- Education: George Washington University (BA, JD)

Adam Lorne Braverman (born 1975) is an associate deputy attorney general at the United States Department of Justice who is a former nominee to be a United States district judge of the United States District Court for the Southern District of California.

== Education ==
Braverman received his Bachelor of Arts, cum laude, from George Washington University and his Juris Doctor from George Washington University Law School.

== Career ==
Upon graduation from law school, Braverman served as a law clerk to Judge Consuelo Callahan of the United States Court of Appeals for the Ninth Circuit and Judge Reggie Walton of the United States District Court for the District of Columbia. He was in private practice at Goodwin Procter LLP in Washington, D.C., where his practice focused on civil litigation, white-collar defense, and internal investigations.

=== United States attorney ===
Braverman previously served in the United States Attorney's Office for the Southern District of California, including as the United States attorney and as deputy chief of the Criminal Enterprise section. He was sworn in as U.S. Attorney on November 16, 2017. He left office on January 16, 2019, upon the swearing in of his successor, Robert S. Brewer Jr.

=== Expired nomination to district court ===
On August 28, 2019, President Donald Trump announced his intent to nominate Braverman to serve as a United States district judge for the United States District Court for the Southern District of California. On October 17, 2019, his nomination was sent to the Senate. President Trump nominated Braverman to the seat vacated by Judge Roger Benitez, who assumed senior status on December 31, 2017. On January 3, 2020, his nomination was returned to the President under Rule XXXI, Paragraph 6 of the United States Senate. On February 13, 2020, his renomination was sent to the Senate. On January 3, 2021, his nomination was returned to the President under Rule XXXI, Paragraph 6 of the United States Senate.

== See also ==
- List of Jewish American jurists
