= Jennifer H. Rearden =

American judge (born 1970)

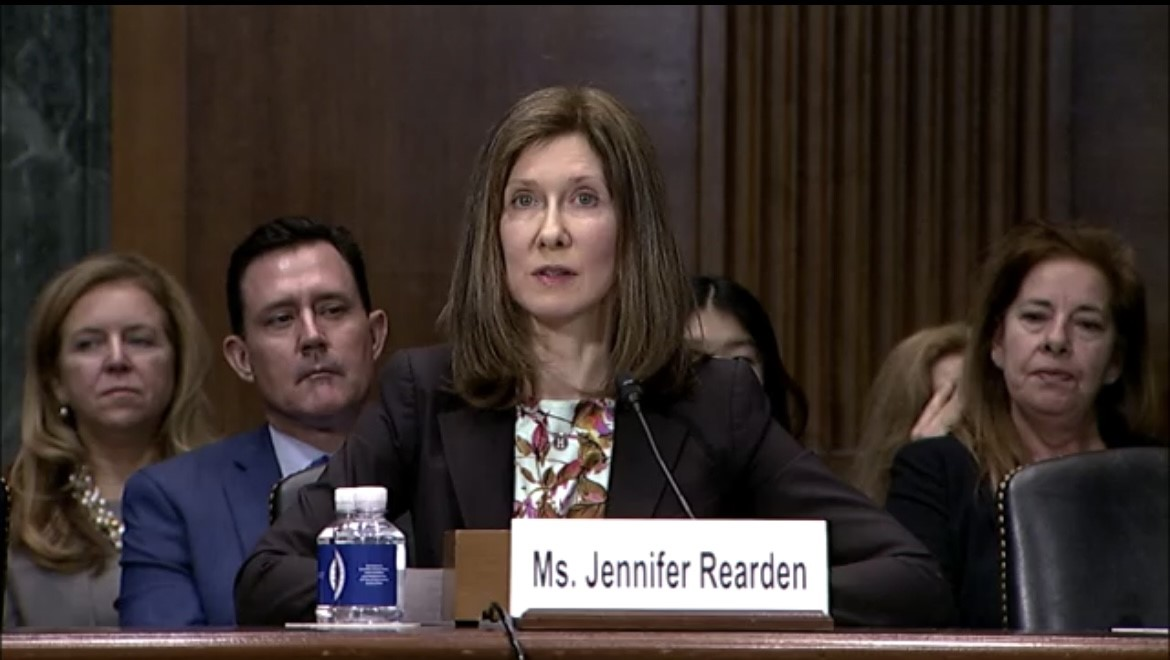

Judge of the United States District Court for the Southern District of New York
- Incumbent
- Assumed office October 7, 2022
- Appointed by: Joe Biden
- Preceded by: Richard J. Sullivan

Personal details
- Born: 1970 (age 55–56) New York City, U.S.
- Party: Democratic
- Education: Yale University (BA); New York University (JD)

Jennifer Hutchison Rearden (born in 1970) is an American lawyer from New York who is serving as a United States district judge of the United States District Court for the Southern District of New York

== Education ==
Rearden earned her Bachelor of Arts, magna cum laude, from Yale University in 1992, and her Juris Doctor from New York University School of Law in 1996.

== Legal career ==
Rearden practiced at Davis Polk & Wardwell and in the Atlanta office of King & Spalding.

In 2003, she joined Gibson, Dunn & Crutcher in New York City, where she was a partner in the commercial litigation and crisis management practice groups. While working at the firm, she represented Chevron. She has litigated complex commercial cases before United States District Courts and state courts.

== Federal judicial service ==
=== Expired nomination to district court under Trump ===
On February 12, 2020, President Donald Trump announced his intent to nominate Rearden to serve as a United States district judge for the United States District Court for the Southern District of New York. She had been strongly recommended by U.S. Senator Kirsten Gillibrand and was nominated as part of a bipartisan package of judicial nominees. On May 4, 2020, her nomination was sent to the Senate. President Trump nominated Rearden to the seat vacated by Judge Richard J. Sullivan, who was elevated to the United States Court of Appeals for the Second Circuit on October 25, 2018. On January 3, 2021, her nomination was returned to the President under Rule XXXI, Paragraph 6 of the United States Senate.

=== Renomination to district court under Biden ===
On January 19, 2022, President Joe Biden nominated Rearden to serve as a United States district judge of the United States District Court for the Southern District of New York. She was renominated to the same seat as her previous nomination. Rearden's nomination was criticized by Representative Rashida Tlaib (D-MI), who brought up Rearden's controversial role in the prosecution of Steven Donziger. Rearden represented Chevron in its countersuit against Donziger, an environmental lawyer who brought a class action case against Chevron related to environmental damage and health effects caused by oil drilling. On March 2, 2022, a hearing on her nomination was held before the Senate Judiciary Committee. On April 4, 2022, her nomination was reported out of committee by a 22–0 vote. On September 8, 2022, the United States Senate confirmed her nomination by a voice vote. After the Senate confirmed her nomination, U.S. Senator Elizabeth Warren said that she would have voted "no" if the Senate had conducted a roll call vote on Rearden's nomination. She received her judicial commission on October 7, 2022.

== See also ==
- Joe Biden judicial appointment controversies

Legal offices
Preceded by Richard J. Sullivan	United States District Court for the Southern District of New York; 2022–present	Incumbent
