= 1982 United States House of Representatives elections in South Carolina =

- November 2, 1982

All 6 South Carolina seats to the United States House of Representatives
	Majority party	Minority party
Party	Democratic	Republican
Last election	2	4
Seats won	3	3
Seat change	▲1	▼1
District results
Democratic
50–60%
60–70%
>90%
Republican
50–60%
60–70%

The 1982 United States House of Representatives elections in South Carolina were held on November 2, 1982, to select six Representatives for two-year terms from the state of South Carolina. The primary elections for the Democrats were held on June 8 and the runoff elections were held two weeks later on June 22. Three incumbents were re-elected, but John Light Napier of the 6th congressional district was defeated in his bid for re-election and the open seat in the 5th congressional district was retained by the Democrats. The composition of the state delegation after the elections was three Republicans and three Democrats.

== 1st congressional district ==
Incumbent Republican Congressman Thomas F. Hartnett of the 1st congressional district, in office since 1981, defeated Democratic challenger W. Mullins McLeod.

=== Democratic primary ===
Democratic primary
Candidate	Votes	%
Paul Cantrell	17,897	47.2
W. Mullins McLeod	17,285	45.5
Ben Frasier	2,765	7.3

Democratic primary runoff
Candidate	Votes	%	±%
W. Mullins McLeod	14,398	77.5	+32.0
Ben Frasier	4,174	22.5	+15.2

=== General election results ===
South Carolina's 1st congressional district election results, 1982
Party	Candidate	Votes	%	±%
Republican	Thomas F. Hartnett (incumbent)	63,894	54.3	+2.7
Democratic	W. Mullins McLeod	52,813	44.9	−3.5
Libertarian	Walter E. Smith	971	0.8	+0.8
No party	Write-Ins	9	0.0	0.0
Majority		11,081	9.4	+6.2
Turnout		117,687		
Republican hold				

== 2nd congressional district ==
Incumbent Republican Congressman Floyd Spence of the 2nd congressional district, in office since 1971, defeated Democratic challenger Ken Mosely.

=== Democratic primary ===
Democratic primary
Candidate	Votes	%
Ken Mosely	16,561	44.4
Billy R. Oswald	12,395	33.2
Harvey W. Burgess	8,375	22.4

Democratic primary runoff
Candidate	Votes	%	±%
Ken Mosely	17,800	57.4	+13.0
Billy R. Oswald	13,202	42.6	+9.4

=== General election results ===
South Carolina's 2nd congressional district election results, 1982
Party	Candidate	Votes	%	±%
Republican	Floyd Spence (incumbent)	71,569	58.5	+2.8
Democratic	Ken Mosely	50,749	41.5	−2.8
No party	Write-Ins	6	0.0	0.0
Majority		20,820	17.0	+5.6
Turnout		122,324		
Republican hold				

== 3rd congressional district ==
Incumbent Democratic Congressman Butler Derrick of the 3rd congressional district, in office since 1975, defeated Libertarian challenger Gordon T. Davis.

=== General election results ===
South Carolina's 3rd congressional district election results, 1982
Party	Candidate	Votes	%	±%
Democratic	Butler Derrick (incumbent)	77,125	90.4	+30.6
Libertarian	Gordon T. Davis	8,214	9.6	+8.8
No party	Write-Ins	18	0.0	0.0
Majority		68,911	80.8	+60.4
Turnout		85,357		
Democratic hold				

== 4th congressional district ==
Incumbent Republican Congressman Carroll A. Campbell Jr. of the 4th congressional district, in office since 1979, defeated Democratic challenger Marion E. Tyus.

=== General election results ===
South Carolina's 4th congressional district election results, 1982
Party	Candidate	Votes	%	±%
Republican	Carroll Campbell (incumbent)	69,802	63.2	−29.4
Democratic	Marion E. Tyus	40,394	36.6	+36.6
No party	Write-Ins	171	0.2	−0.1
Majority		29,408	26.6	−58.9
Turnout		110,367		
Republican hold				

== 5th congressional district ==
Incumbent Democratic Congressman Kenneth Lamar Holland of the 5th congressional district, in office since 1975, opted to retire. John M. Spratt, Jr. won the Democratic primary and defeated Republican John S. Wilkerson in the general election.

=== Democratic primary ===
Democratic primary
Candidate	Votes	%
John M. Spratt, Jr.	28,472	38.2
John Winburn	19,865	26.6
Ernie Nunnery	19,522	26.2
Bill Horne	6,729	9.0

Democratic primary runoff
Candidate	Votes	%	±%
John M. Spratt, Jr.	30,859	54.9	+16.7
John Winburn	25,302	45.1	+18.5

=== General election results ===
South Carolina's 5th congressional district election results, 1982
Party	Candidate	Votes	%	±%
Democratic	John M. Spratt, Jr.	69,345	67.6	−19.9
Republican	John S. Wilkerson	33,191	32.4	+32.4
No party	Write-Ins	3	0.0	0.0
Majority		36,154	35.2	−39.8
Turnout		102,539		
Democratic hold				

== 6th congressional district ==
Incumbent Republican Congressman John Light Napier of the 6th congressional district, in office since 1981, was defeated in his bid for re-election by Democrat Robin Tallon.

=== Democratic primary ===
Democratic primary
Candidate	Votes	%
Robin Tallon	35,841	46.9
Hicks Harwell	19,816	25.9
John W. Brassington	12,698	16.6
Charles McGill	8,124	10.6

Democratic primary runoff
Candidate	Votes	%	±%
Robin Tallon	40,836	70.6	+23.7
Hicks Harwell	17,017	29.4	+3.5

=== General election results ===
South Carolina's 6th congressional district election results, 1982
Party	Candidate	Votes	%	±%
Democratic	Robin Tallon	62,582	52.5	+4.3
Republican	John Light Napier (incumbent)	56,653	47.5	−4.2
No party	Write-Ins	2	0.0	−0.1
Majority		5,929	5.0	+1.5
Turnout		119,237		
Democratic gain from Republican				

== See also ==
- 1982 United States House of Representatives elections
- 1982 South Carolina gubernatorial election
- South Carolina's congressional districts
