= Judge Hodges =

Judge Hodges may refer to:

- Robert H. Hodges Jr. (born 1944), judge of the United States Court of Federal Claims
- William Terrell Hodges (1934–2022), judge of the United States District Court for the Middle District of Florida
