= Robert J. Yock =

American judge (born 1938)

Robert Yock
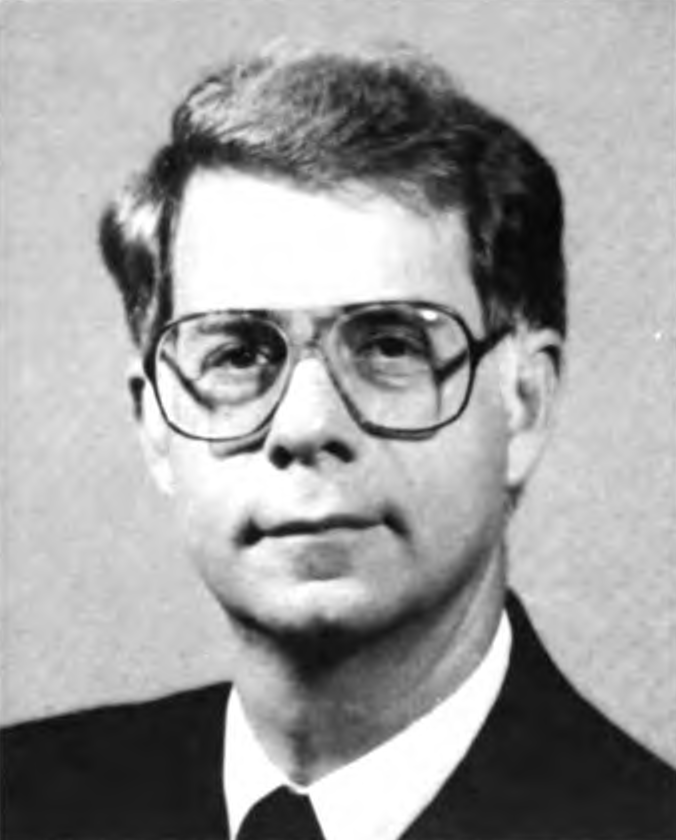

Senior Judge of the United States Court of Federal Claims
- Incumbent
- Assumed office August 4, 1998

Judge of the United States Court of Federal Claims
- In office October 1, 1982 – August 4, 1998
- Appointed by: Ronald Reagan
- Preceded by: Seat established
- Succeeded by: Emily C. Hewitt

Personal details
- Born: January 11, 1938 (age 88) St. James, Minnesota, U.S.
- Party: Republican
- Spouse: Carla Moen (m. 1964)
- Children: 2
- Education: St. Olaf College (BA); University of Michigan (JD)

Military service
- Allegiance: United States
- Branch/service: United States Navy
- Years of service: 1962–1966

Robert J. Yock (born January 11, 1938) is a senior judge of the United States Court of Federal Claims.

== Early life, education, and career ==
Born in St. James, Minnesota to Dr. William J. and Erma (Fritz) Yock, Yock attended St. Olaf College, graduating with a Bachelor of Arts in 1959. He received a Juris Doctor in 1962 from the University of Michigan Law School. He then served in the United States Navy from 1962 to 1966, in the Judge Advocate General's Corps.

Yock entered private practice in 1966, in St. Paul, Minnesota. In 1969 he joined the General Services Administration as Chief Counsel of the National Archives and Record Service, becoming executive assistant and legal advisor to the administrator in 1970 and assistant general counsel from 1972 to 1977.

=== Claims court service ===
In 1977, Yock became a trial judge for the United States Court of Claims. On October 1, 1982, became a judge of the United States Court of Federal Claims by operation of law, following the passage of the Federal Courts Improvement Act of 1982. On June 20, 1983, Yock was nominated by President Ronald Reagan to a full fifteen-year term on the court. He was confirmed by the United States Senate on August 4, 1983, and received his commission on August 5, 1983. Federal Trade Commissioner Maureen Ohlhausen was one of Yock's law clerks from 1991 to 1992. Yock transitioned to senior status on August 5, 1998, and is currently inactive.

== Personal life ==
Yock married Carla M. Moen on June 13, 1964, with whom he has two children, Signe Kara and Torunn Ingrid.

Legal offices
New seat	Judge of the United States Court of Federal Claims; 1982–1998	Succeeded by Emily C. Hewitt
