= John Paul Wiese =

American judge (born 1934)

John Wiese
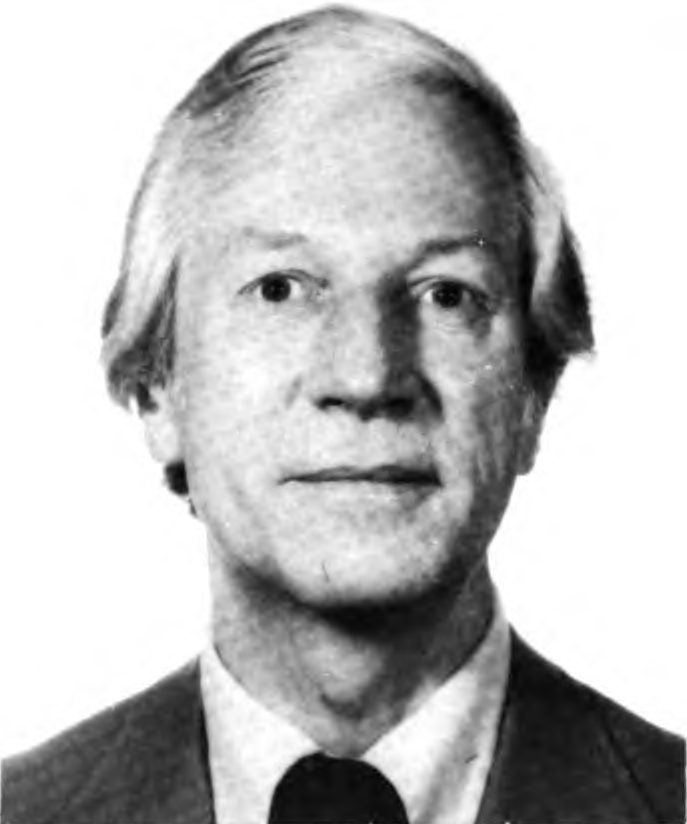

Senior Judge of the United States Court of Federal Claims
- Incumbent
- Assumed office October 13, 2001

Judge of the United States Court of Federal Claims
- In office October 1, 1982 – October 13, 2001
- Appointed by: Ronald Reagan
- Preceded by: Seat established
- Succeeded by: Charles F. Lettow

Personal details
- Born: John Paul Wiese; April 19, 1934 (age 92) New York City, New York, U.S.
- Party: Democratic
- Spouse: Alice Donoghue (m. 1961)
- Children: 1
- Education: Hobart College (BA); University of Virginia (LLB)

Military service
- Allegiance: United States
- Branch/service: United States Army
- Years of service: 1957–1959

John Paul Wiese (born April 19, 1934) is a senior judge of the United States Court of Federal Claims.

== Early life, education, and career ==
John Paul Wiese was born on April 19, 1934, in Brooklyn New York City, New York, to Gustav and Margaret Wiese. He graduated from Hobart College with a Bachelor of Arts in 1962, and from the University of Virginia School of Law with a Bachelor of Laws in 1965.

Wiese served in the United States Army from 1957 to 1959. He served as a staff law clerk in the Trial Division of the United States Court of Claims from 1965 to 1966 and as law clerk to Judge Linton M. Collins in the Appellate Division of the United States Court of Claims from 1966 to 1967. Thereafter, he engaged in the private practice of law with the firms of Cox, Langford & Brown from 1967 to 1969 and Hudson, Creyke, Koehler & Tacke from 1969 to 1974. From 1974 to 1982 he served on the United States Court of Claims as a trial commissioner.

=== Claims court service ===
Wiese was appointed a judge of the United States Court of Federal Claims on October 1, 1982, by operation of law, following enactment of the Federal Courts Improvement Act. He was nominated for a full fifteen year appointment by Ronald Reagan on September 11, 1986, and was confirmed by the United States Senate on October 8, 1986, and received commission on October 14, 1986. He assumed senior status on October 13, 2001.

Legal offices
New seat	Judge of the United States Court of Federal Claims; 1982–2001	Succeeded by Charles F. Lettow
