= George Willi =

American judge (1924–2016)

Senior Judge of the United States Court of Federal Claims
- In office December 14, 1982 – December 4, 1985

Judge of the United States Court of Federal Claims
- In office October 1, 1982 – December 14, 1982
- Appointed by: operation of law
- Preceded by: seat established
- Succeeded by: seat abolished

Personal details
- Born: May 1, 1924 New York City, U.S.
- Died: September 26, 2016 (aged 92) Harrisonburg, Virginia, U.S.
- Education: University of Wisconsin (BBA, LLB)

George Willi III (May 1, 1924 – September 26, 2016) was a judge of the United States Court of Claims from 1965 to 1982, and of the United States Court of Federal Claims from 1982 to 1985.

Willi was born in New York City. He served in the U.S. Army Air Forces during World War II, from 1943 to 1946, achieving the rank of captain. He then received a Bachelor of Business Administration from the University of Wisconsin in 1950 and a Bachelor of Laws from the University of Wisconsin Law School the same year. He was a Carriers' attorney for the National Railroad Adjustment Board from 1950 to 1951, and a trial attorney in the Tax Division of the U.S. Department of Justice from 1951 to 1963, thereafter entering private practice in Washington, D.C., in 1964.

In 1965, Willi became a trial judge of the U.S. Court of Claims. On October 1, 1982, Willi was appointed by operation of the Federal Courts Improvement Act, 96 Stat. 27, to a new seat on the United States Court of Claims. In 2003, Judge Alex Kozinski wrote in an article on his tenure as chief judge of the Court of Claims:

George Willi was in the building finishing off an opinion – I think he was still there when I left more than three years later – and he would stop in my office every so often to offer me sage, though often cryptic, advice: "No point plucking two chickens with one hand tied behind your back." I wasn't always quite sure what he meant, but gave him a knowing nod and he'd go back to writing up his opinion, long-hand. For all I know, he's still at it.

Willi assumed senior status on December 14, 1982, and then resigned from the court entirely on January 4, 1985. Willi was one of several judges originally assigned to the U.S. Court of Federal Claims for whom no successor was appointed.
