= United States v. Paul =

United States v. Paul may refer to:

- United States v. Paul, 31 U.S. (6 Pet.) 141 (1832), crimes under state law committed on federal property

== See also ==
- Paul v. United States, 20 Cl. Ct. 236 (1990), advising Congress whether payment to an individual was required
