= Joseph V. Colaianni =

American judge (1933–2018)

Joseph Colaianni
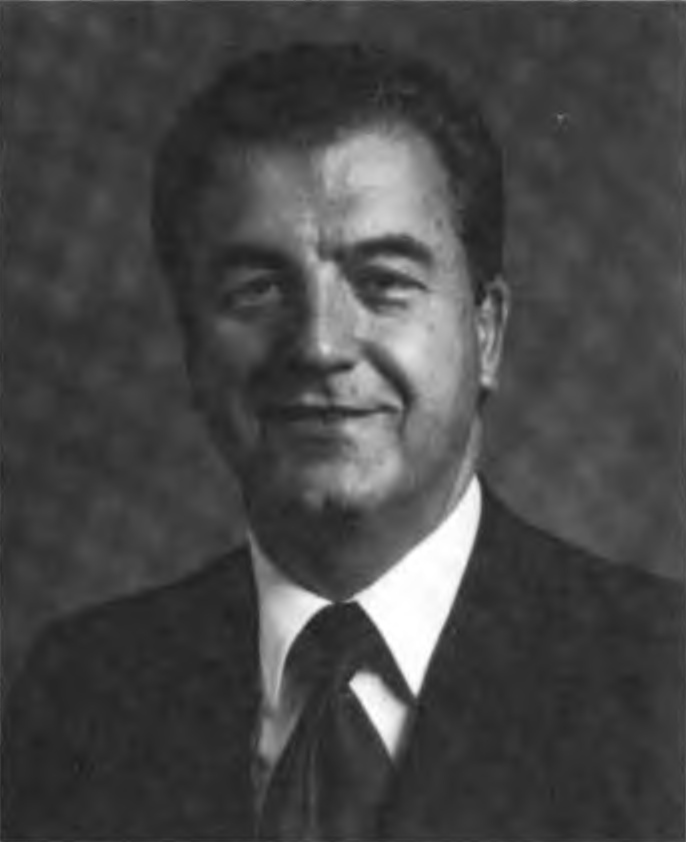

Judge of the United States Court of Federal Claims
- In office October 1, 1982 – June 8, 1984
- Preceded by: Seat established
- Succeeded by: Loren A. Smith

Personal details
- Born: March 19, 1933; Detroit, Michigan, U.S.
- Died: June 26, 2018 (aged 85); Washington, D.C., U.S.
- Political party: Republican
- Education: University of Detroit (BS); George Washington University (JD)

Joseph Vincent Colaianni (March 19, 1933 – June 26, 2018) was a trial commissioner of the United States Court of Claims, and a judge of its successor, the United States Court of Federal Claims from 1982 to 1984.

Born in Detroit, Michigan, Colaianni received a Bachelor of Science in Electrical Engineering from the University of Detroit (now University of Detroit Mercy) in 1956, and a Juris Doctor from the George Washington University Law School in 1961. He entered private practice in Detroit from 1961 to 1962, then in Toledo, Ohio from 1962 to 1963, and then in Cleveland, Ohio from 1963 to 1966. He then served as a trial attorney in the Civil Division of the U.S. Department of Justice from 1966 to 1970.

In 1970, Colaianni was appointed as a trial commissioner of the U.S. Court of Claims. On October 1, 1982, he was appointed by operation of law to a new seat on the United States Court of Federal Claims pursuant to the Federal Courts Improvement Act, 96 Stat. 27. He resigned from the court on June 8, 1984, returning to private practice in Washington D.C. He died on June 26, 2018, aged 85.
