= Judith Ann Yannello =

American judge (1943–2019)

Judith Yannello
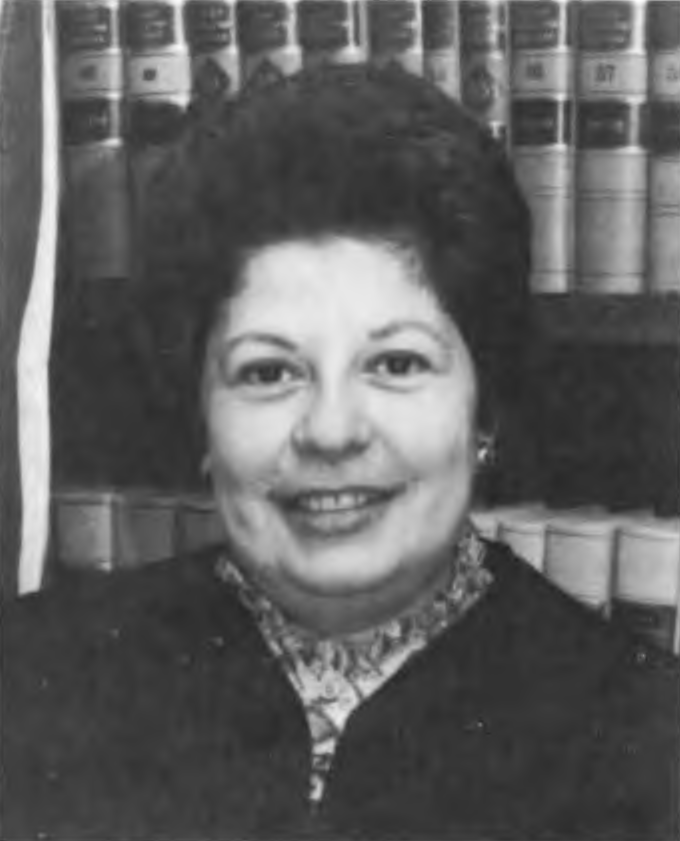

Judge of the United States Court of Federal Claims
- In office October 1, 1982 – May 31, 1987
- Preceded by: Seat established
- Succeeded by: Wilkes C. Robinson

Personal details
- Born: March 27, 1943; Buffalo, New York, U.S.
- Died: July 20, 2019 (aged 76); Charlottesville, Virginia, U.S.
- Political party: Independent
- Education: Columbia University (BA); Cornell University (JD)

Judith Ann Yannello (March 27, 1943 – July 20, 2019) was an American jurist who served as a judge of the Armed Services Board of Contract Appeals and the United States Court of Federal Claims from 1976 to 1996.

Yannello was born in Buffalo, New York. She received a Bachelor of Arts from Barnard College in 1964, followed by a Juris Doctor from Cornell Law School in 1967. She was a law clerk on the U.S. Court of Claims from 1967 to 1968, and then a trial attorney in the Civil Division of the U.S. Department of Justice from 1968 to 1973, when she entered private practice in Washington, D.C.

In 1976, Yannello became an administrative judge on the Armed Services Board of Contract Appeals, and in 1977, she became a trial judge of the U.S. Court of Claims. On October 1, 1982, she was reassigned by operation of law under the Federal Courts Improvement Act to the newly created U.S. Claims Court. She resigned from the Claims Court on May 31, 1987, and returned to the Armed Services Board of Contract Appeals, where she continued to serve until 1996.

Yannello died at her home in Charlottesville, Virginia, on July 20, 2019, at the age of 76.
