= Paul v. United States =

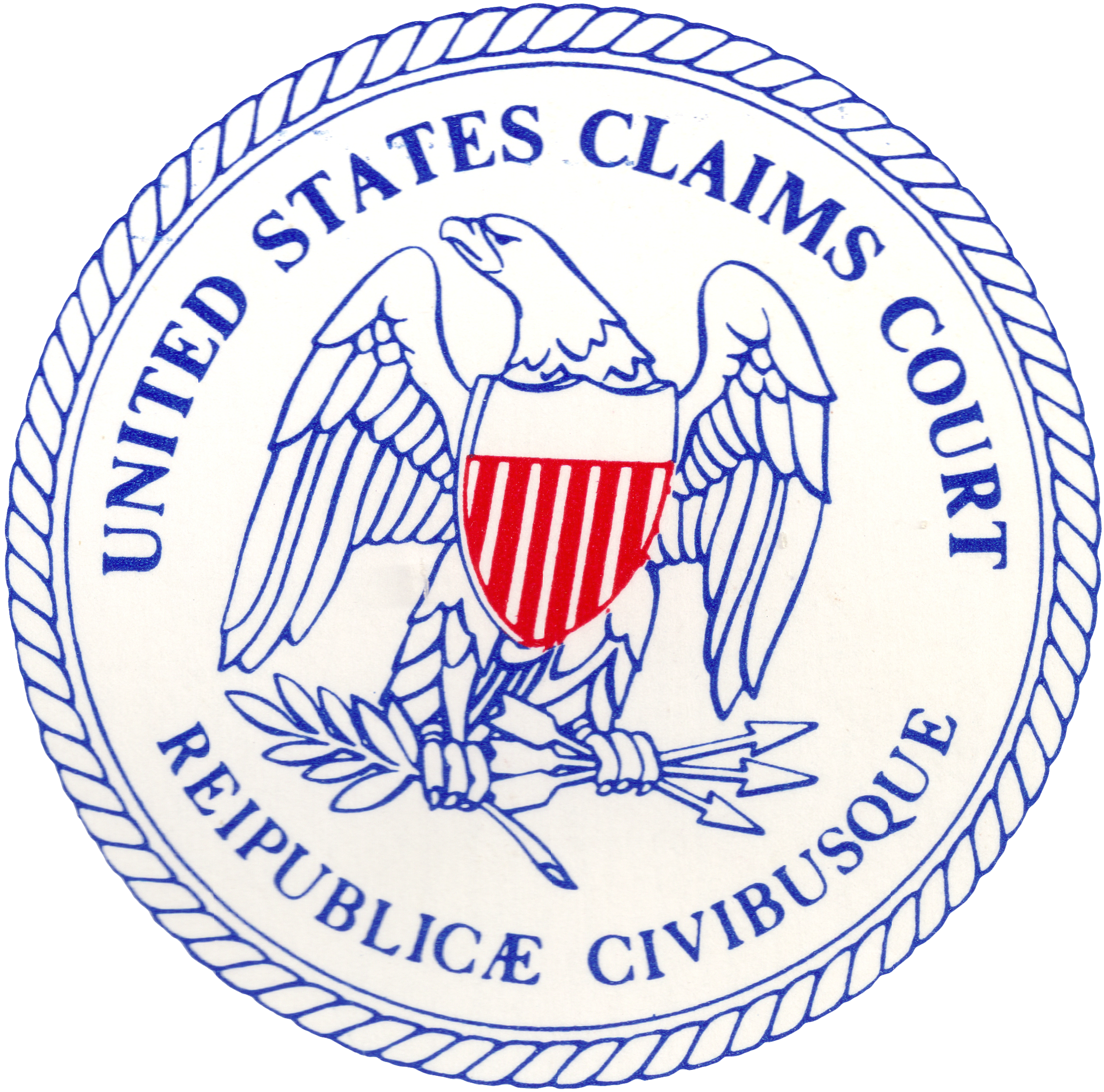
- Court: United States Claims Court
- Full case name: Frederick Paul v. United States
- Decided: April 23, 1990
- Citation: 20 Cl.Ct. 236 (1990)

Case history
- Prior actions: Arctic Slope Native Ass'n v. Paul, 609 P.2d 32 (Alaska, 1980); Paul v. United States, No. C77-399V, (W.D.Wash); Paul v. Andrus, 639 F.2d 507 (9th Cir.1980); Paul v. United States, 687 F.2d 364, 231 Ct.Cl. 445 (1982), cert. denied, 461 U.S. 927, 103 S.Ct. 2086, 77 L.Ed.2d 297 (1983); Jackson v. United States, 485 F.Supp. 1243 (D.Alaska, 1980).
- Subsequent actions: 21 Cl.Ct. 758 (1990) (affirming HOR in part and finding that any payment would be a gratuity).

Court membership
- Judge sitting: Kenneth R. Harkins

Case opinions
- That Paul did not have a legal or equitable claim to the money and if Congress did grant him the money, it would be as payment of an equitable claim and not as a gratuity.

Paul v. United States, 20 Cl.Ct. 236 (1990), was a Congressional reference case brought before the United States Claims Court as a result of Senate Resolution 187 of the 100th Congress' 1st Session in 1988, which referred the proposed private bill, S. 966 to the court for a report on whether Frederick Paul's claim was a legal, equitable, or gratuitous claim and what amount was legally or equitably due to him by the United States. Paul claimed he was due additional money from the government for his work with the native Inuit of Alaska that led to the passage of the Alaska Native Claims Settlement Act in 1971 and the creation of the modern borough system of local government in Alaska.

The hearing officer held that while Paul did not have a legal or equitable claim to the money, if Congress did grant him the money, it would be as payment of an equitable claim and not as a gratuity. The review panel to the case agreed that there was no legal or equitable claim, but held that any payment would be a gratuity. Subsequently, Congress failed to act on the proposed bill before Mr. Paul's death in 1994.

== Background ==
In 1966, natives from the Alaskan Arctic Slope villages of Kaktovik, Nooiksat, Barrow, Wainwright, Point Lay, Point Hope, Anaktuvuk Pass, Meade River, Wood's Camp and Colville joined together to form the Arctic Slope Native Association (ASNA) to represent their land interests to the Bureau of Indian Affairs (BIA). While Frederick Paul was not the organization's initial legal representative, he was appointed as a representative shortly after and sought to negotiate a contract with the BIA for his services on behalf of the natives. However, the Bureau rejected his proposed contract as it was not sure if the ASNA was an actual organization and because it disagreed with Paul receiving a percentage of any eventual recovery.

Despite the BIA's rejection, Paul submitted a substantially similar contract to the ASNA, which signed it. The Bureau notified him that the contract was not valid and subsequently he re-executed the same contract with seven of the eight villages comprising the ASNA. The Bureau again denied the contracts citing that they were not the same form as the standard contract and that the rate should be three times the usual hourly rate and not a percentage of the eventual recovery.

During this time, Paul made substantial efforts on behalf of the ASNA to ensure the natives received money for the land of the Arctic Slope that was being sold to various oil concerns, culminating in the passage of the Alaska Native Claims Settlement Act of 1971 (ANCSA), which provided over forty-six million dollars and several million acres of land to the natives in compensation for their land claims. It also provided for the attorneys who had assisted the natives in preparing their claims to receive up to 1.9 million dollars if they filed a request for payment within one year of the law's passage. Paul claimed he was due over 10 million dollars, later reducing the claim to 5.9 million and then having a court find the amount at 3.6 million. However, during the distribution of the 1.9 million dollars, Paul was only paid two-hundred seventy-five thousand dollars and continued to seek further remuneration, filing a suit in 1974 in Alaska against ANSA and the cities he had contracted with. This resulted in a judgment for twenty-thousand dollars to Paul. Paul then filed a claim in the Western District of Washington for the same claim in 1976, only to have the court dismiss it in light of the statute of limitations.

In 1977 Paul sued the United States in the Court of Claims arguing that the ANCSA had unconstitutionally infringed on his contract. That suit was dismissed by the court for failing to state a claim that the court could render a judgment under. Also in 1977, Paul sued the United States, the villages and several associations in Alaska federal court for his own fees and the fees of other attorneys. The court dismissed this claim citing that they were not contracts made under the ANCSA or claims that could be paid otherwise. Paul re-filed suit against the United States, ASNA, and eight villages for fees in the Western District of Washington during the same year, only to have the court suspend the case in light of the other pending litigation.

== Congressional reference ==
Paul appealed to his congressman and his senators for the passage of a reference resolution to empower the Claims Court to hear his dispute. Despite the introduction of resolutions in the 98th (Senate Resolution 432 and House Resolution 571) and 99th (S. Res. 78 and H. Res. 61) Congresses, no action was taken. Finally, in 1998, Senate Resolution 187 was approved, which directed the Claims Court to report on whether Paul's claim was a legal, equitable, or gratuitous claim and what amount was legally or equitably due him by the United States.

== Holding ==
In a detailed holding, Hearing Officer Kenneth Harkins examined the court's entire Congressional reference jurisdiction and found that the court was not required to view the resolution as being favorable towards Paul, that the legal theories of res judicata and stare decisis do not apply to Congressional reference cases, and that any findings of the court are merely advisory to Congress.

Harkins found that there was no legal grounds for the government to pay Paul, and that even under the wider Congressional concept of "broad moral principles of right and justice", there were not equitable grounds for payment to Paul. Harkins also found that in such cases, "equitable" can have two meanings, both the traditional meaning of "equity at law" and the broader meaning of "upon considerations of a moral or merely honorary nature". He stated that under the traditional theory of equity, there was no action possible, as equity deals with things "such as reformation of contracts, or mandamus orders to government officials who have failed to follow statutory commands", and this was a request for payment of money. Even under the broader theory of equity as a "moral action", Harkins did not find a duty to pay him additional funds. However, he did hold that if Congress were to pay him funds in light of his contributions to the development of native government, it would be as an equitable claim and not a gratuity.

== Review panel ==
Paul appealed the hearing officer's report to a review panel consisting of Judges James T. Turner, Bohdan A. Futey, and Roger Andewelt of the Claims Court. He claimed that Harkins was incorrect in holding he lacked a broader equitable claim against the United States under the Congressional reference sense of the term.

The panel held that Harkins was accurate in holding there was no legal or equitable claim under any sense of the words and further held that Harkins was incorrect in holding that payment of the claim would be payment of an equitable claim. The panel instead held that if Congress were to pay the claim, it would be as a gratuity, due to the poor record keeping that supported the amount of his claim and for the other reasons that the hearing officer put forward.

Following the review panel report, Congress did not take action towards paying Frederick Paul and he died in 1994 as a pauper due to tax seizures.
