= Margaret M. Sweeney =

American judge (born 1955)

Margaret Sweeney
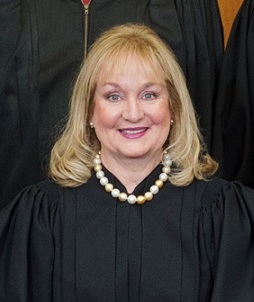
- Sweeney in 2017

Senior Judge of the United States Court of Federal Claims
- Incumbent
- Assumed office October 23, 2020

Chief Judge of the United States Court of Federal Claims
- In office July 12, 2018 – October 19, 2020
- Appointed by: Donald Trump
- Preceded by: Susan G. Braden
- Succeeded by: Eleni M. Roumel

Judge of the United States Court of Federal Claims
- In office October 24, 2005 – October 23, 2020
- Appointed by: George W. Bush
- Preceded by: Robert H. Hodges Jr.
- Succeeded by: Carolyn N. Lerner

Personal details
- Born: 1955 (age 70–71) Baltimore, Maryland, U.S.
- Education: Notre Dame of Maryland University (BA); Widener University, Delaware (JD)

Margaret Mary Sweeney (born 1955) is a senior judge of the United States Court of Federal Claims, appointed to that court in 2005 by President George W. Bush. She served as chief judge from July 12, 2018, to October 19, 2020.

== Early life, education, and career ==
Born in Baltimore, Maryland, Sweeney received a Bachelor of Arts in history from Notre Dame of Maryland in 1977, and Juris Doctor from Delaware Law School in 1981.

Sweeney served as a Delaware Family Court Master presiding over cases involving domestic relations matters from 1981 to 1983. She then became a litigation associate from with the firm of Fedorko, Gilbert, & Lanctot, in Morrisville, Pennsylvania, until 1985, handling civil and criminal cases, including commercial litigation, personal injury, domestic relations, real property and estates. From 1985 to 1987, she served as law clerk to Loren A. Smith, Chief Judge of the United States Court of Federal Claims.

From 1987 to 2003, Sweeney served in the United States Department of Justice, first as a trial attorney in the General Litigation Section of the Environment and Natural Resources Division until 1999, and then as an Attorney Advisor for the Office of Intelligence Policy and Review. In the latter position, she prepared applications and motions on behalf of various United States intelligence agencies for presentation to the Foreign Intelligence Surveillance Court. Sweeney then served as a Special Master for the United States Court of Federal Claims from 2003 to 2005.

=== Claims court service ===
On October 24, 2005, Sweeney was appointed a judge of the United States Court of Federal Claims by President George W. Bush. She was confirmed by the United States Senate on October 21, 2005, and received her commission on October 24, 2005. She took her seat on December 14, 2005. On July 12, 2018, President Donald Trump designated her as chief judge. and she served in that capacity until October 19, 2020. She assumed senior status on October 23, 2020.

== Memberships ==
Sweeney is a member of the bars of the Supreme Court of Pennsylvania and the District of Columbia Court of Appeals. In 1999, she served as President of the United States Court of Federal Claims Bar Association. Sweeney and her family reside in the Washington metropolitan area.

Legal offices
Preceded by Robert H. Hodges Jr.	Judge of the United States Court of Federal Claims; 2005–2020	Succeeded by Carolyn N. Lerner
Preceded by Susan G. Braden	Chief Judge of the United States Court of Federal Claims; 2018–2020	Succeeded by Eleni M. Roumel
