= Eleni M. Roumel =

American judge (born 1974)

Eleni Roumel
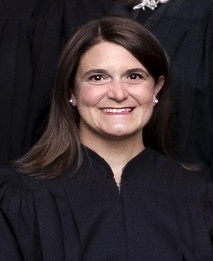

Chief Judge of the United States Court of Federal Claims
- In office October 19, 2020 – March 2, 2021
- Appointed by: Donald Trump
- Preceded by: Margaret M. Sweeney
- Succeeded by: Elaine D. Kaplan

Judge of the United States Court of Federal Claims
- Incumbent
- Assumed office February 24, 2020
- Appointed by: Donald Trump
- Preceded by: Mary Ellen Williams

Personal details
- Born: 1974 (age 51–52) Washington, D.C., U.S.
- Education: Wake Forest University (BA); Tulane University (JD, MBA)

Eleni Maria Roumel (born 1974) is a judge of the United States Court of Federal Claims. She is the first Greek American woman to serve as a federal judge in the United States. She was designated as chief judge by President Donald Trump on October 19, 2020, and served in that capacity until March 2, 2021. She previously served as deputy counsel to Vice President Mike Pence.

== Early life and education ==
Roumel is of Greek heritage and was born in Washington, D.C. She graduated from Wake Forest University in 1996 with a Bachelor of Arts cum laude. She received her Juris Doctor magna cum laude from Tulane Law School, where she served as Notes and Comments Editor of the Tulane Law Review and graduated with Order of the Coif honors. Roumel earned her Master of Business Administration from Tulane University's A.B. Freeman School of Business in 2000.

== Career ==
Roumel began her career as an associate at Skadden Arps Slate Meagher & Flom in New York City. She then served as a law clerk to Judge William H. Pauley III of the United States District Court for the Southern District of New York. Roumel was then an associate at Wilmer Cutler Pickering Hale and Dorr in New York. From 2006 to 2012, Roumel practiced at Nelson Mullins Riley & Scarborough, eventually becoming a partner. She also taught intellectual property law as an adjunct professor the Charleston School of Law. In 2012, Roumel became an Assistant General Counsel for the United States House of Representatives. She left the office in 2018 to become Deputy Counsel to Vice President Mike Pence. Roumel left the White House in 2020, upon becoming a judge.

=== Claims court service ===
On June 11, 2019, President Donald Trump announced his intent to nominate Roumel to serve as a judge of the United States Court of Federal Claims. On June 24, 2019, her nomination was sent to the Senate. President Trump nominated Roumel to the seat vacated by Judge Mary Ellen Coster Williams, who assumed senior status on July 13, 2018. On July 17, 2019, a hearing on her nomination was held before the Senate Judiciary Committee. On October 17, 2019, her nomination was reported out of committee by a 12–10 vote. On January 8, 2020, the United States Senate invoked cloture on her nomination by a 51–44 vote. Her nomination was confirmed later that day by a 51–47 vote. She received her judicial commission on February 24, 2020. Vice President Mike Pence swore in Roumel on February 24, 2020, at a White House ceremony. She was designated as chief judge by Trump on October 19, 2020 and served in that capacity until March 2, 2021, when she was replaced by Judge Elaine D. Kaplan, whom was appointed by President Joe Biden. Roumel is the first Greek-American woman to serve as a federal judge.

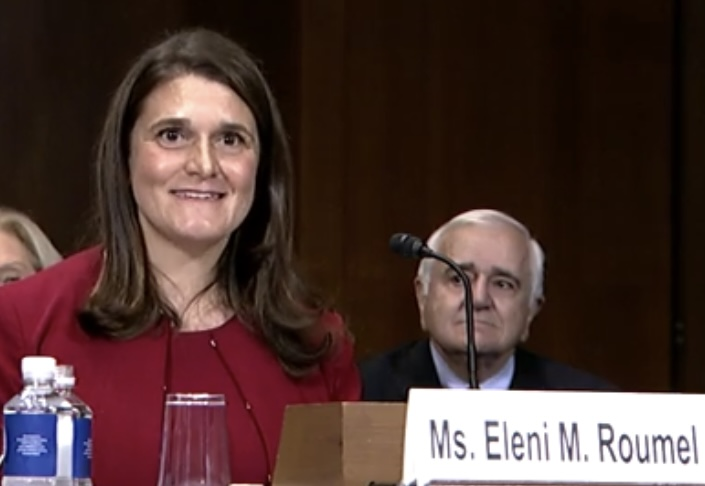
Eleni Roumel answers questions at a Senate Judiciary Committee hearing on her nomination to the U.S. Court of Federal Claims.

== Memberships ==
Roumel has been a member of the Federalist Society since approximately 2013. She was also a member of the James L. Petigru American Inn of Court and a Congressional Fellow at Stanford University's Hoover Institution. Roumel serves on the Administrative Conference of the United States and as a Judicial Counselor on the Giles S. Rich American Inn of Court.

Legal offices
Preceded by Mary Ellen Williams	Judge of the United States Court of Federal Claims; 2020–present	Incumbent
Preceded by Margaret M. Sweeney	Chief Judge of the United States Court of Federal Claims; 2020–2021	Succeeded by Elaine D. Kaplan
