= Kathryn C. Davis =

American judge (born 1978)

Kathryn Davis
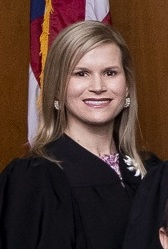
- Davis in 2022

Judge of the United States Court of Federal Claims
- Incumbent
- Assumed office December 16, 2020
- Appointed by: Donald Trump
- Preceded by: Charles F. Lettow

Personal details
- Born: 1978 (age 47–48) Miami, Florida, U.S.
- Education: Boston University (BS); Temple University (JD)

Kathryn Celia Davis (born 1978) is an American lawyer who serves as a judge of the United States Court of Federal Claims.

== Education ==
Davis earned a Bachelor of Science from Boston University and a Juris Doctor, cum laude, from the Temple University Beasley School of Law.

== Career ==
During 2001–2002, she was a project assistant at Jones Day. From 2003–2004, Davis was a law clerk to Judge Rayford Means of the Philadelphia County Court of Common Pleas, Criminal Trial Division. In the summer of 2004 she was a summer associate at McKissock & Hoffman and then from 2005–2007, she worked as an associate for the same firm. From 2007–2008, Davis was an associate at Burns White. From 2008–2020, Davis was a lawyer at the United States Department of Justice. She joined the United States Department of Justice Civil Division in 2008 as a trial attorney and served as senior counsel in the Federal Programs Branch from 2014–2020. Since 2018 she has been a professorial lecturer in law at the George Washington University Law School, where she teaches a course in legal research and writing.

=== Claims court service ===
On October 16, 2019, President Donald Trump announced his intent to nominate Davis to serve as a judge of the United States Court of Federal Claims. On November 19, 2019, her nomination was sent to the United States Senate. President Trump nominated Davis to the seat on the United States Court of Federal Claims vacated by Judge Charles F. Lettow, who assumed senior status on July 13, 2018. On January 3, 2020, her nomination was returned to the President under Rule XXXI, Paragraph 6 of the Senate. On February 4, 2020, she was renominated to the same seat. A hearing on her nomination before the Senate Judiciary Committee was held on February 12, 2020. On May 14, 2020, her nomination was reported out of committee by a 12–10 vote. On December 2, 2020, the Senate invoked cloture on her nomination by a 51–44 vote. Her nomination was confirmed later that day by a 51–45 vote. She received her judicial commission on December 16, 2020. She was sworn into office on December 18, 2020.

Legal offices
Preceded by Charles F. Lettow	Judge of the United States Court of Federal Claims; 2020–present	Incumbent
