= Lawrence Baskir =

American judge (born 1938)

Larry Baskir
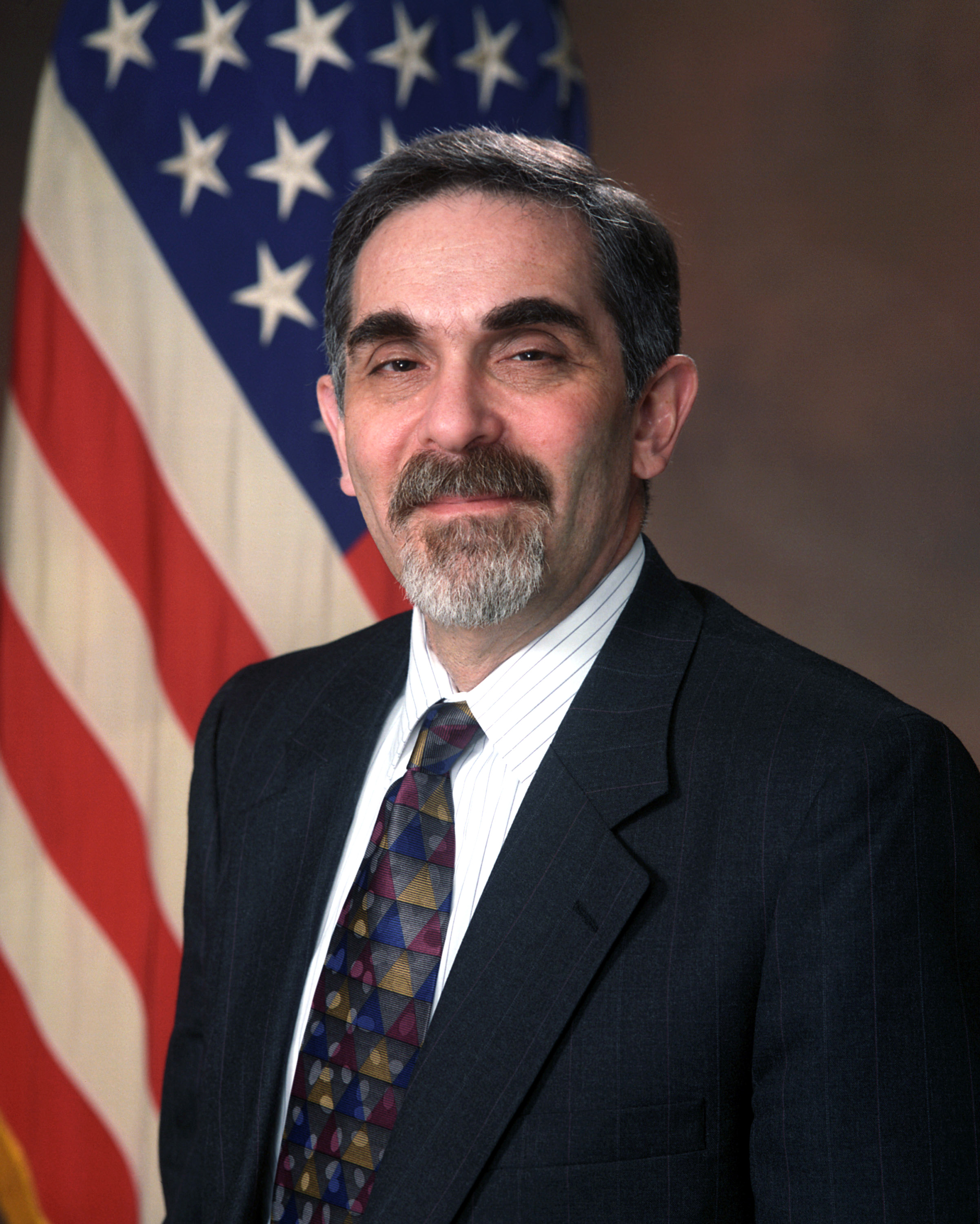
- Baskir in 1994

Senior Judge of the United States Court of Federal Claims
- Incumbent
- Assumed office April 2, 2013

Chief Judge of the United States Court of Federal Claims
- In office 2000–2002
- Preceded by: Loren A. Smith
- Succeeded by: Edward J. Damich

Judge of the United States Court of Federal Claims
- In office October 22, 1998 – April 2, 2013
- Appointed by: Bill Clinton
- Preceded by: Reginald W. Gibson
- Succeeded by: Patricia E. Campbell-Smith

Personal details
- Born: Lawrence Michael Baskir; January 10, 1938 (age 88) New York City, New York, U.S.
- Spouse: Marna Tucker
- Education: Princeton University (BA); Harvard University (LLB)

Military service
- Allegiance: United States
- Branch/service: United States Army
- Years of service: 1963–1968
- Rank: First Lieutenant

Lawrence Michael Baskir (born January 10, 1938) is a senior judge of the United States Court of Federal Claims who has served on the court since 1996. He was chief judge from 2000 to 2002 and a judge on the court from 1998 to 2013 before assuming senior status in 2013.

== Early life, education, and career ==
Baskir was born in Brooklyn, New York, receiving a Bachelor of Arts, magna cum laude, from the Woodrow Wilson School of Public and International Affairs at Princeton University in 1959 followed by a Bachelor of Laws from Harvard Law School in 1962. He was a United States Army Reserve first lieutenant in the JAG Corps from 1963 to 1968. Baskir than joined the United States Senate Committee on the Judiciary in 1965 and served till 1967 and then resumed service from 1969 to 1974 while becoming chief counsel and staff director from 1969 to 1974. He then was chief executive officer of the Presidential Clemency Board for The White House from 1974 to 1975. Baskir joined the Vietnam Project as a research professor and director at the university of Notre Dame Law School from 1975 to 1977. He was the Principal Deputy General Counsel for the United States Army from 1994 to 1998.

=== Claims court service ===
On January 7, 1997, Baskir was nominated by President Bill Clinton to a seat on the United States Court of Federal Claims vacated by Reginald W. Gibson. Baskir was confirmed by the United States Senate on October 21, 1998, and received his commission on October 22, 1998. He served as chief judge from 2000 to 2002. He assumed senior status on April 2, 2013.

== Personal life ==
Baskir is married to Marna Tucker and has two children.

Legal offices
Preceded by Reginald W. Gibson	Judge of the United States Court of Federal Claims; 1998–2013	Succeeded by Patricia E. Campbell-Smith
Preceded by Loren A. Smith	Chief Judge of the United States Court of Federal Claims; 2000–2002	Succeeded by Edward J. Damich
