= David A. Tapp =

American judge (born 1962)

David Tapp
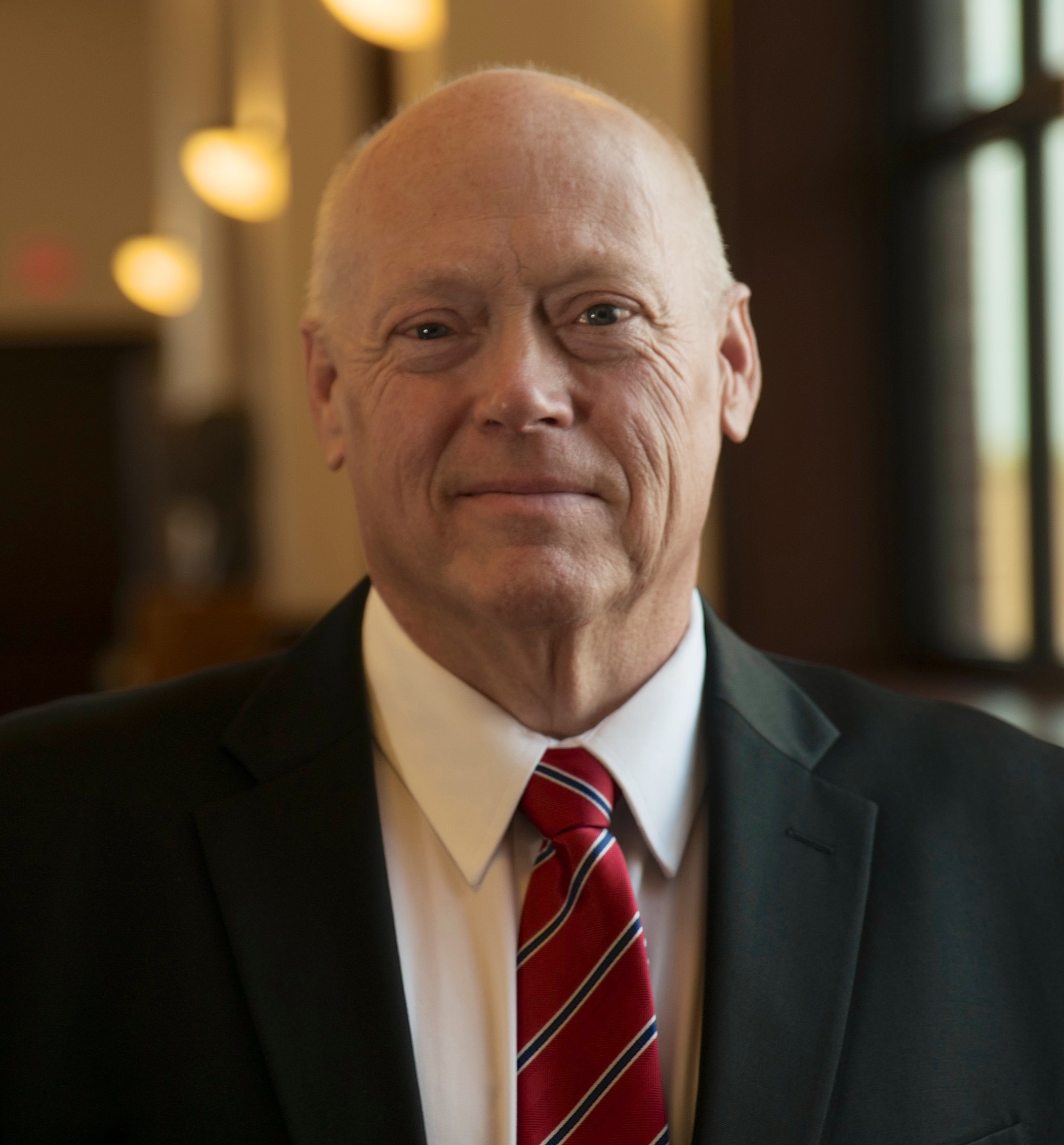
- Tapp in 2017

Judge of the United States Court of Federal Claims
- Incumbent
- Assumed office November 19, 2019
- Appointed by: Donald Trump
- Preceded by: Lynn J. Bush

Personal details
- Born: David Austin Tapp; 1962 (age 63–64) Lexington, Kentucky, U.S.
- Education: Morehead State University (BA); Chaminade University (MS); University of Louisville (JD)

David Austin Tapp (born 1962) is a judge of the United States Court of Federal Claims and a former circuit court judge from Kentucky.

== Education ==
Tapp received his Bachelor of Arts from Morehead State University, his Master of Science from the Chaminade University of Honolulu, and his Juris Doctor from the University of Louisville School of Law.

== Campaign for Kentucky Supreme Court ==
In 2017, he announced that he would run in 2018 for Justice Daniel J. Venters' seat on the Kentucky Supreme Court representing the 3rd Supreme Court district. Veters, whose term ended on January 6, 2019, announced in 2017 that he would not seek reelection. Tapp was defeated in the nonpartisan primary.

== Federal judicial service ==
On March 1, 2019, President Donald Trump announced his intent to nominate Tapp to a seat on the United States Court of Federal Claims. On March 5, 2019, his nomination was sent to the Senate. President Trump nominated Tapp to the seat vacated by Judge Lynn J. Bush, who assumed senior status on October 22, 2013. On May 22, 2019, a hearing on his nomination was held before the Senate Judiciary Committee. On June 20, 2019, his nomination was reported out of committee by a 18–4 vote. On November 5, 2019, the United States Senate invoked cloture on his nomination by a 83–9 vote. He was confirmed later that day by a 85–8 vote. He received his judicial commission on November 19, 2019, and took the oath of office on November 22, 2019.

In May 2024, NPR revealed that Tapp had received free travel in late 2021 to the Sage Lodge Colloquium, a privately funded legal seminar hosted at a resort in Montana's Paradise Valley, but had failed to disclose this on his annual financial disclosure form for that year, in violation of federal ethics law. In response, Tapp told NPR that he had "begun the process of preparing an amended report."

Legal offices
Preceded by Lynn J. Bush	Judge of the United States Court of Federal Claims; 2019–present	Incumbent
