= Wilkes C. Robinson =

American judge (1925–2015)

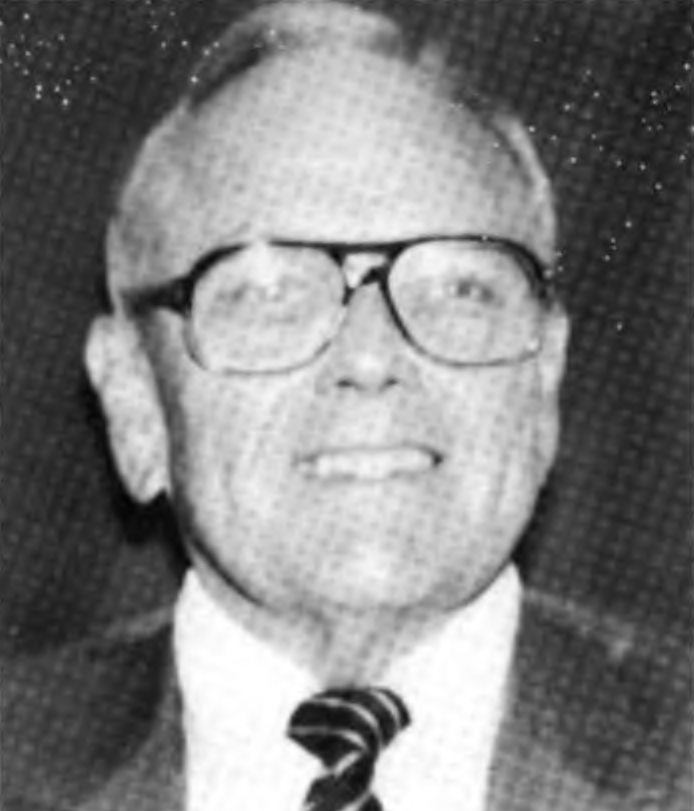

Senior Judge of the United States Court of Federal Claims
- In office July 31, 1997 – May 11, 2015

Judge of the United States Court of Federal Claims
- In office May 7, 1987 – July 31, 1997
- Appointed by: Ronald Reagan
- Preceded by: Judith Ann Yannello
- Succeeded by: Lynn J. Bush

Personal details
- Born: September 30, 1925 Anniston, Alabama, U.S.
- Died: May 11, 2015 (aged 89) Destin, Florida, U.S.
- Education: University of Alabama (AB); University of Virginia (LLB)

Wilkes Coleman Robinson (September 30, 1925 – May 11, 2015) was a judge of the United States Court of Federal Claims from 1987 to 1997.

== Early life, military service, and education ==
Born in Anniston, Alabama, Robinson was a U.S. Naval Reserve seaman first class during World War II, from 1943 to 1944. He received a Bachelor of Arts from the University of Alabama in 1948, and a Bachelor of Laws from the University of Virginia School of Law in 1951, where he was a member of Phi Beta Kappa, Phi Eta Sigma, Phi Alpha Theta, and the Kappa Alpha Order.

== Career ==
Following his graduation from law school, Robinson entered private practice in Anniston, becoming an associate attorney at the law firm of Bibb and Hemphill from 1953 to 1955, during which time he also served as the city recorder of Anniston, and sat as a judge for the Juvenile and Domestic Relations Court of Calhoun County, Alabama from 1954 to 1956.

Robinson then entered into corporate practice for a number of companies. From 1956 to 1958, he was an attorney for the Gulf, Mobile & Ohio Railroad Co., in Mobile, Alabama. He then served as commerce counsel and assistant general attorney for the Seaboard Airline Railroad Co. in Richmond, Virginia from 1958 to 1966, as chief commerce counsel for Monsanto Co. in St. Louis, Missouri from 1966 to 1970, and became general counsel for Marion Laboratories, Inc., in Kansas City, Missouri in 1970. In 1972, he also became a vice president of that company, holding that position until 1980, when he became president of the Gulf and Great Plains Legal Foundation in Kansas City, until 1985. He briefly returned to private practice in Kansas City from 1985 to 1986, but became vice president and general counsel to S.R. Financial Group, Inc., in Overland Park, Kansas, from 1986 to 1987.

=== Claims court service ===
On February 2, 1987, Robinson was nominated by President Ronald Reagan to a seat on the United States Court of Federal Claims vacated by Judith Ann Yannello. Confirmed by the United States Senate on May 7, 1987, Robinson received his commission on May 7, 1987, and assumed duties July 10, 1987. He assumed senior status on July 31, 1997.

== Personal life ==
Robinson died on May 11, 2015, at the age of 89.
