= Mary Ellen Coster Williams =

American judge (born 1953)

Mary Ellen Williams
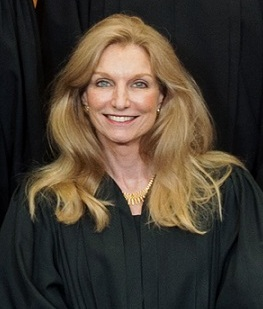
- Williams in 2017

Senior Judge of the United States Court of Federal Claims
- In office July 13, 2018 – July 31, 2023

Judge of the United States Court of Federal Claims
- In office July 14, 2003 – July 13, 2018
- Appointed by: George W. Bush
- Preceded by: Sarah L. Wilson
- Succeeded by: Eleni M. Roumel

Personal details
- Born: April 3, 1953 (age 72) New York City, New York, U.S.
- Education: Catholic University (BA, MA); Duke University (JD)

Mary Ellen Coster Williams (born April 3, 1953) is a former judge of the United States Court of Federal Claims, appointed to that court in 2003 by President George W. Bush.

== Early life, education, and career ==
Born and raised in Flushing, New York, Williams received a Bachelor of Arts in Latin and Greek and a Master of Arts in Latin, summa cum laude, from Catholic University in 1974. She received a Juris Doctor from the Duke University School of Law in 1977, having served on the editorial board of the Duke Law Journal.

Williams was an associate with Schnader Harrison Segal & Lewis from 1979 to 1983 and with Fulbright & Jaworski from 1977 to 1979. She served as an Assistant United States Attorney in the Civil Division of the Department of Justice in Washington, D.C., from 1983 until 1987. From 1987 to 1989, Williams was a partner in the law firm of Janis, Schuelke and Weschler, focusing on civil litigation. From March 6, 1989, to July 18, 2003, Williams served as an administrative judge on the General Services Administration Board of Contract Appeals, where she resolved federal government contract cases.

=== Claims court service ===
Williams was appointed to the United States Court of Federal Claims on July 21, 2003, by President George W. Bush. She assumed senior status on July 13, 2018. She retired on July 31, 2023.

== Memberships and other activities ==
Throughout her career, Williams has been active in bar associations and professional organizations. She has served on the board of governors of the American Bar Association, and from 2002 to 2003 she was the chair of the ABA's Section of Public Contract Law, having served as the section's chair-elect, vice chair, and secretary. She was the section's delegate to the ABA House of Delegates from 2003 to 2008. Williams also served as the section representative on the ABA Committee on Ethics and Professionalism and the ABA Commission on Evaluation of Rules of Professional Conduct from 1998 to 2000 and chaired the Ad Hoc Committee on Model Rules of Professional Responsibility of the Bar Association of D.C. in the early 1980s. From 2009 to 2010, she served on the ABA's Commission on Youth At Risk. She was a member of the ABA President's Task Force on Government Lawyers from 2000 to 2001 and was elected a Life Fellow of the American Bar Foundation in 1985. Williams has also served the Bar Association of the District of Columbia in many capacities, as its Foundation president, as a trustee, and as a member of its board of directors. In addition, Williams was chair of the D.C. Young Lawyers Section, secretary of the D.C. Bar, and a member of the Policy Board for Legal Counsel for the Elderly.

Williams has taught remedies and administrative law at the Columbus School of Law, Catholic University, since 2004, and also serves as an adjunct professor in the Advanced Academic Program for Law and Government at Johns Hopkins University, where she has taught intellectual property law, litigation with the federal government, government contracts, the American civil trial, and legal method. She has also lectured extensively on various legal topics, including civil trial practice and government contracts.

== Personal life ==
Williams is married and has two children.

Legal offices
Preceded by Sarah L. Wilson	Judge of the United States Court of Federal Claims; 2003–2018	Succeeded by Eleni M. Roumel
