= Sarah L. Wilson =

American judge (born 1959)

Sarah Wilson
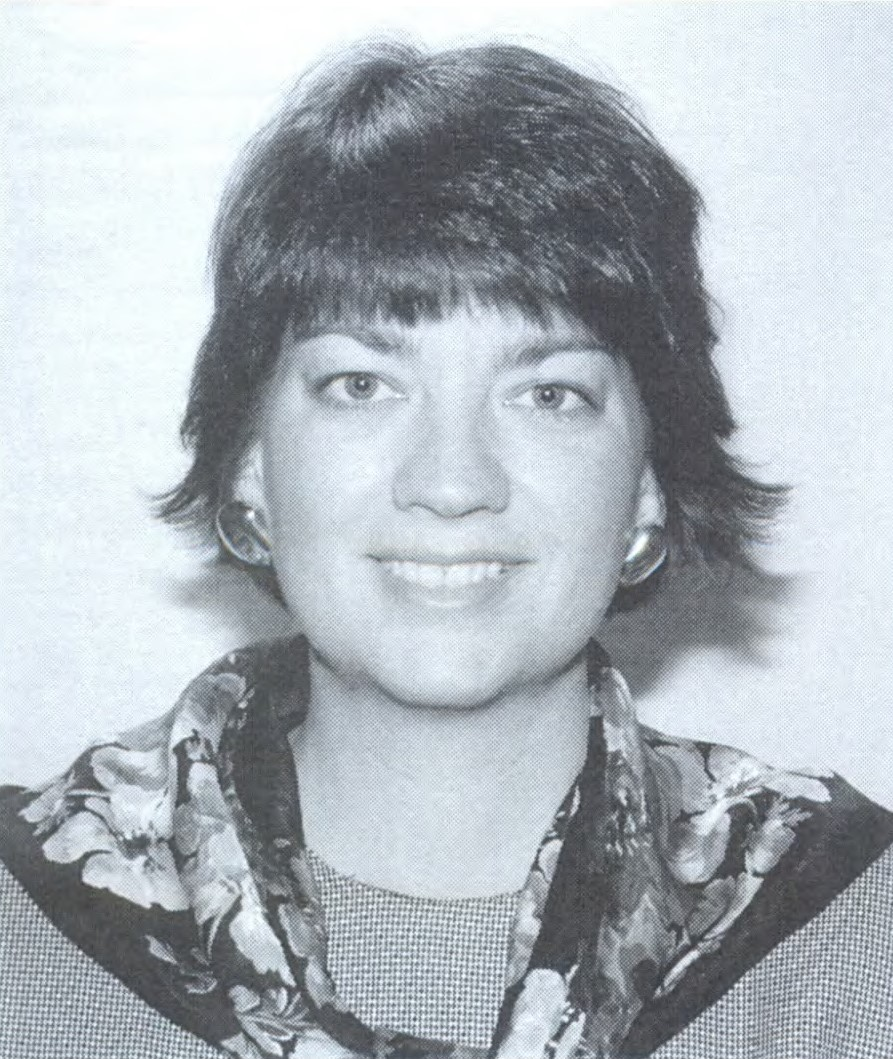
- Wilson in 1994

Judge of the United States Court of Federal Claims
- In office January 19, 2001 – November 22, 2002
- Appointed by: Bill Clinton
- Preceded by: Loren A. Smith
- Succeeded by: Mary Williams

Personal details
- Born: October 2, 1959 (age 65); New York City, New York, U.S.
- Relatives: Jerome L. Wilson
- Education: Williams College (BA); Yale University (MPhil); Columbia University (JD)

Sarah L. Wilson (born October 2, 1959) is a former judge of the United States Court of Federal Claims.

She received a Bachelor of Arts, cum laude, in 1981, from Williams College in Massachusetts, where she was a member of Phi Beta Kappa. She received a Master of Philosophy in American Studies from Yale University in 1986, and a Juris Doctor from Columbia Law School in 1990. She was a Harlan Fiske Stone Scholar and member of the Columbia Human Rights Law Review.

From 1990 to 1991, she served as law clerk to Judge Richard Leroy Williams of the United States District Court for the Eastern District of Virginia. She was a trial attorney in the Civil Division of the United States Department of Justice from 1991 to 1994 and again from 1996 to 1997, in the interim serving as a judicial fellow in the Federal Judicial Center from 1994 to 1995. She was deputy assistant attorney general in the Office of Policy Development from 1997 to 1998, and associate counsel and senior counsel to the President in the Office of the White House Counsel from 1998 to 2001.

On January 19, 2001, President Bill Clinton gave Wilson a recess appointment to a seat on the United States Court of Federal Claims. Wilson entered duty on January 22, 2001, but was not confirmed by the United States Senate, and her nomination to the position was not resubmitted by Clinton's successor, George W. Bush.

Wilson is the daughter of New York lawyer and politician Jerome L. Wilson. She is married to Louis Lappin, with whom she has two daughters, Kate and Elizabeth Lappin.

Legal offices
Preceded by Loren A. Smith	Judge of United States Court of Federal Claims; 2001–2002	Succeeded by Mary Williams
