= Emily C. Hewitt =

American judge (born 1944)

Emily Hewitt
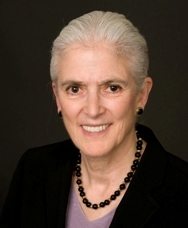

Chief Judge of United States Court of Federal Claims
- In office March 11, 2009 – October 21, 2013
- Appointed by: Barack Obama
- Preceded by: Edward Damich
- Succeeded by: Patricia E. Campbell-Smith

Judge of United States Court of Federal Claims
- In office November 10, 1998 – October 22, 2013
- Appointed by: Bill Clinton
- Preceded by: Robert J. Yock
- Succeeded by: Matthew H. Solomson

Personal details
- Born: May 26, 1944 (age 81) Baltimore, Maryland, U.S.
- Spouse: Eleanor Acheson
- Relatives: David Campion Acheson (father-in-law)
- Education: Cornell University (BA); Union Theological Seminary (MPhil); Harvard University (JD); Chicago Theological Seminary (DMin)

Emily Clark Hewitt (born May 26, 1944) is an American lawyer and minister who served as a judge and the chief judge of the United States Court of Federal Claims.

== Early life and education ==
Hewitt was born in Baltimore, Maryland. She graduated from the Roland Park Country School in Baltimore and in 1966, she earned a B.A. from Cornell University. She received a Master of Philosophy degree from the Union Theological Seminary of Columbia University in studies focusing on religion and education, and was ordained to the diaconate of the Episcopal Church in 1972.

== Career ==
=== Episcopal church and early career ===
Hewitt was one of the Philadelphia Eleven, the first eleven women ordained to the Episcopal priesthood on July 29, 1974. Hewitt served from 1973 to 1975 as assistant professor of religion and education at Andover Newton Theological School in Newton Centre, Massachusetts. She has also served as lecturer at the Union Theological Seminary and, from 1967 to 1969, as administrator of the Cornell/Hofstra Upward Bound Program at the Union Settlement House in East Harlem. She graduated with honors from Harvard Law School in 1978, where she was a member of the Harvard Legal Aid Bureau. She also holds a Doctor of Ministry degree from the Chicago Theological Seminary for studies focusing on liberty of conscience.

=== Law practice ===
Hewitt practiced from 1978 to 1993 with the Boston law firm Hill & Barlow. She was made a partner in 1985, and served as chair of Hill & Barlow's real estate department from 1987 to 1993. While with Hill & Barlow, Hewitt served on charitable, civic, and professional boards and committees and as a continuing education lecturer on real estate law.

=== Federal government work ===
Hewitt served as General Counsel of the United States General Services Administration from 1993 to 1998, overseeing the legal activities and responsibilities of the agency. She served as GSA's chief ethics official, as chief legal advisor to the Administrator and other GSA officials, and as a member of GSA's management committee. While at GSA, Hewitt served as a government member of the Administrative Conference of the United States and as a member of the President's Interagency Council on Women. She also served as a continuing education lecturer on procurement law reform, procurement integrity, alternative dispute resolution, and government law office management.

=== Claims court service ===
Hewitt was commissioned as a judge of the United States Court of Federal Claims by President Bill Clinton on October 22, 1998. In 2006, she was appointed by Chief Justice John G. Roberts to serve on the Financial Disclosure Committee of the Judicial Conference of the United States. President Barack Obama designated Hewitt to serve as Chief Judge on March 11, 2009. She served as chief judge until President Obama designated Patricia E. Campbell-Smith to serve as Chief Judge on October 21, 2013, at which time Hewitt's term as chief judge and 15-year term as a judge of the Court ended.

== Personal life ==
In addition to hundreds of legal opinions, Hewitt is the author or co-author of more than two dozen publications on legal and religious topics. Hewitt is an accomplished long distance race walker. She won a U.S. national race walking medal in 1987 and has won many national masters medals. She has walked more than a dozen marathons including the Boston, New York and United States Marine Corps Marathons. She is also an avid hiker of the National Park trails of the American West.

Hewitt is married to Eleanor D. Acheson (born 1947), who served as Assistant Attorney General of the United States during the Clinton administration.

== See also ==
- List of LGBT jurists in the United States

Legal offices
Preceded by Robert Yock	Judge of United States Court of Federal Claims; 1998–2013	Succeeded by Matthew H. Solomson
Preceded by Edward Damich	Chief Judge of United States Court of Federal Claims; 2009–2013	Succeeded by Patricia Campbell-Smith
