= Matthew H. Solomson =

American judge (born 1974)

Matt Solomson
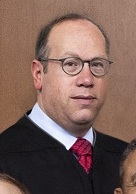
- Solomson in 2022

Chief Judge of the United States Court of Federal Claims
- Incumbent
- Assumed office April 10, 2025
- Appointed by: Donald Trump
- Preceded by: Elaine D. Kaplan

Judge of the United States Court of Federal Claims
- Incumbent
- Assumed office February 3, 2020
- Appointed by: Donald Trump
- Preceded by: Emily C. Hewitt

Personal details
- Born: Matthew Hillel Solomson; 1974 (age 50–51); Hartford, Connecticut, U.S.
- Education: Brandeis University (BA); University of Maryland, College Park (MBA); University of Maryland, Baltimore (JD)

Matthew Hillel Solomson (born 1974) is the chief judge of the United States Court of Federal Claims.

== Education ==
Solomson received his Bachelor of Arts, cum laude, from Brandeis University, a Master of Business Administration from the Robert H. Smith School of Business at the University of Maryland, and his Juris Doctor from the University of Maryland School of Law, where he was inducted into the Order of the Coif.

== Career ==
After graduating from law school, Solomson served as a law clerk to Judge Francis Allegra of the United States Court of Federal Claims.

Solomson worked as associate general counsel at Booz Allen Hamilton, in private practice at various Washington, D.C., law firms, including Sidley Austin, Skadden Arps, and Arnold & Porter, and as a trial attorney in the commercial litigation branch of the United States Department of Justice Civil Division. From 2015 to 2020, he served as the chief legal officer for the federal government solutions business unit of Anthem, Inc.

He is the author of Court of Federal Claims: Jurisdiction, Practice, and Procedure, published in 2016 by Bloomberg BNA.

=== Claims court service ===
On March 1, 2019, President Donald Trump announced his intent to nominate Solomson to a seat on the United States Court of Federal Claims. On March 5, 2019, his nomination was sent to the Senate. President Trump nominated Solomson to the seat vacated by Judge Emily C. Hewitt, who retired on October 22, 2013. On April 30, 2019, a hearing on his nomination was held before the Senate Judiciary Committee. On June 13, 2019, his nomination was reported out of committee by a 19–3 vote. On January 8, 2020, the United States Senate invoked cloture on his nomination by a 88–7 vote. His nomination was confirmed later that day by a 89–8 vote. He received his judicial commission on February 3, 2020. He was sworn in on February 4, 2020. On April 10, 2025, President Trump designated him as chief judge.

Legal offices
Preceded by Emily C. Hewitt	Judge of the United States Court of Federal Claims; 2020–present	Incumbent
Preceded by Elaine D. Kaplan	Chief Judge of the United States Court of Federal Claims; 2025–present	Incumbent
