= Susan G. Braden =

American judge (born 1948)

Susan Braden
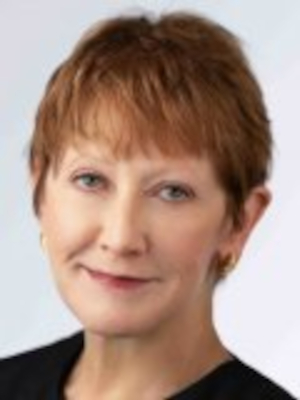

Senior Judge of the United States Court of Federal Claims
- In office July 13, 2018 – April 1, 2019

Chief Judge of the United States Court of Federal Claims
- In office March 13, 2017 – July 13, 2018
- Appointed by: Donald Trump
- Preceded by: Patricia E. Campbell-Smith
- Succeeded by: Margaret M. Sweeney

Judge of the United States Court of Federal Claims
- In office July 14, 2003 – July 13, 2018
- Appointed by: George W. Bush
- Preceded by: Roger Andewelt
- Succeeded by: Molly Silfen

Personal details
- Born: Susan Gertrude Braden; November 8, 1948 (age 77) Youngstown, Ohio, U.S.
- Education: Case Western Reserve University (BA, JD)

Susan Gertrude Braden (born November 8, 1948) is a former judge of the United States Court of Federal Claims. Braden was appointed to that court in 2003 by President George W. Bush. She was appointed chief judge by President Donald Trump on March 13, 2017 and assumed senior status on July 13, 2018, and retired in 2019.

== Early life, education, and career ==
Born in Youngstown, Ohio, Braden received a Bachelor of Arts from Case Western Reserve University in Cleveland, Ohio in 1970, and a Juris Doctor from the Case Western Reserve University School of Law in 1973. She also attended a post graduate course at the Harvard Law School in the summer of 1979. From 1973 to 1978, Braden worked for the Cleveland Field Office of the United States Department of Justice. She was a Senior Trial Attorney in the Department's Antitrust Division, Energy Section from 1978 to 1980. She then served as Senior Attorney Advisor to the Commissioner and Acting Chairman of the Federal Trade Commission from 1980 to 1983, and as Special Counsel to the chairman from 1984 to 1985.

=== Private practice and political activities ===
Braden entered private practice in 1985 and joined the law firm of Baker & McKenzie in 1997. She also served as a Special Assistant Attorney General for the State of Alabama in 1990. Braden litigated complex federal and administrative law cases in private practice in trial and appellate courts. In particular, her work in the intellectual property area received favorable notice in the Wall Street Journal, New York Times, National Law Journal, Journal of the American Bar Association, and Interfaces on Trial: Intellectual Property and Interoperability In The Global Software Industry. In 1996, Braden was honored by the Computer Law Association for winning multiple decisions in the Eastern District of New York, the Eastern District of Texas, the Second Circuit, and a certified question to the Supreme Court of Texas in Computer Assocs. Int'l, Inc. v. Altai Inc., a landmark case that changed the application of copyright law to computer software. In 1998, she also won a companion case brought in France before the Cour de Appel de Paris.

In private practice, Braden also represented a wide variety of client interests before almost every major department and federal agency, testified before the United States Congress on a variety of matters, and was a principal advocate of the Emergency Oil and Steel Loan Guarantee Act of 1999, which established a $1 billion federal loan guarantee program to assist bankrupt and troubled steel mills and small oil companies.

Braden was also active in support of the Republican Party, serving as Assistant General Counsel to the Republican National Conventions held in 1988, 1992, and 1996; serving on the National Steering Committee, Lawyers for Bush-Quayle, 1992; as Coordinator for Regulatory Reform and Antitrust Policy for the Dole Presidential Campaign from 1995 to 1996; Counsel for the RNC Platform in 1996; General Counsel for the Presidential Debate for the Dole-Kemp Campaign in 1996; and co-chair of Lawyers for Bush-Cheney in 2000. She was elected an At-Large Member of the D.C. Republican National Committee, serving 2000 to 2002.

=== Claims court service ===
On January 7, 2003, Braden was nominated by President George W. Bush to a fifteen-year term on the United States Court of Federal Claims. She was confirmed by unanimous consent of the United States Senate on July 9, 2003, and received her commission on July 14, 2003. She was sworn into office by Senator Jeff Sessions, then Chairman of the Senate Subcommittee on Administrative Oversight & the Courts. Her investiture was conducted on October 24, 2003, by Justice Sandra Day O'Connor and Justice Ruth Bader Ginsburg.

In July 2009, Braden was appointed as a Member of the Standing Committee on Ethics and Professional Responsibility-Judges Advisory Committee to the American Bar Association, on which she still serves. On February 14, 2007, Braden was elected as a Member of the American Law Institute and has been active in the Restatement of Law Third, Restitution and Unjust Enrichment Project. On October 22, 2004, she was inducted as a Senior Fellow of the ABA's Administrative Law and Regulatory Section by Justice O'Connor at a ceremony held at the United States Supreme Court.

On March 23, 2012, Braden received the Linn Inn Alliance Distinguished Service Medal at the New York Intellectual Property Law Association Annual Dinner for her work with the American Inns of Court, dedicated to intellectual property law. On February 7, 2012, Braden was appointed as Chair of the American Bar Association's Section of Intellectual Property Law Task Force on the creation of a Small Patent Claims Court. Braden was President of the Giles S. Rich American Inn of Court for the 2010-2011 Term. She was recognized at a ceremony in the United States Supreme Court in November 2011, when she received the American Inns of Court Platinum Distinction Award for her service. Braden also has been a Member of the editorial board of the American Intellectual Property Law Association.

On March 13, 2017, Braden was appointed chief judge of the United States Court of Federal Claims by President Donald Trump. She assumed senior status on July 13, 2018, and was replaced as Chief Judge by Margaret M. Sweeney. She retired from the court on April 1, 2019. In December 2019, President Trump announced his intent to appoint Braden to the J. William Fulbright Foreign Scholarship Board.

Legal offices
Preceded by Roger Andewelt	Judge of the United States Court of Federal Claims; 2003–2018	Succeeded by Molly Silfen
Preceded by Patricia E. Campbell-Smith	Chief Judge of the United States Court of Federal Claims; 2017–2018	Succeeded by Margaret M. Sweeney
