= Mastin G. White =

American judge (1901–1987)

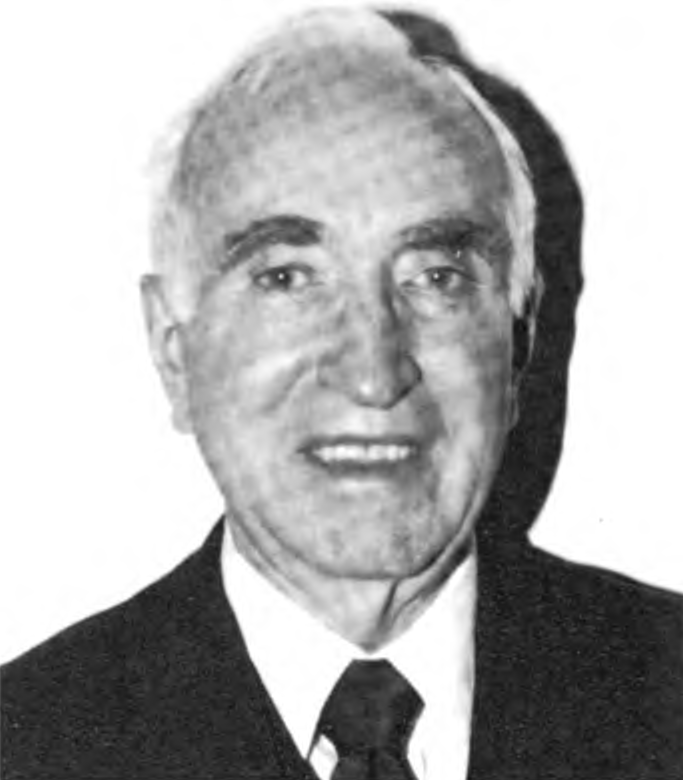

Senior Judge of the United States Court of Federal Claims
- In office October 1, 1982 – November 10, 1982
- Appointed by: operation of law
- In office November 19, 1982 – July 25, 1987

Judge of the United States Court of Federal Claims
- In office November 10, 1982 – November 19, 1982
- Appointed by: Ronald Reagan
- Preceded by: seat established
- Succeeded by: seat abolished

Personal details
- Born: January 1, 1901; Van Zandt County, Texas, U.S.
- Died: July 25, 1987 (aged 86); Washington, D.C., U.S.
- Education: University of Texas (LLB); Western New Mexico University (AB); Columbia University (LLM); Harvard University (SJD)

Mastin Gentry White (January 1, 1901 – July 25, 1987) was a judge of the United States Court of Federal Claims from 1982 to 1987.

== Early life and career ==
White was born in Van Zandt County, Texas. He received a Bachelor of Laws from the University of Texas School of Law in 1927, a Bachelor of Arts from New Mexico State Teachers College (now Western New Mexico University) in 1929, a Master of Laws from Columbia Law School in 1930, and a Doctor of Juridical Science from Harvard Law School in 1933. He was an assistant county attorney for Smith County, Texas, from 1927 to 1930. He entered academia as an associate professor at the University of Texas School of Law, from 1930 to 1932, and then as a Brandeis research fellow at Harvard Law School from 1932 to 1933.

White then went into government service, first as a special assistant to the Attorney General of the United States in the U.S. Department of Justice, from 1933 to 1935, and then as a solicitor in the U.S. Department of Agriculture, from 1935 to 1942. During World War II, he served as a colonel in the United States Army, from 1942 to 1946. After the war, he was a Solicitor for the U.S. Department of the Interior from 1946 to 1953, and chaired Department of Interior Loyalty Board hearings against federal employees alleged to be disloyal to the US Government. He was briefly in private practice in Washington, D.C., from 1953 to 1955.

In 1955, White became a trial judge of the United States Court of Claims. He was in active service as a judge of that court until 1971, when he became a senior trial judge. On October 1, 1982, White was appointed by operation of law as senior judge holding a new seat on the United States Court of Federal Claims, authorized by 96 Stat. 27. However, because the statute made no specific provision for such an appointment, on November 10, 1982, he received a recess appointment from President Ronald Reagan as a judge in regular active service in the same seat. He served in this capacity for nine days before once again assuming senior status on November 19, 1982, serving in this capacity until his death, in Washington, D.C. White was one of several judges originally assigned to the U.S. Court of Federal Claims for whom no successor was appointed.
