= Lynn J. Bush =

American judge (born 1948)

Lynn Bush
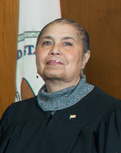
- Bush in 2017

Senior Judge of the United States Court of Federal Claims
- Incumbent
- Assumed office October 22, 2013

Judge of the United States Court of Federal Claims
- In office October 22, 1998 – October 22, 2013
- Appointed by: Bill Clinton
- Preceded by: Wilkes C. Robinson
- Succeeded by: David A. Tapp

Personal details
- Born: Lynn Jeanne Bush; December 30, 1948 (age 77) Little Rock, Arkansas, U.S.
- Education: Antioch University (BA); Georgetown University (JD)

Lynn Jeanne Bush (born December 30, 1948) is a senior judge of the United States Court of Federal Claims, appointed to that court in 1998 by President Bill Clinton.

== Early life, education, and career ==
Born in Little Rock, Arkansas, to John E. Bush III and Alice (Saville) Bush, Bush received a Bachelor of Arts from Antioch College in 1970, after which she received a Thomas J. Watson Fellowship, followed by a Juris Doctor from the Georgetown University Law Center in 1976.

Admitted to the Arkansas Bar in 1976 and to the District of Columbia Bar in 1977, she was a trial attorney for the Commercial Litigation Branch, Civil Division, of the U.S. Department of Justice from 1976 to 1987. She then moved to the Department of the Navy, where she was senior trial attorney for Naval Facilities Engineering Command until 1989, and counsel for Engineering Field Activity Chesapeake until 1996. She then became an administrative judge for the U.S. Department of Housing and Urban Development Board of Contract Appeals from 1996 until 1998.

=== Claims court service ===
On June 22, 1998, Bush was nominated by President Bill Clinton to be a judge of the United States Court of Federal Claims. She was confirmed by the U.S. Senate on October 21, 1998, and received her commission the next day. She assumed senior status on October 22, 2013.

== Personal life ==
Bush has one son, Brian Bush Ferguson.

Legal offices
Preceded by Wilkes C. Robinson	Judge of the United States Court of Federal Claims; 1998–2013	Succeeded by David A. Tapp
