= Roald A. Hogenson =

American judge (1913–1987)

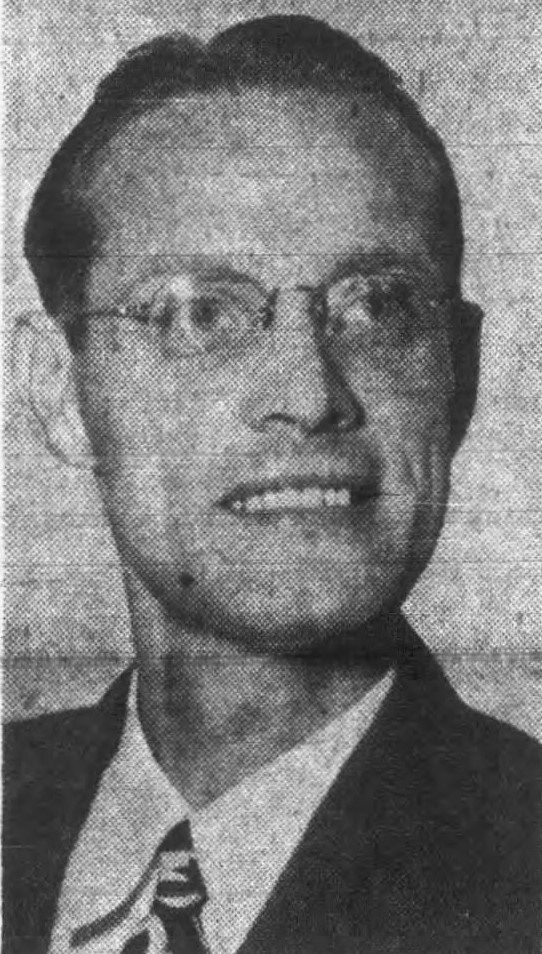
- Hogenson in 1945

Senior Judge of the United States Court of Federal Claims
- In office January 3, 1983 – July 16, 1987

Judge of the United States Court of Federal Claims
- In office October 1, 1982 – January 3, 1983
- Appointed by: operation of law
- Preceded by: seat established
- Succeeded by: seat abolished

Personal details
- Born: June 28, 1913 Salt Lake City, Utah, U.S.
- Died: July 16, 1987 (aged 74) Washington, D.C., U.S.
- Education: University of Utah, (BA); George Washington University (JD)

Roald Alma Hogenson (June 28, 1913 – July 16, 1987) was a judge of the United States Court of Federal Claims from 1982 to 1983.

Born in Salt Lake City, Utah, Hogenson received a Bachelor of Arts from the University of Utah in 1934 and was a secretary to United States Representative James W. Robinson of Utah from 1941 to 1944. During that period, Hogenson received a Juris Doctor from the George Washington University Law School in 1943.

He was a deputy county attorney for Salt Lake County from 1944 to 1946, becoming a judge of the Utah District Court, Third District from 1946 to 1950. From 1950 to 1982, Hogenson was a trial judge of the United States Court of Claims, serving as chief of the Trial Division from 1974 to 1980. On October 1, 1982, Hogenson was appointed by operation of law to a new seat on the United States Court of Federal Claims authorized by 96 Stat. 27. He assumed senior status on January 3, 1983, and served in that capacity until his death, in Washington, D.C. Hogenson was one of several judges originally assigned to the U.S. Court of Federal Claims for whom no successor was appointed.
