= Lloyd Fletcher =

American judge (1915–1991)

Senior Judge of the United States Court of Federal Claims
- In office October 8, 1982 – November 5, 1991

Judge of the United States Court of Federal Claims
- In office October 1, 1982 – October 8, 1982
- Appointed by: Operation of law

Personal details
- Born: January 5, 1915 Amarillo, Texas, U.S.
- Died: November 5, 1991 (aged 76) Scranton, Pennsylvania, U.S.

Lloyd Fletcher (January 5, 1915 – November 5, 1991) was a judge of the United States Court of Federal Claims from 1982 to 1991.

Born in Amarillo, Texas, Fletcher received a B.B.A. from the University of Texas in 1936, and a J.D. from the George Washington University Law School in 1939. He served in the U.S. Coast Guard Reserve during World War II, leaving with the rank of lieutenant junior grade. He was in private practice in Washington, D.C. from 1940 to 1957, and from 1959 to 1960, also serving as a professorial lecturer in business law at American University from 1946 to 1960.

He became a trial judge of the U.S. Court of Claims in 1960, and on October 1, 1982, he was reassigned by operation of law to a seat on the newly created U.S. Claims Court (later the United States Court of Federal Claims) authorized by 96 Stat. 27. He assumed senior status one week later, on October 8, 1982, and served in that capacity until his death, in Scranton, Pennsylvania. Fletcher was one of several judges originally assigned to the U.S. Court of Federal Claims for whom no successor was appointed.
