= Charles F. Lettow =

American judge (1941–2024)

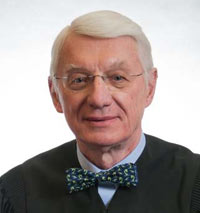

Senior Judge of the United States Court of Federal Claims
- In office July 13, 2018 – December 24, 2024

Judge of the United States Court of Federal Claims
- In office July 14, 2003 – July 13, 2018
- Appointed by: George W. Bush
- Preceded by: John Paul Wiese
- Succeeded by: Kathryn C. Davis

Personal details
- Born: February 10, 1941 Iowa Falls, Iowa, U.S.
- Died: December 24, 2024 (aged 83) Iowa Falls, Iowa, U.S.
- Education: Iowa State University (BS); Stanford University (LLB); Brown University (MA)

Charles Frederick Lettow (February 10, 1941 – December 24, 2024) was an American lawyer who served as a judge of the United States Court of Federal Claims. He was appointed in 2003 by President George W. Bush.

== Early life and career ==
Born to Carl F. and Catherine Lettow in Iowa Falls, Iowa, Lettow received a Bachelor of Science in chemical engineering from Iowa State University in 1962. He served in the U.S. Army with the Third Infantry Division from 1963 to 1965, and thereafter received a Bachelor of Laws degree from Stanford University in 1968, where he was Note Editor of the Stanford Law Review and a member of Order of the Coif. He was a law clerk to Judge Ben C. Duniway of the United States Court of Appeals for the Ninth Circuit, from 1968 to 1969, and to Chief Justice Warren E. Burger of the Supreme Court of the United States from 1969 to 1970. Lettow served as counsel to the Council on the Environmental Quality in the Executive Office of the President from 1970 to 1973. He then joined the law firm of Cleary, Gottlieb, Steen & Hamilton, first as an associate from 1973 to 1976, and then as a partner until 2003. During that time, he argued three cases in the U.S. Supreme Court and more than 40 cases in the federal courts of appeals, and handled numerous cases in federal trial courts.

While at Cleary, Gottlieb, Lettow was active with educational institutions and bar organizations. He served as a member of the board of trustees of The Potomac School from 1983 to 1990, and was chairman of the board from 1985 to 1988. He also was chairman of the Environmental Controls Committee of the Section of Business Law, American Bar Association, from 1983 to 1987. In January 1992, Lettow received an award from the National Association of Attorneys General "for sustained assistance to the States in their preparation for appearances before the Supreme Court of the United States". He became a member of the American Law Institute in 1994, and in 1997 and 1998, he received awards from the National State and Local Legal Center for amicus briefs in the U.S. Supreme Court. Lettow also received a Master of Arts in history from Brown University in 2001.

=== Claims court service ===
On July 14, 2003, Lettow was appointed a judge of the United States Court of Federal Claims. He was confirmed by the United States Senate and entered on duty on July 22, 2003. He assumed senior status on July 13, 2018.

== Personal life and death ==
Lettow maintained an interest in academic research on historical topics, particularly in the Tudor-Stuart period in England and the corresponding colonial period in the United States. He sustained an interest in agriculture and farming, maintaining a farm in south Pennsylvania. He married Bonnie Sue Tordoff (who died in 2016) in 1963 and resided in the Washington, D.C. metropolitan areas. He and his wife had four children.

He died in Iowa Falls on December 24, 2024 and was buried at Union Cemetery.

== See also ==
- List of law clerks for the chief justice of the United States

Legal offices
Preceded by John Paul Wiese	Judge of the United States Court of Federal Claims; 2003–2018	Succeeded by Kathryn C. Davis
