= John Light Napier =

American politician and judge

John Napier
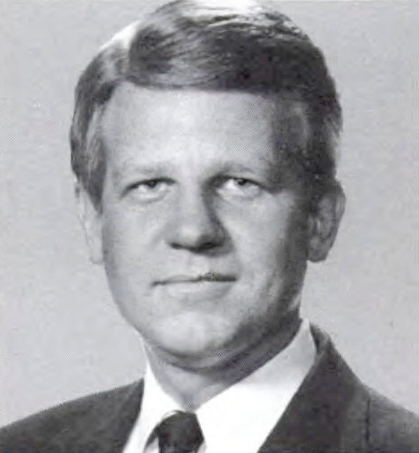

Judge of the United States Court of Federal Claims
- In office October 14, 1986 – July 31, 1989
- Appointed by: Ronald Reagan
- Preceded by: Kenneth R. Harkins
- Succeeded by: Robert H. Hodges Jr.

Member of the U.S. House of Representatives from South Carolina's 6th district
- In office January 3, 1981 – January 3, 1983
- Preceded by: John Jenrette
- Succeeded by: Robin Tallon

Personal details
- Born: John Light Napier; May 16, 1947 (age 79) Blenheim, South Carolina, U.S.
- Party: Republican
- Spouse: Pamela Caughman
- Education: Davidson College (BA); University of South Carolina (JD)

Military service
- Allegiance: United States
- Branch/service: United States Army Reserve
- Years of service: 1969–1977
- Rank: First Lieutenant

John Light Napier (born May 16, 1947) is an American lawyer, jurist, and politician who served one term in the United States House of Representatives from 1981 to 1983. He later served as a judge of the United States Court of Federal Claims from 1986 to 1989.

== Education ==
John Light Napier attended public schools in Marlboro County, South Carolina, before college. He graduated from Davidson College in 1969 and earned a Juris Doctor from the South Carolina Law School in 1972, while serving as a first lieutenant in the United States Army Reserve (which he served in until 1977).

== Early career ==
Napier was admitted to the bar in 1972, and also began to serve as legislative assistant to United States Senator Strom Thurmond, while serving as minority counsel on both the Subcommittee on Administrative Practices and Procedures and the Committee on Veterans Affairs.

In 1976, he was made Senator Thurmond's chief legal assistant and legal counsel. In 1977, he was named Chief Republican Counsel to the Senate Special Committee on Official Conduct which was charged with writing the initial Code of Ethics and Financial Disclosure for the US Senate. In 1978, Napier returned to the private practice of law in Bennettsville, South Carolina, which he maintained until 1980.

=== U.S. House of Representatives ===
In 1980, Napier was elected to the 97th United States Congress as a Representative from South Carolina's 6th congressional district. He served in this capacity until 1983, having lost his bid for reelection in 1982 to Democrat Robin Tallon. He was named a Deputy Whip and served on the Agriculture and Veterans Affairs Committees. Working in tandem with his Congressional neighbor, Congressman Charlie Rose (Democrat, North Carolina), he was widely credited with coalition building and crafting the bipartisan legislation for the tobacco stabilization program vital to the agricultural community of the southeast.

=== Claims court service ===
Napier was nominated by President Reagan to the United States Court of Federal Claims in 1986. He was unanimously confirmed by the Senate. At the request of the Chief Judge and his colleagues, he chaired a special committee of the judges which led to a restructuring the clerk's office and the financial office at the Court. He resigned from the court in 1989 and returned to private practice.

== Later career ==
In 1992 he served as special outside counsel in the House Committee on House Administration’s investigation of the Congressional Post Office scandal.

In private practice, he served as special outside counsel to the House of Representatives' committee investigating the US House Post Office scandal. His later career has involved a national law and governmental relations practice in Washington and the Carolinas which has included representation of national associations, state and local government entities, private industry, as well as individuals in a wide variety of governmental issues.

U.S. House of Representatives
Preceded by John Jenrette	Member of the U.S. House of Representatives from South Carolina's 6th congressional district 1981–1983	Succeeded by Robin Tallon
U.S. order of precedence (ceremonial)
Preceded by Frank Kratovil as Former U.S. Representative	Order of precedence of the United States as Former U.S. Representative	Succeeded by Joe Cunningham as Former U.S. Representative
