= Kenneth Harkins =

American judge (1921-2009)

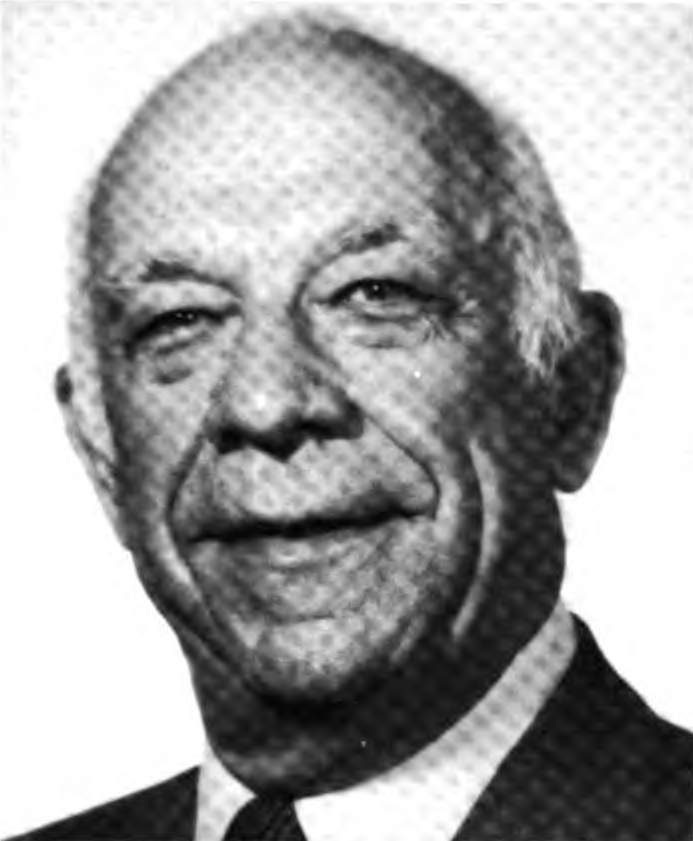

Senior Judge of the United States Court of Federal Claims
- In office November 30, 1986 – October 8, 2009

Judge of the United States Court of Federal Claims
- In office October 1, 1982 – November 30, 1986
- Appointed by: operation of law
- Preceded by: seat established
- Succeeded by: John Light Napier

Personal details
- Born: September 1, 1921 Cadiz, Ohio, U.S.
- Died: October 8, 2009 (aged 88) Bailey's Crossroads, Virginia, U.S.
- Education: Ohio State University (BA, LLB, JD)

Kenneth Richard Harkins (September 1, 1921 – October 8, 2009) was a judge of the United States Court of Federal Claims from 1982 to 1986.

== Early life, education, and military service ==
Born in Cadiz, Ohio, Harkins received a Bachelor of Arts from Ohio State University in 1943, and served in the United States Army during World War II, from 1943 to 1946. During the war, he served as a forward observer in the Army's 14th Armored Division, with which he participated in the Battle of the Bulge, receiving the Bronze Star Medal and Purple Heart. He achieved the rank of first lieutenant.

== Career ==
After the war, Harkins received a Bachelor of Laws from Ohio State University College of Law in 1948, and in 1949 became an attorney for the U.S. Housing and Home Finance Agency. From 1951 to 1955 he worked in the United States Department of Justice, as a trial attorney in the Antitrust Division. He was co-counsel to the Antitrust Subcommittee of the United States House of Representatives Committee on the Judiciary from 1955 to 1960, under Chairman Emanuel Celler (D-N.Y.), and then left government service to become general counsel to the Stromberg Carlson Division and Electronics Division of General Dynamics Corp., from 1960 to 1964. He returned to work for the House Antitrust Subcommittee as chief counsel, from 1964 to 1971. In 1967, he also received a J.D. from the Ohio State University College of Law.

=== Claims court service ===
Harkins served as a trial judge of the United States Court of Claims from 1971 until October 1, 1982 when he was appointed by statute to a new seat on the United States Claims Court (later United States Court of Federal Claims) authorized by 96 Stat. 27. He assumed senior status on November 30, 1986 and served in that capacity until his death, at the Goodwin House retirement home in Bailey's Crossroads, Virginia.

== Personal life ==
Harkins was married to Helen Dozer Harkins of Arlington for 66 years. They had two children, M. Elaine Harkins of Denver, Colorado and Richard A. Harkins of Vienna, Virginia. At the time of Harkins' death, he was also survived by three granddaughters.
