= United States Court of Federal Claims =

Court that hears monetary claims against the U.S. government

- (Fed. Cl.)
- Location: Howard T. Markey National Courts Building (Washington, D.C.)
- Appeals to: Federal Circuit
- Established: 1982 (predecessor court established in 1855)
- Authority: Article I tribunal
- Created by: Federal Courts Improvement Act; 28 U.S.C. §§ 1491–1509
- Composition method: Presidential nomination with Senate advice and consent
- Judges: 16
- Judge term length: 15 years
- Chief Judge: Matthew H. Solomson
- uscfc.uscourts.gov

The United States Court of Federal Claims (in case citations, Fed. Cl. or C.F.C.) is a United States federal court that hears monetary claims against the U.S. government. It was established by statute in 1982 as the United States Claims Court, and took its current name in 1992. The court is the successor to the trial division of the United States Court of Claims, which was established in 1855.

The courthouse of the Court of Federal Claims is situated in the Howard T. Markey National Courts Building (on Madison Place across from the White House) in Washington, D.C., but, for convenience, cases may be heard elsewhere in the country.

== History ==
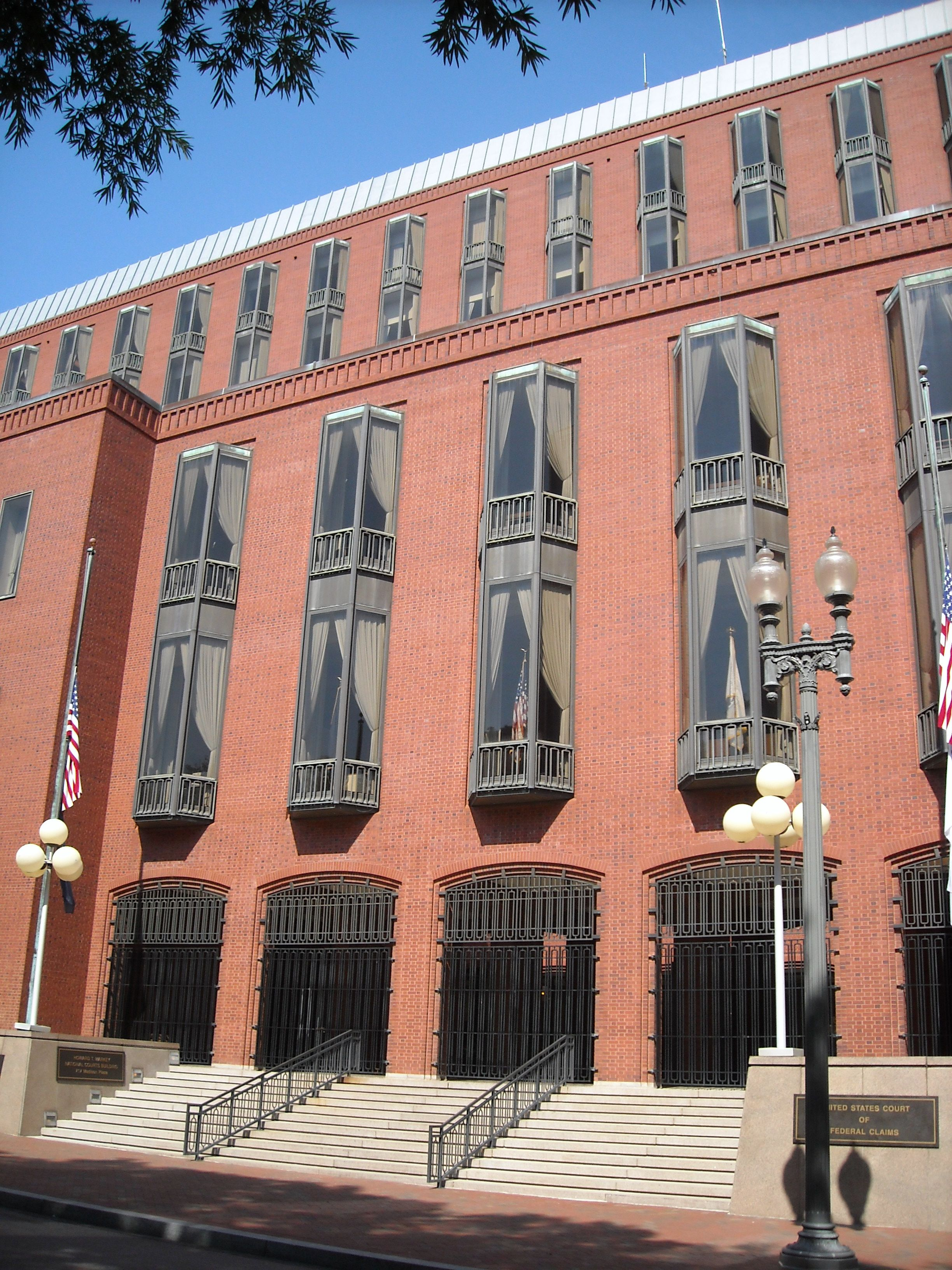
United States Court of Federal Claims on Madison Place in Washington, D.C.

=== Court of Claims (1855–1982) ===
The court traces its origins directly back to 1855, when Congress established the United States Court of Claims to provide for the determination of private claims against the United States government. The legislation was signed into law on February 24, 1855, by President Franklin Pierce. Throughout its 160-year history, although it has undergone notable changes in name, size, scope of jurisdiction, and procedures, its purpose has remained the same: in this court, the federal government stands as the defendant and may be sued by citizens seeking monetary redress. For this reason, the court has been referred to as the "keeper of the nation's conscience" and "the People's Court".

As originally established in 1855, the court lacked the essential judicial power to render final judgments. This oversight was resolved by legislation passed in 1866, in response to President Abraham Lincoln's insistence in his Annual Message to Congress in 1861 that "It is as much the duty of Government to render prompt justice against itself, in favor of citizens, as it is to administer the same, between private individuals."

In 1887, Congress passed the Tucker Act, which significantly expanded the court's jurisdiction to include all claims against the government except tort, equity, and admiralty claims. The court thus today has nationwide jurisdiction over most suits for monetary claims against the government and sits, without a jury, to determine issues of law and fact. The general jurisdiction of the court, described in 28 U.S.C. § 1491, is over claims for just compensation for the taking of private property, refund of federal taxes, military and civilian pay and allowances, and damages for breaches of contracts with the government. The court also possesses jurisdiction over claims for patent and copyright infringement against the United States, as well as over certain suits by Indian tribes.

Additionally, the court has jurisdiction to hear both pre-award and post-award bid protest suits by unsuccessful bidders on government contracts.

A unique aspect of the court's jurisdiction throughout its history has been the authority to act on congressional references of legislative proposals for compensation of individual claims. As eventually codified in 28 U.S.C. § 1492, either House of Congress may refer a bill to the Chief Judge of the court for an investigation and a report to Congress. A judge of the court is assigned to act as the hearing officer and preside over the judicial proceedings. Then a three-judge review panel submits a report to Congress for its consideration and disposition of such claims for compensation.

Befitting its unique role, the court has been located throughout its history in Washington, D.C., in the vicinity of the White House or in the U.S. Capitol Building. It first met in May 1855 at Willard's Hotel. In July of that year, it moved into the Capitol. After briefly using the Supreme Court's chamber in the basement of the Capitol, it then acquired its own rooms there. In 1879, the court obtained space on the ground floor of the Freedman's Bank Building, which stood at the place now occupied by the Treasury Annex, adjacent to the southeast corner of Lafayette Park. Two decades later, in 1899, the court moved to the building formerly occupied by William Corcoran's art collection across Lafayette Park at the intersection of 17th Street and Pennsylvania Avenue.

It remained there for 65 years. This building was designed by, and is presently named for, the architect James Renwick, who also designed the Smithsonian Institution's Castle on the National Mall and St. Patrick's Cathedral in New York City. When the facilities there were deemed inadequate by the mid-1950s, the court asked Congress for a new location. Eventually, the site at 717 Madison Place, NW, was chosen and the court moved to its present home on August 1, 1967.

The court's original composition of three judges was expanded to five in 1863. They would consider evidence proffered by claimants and weigh testimony taken by permanent or special commissioners employed by the court, who were dispersed across the United States. One of the first commissioners was Benjamin Harrison of Indiana, who would later become president. If oral argument was requested, the five judges would hear the case en banc. Appeal to the Supreme Court was by right if the amount in dispute was over $3,000. The growth in government caused by and coinciding with World War I made the system unworkable, as the number of filed cases increased considerably. In 1925, legislation enacted by Congress at the request of the court created a separate trial division of seven commissioners and elevated the five judges to an appellate role. Initially, the trial commissioners would function as special masters in chancery and conduct formal proceedings either at the court's home in Washington, D.C., or elsewhere in the United States in a court facility amenable to the parties. The trial procedures evolved to resemble a non-jury civil trial in district court.

In 1948, the commissioners were authorized to make recommendations for conclusions of law. The number of commissioners was increased in 1953 to 15. In 1966, Congress provided that there would be seven appellate judges to be appointed by the President with life tenure. In 1973, the title of the commissioners was changed to trial judge and by 1977, the Court of Claims had 16 trial judges who conducted trials of cases in the first instance. Judgments, which are required to be paid out of appropriations by Congress, were originally paid by individual appropriations passed separately or as part of other appropriations bills. In 1955, Congress provided for a standing appropriation for judgments of $100,000 or less. Finally, in 1977, Congress created a permanent, indefinite appropriation for all judgments awarded by the court.

=== Current institution (since 1982) ===
The Federal Courts Improvement Act of 1982 created the modern court. While the appellate division of the Court of Claims was combined with the United States Court of Customs and Patent Appeals to comprise the new United States Court of Appeals for the Federal Circuit, the trial division of the Court of Claims became the United States Claims Court (and in 1992, the name was changed to the United States Court of Federal Claims). Appeals from the Court of Federal Claims are taken to the United States Court of Appeals for the Federal Circuit and a judgment there is conclusive unless reviewed by the Supreme Court on writ of certiorari. Decisions of the Court of Claims are binding precedent on both its appellate and trial court successors.

The court, as now constituted, consists of 16 judges, appointed by the president and subject to confirmation by the U.S. Senate for terms of 15 years. In addition, judges who have completed their statutory terms of office are authorized to continue to take cases as senior judges of the court. This ongoing tenure serves as a mechanism to ensure judicial impartiality and independence.

In recent years, the court's docket has been increasingly characterized by complex, high-dollar demands, and high-profile cases in such areas as, for example, the savings and loan crisis of the 1980s, the World War II internment of Japanese-Americans, and the federal repository of civilian spent nuclear fuel.

Nevertheless, despite the nature of the claim, the notability of the claimant, or the amount in dispute, the Court of Federal Claims acts as a clearing house when the government must settle with those it has legally wronged. As observed by former Chief Judge Loren A. Smith, the court is the institutional scale that weighs the government's actions against the standard measure of the law and helps make concrete the spirit of the First Amendment's guarantee of the right "to petition the Government for redress of grievances".

The National Childhood Vaccine Injury Act of 1986 gave the court the authority to create an Office of Special Masters to receive and hear certain vaccine injury cases, and the jurisdiction to review those cases. This vaccine injury jurisdiction has been enlarged in recent years to encompass claims stemming from a number of additional vaccines, including, for example, varicella, hepatitis B, and influenza.

Though a provision of the Administrative Dispute Resolution Act of 1996 gave the Court of Federal Claims and U.S. district courts concurrent jurisdiction over post-award protests, subsequent legislation provided that, as of January 2001, the United States Court of Federal Claims would be the exclusive judicial forum for post-award bid protest litigation.

In 2006, the court rendered judgments in more than 900 cases and awarded $1.8 billion in damages.

== Jurisdiction ==
The court has special jurisdiction, spelled out in 28 U.S.C. § 1491: it hears claims for monetary damages that arise from the United States Constitution, federal statutes, executive regulations, or an express or implied in fact contract with the United States Government, most notably under the Tucker Act. The court is established pursuant to Congress's authority under Article One of the United States Constitution. The court has concurrent jurisdiction with U.S. district courts, when the claim is for less than $10,000, by the provisions of 28 U.S.C. § 1346. Claims have a statute of limitations of six years from the time the claim first accrues.

The court has concurrent jurisdiction involving contracts with the federal government, where a contractor has the option of choosing between filing suit with the court or with the agency Board of Contract Appeals. The general rule is that a contractor may either 1) file suit within 90 days with the agency Board of Contract Appeals or 2) file suit within one year with the court. A contractor, however, must choose which forum in which to file; a contractor cannot file suit with both the agency Board and with the court. (However, in a case where a contractor has filed with the Board, and the Government challenges the timeliness of the filing – the 90-day limit is statutory and cannot be extended – the contractor can file with the court within the one-year period to protect its claims.)

Unlike district courts, which generally only have jurisdiction over disputes in their geographic district, the CFC has jurisdiction over disputes wherever they occur in the country. To accommodate litigants, judges on the court may hold trials at local courthouses near where the disputes arise.

All trials at the court are bench trials, without juries. Because the court only hears cases against the Government, the United States is always the defendant in cases before the CFC.

The court receives a variety of claims against the government, including breach of contract claims, illegal exaction claims, takings claims under the 5th Amendment, claims involving military pay, claims for patent and copyright infringement against the government, federal tax refund claims, and protests regarding contract bidding procedures. According to the Court, tax refund suits make up a quarter of the claims brought before it, although the court exercises concurrent jurisdiction with United States district courts in this area.

Orders and judgments from the court are appealed to the United States Court of Appeals for the Federal Circuit, which resides in the same building as the CFC.

This court does not have jurisdiction in claims arising under the Federal Tort Claims Act, which are heard in the appropriate venue United States district court, 28 USC § 1346(b)(1), nor judicial review of the decisions of the Board of Veterans' Appeals (Judicial review of those decisions is vested instead in the United States Court of Appeals for Veterans Claims, appeals from which are to the Federal Circuit). Certain procedural differences accrue due to the different jurisdiction, e.g., under the FTCA, the statute of limitations runs two years from the date of the tortious occurrence, or six months from the final denial of administrative relief. See: Exhaustion of remedies.

=== Congressional references ===
The court also may hear congressional reference cases, which are cases referred to the court by either house of Congress. The judge serving as hearing officer renders a report as to the case's merits, which is reviewed by a panel of judges formed for that purpose. The report is forwarded back to the chamber of Congress requesting it.

== Judges ==
Unlike judges of courts established under Article Three of the United States Constitution, judges on the Court of Federal Claims do not have life tenure (see Article I and Article III tribunals). Instead, they serve for 15-year terms and are eligible for reappointment. The President appoints the judges of the U.S. Court of Federal Claims with the Senate's advice and consent. The judges are removable by the U.S. Court of Appeals for the Federal Circuit for "incompetency, misconduct, neglect of duty, engaging in the practice of law, or physical or mental disability."

== Current composition of the court ==
As of April 10, 2025:

#	Title	Judge	Duty station	Born	Term of service			Appointed by
#	Title	Judge	Duty station	Born	Active	Chief	Senior	Appointed by
55	Chief Judge	Matthew H. Solomson	Washington, D.C.	1974	2020–present	2025–present	—	Trump
50	Judge	Elaine D. Kaplan	Washington, D.C.	1955	2013–present	2021–2025	—	Obama (Judge); Biden (Chief Judge)
52	Judge	Richard Hertling	Washington, D.C.	1960	2019–present	—	—	Trump
53	Judge	Ryan T. Holte	Washington, D.C.	1983	2019–present	—	—	Trump
54	Judge	David A. Tapp	Washington, D.C.	1962	2019–present	—	—	Trump
56	Judge	Eleni M. Roumel	Washington, D.C.	1974	2020–present	2020–2021	—	Trump
57	Judge	Edward H. Meyers	Washington, D.C.	1972	2020–present	—	—	Trump
58	Judge	Kathryn C. Davis	Washington, D.C.	1978	2020–present	—	—	Trump
59	Judge	Zachary Somers	Washington, D.C.	1979	2020–present	—	—	Trump
60	Judge	Thompson M. Dietz	Washington, D.C.	1979	2020–present	—	—	Trump
61	Judge	Stephen S. Schwartz	Washington, D.C.	1983	2020–present	—	—	Trump
62	Judge	Carolyn N. Lerner	Washington, D.C.	1965	2022–present	—	—	Biden
63	Judge	Armando O. Bonilla	Washington, D.C.	1967	2022–present	—	—	Biden
64	Judge	Molly Silfen	Washington, D.C.	1980	2023–present	—	—	Biden
65	Judge	Philip Hadji	Washington, D.C.	1981	2023–present	—	—	Biden
66	Judge	Robin M. Meriweather	Washington, D.C.	1974	2024–present	—	—	Biden
11	Senior Judge	John Paul Wiese	inactive	1934	1982–2001	—	2001–present	Reagan
15	Senior Judge	Robert J. Yock	inactive	1938	1983–1998	—	1998–present	Reagan
22	Senior Judge	Moody R. Tidwell III	inactive	1939	1983–1998	—	1998–present	Reagan
23	Senior Judge	Loren A. Smith	Washington, D.C.	1944	1985–2000	1986–2000	2000–present	Reagan
24	Senior Judge	Marian Blank Horn	Washington, D.C.	1943	1986–2001; 2003–2018	—	2001–2003; 2018–present	Reagan; G.W. Bush (reappointment)
25	Senior Judge	Eric G. Bruggink	Washington, D.C.	1949	1986–2001	—	2001–present	Reagan
28	Senior Judge	Bohdan A. Futey	inactive	1939	1987–2002	—	2002–present	Reagan
30	Senior Judge	James T. Turner	inactive	1938	1987–2002	—	2002–present	Reagan
32	Senior Judge	Robert H. Hodges Jr.	inactive	1944	1990–2005	—	2005–present	G.H.W. Bush
34	Senior Judge	Lawrence Baskir	inactive	1938	1998–2013	2000–2002	2013–present	Clinton
36	Senior Judge	Lynn J. Bush	inactive	1948	1998–2013	—	2013–present	Clinton
37	Senior Judge	Edward J. Damich	Washington, D.C.	1948	1998–2013	2002–2009	2013–present	Clinton (Judge); G.W. Bush (Chief Judge)
45	Senior Judge	Victor J. Wolski	Washington, D.C.	1962	2003–2018	—	2018–present	G.W. Bush
48	Senior Judge	Margaret M. Sweeney	inactive	1955	2005–2020	2018–2020	2020–present	G.W. Bush (Judge); Trump (Chief Judge)

== Former judges ==
#	Judge	State	Born–died	Active service	Chief Judge	Senior status	Appointed by	Reason for termination
1	Joseph V. Colaianni	MI	1933–2018	1982–1984 (Note: Reassigned from the Court of Claims.)	–	–	Operation of law	resignation
2	Lloyd Fletcher	DC	1915–1991	1982	–	1982–1991	Operation of law	death
3	Kenneth Harkins	OH	1921–2009	1982–1986	–	1986–2009	Operation of law	death
4	Roald A. Hogenson	UT	1913–1987	1982–1983	–	1983–1987	Operation of law	death
5	Thomas J. Lydon	ME	1927–2012	1982–1987	–	1987–2012	Operation of law	death
6	James F. Merow	VA	1932–2016	1982–1998	–	1998–2016	Operation of law; Reagan (reappointment)	death
7	Philip R. Miller	NY	1918–1989	1982–1986	–	1986–1989	Operation of law	death
8	David Schwartz	NY	1916–1989	1982	–	1982–1989	Operation of law	death
9	Robert M. M. Seto	HI	1936–present	1982–1987	–	–	Operation of law	resignation
10	Louis Spector	NY	1918–2003	1982–1983	–	1983–1985	Operation of law	retirement
12	George Willi	DC	1924–2016	1982	–	1982–1985	Operation of law	retirement
13	Harry E. Wood	DC	1926–2009	1982–1986	–	1986	Operation of law	retirement
14	Judith Ann Yannello	NY	1943–2019	1982–1987	–	–	Operation of law	resignation
16	Alex Kozinski	DC	1950–present	1982–1985	1982–1985	–	Reagan	resignation
17	Mastin G. White	TX	1901–1987	1982 (Note: Judge White was reappointed from senior service to active service in 1982 by Reagan via a recess appointment; however he assumed senior status on November 19, 1982, prior to being formally nominated.)	–	1982–1987	Operation of law; Reagan (reappointment)	death
18	Reginald W. Gibson	IL	1927–2018	1982–1995	—	1995–2018	Reagan	death
19	Lawrence S. Margolis	MD	1935–2017	1982–1997	–	1997–2017	Reagan	death
20	Haldane Robert Mayer	VA	1941–present	1982–1987	–	–	Reagan	elevation to Fed. Cir.
21	Christine Odell Cook Miller (Note: Served as Christine Cook Nettesheim from December 10, 1982, until September 10, 1994.)	DC	1944–present	1982–2013 (Note: Second appointment was a recess appointment; formally nominated on January 29, 1998, confirmed by the Senate on February 3, 1998, and received commission on February 4, 1998.)	–	2013	Reagan; Clinton (reappointment)	retirement
26	John Light Napier	SC	1947–present	1986–1989	–	–	Reagan	resignation
27	Wilkes C. Robinson	KS	1925–2015	1987–1997	–	1997–2015	Reagan	death
29	Roger Andewelt	DC	1946–2001	1987–2001	–	–	Reagan	death
31	Randall Ray Rader	VA	1949–present	1988–1990	–	–	Reagan	elevation to Fed. Cir.
33	Diane Gilbert Sypolt	DC	1947–present	1990–2005	–	2005	G.H.W. Bush	retirement
35	Emily C. Hewitt	MA	1944–present	1998–2013	2009–2013	–	Clinton (Judge); Obama (Chief Judge)	retirement
39	Francis Allegra	VA	1957–2015	1998–2013	–	2013–2015	Clinton	death
38	Nancy B. Firestone	DC	1951–2022	1998–2013	—	2013–2022	Clinton	death
40	Sarah L. Wilson	MD	1959–present	2001–2002 (Note: Recess appointment; the Senate later rejected the appointment.)	–	–	Clinton	not confirmed
41	Lawrence J. Block	VA	1951–2025	2002–2016	–	–	G.W. Bush	retirement
42	Charles F. Lettow	IA	1941–2024	2003–2018	-	2018–2024	G.W. Bush	death
43	Susan G. Braden	DC	1948–present	2003–2018	2017–2018	2018–2019	G.W. Bush (Judge); Trump (Chief Judge)	retirement
44	Mary Ellen Coster Williams	MD	1953–present	2003–2018	—	2018–2023	G.W. Bush	retirement
46	George W. Miller	VA	1941–2016	2003–2013	–	–	G.W. Bush	retirement
47	Thomas C. Wheeler	MD	1948–present	2005–2020	—	—	G.W. Bush	retirement
49	Patricia E. Campbell-Smith	DC	1966–present	2013–2023	2013–2017	–	Obama	retirement
51	Lydia Griggsby	MD	1968–present	2014–2021	–	–	Obama	elevation to D. Md

== Chief judges ==
Chief Judge
Kozinski	1982–1985
Smith	1986–2000
Baskir	2000–2002
Damich	2002–2009
Hewitt	2009–2013
Campbell-Smith	2013–2017
Braden	2017–2018
Sweeney	2018–2020
Roumel	2020–2021
Kaplan	2021–2025
Solomson	2025–present

== Succession of seats ==
Seat 1
Reassigned as Judge of the United States Claims Court on October 1, 1982, from Trial Judge of the United States Court of Claims by 96 Stat. 27
Colaianni	MI	1982–1984
Smith	VA	1985–1993
Redesignated January 1, 1993, as Judge of the United States Court of Federal Claims by 106 Stat. 4506
Smith	VA	1993–2000
Wilson	MD	2001–2002
Williams	MD	2003–2018
Roumel	MD	2020–present

Seat 2
Reassigned as Judge of the United States Claims Court on October 1, 1982, from Trial Judge of the United States Court of Claims by 96 Stat. 27
Fletcher	DC	1982
Seat abolished October 8, 1982, upon incumbent taking senior status

Seat 3
Reassigned as Judge of the United States Claims Court on October 1, 1982, from Trial Judge of the United States Court of Claims by 96 Stat. 27
Harkins	OH	1982–1986
Napier	SC	1986–1989
Hodges, Jr.	SC	1990–1993
Redesignated January 1, 1993, as Judge of the United States Court of Federal Claims by 106 Stat. 4506
Hodges, Jr.	SC	1993–2005
Sweeney	VA	2005–2020
Lerner	MD	2022–present

Seat 4
Reassigned as Judge of the United States Claims Court on October 1, 1982, from Trial Judge of the United States Court of Claims by 96 Stat. 27
Hogenson	UT	1982–1983
Seat abolished January 3, 1983, upon incumbent taking senior status

Seat 5
Reassigned as Judge of the United States Claims Court on October 1, 1982, from Trial Judge of the United States Court of Claims by 96 Stat. 27
Lydon	ME	1982–1987
Andewelt	DC	1987–1993
Redesignated January 1, 1993, as Judge of the United States Court of Federal Claims by 106 Stat. 4506
Andewelt	DC	1993–2001
Braden	DC	2003–2018
Silfen	DC	2023–present

Seat 6
Reassigned as Judge of the United States Claims Court on October 1, 1982, from Trial Judge of the United States Court of Claims by 96 Stat. 27
Merow	VA	1982–1993
Redesignated January 1, 1993, as Judge of the United States Court of Federal Claims by 106 Stat. 4506
Merow	VA	1993–1998
Damich	VA	1998–2013
Bonilla	DC	2022–present

Seat 7
Reassigned as Judge of the United States Claims Court on October 1, 1982, from Trial Judge of the United States Court of Claims by 96 Stat. 27
P. Miller	NY	1982–1986
Futey	OH	1987–1993
Redesignated January 1, 1993, as Judge of the United States Court of Federal Claims by 106 Stat. 4506
Futey	OH	1993–2002
Wolski	VA	2003–2018
Dietz	NJ	2020–present

Seat 8
Reassigned as Judge of the United States Claims Court on October 1, 1982, from Trial Judge of the United States Court of Claims by 96 Stat. 27
D. Schwartz	NY	1982
C. Miller	DC	1982–1993
Redesignated January 1, 1993, as Judge of the United States Court of Federal Claims by 106 Stat. 4506
C. Miller	DC	1993–2013
Kaplan	DC	2013–present

Seat 9
Reassigned as Judge of the United States Claims Court on October 1, 1982, from Trial Judge of the United States Court of Claims by 96 Stat. 27
Seto	HI	1982–1987
Rader	VA	1988–1990
Sypolt	DC	1990–1993
Redesignated January 1, 1993, as Judge of the United States Court of Federal Claims by 106 Stat. 4506
Sypolt	DC	1993–2005
Wheeler	MD	2005–2020
Somers	DC	2020–present

Seat 10
Reassigned as Judge of the United States Claims Court on October 1, 1982, from Trial Judge of the United States Court of Claims by 96 Stat. 27
Spector	NY	1982–1983
Tidwell III	VA	1983–1993
Redesignated January 1, 1993, as Judge of the United States Court of Federal Claims by 106 Stat. 4506
Tidwell III	VA	1993–1998
Firestone	VA	1998–2013
Holte	OH	2019–present

Seat 11
Reassigned as Judge of the United States Claims Court on October 1, 1982, from Trial Judge of the United States Court of Claims by 96 Stat. 27
Wiese	VA	1982–1993
Redesignated January 1, 1993, as Judge of the United States Court of Federal Claims by 106 Stat. 4506
Wiese	VA	1993–2001
Lettow	VA	2003–2018
Davis	MD	2020–present

Seat 12
Reassigned as Judge of the United States Claims Court on October 1, 1982, from Trial Judge of the United States Court of Claims by 96 Stat. 27
Willi	DC	1982
Seat abolished December 14, 1982, upon incumbent taking senior status

Seat 13
Reassigned as Judge of the United States Claims Court on October 1, 1982, from Trial Judge of the United States Court of Claims by 96 Stat. 27
Wood	DC	1982–1986
Bruggink	VA	1986–1993
Redesignated January 1, 1993, as Judge of the United States Court of Federal Claims by 106 Stat. 4506
Bruggink	VA	1993–2001
Block	VA	2002–2016
Meyers	MD	2020–present

Seat 14
Reassigned as Judge of the United States Claims Court on October 1, 1982, from Trial Judge of the United States Court of Claims by 96 Stat. 27
Yannello	NY	1982–1987
Robinson	KS	1987–1993
Redesignated January 1, 1993, as Judge of the United States Court of Federal Claims by 106 Stat. 4506
Robinson	KS	1993–1997
Bush	DC	1998–2013
Tapp	KY	2019–present

Seat 15
Reassigned as Judge of the United States Claims Court on October 1, 1982, from Trial Judge of the United States Court of Claims by 96 Stat. 27
Yock	VA	1982–1993
Redesignated January 1, 1993, as Judge of the United States Court of Federal Claims by 106 Stat. 4506
Yock	VA	1993–1998
Hewitt	MA	1998–2013
Solomson	MD	2020–present

Seat 16
Established as Judge of the United States Claims Court on October 1, 1982, by 96 Stat. 27
Kozinski	DC	1982–1985
Horn	MD	1986–1993
Redesignated January 1, 1993, as Judge of the United States Court of Federal Claims by 106 Stat. 4506
Horn	MD	1993–2001; 2003–2018
S. Schwartz	VA	2020–present

Seat 17
Established as Judge of the United States Claims Court on October 1, 1982, by 96 Stat. 27
White	TX	1982
Seat abolished November 19, 1982, upon incumbent taking senior status

Seat 18
Established as Judge of the United States Claims Court on October 1, 1982, by 96 Stat. 27
Gibson	IL	1982–1993
Redesignated January 1, 1993, as Judge of the United States Court of Federal Claims by 106 Stat. 4506
Gibson	IL	1993–1995
Baskir	MD	1998–2013
Campbell-Smith	DC	2013–2023
Meriweather	VA	2024–present

Seat 19
Established as Judge of the United States Claims Court on October 1, 1982, by 96 Stat. 27
Margolis	MD	1982–1993
Redesignated January 1, 1993, as Judge of the United States Court of Federal Claims by 106 Stat. 4506
Margolis	MD	1993–1997
Allegra	VA	1998–2013
Griggsby	MD	2014–2021
Hadji	DC	2023–present

Seat 20
Established as Judge of the United States Claims Court on October 1, 1982, by 96 Stat. 27
Mayer	VA	1982–1987
Turner	VA	1987–1993
Redesignated January 1, 1993, as Judge of the United States Court of Federal Claims by 106 Stat. 4506
Turner	VA	1993–2002
G. Miller	VA	2003–2013
Hertling	MD	2019–present

== See also ==
- Rules and Forms
- Federal Tort Claims Act
- Tucker Act
- United States Court of Appeals for the Federal Circuit
- New York Court of Claims

== Bibliography ==
- The United States Court of Federal Claims handbook and procedures manual by David B. Stinson. 2nd ed. Washington, D.C.: Bar Association of the District of Columbia, 2003.
- The United States Court of Federal Claims : a deskbook for practitioners by United States Court of Federal Claims Bar Association. 4th ed. Washington, D.C.: The Bar Association, 1998.
