= Robin Tallon =

American politician (born 1946)

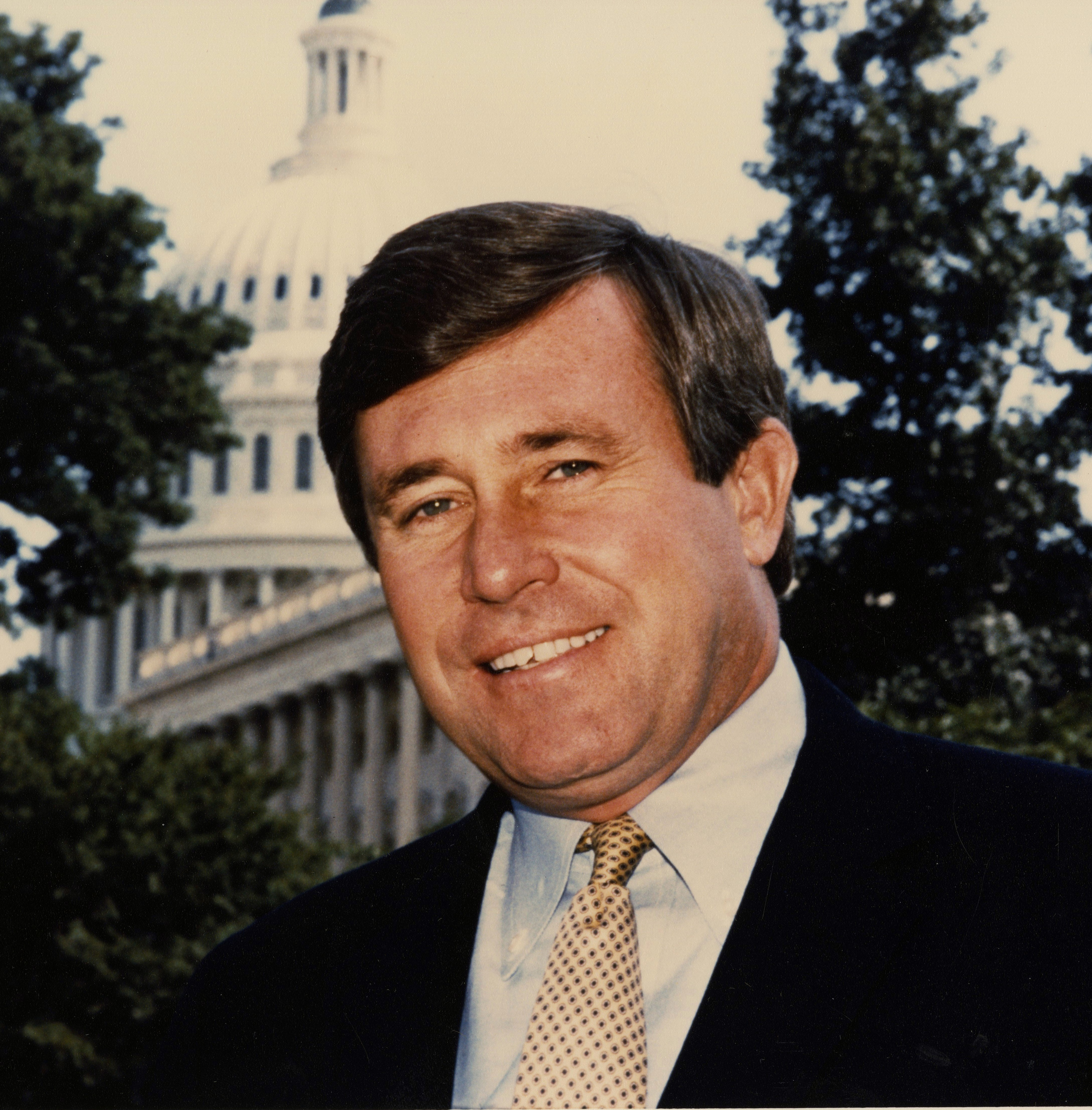

Member of the U.S. House of Representatives from South Carolina's 6th district
- In office January 3, 1983 – January 3, 1993
- Preceded by: John Light Napier
- Succeeded by: Jim Clyburn

Member of the South Carolina House of Representatives from the 62nd district
- In office December 2, 1980 – December 7, 1982
- Preceded by: Hicks Harwell
- Succeeded by: Frank Gilbert

Personal details
- Born: Robert Mooneyhan Tallon Jr. August 8, 1946 (age 79) Hemingway, South Carolina, U.S.
- Party: Democratic (before 2025); Independent (2025–present)
- Education: University of South Carolina; American University (BA)

Robert Mooneyhan "Robin" Tallon Jr. (born August 8, 1946) is an American businessman and politician who served five terms as a United States representative from South Carolina from 1983 to 1993. He was a member of the Democratic Party before leaving in 2025.

== Early life and education ==
Born in Hemingway, South Carolina, Tallon graduated from Dillon High School in 1964 and then attended University of South Carolina in 1964-1965. He received his Bachelor of Arts from American University in 1994.

== Career ==
Tallon was the owner of a chain of retail clothing stores in the Carolinas and Georgia and real estate broker and developer before entering politics. He was a delegate of the White House Conference on Small Business in 1980.

=== Congress ===
Tallon was a member of the South Carolina House of Representatives from 1980 to 1982. He was elected as a Democrat to the 98th United States Congress and to the four succeeding Congresses, serving from January 3, 1983 to January 3, 1993. He was a member of the Agricultural Committee, the Merchant Marine & Fisheries Committee and was Chairman of the Tourism Caucus.

After South Carolina's 6th congressional district was redrawn by the legislature following the 1990 census and became a majority-minority district, Tallon opted not to run in 1992 for renomination as a candidate to the 103rd United States Congress.

== Later career ==
Tallon is a principal in the government affairs and public relations firm, Jenkins Hill Consulting, in Washington, D.C., and serves on the board of trustees of the Medical University of South Carolina. Tallon is a member of the ReFormers Caucus of Issue One.

In April 2025, during an interview with the South Carolina Daily Gazette, Tallon said he no longer considered himself a Democrat, saying that he felt that the party had moved too far left. He also expressed interest in running for the U.S. Senate in South Carolina against Republican incumbent Lindsey Graham as an independent.

== Personal life ==
Tallon is a resident of Florence, South Carolina, and Washington, D.C. On October 25, 2002, police arrested Tallon for shoplifting from an Eckerd's drug store. The items stolen were less than $13. Eckerd soon dropped the charges.

U.S. House of Representatives
Preceded by John Light Napier	Member of the U.S. House of Representatives from South Carolina's 6th congressional district 1983–1993	Succeeded by Jim Clyburn
U.S. order of precedence (ceremonial)
Preceded by Roy Dyson as Former U.S. Representative	Order of precedence of the United States as Former U.S. Representative	Succeeded by Henry E. Brown Jr. as Former U.S. Representative
