= Loren A. Smith =

American judge (born 1944)

Loren Smith
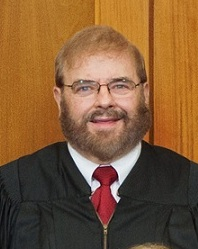
- Smith in 2017

Senior Judge of the United States Court of Federal Claims
- Incumbent
- Assumed office July 10, 2000

Chief Judge of the United States Court of Federal Claims
- In office January 14, 1986 – July 10, 2000
- Appointed by: Ronald Reagan
- Preceded by: Alex Kozinski
- Succeeded by: Lawrence Baskir

Judge of the United States Court of Federal Claims
- In office July 11, 1985 – July 10, 2000
- Appointed by: Ronald Reagan
- Preceded by: Joseph V. Colaianni
- Succeeded by: Sarah L. Wilson

Chair of the Administrative Conference of the United States
- In office 1981–1985
- President: Ronald Reagan
- Preceded by: Reuben Robertson
- Succeeded by: Marshall Breger

Personal details
- Born: December 22, 1944 (age 80); Chicago, Illinois, U.S.
- Spouse: Catherine Yore (m. 1944–2024)
- Children: 2
- Education: Northwestern University (BA, JD)

Loren A. Smith (born December 22, 1944) is an American jurist and academic. Smith currently serves as a senior judge of the United States Court of Federal Claims. He served as the Chief Judge of the United States Court of Federal Claims from 1986 to 2000 and as Chair of the Administrative Conference of the United States from 1981 to 1985.

== Biography ==
Smith was born on December 22, 1944, in Chicago and earned his Bachelor of Arts and Juris Doctor from Northwestern University and Northwestern University School of Law, respectively.

Smith worked as a consultant for the Chicago law firm Sidley & Austin from 1972-73. He then worked as an attorney for the Federal Communications Commission (1973) before serving as Assistant to the Special Counsel to the President (1973–74) amid the Watergate Scandal. Smith later served as a Special Assistant U.S. Attorney for the District of Columbia (1974–75) and a professor of law at Delaware Law School (1976–84).

Smith joined the Reagan for President campaign as Chief Counsel (1976) and (1980) and served as director of the Executive Branch Management Office of Presidential Transition (1980–81).

President Reagan appointed Smith Chairman of the Administrative Conference of the United States (1981–85), during which time he was also a member of the president's Cabinet Councils on Legal Policy and on Management and Administration. He also served as the chairman of the Council of Independent Regulatory Agencies.

Smith is an adjunct professor of law at George Mason University School of Law; American University Washington College of Law; Georgetown University Law Center; and the Columbus School of Law at The Catholic University of America. He taught as an adjunct professor of law at The International School of Law (now Antonin Scalia University School of Law) during 1973–74.

=== Federal Judicial Service ===
Smith was appointed a judge of the United States Court of Federal Claims by President Ronald Reagan and confirmed by the Senate on July 1, 1985, and entered duty on September 12, 1985. He was designated Chief Judge on January 14, 1986, also by President Reagan. After serving 15 years as chief judge, Smith took senior status on July 10, 2000.

== Personal life and other activities ==
He was married to the former Catherine (Kitty) Yore (1944-2024) for 51 years; has two sons, Loren Jr. and Adam (1980–1997). Smith is an amateur magician. One of his signature tricks involves a magic coloring book.

Smith is a longtime member of the University Club of Washington D.C., where he is an honorary member. He served as chairman of the Club's Centennial Committee and hosts the annual William Howard Taft Supreme Court Review, named for the Club's founder and 10th Chief Justice of the United States.

Smith has served as an international elections observer in Chile and Serbia. He has spoken and appeared on TV and radio in Estonia, The Republic of South Africa, Zambia, Kenya, The Czech Republic, Hungary, Turkey, Egypt, Pakistan, the Philippines, Singapore, Italy, Germany, England, Canada, Spain, Switzerland, and Ukraine on behalf of the United States Information Agency and other groups. In 2007, Smith traveled to Thailand to advise the writers of the new Thai constitution.

== Awards ==
=== Honorary Degrees and Academic Appointments ===
- L.L.D., Capital University Law School, Columbus, Ohio,1996
- L.L.D., Campbell University, The Norman Adrian Wiggins School of Law, Buies Creek, NC, 1997
- L.L.D., John Marshall Law School, Atlanta, GA
- The George E. Allen Chair in Law, University of Richmond School of Law, Richmond, VA, 1997
- Distinguished Jurist-In-Residence, University of Denver College of Law

=== Memberships ===
- Honorary Member, the University Club of Washington D.C.
- Chairman, WETA Community Advisory Council

=== Bar Admissions ===
Smith is a member of the Bars of the Supreme Court of Illinois; U.S. Court of Appeals for the Armed Forces; United States Court of Appeals, D.C. Circuit; United States Supreme Court; United States Court of Appeals for the Federal Circuit; United States Court of Federal Claims. Smith is also an Honorary Member of the Bar Association of the District of Columbia.

=== Other Awards and Honors ===
- In 1993, Smith was presented with the Presidential Medal by The Catholic University of America.
- In 1997, Smith was presented with The Ronald Reagan Public Service Award at the annual National Property Rights Conference.
- In 1997, Smith was presented with the Judicial Honoree Award by the Bar Association of the District of Columbia.
- Medal of Justice, Ministry of Justice of Romania

== Publications ==
Smith is author of the following:

- The Morality of Regulation, William & Mary Environmental Law and Policy Review, 1998
- The Aging of Administrative Law: The Administrative Conference Reaches Early Retirement, Arizona State Law Journal, 1998
- Renovation of an Old Court, Federal Bar News and Journal, September 1993; A Spring Thaw in Estonia, The Washington Times, April 11, 1992
- Administration: An Idea Whose Time May Have Passed, in The Fettered Presidency, eds. L. Gordon Crovitz & Jeremy A. Rabkin, 1989
- Vision of the Exchange, William & Mary Law Review, 1986
- Judicialization of the Administrative Process: The Fine Print, National Legal Center for the Public Interest, 1986
- The End of the Constitution, 4 Detroit College of Law Review 1147 (1986)
- Judicialization: The Twilight of Administrative Law, 85 Duke L.J. 2 (1985)
- Judicial Review of Administrative Decisions, 7 Harvard Journal of Law and Public Policy 61 (1984)
- Business, Buck$ & Bull, The Corporation, The First Amendment & The Corrupt Practice of Law, 4 Delaware Journal of Corporate Law 1 (1978)
- He is co-author of Black America and Organized Labor: A Fair Deal?, The Lincoln Institute for Research and Education (1979).

Legal offices
Preceded by Joseph V. Colaianni	Judge of the United States Court of Federal Claims; 1985–2000	Succeeded by Sarah L. Wilson
Preceded by Alex Kozinski	Chief Judge of the United States Court of Federal Claims; 1986–2000	Succeeded by Lawrence Baskir
