= Robert H. Hodges Jr. =

American judge (born 1944)

Robert Hodges

Senior Judge of the United States Court of Federal Claims
- Incumbent
- Assumed office March 11, 2005

Judge of the United States Court of Federal Claims
- In office March 12, 1990 – March 11, 2005
- Appointed by: George H. W. Bush
- Preceded by: John Light Napier
- Succeeded by: Margaret M. Sweeney

Personal details
- Born: 1944 (age 81–82) Columbia, South Carolina, U.S.
- Education: Wofford College; University of South Carolina (BS, JD)

Military service
- Allegiance: United States
- Branch/service: United States Air Force
- Years of service: 1963–1969
- Unit: Air National Guard

Robert H. Hodges Jr. (born 1944) is a senior judge of the United States Court of Federal Claims. He joined the court in 1990 after being nominated by President George H. W. Bush. His term ended in 2005 and he assumed senior status.

== Early life, education, and career ==
Robert H. Hodges Jr. was born in Columbia, South Carolina, in 1944 and earned a Bachelor of Science from the University of South Carolina in 1966, conducting coursework at Wofford College prior to his time at the university. He went on to earn a Juris Doctor from University of South Carolina Law School in 1969.

Hodges was an Air National Guard airman first class from 1963 to 1969. He also was a Legislative aide for U.S. Senator Strom Thurmond from 1969 to 1971, and a Legislative assistant for U.S. Representative Floyd Spence from 1971 to 1977. Thereafter, he was Vice president of the First National Bank of South Carolina from 1977 to 1985, and Executive Vice president and general counsel of the South Carolina Bankers Association from 1985 to 1986. He continued his career in a private practice from 1986 to 1990.

=== Claims court service ===
On January 25, 1990, Robert was nominated by President George H. W. Bush to serve as a judge of the United States Court of Federal Claims to a seat vacated by Judge John Light Napier. Hodges was confirmed by the United States Senate on March 9, 1990, and received his commission on March 12, 1990. He assumed senior status on March 11, 2005.

Legal offices
Preceded by John Light Napier	Judge of the United States Court of Federal Claims; 1990–2005	Succeeded by Margaret M. Sweeney
