= Federal Courts Improvement Act =

The Federal Courts Improvement Act, 96 Stat. 25., was a law enacted by the United States Congress on April 2, 1982, which established the United States Court of Appeals for the Federal Circuit and the United States Claims Court (later changed to the United States Court of Federal Claims). The statute was intended to promote greater uniformity in certain areas of federal jurisdiction and relieve the pressure on the dockets of the Supreme Court and the courts of appeals for the regional circuits.

== History ==
In 1971, a committee appointed by Chief Justice Warren Burger proposed the creation of a National Court of Appeals that would decide cases and screen petitions for appeal to the United States Supreme Court. The 1975 report of the Commission on Revision of the Federal Court Appellate System proposed a like-named court that would determine national law and resolve inter-circuit conflicts by deciding certain categories of cases referred to it by the Supreme Court and the courts of appeals. Congress rejected both proposals for a national court of appeals, but the studies drew attention to the problems associated with the lack of uniform rulings in specialized areas of jurisdiction.

A proposal drafted by the Department of Justice led President Jimmy Carter to request in 1979 that Congress establish a court of appeals for a Federal Circuit, to be on the same jurisdictional level as the other U.S. courts of appeals. The proposed court would combine the functions of the Court of Customs and Patent Appeals with those of the U.S. Court of Claims, and the president also urged Congress to consider vesting the proposed court with the jurisdiction to promote uniformity and predictability in federal tax cases. The House and Senate failed to complete consideration of the bill before the end of Carter's term. The legislation was reintroduced in 1981, based on an endorsement by the Judicial Conference of the United States and support from business leaders.

== Effect ==
The act established the United States Court of Appeals for the Federal Circuit, which became the only U.S. court of appeals defined exclusively by its jurisdiction rather than geographical boundaries. This new court assumed the jurisdiction of the U.S. Court of Customs and Patent Appeals and the appellate jurisdiction of the U.S. Court of Claims. The new court was authorized to hear appeals from several federal administrative boards as well. Congress abolished the Court of Customs and Patent Appeals and the U.S. Court of Claims, reassigning the twelve judges of those courts to serve on the Federal Circuit court. The act of 1982 also established a U.S. Claims Court (now the U.S. Court of Federal Claims), and reassigned the sitting trial judges of the U.S. Court of Claims to the new claims court.

Congress extended the jurisdiction of the Federal Circuit to the review of appeals from the United States Court of International Trade, the United States Merit Systems Protection Board, the Civilian Board of Contract Appeals, and certain administrative decisions of the secretaries of Agriculture and Commerce, as well as all appeals related to patents. Congress rejected the controversial proposals to grant the Federal Circuit court jurisdiction over appeals of tax and environmental cases.

== Attribution ==
Material on this page was adapted from the website of the Federal Judicial Center, a public domain repository of information about federal courts in the United States.
