= Johnny Olszewski =

American politician (born 1982)

- Official portrait, 2026

Member of the U.S. House of Representatives from Maryland's 2nd district
- Incumbent
- Assumed office January 3, 2025
- Preceded by: Dutch Ruppersberger

14th Executive of Baltimore County
- In office December 3, 2018 – January 3, 2025
- Preceded by: Donald Mohler
- Succeeded by: D'Andrea Walker (acting)

Member of the Maryland House of Delegates from the 6th district
- In office June 12, 2006 – January 14, 2015
- Preceded by: John S. Arnick
- Succeeded by: Robin Grammer Jr.

Personal details
- Born: John Anthony Olszewski Jr. September 10, 1982 (age 44) Baltimore, Maryland, U.S.
- Party: Democratic
- Spouse: Marisa Azzone (m. 2005)
- Children: 1
- Education: Goucher College (BA); George Washington University (MA); University of Maryland, Baltimore County (PhD)
- Website: House website Campaign website
- Olszewski's voice Olszewski on two year anniversary of the Francis Scott Key Bridge collapse. Recorded March 26, 2026

John Anthony Olszewski Jr. (/oʊˈʃɛski/ oh-SHESK-ee; born September 10, 1982), also known by his nickname Johnny O, is an American politician who has served as a member of the U.S. House of Representatives from Maryland's 2nd congressional district since 2025. A member of the Democratic Party, he served as the 14th county executive of Baltimore County, Maryland, from 2018 to 2025.

Olszewski served as a student member of the Baltimore County Board of Education from 1999 to 2000, and two terms in the Maryland House of Delegates representing the 6th district from 2006 to 2015. The district covered most of the southeastern portion of Baltimore County, including the town of Dundalk, Maryland. Olszewski unsuccessfully ran for the Maryland Senate in District 6 in 2014, narrowly losing to Republican challenger Johnny Ray Salling. Olszewski became Baltimore County Executive in 2018 after narrowly defeating state senator James Brochin in the 2018 Democratic primary election and defeating former state Insurance Commissioner Alfred W. Redmer Jr. in the general election. Olszewski was re-elected in 2022, defeating Republican nominee Pat McDonough.

Olszewski was elected to the U.S. House of Representatives in 2024, after defeating Republican radio host Kimberly Klacik in the general election. He was sworn in on January 3, 2025.

== Early life and education ==
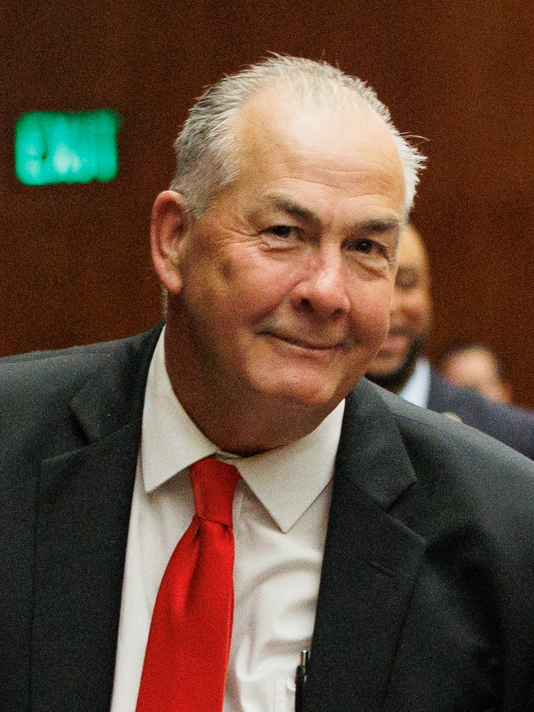
John Olszewski Sr. (pictured in 2024)

Olszewski was the eldest of three sons born to father John Olszewski, a lobbyist and a former member of the Baltimore County Council from 1998 to 2014, and mother Sherry Olszewski (née Crusse). He was raised in Dundalk, Maryland, and graduated from Sparrows Point High School in 2000.

Following high school, Olszewski attended Goucher College, from which he graduated with a bachelor's in political science and American studies. After college, Olszewski pursued a master's in political management from George Washington University, which he obtained in 2006. In 2017, Olszewski earned a doctorate from the University of Maryland, Baltimore County.

== Early political career ==
Olszewski was appointed to the Baltimore County Board of Education as the student member of the board, serving from 1999 to 2000. He was later elected to a term on the Maryland Democratic State Central Committee, serving from 2002 to 2006. After graduating from Goucher, Olszewski began teaching social studies and special education at Patapsco High School and Center for the Arts for five years and worked as a countywide resource teacher for two years.

== Maryland House of Delegates ==
In June 2006, Olszewski was nominated by the Baltimore County Democratic Central Committee to fill the seat left by the resignation of John S. Arnick, who had been appointed to the Maryland Board of Contract Appeals. Governor Bob Ehrlich appointed Olszewski to the seat on June 10, and he was sworn in on June 12. Olszewski was elected to a full four-year term in 2006 and subsequently re-elected in 2010.

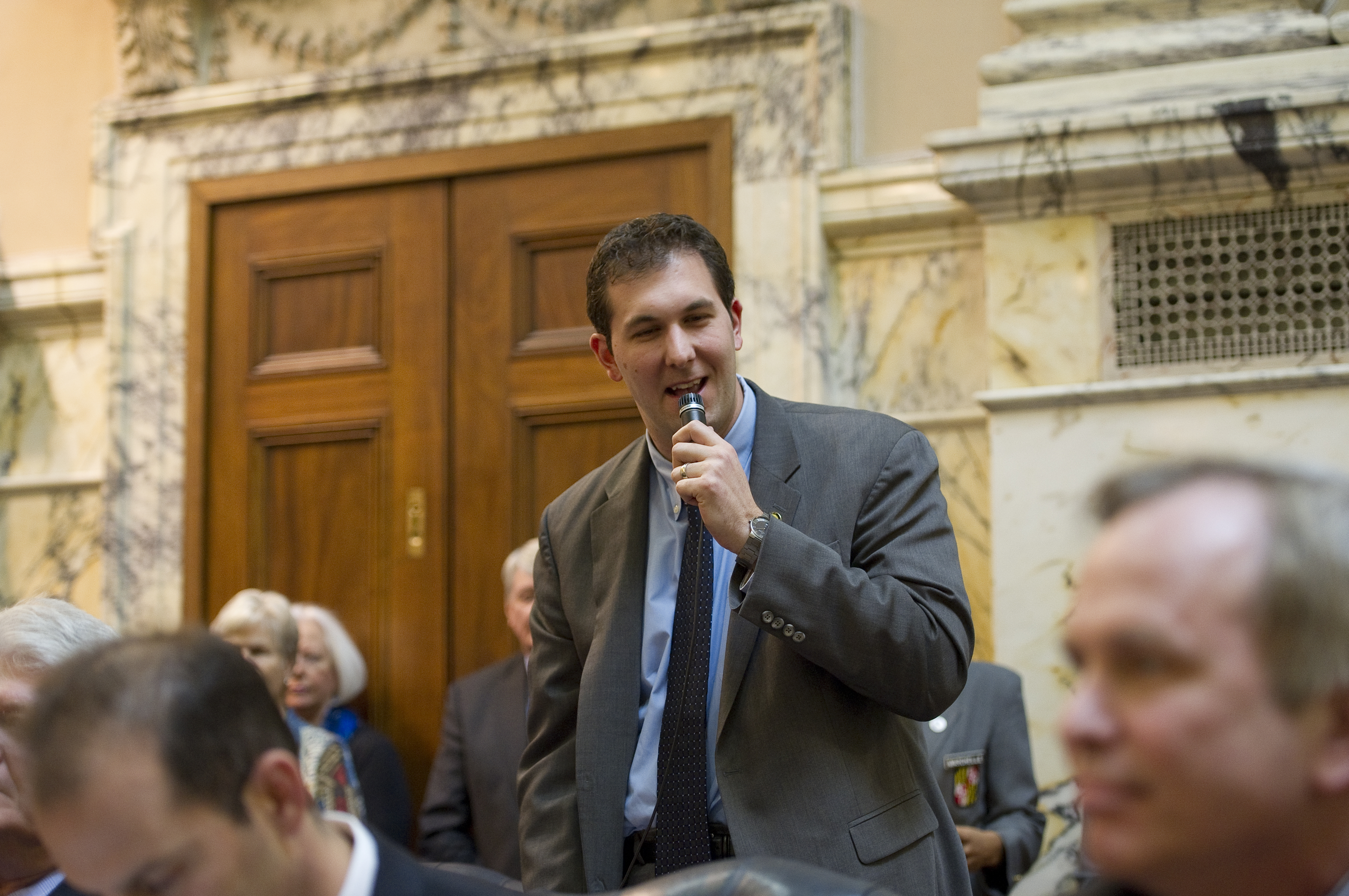
Olszewski in the Maryland House of Delegates, 2012

In the legislature, Olszewski was a member of the Environmental Matters Committee in 2006, afterwards serving in the Ways and Means Committee until 2010 and then the Economic Matters Committee until 2015. In 2011, he was elected as chairman of the Baltimore County Delegation, making him the youngest person to ever fill that role. In 2012, Olszewski served as a delegate to the Democratic National Convention, pledged to President Barack Obama.

In July 2013, Olszewski announced that he would run for the Maryland Senate, seeking to succeed Norman R. Stone Jr., who had announced that he would retire at the end of his term in 2014. The district was targeted by the Maryland Republican Party during the 2014 Maryland Senate election following declining union membership in the Dundalk area, and Olszewski specifically was targeted for his vote for Maryland's "Rain Tax". In the general election, Olszewski faced Republican candidate Johnny Ray Salling and unaffiliated candidate Scott Collier. Olszewski was defeated by Salling in the general election by a margin of 851 votes, or by 2.8 percent.

Following his defeat, Olszewski worked as a senior account executive at SAS Institute. He also created a group called A Better Baltimore County to travel across the county and listen to voters' concerns, and worked as a lobbyist in Baltimore's transportation department, promoting issues such as the Baltimore Red Line.

== Baltimore County Executive ==
=== Tenure ===
2018 Democratic primary results by precinct Olszewski: 30–40%; 40–50%; 50–60%; 60–70%; Brochin: 30–40%; 40–50%; 50–60%; 60–70%; 70–80%; 80–90%; Almond: 30–40%; 40–50%; 50–60%; Tie: 30–40%; 40–50%

In April 2017, the Dundalk Eagle reported that Olszewski was considering a run for Baltimore County Executive, seeking to succeed Kevin Kamenetz, who was term-limited. On June 27, 2017, Olszewski announced his candidacy in the 2018 Baltimore County Executive election. In the Democratic primary, he faced state senator James Brochin and county councilwoman Vicki Almond. He received endorsements from The Baltimore Sun, state delegate Stephen W. Lafferty, the Baltimore-D.C. Building Trades Unions, and former governor Martin O'Malley. Olszewski won the Democratic primary in June 2018, edging out Brochin by nine votes. Following a recount, Olszewski's lead over Brochin expanded to 17 votes. In the general election, Olszewski faced former Republican state delegate Alfred W. Redmer Jr., who sought to tie Olszewski to Democratic gubernatorial nominee Ben Jealous. Olszewski re-positioned himself from being a "progressive Democrat" to pitching a message of bipartisanship. Olszewski defeated Redmer in the general election on November 6, 2018, receiving 57.8 percent of the vote to Redmer's 42 percent.

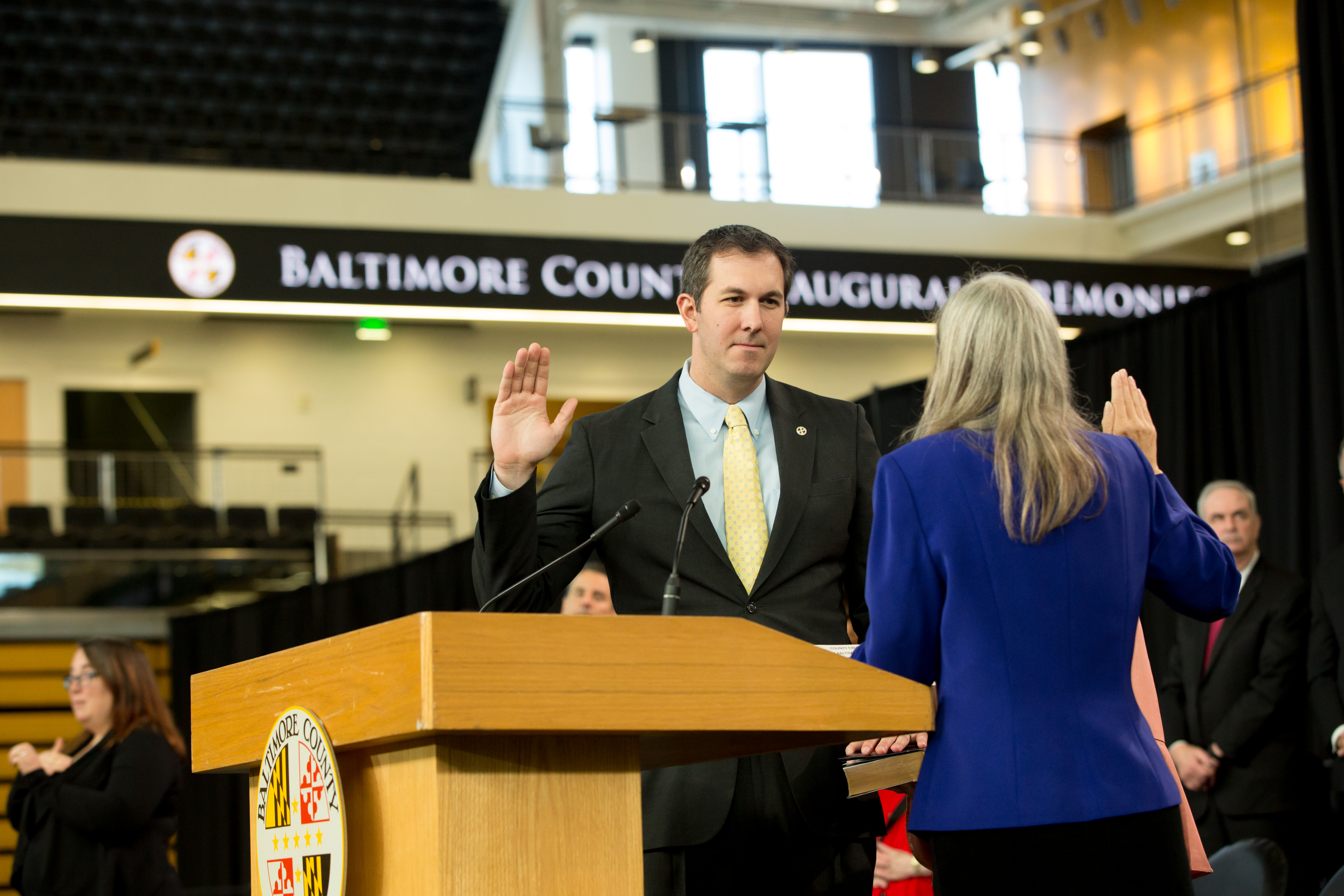
Olszewski being sworn in as county executive, 2018

Olszewski was sworn in as Baltimore County Executive on December 3, 2018. Sworn in at the age of 36, he is the youngest person to serve as Baltimore County Executive. Olszewski was re-elected in 2022, in which he defeated former state delegate Pat McDonough with 63.7 percent of the vote.

During his tenure as county executive, Olszewski supported legislation to ban source of income discrimination in housing, backed efforts to expand the county council, and established the Office of the Inspector General. In December 2023, he became the president of the Maryland Association of Counties, during which he criticized and sought to negotiate on Governor Wes Moore's proposal to cut $3.3 billion in state transportation funding. Olszewski was also an at-large delegate to the 2024 Democratic National Convention, pledged to Kamala Harris.

Olszewski resigned as county executive on January 3, 2025, after which county administrative officer D'Andrea Walker served as the acting county executive until the Baltimore County Council elected an interim successor. The county council began accepting applications from interested candidates on November 6, 2024, receiving twelve applications from candidates seeking to succeed Olszewski, though two of these candidates would later drop out of the race. Following a public feedback event in December 2024, the Baltimore County Council narrowed the list of potential county executive applicants to five finalists. Olszewski declined to say who he supported in the contest to succeed him as county executive, but said he wanted the county council would select a female or Black contender and opposed contenders who propose deep cuts to county services—a remark aimed at former state senator James Brochin, who promised to cut the funding of every county agency except for public safety by 10–20 percent. On January 7, 2025, the Baltimore County Council voted to elect state senator Kathy Klausmeier to succeed Olszewski as county executive.

=== COVID-19 pandemic ===
On March 12, 2020, the Maryland Department of Health confirmed the first case of COVID-19 in Baltimore County, Maryland. Later that night, Olszewski announced that the county would close all senior centers and would immediately suspend all nonessential out-of-state travel for employees. On March 24, Olszewski requested support from the Maryland National Guard to provide humanitarian and emergency management assistance in Baltimore County. On April 12, after President Donald Trump ordered General Motors to begin manufacturing ventilators for COVID-19 patients at auto plants, Olszewski asked Trump to reopen its shuttered plant in White Marsh for the same purpose.

After Governor Larry Hogan announced the start of the state's partial reopening on May 13, Olszewski said they would take "a close look" at Hogan's actions and determine their course in the next 24 hours. At the time, Baltimore County had 12 percent of the state's case count. On May 14, Olszewski said that most restrictions would remain in effect. On May 20, Olszewski signed onto a letter expressing concern about the consequences of Hogan's partial reopening and asking for guidance from the administration as they decided how to proceed. He also announced that appointment-free drive-through testing would be available at the Maryland State Fairgrounds. On June 10, after Governor Hogan announced the next stage of the state's partial reopening, Olszewski said he would review the governor's executive order before deciding whether to follow it.

In July 2020, as hospitalization rates began to rise again, Olszewski issued a new indoor mask mandate and chastised Governor Hogan for being "absent" from weekly briefings with Maryland's eight largest counties and Baltimore City, urging him to return to their weekly dialogue. He also signed onto a letter demanding that Hogan adopt a mail-in election format for the November 3 general election. In September, Olszewski proposed allocating $3 million in federal relief funds for the county's rental assistance program to help alleviate the amount of evictions following the end of the state's eviction moratorium. In November, Olszewski issued an executive order banning social gatherings larger than 25 people and formed a task force to inspect more than 7,000 establishments in Baltimore County to ensure that they were complying with COVID-19 orders. In December, Olszewski signed an executive order blocking restaurants from collecting more than 15 percent in commission from food delivery app orders.

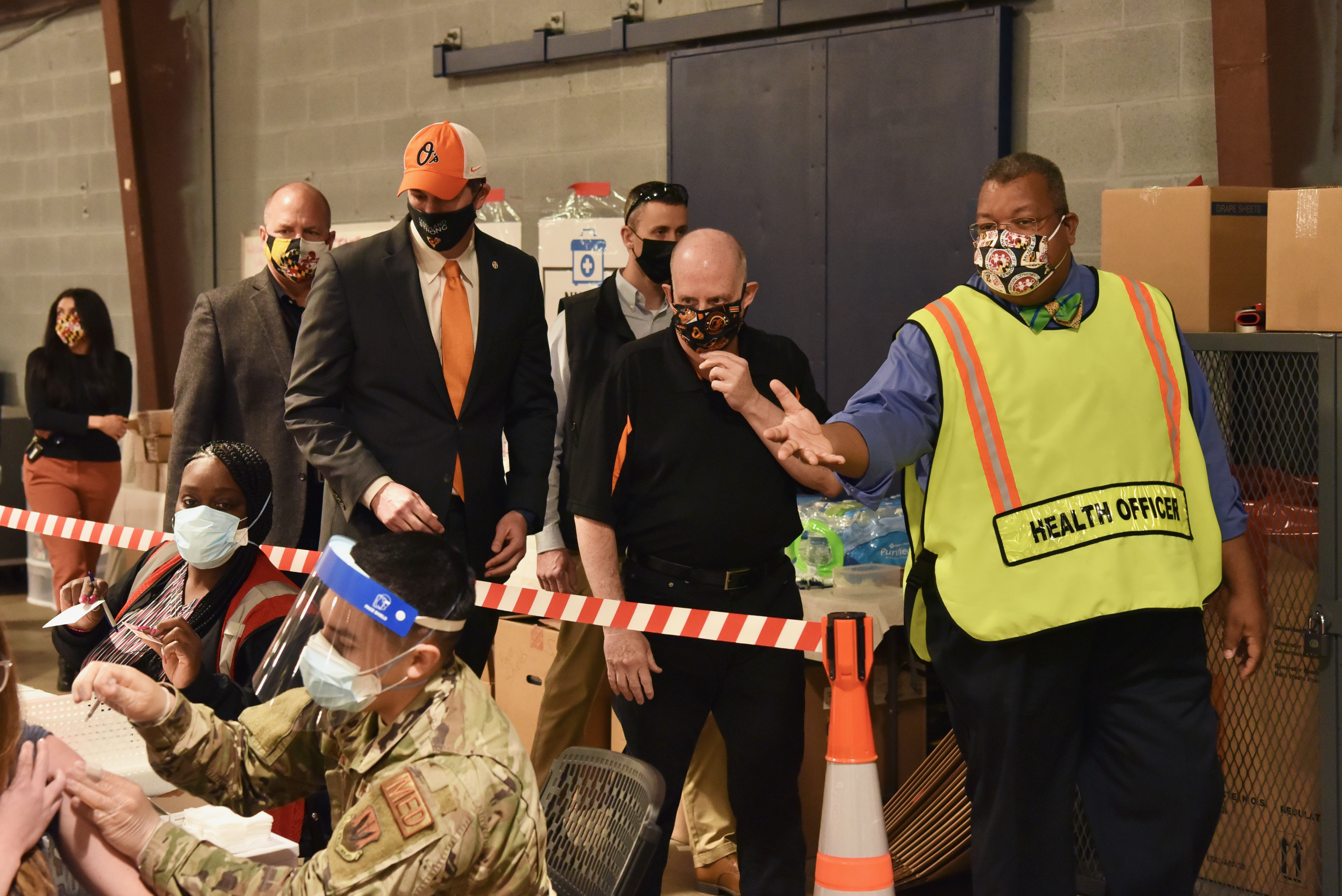
Olszewski and Governor Larry Hogan tour the Maryland State Fairgrounds mass vaccination site, 2021

In January 2021, Olszewski opened the county's first vaccination clinic at the Maryland State Fairgrounds. Governor Hogan called the Fairgrounds vaccination clinic the "best operation in the state" and later announced in March 2021 that it would be converted to a mass vaccination site in partnership with Baltimore County. In June 2021, after Governor Hogan lifted most of the state's COVID-19 restrictions, Olszewski said he would allow the county's state of emergency declaration to expire on July 9. In August 2021, Olszewski issued a new indoor masking requirement and declared a new state of emergency following a spike in cases of the Delta variant. In December 2021, Olszewski declared a new state of emergency and again required indoor masking amid a surge in cases of the omicron variant. On February 14, 2022, Olszewski announced that the county would lift its indoor mask mandate and end required COVID-19 testing for unvaccinated employees.

=== Ethics controversies ===
In July 2021, Olszewski proposed legislation to create a board consisting of political appointees to oversee the Baltimore County inspector general, an office which he created. This proposal was later dropped following backlash over the makeup of the board. In October 2021, Olszewski created an independent Commission on Ethics and Accountability to review the county's ethics laws and examine the office of the inspector general. In April 2022, the Baltimore County Council voted 6–1 to approve paying a contractor $99,000 to help the commission. The commission began its work on June 5, 2022, and released its final report on February 17, 2023, which provided several recommended changes for the office, but was not in favor of creating an oversight board of the county inspector general. In May 2023, Olszewski said he would not create an oversight board for the inspector general. In October 2023, Olszewski proposed legislation to codify the powers and responsibilities of the county's inspector general's office into the county charter and to strengthen the office's subpoena powers. The legislation passed and was approved by Baltimore County voters during the 2024 elections.

In December 2021, Baltimore County inspector general Kelly Madigan opened an investigation into Olszewski's aides intervening to approve the application of David Cordish, a wealthy Baltimore County developer, for an indoor "tennis barn" next to his Greenspring Valley home. Cordish was initially instructed to schedule an administrative hearing to get permission to build the tennis barn, as the structure was deemed too big to be an accessory structure for his residence under county zoning laws. However, then-county permit director Mike Millanoff gave approval to Cordish's tennis barn without an administrative hearing. In July 2022, the Baltimore County inspector general found that it appeared Cordish was given "preferential treatment" to build an indoor tennis facility when key zoning approvals were given, despite the opposition from some within the permits department. Cordish's "tennis barn" was never built.

In June 2022, the Baltimore Brew reported that Olszewski reversed his administration's disapproval of a proposal to build the Eagle Transfer Station, which would be the county's first privately owned solid waste transfer station, after attending a fundraiser sponsored by Jackson Haden, who submitted the proposal for the transfer station. A spokesperson for Olszewski denied that the fundraiser influenced his decision to approve the transfer station. After the story broke, the Baltimore County inspector general reportedly opened an investigation into the approval of the Eagle Transfer Station and Olszewski indefinitely postponed a county council vote approving the transfer station. In April 2024, the Baltimore Brew reported that officials in Olszewski's administration advocated for an investigation into Michael Beichler, the county's former chief of solid waste management who reported the Eagle Transfer Station controversy to the Brew, for entering a county Public Works and Transportation facility after ordinary business hours and leaving the area with a box. The three-week investigation, which was suspended after a county assistant state's attorney notified the detective of the complaint, found no evidence of theft or damage of county property.

In July 2024, the Baltimore Brew reported that the Olszewski administration used $550,000 in public funds to shield the details of the county's 2020 settlement with Philip Tirabassi, a former firefighter who was the brother of John Tirabassi, who was one of Olszewski's personal friends. After the Baltimore Sun reported on the story, Olszewski said that the settlement was made after Philip Tirabassi threatened to sue the county after it tried backing out of an unauthorized agreement sent by a former county lawyer in early 2020, adding that he did not have any personal relationships with Tirabassi and denied that he approved the settlement as a favor to his friend's brother. Tirabassi's attorney told the Baltimore Sun later that month that the Olszewski administration sought to renege on the settlement before enforcing the agreement and denied that the payment was made as a favor to Tirabassi's brother. The Baltimore Brew and The Baltimore Sun also reported that the Tirabassi brothers handled personal real estate transactions for Olszewski from 2016 to 2020, and the Baltimore Sun reported that the Olszewski administration paid $4.2 million to buy dump trucks from Peterbilt, which employed John Tirabassi as a regional sales representative. A county spokesperson told the Sun that Olszewski only dealt directly with Tirabassi on the real estate transactions and denied that their relationship played a role in the county's Peterbilt purchase, saying that Olszewski was not aware of or involved with Tirabassi's company's contract with Baltimore County. In December 2024, the Baltimore County inspector general found no wrongdoing related to the Tirabassi settlement or the procurement of the 16 Peterbilt trucks.

In September 2024, county councilmember Mike Ertel questioned the county's $2.25 million purchase of an 8.5-acre parcel of land located less than a mile away from Olszewski's house, noting that the county used its own money to purchase the land instead of using state funding through Program Open Space. The Baltimore Banner reported that the land was sold to the county by Norman Anderson and Catherine Staszak, who were both longtime contributors to both Olszewski and his father, though Olszewski said that he didn't know either seller. Olszewski defended the county's purchase of the land—which is set to be developed into a kayak launch and park—saying that he doesn't involve himself in county land transactions and that county department officials used the same process for the acquisition as they did for previous purchases.

== U.S. House of Representatives ==
=== Elections ===
==== 2024 ====
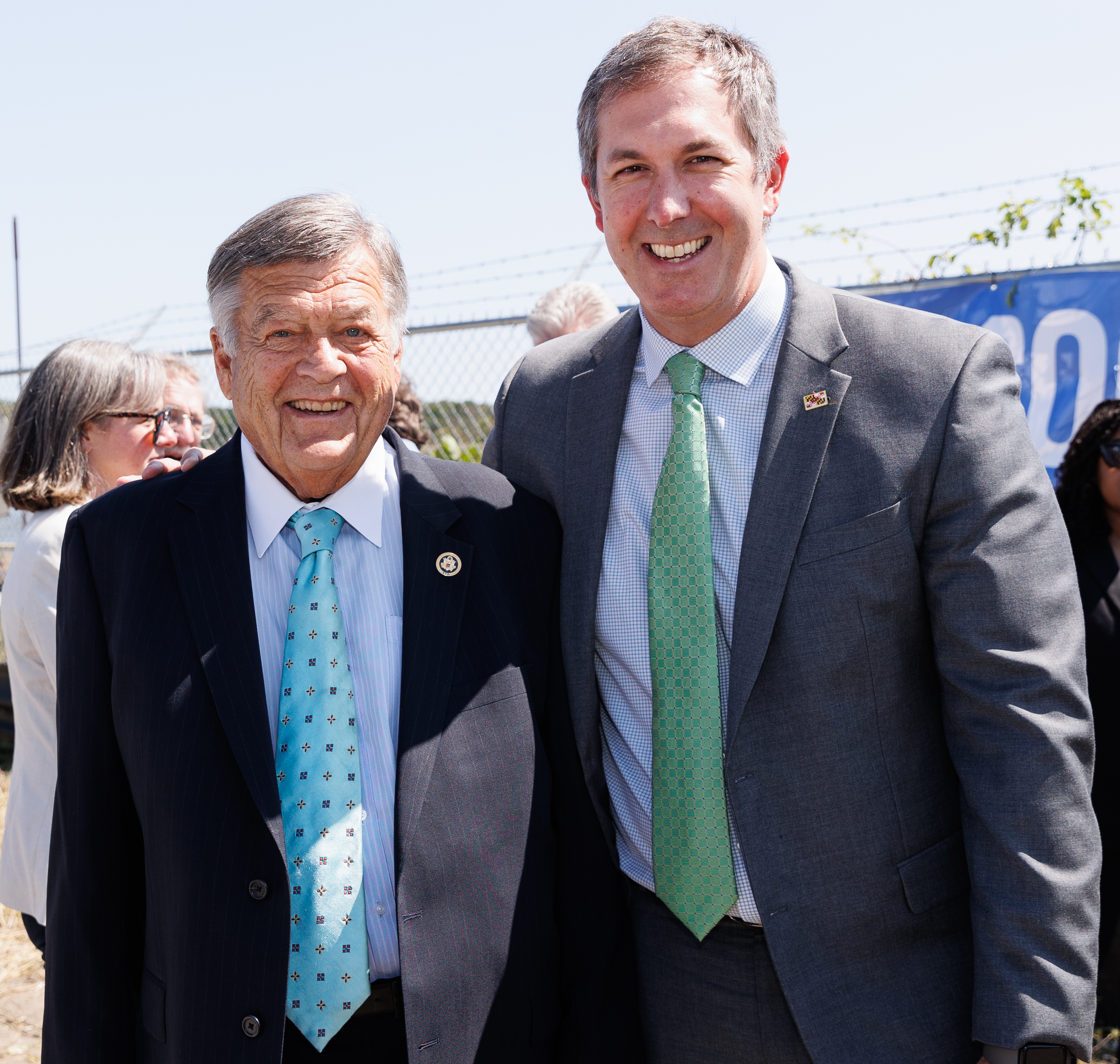
Olszewski with his predecessor, Dutch Ruppersberger, 2024

Olszewski was seen as a possible candidate for the 2024 United States Senate election in Maryland after Ben Cardin announced he would not seek re-election, but he declined to run, endorsing Prince George's County Executive Angela Alsobrooks instead. He launched an exploratory committee into running for Maryland's 2nd congressional district in June 2023, and, after incumbent Dutch Ruppersberger announced his retirement in late January 2024, announced his candidacy for the race to succeed him on January 30, 2024. Olszewski was viewed as the frontrunner in the Democratic primary, leading his opponents in fundraising and receiving endorsements from Ruppersberger, state House Speaker Adrienne A. Jones, and Baltimore mayor Brandon Scott. Olszewski temporarily paused campaigning following the Francis Scott Key Bridge collapse.

Olszewski won the Democratic primary election on May 14, 2024, with 78.7 percent of the vote, and defeated former WBAL-AM radio host Kimberly Klacik in the general election. In the general election, Olszewski was viewed as the frontrunner against Klacik, who he sought to associate with Republican presidential nominee Donald Trump, and campaigned on the issues of reproductive freedom and protecting Medicare and Social Security.

==== 2026 ====
Olszewski ran for reelection in 2026 winning easily winning renomination with over 85% of the vote. During the campaign, he focused on taking on the Trump administration and its policies. After winning the election, he said he would target a seat on the Ways and Means Committee in the 120th Congress.

=== Tenure ===
Olszewski was sworn in on January 3, 2025. Before the 119th Congress, Olszewski was elected freshman class representative to the House Democratic Steering and Policy Committee, defeating New Jersey freshman U.S. Representative Herb Conaway.

=== Committee assignments ===
For the 119th Congress:

- Committee on Foreign Affairs
  - Subcommittee on Africa
  - Subcommittee on East Asia and Pacific
- Committee on Small Business
  - Subcommittee on Innovation, Entrepreneurship, and Workforce Development
  - Subcommittee on Rural Development, Energy, and Supply Chains

=== Caucus memberships ===
- Congressional Dads' Caucus
- Congressional Equality Caucus
- Congressional NextGen 9-1-1 Caucus
- Future Forum
- Labor Caucus
- New Democrat Coalition

== Political positions ==
While in the Maryland House of Delegates, Olszewski was described as a blue-collar, pro-labor but socially conservative Democrat. During his county executive campaign, he described himself as being both a "principled Democrat" as well as a "progressive Democrat". Olszewski voted with President Donald Trump's stated position 13.6% of the time in the 119th Congress through 2025, according to a VoteHub analysis.

=== Crime and policing ===
In September 2020, following the murder of George Floyd, Olszewski introduced legislation to ban police chokeholds, provide additional protections to police whistleblowers, and require officers to intervene when colleagues use excessive force. The bill passed and became law. In February 2023, following the shooting death of 17-year-old Tre'shaun Harmon in Towson, Maryland, Olszewski pledged additional security measures in downtown Towson.

In September 2025, amid threats from President Donald Trump to deploy the National Guard in Baltimore to conduct municipal policing, Olszewski signed onto a letter to Trump urging him to reconsider, citing the city's lower crime statistics, community policing, and violence reduction programs.

=== Education ===
During his tenure as the student member of the Baltimore County Board of Education, Olszewski lobbied for a bill that would provide the student member of the Baltimore County Board of Education with full voting rights.

During his county executive campaign, Olszewski said he would provide $2 billion toward school renovations, raise teacher salaries by 20 percent, expand tuition-free community college, and creating universal pre-kindergarten. He said he would fund these policies by scaling back the county's $300 million program to buy laptops and tablets for all students and through economic growth and more efficient tax spending. He also promised to build three new high schools, but only built one in Landsowne during his six years as county executive. In April 2023, Olszewski proposed allocating $70 million toward increasing teacher salaries and expanding the county's free community college program. The budget was unanimously passed by the Baltimore County Council on May 25, 2023.

Olszewski supports the Blueprint for Maryland's Future, a sweeping education reform package passed by the Maryland General Assembly in 2020. In January 2020, Olszewski testified in support of the Built to Learn Act, a bill that would allow the Maryland Stadium Authority to issue up to $2.2 billion in bonds to pay for school construction projects.

=== Electoral and ethical reform ===
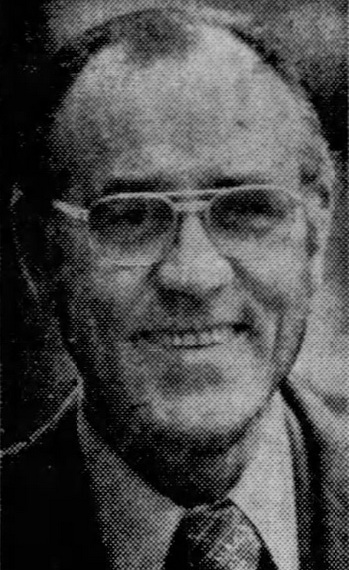
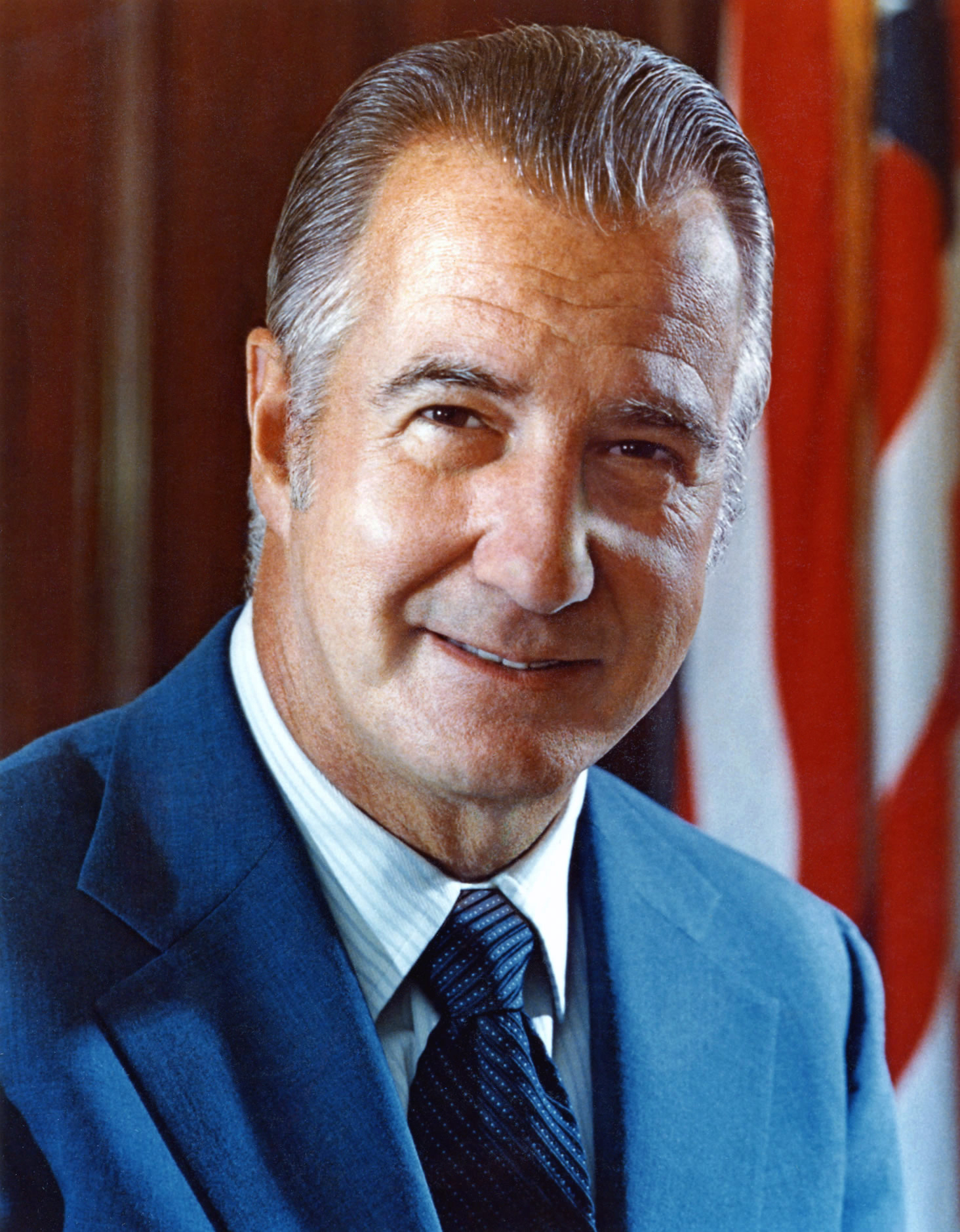
Olszewski cited the federal convictions of former county executives Dale Anderson (left) and Spiro Agnew (right) in strengthening the county's ethics and transparency laws.

During his county executive campaign, Olszewski said he supported establishing a public campaign finance system for Baltimore County elections. In January 2019, he proposed an ethics reform package that included the creation of a public campaign finance system and the Office of Ethics and Accountability, prohibiting outgoing county officials from lobbying county government, and posting all lobbyist registrations online. Voters approved the charter amendment creating the public campaign financing system during the 2020 elections, with 57.1 percent of voters supporting the measure. In March 2021, Olszewski appointed a work group to make recommendations on how the county's public campaign financing system would work. The work group released its findings in November 2021, which were implemented through the Fair Election Fund. In February 2022, Olszewski testified in support of a bill that would allow local governments to expand public campaign finance programs to include more elected offices. During his 2024 congressional campaign, he supported expanding the county's public campaign finance system to congressional campaigns.

In March 2022, after the Baltimore County NAACP successfully sued to strike down the county's councilmanic redistricting plan for not having enough majority-Black districts, Olszewski called on councilmembers to pass a new map that does so. County council chair Julian Jones ultimately proposed a new map that once again only had a single majority-Black district, which was approved by U.S. District Court Judge Lydia Griggsby later that month.

During the 2023 legislative session, Olszewski supported a bill to move Maryland's 2024 primary date from April 23 to May 14, 2024, citing that April 23 was the first full day of Passover; the bill was signed into law by Governor Moore on May 11, 2023.

In October 2023, Olszewski supported a resolution to study expanding the county council. The task force created by the resolution recommended in March 2024 expanding the county council from seven to nine members, and the Baltimore County Council voted in July 2024 to create a ballot referendum on whether to do so. Olszewski subsequently endorsed the referendum, citing the county's population growth, and backed another citizen-led ballot initiative that would have expanded the county council by four members, but did not receive enough signatures to make it onto the ballot. Voters approved the referendum expanding the county council to nine members on November 5, 2024.

In January 2026, after the Governor's Redistricting Advisory Commission proposed a new congressional map that would redraw the 2nd congressional district to include portions of Harford and Anne Arundel counties, Olszewski blamed President Donald Trump and Texas Republicans for "starting this race to the bottom" by redrawing Texas's congressional districts to benefit Republicans and called on Congress to pass national redistricting reform.

In May 2026, Olszewski introduced a bill that would establish 18-year term limits for U.S. Supreme Court Justices.

=== Environment ===
During the 2007 legislative session, after AES Corporation proposed building a new liquefied natural gas facility in Dundalk, Maryland, Olszewski introduced a bill that would impose an impact fee on LNG-related development in Baltimore County. In 2013, Olszewski introduced a bill that would remove subsidies going to facilities that produce black liquor, redirecting it toward wind, solar, and other renewable energy sources. The bill was rejected by the House Economic Matters Committee by a 11–8 vote, one vote short of the 12-vote majority needed to pass.

During his 2018 county executive campaign, Olszewski pledged to create a timeline for county government entirely to renewable energy sources. In 2019, he created a new "chief sustainability officer" position within the government. In February 2021, Olszewski spoke in support of a bill that would establish an Office on Climate Change within the governor's office to combat climate change. In April 2021, Olszewski set a goal of using 100 percent renewable energy for government operations by 2026.

During his tenure as county executive, Olszewski's administration sought to increase the county's unofficial goal of maintaining a 50 percent tree canopy, which it accomplished through a series of tree planting initiatives focusing on urban and poorer communities in the county. In November 2021, Olszewski unveiled a planting program that would offer free trees to low-income, densely populated neighborhoods to reduce heat islands in urban parts of the county. As of December 2024, the county's tree planting program has planted more than 7,100 native trees across 46 communities.

In January 2023, Olszewski and Baltimore mayor Brandon Scott said they supported a bill that would establish the Task Force on Regional Water and Wastewater to modernize the governance of the Back River Wastewater Treatment Plant, the Baltimore-area region's water and wastewater utility. The bill was signed into law by Governor Wes Moore on April 11, 2023. In March 2023, Olszewski expressed concerns with a plan to process 675,000 gallons of wastewater from the 2023 Ohio train derailment at the Back River Wastewater Treatment Plant; the wastewater processing plan was blocked by Scott, who directed the Baltimore Department of Public Works to prohibit treated water from entering the city's water system.

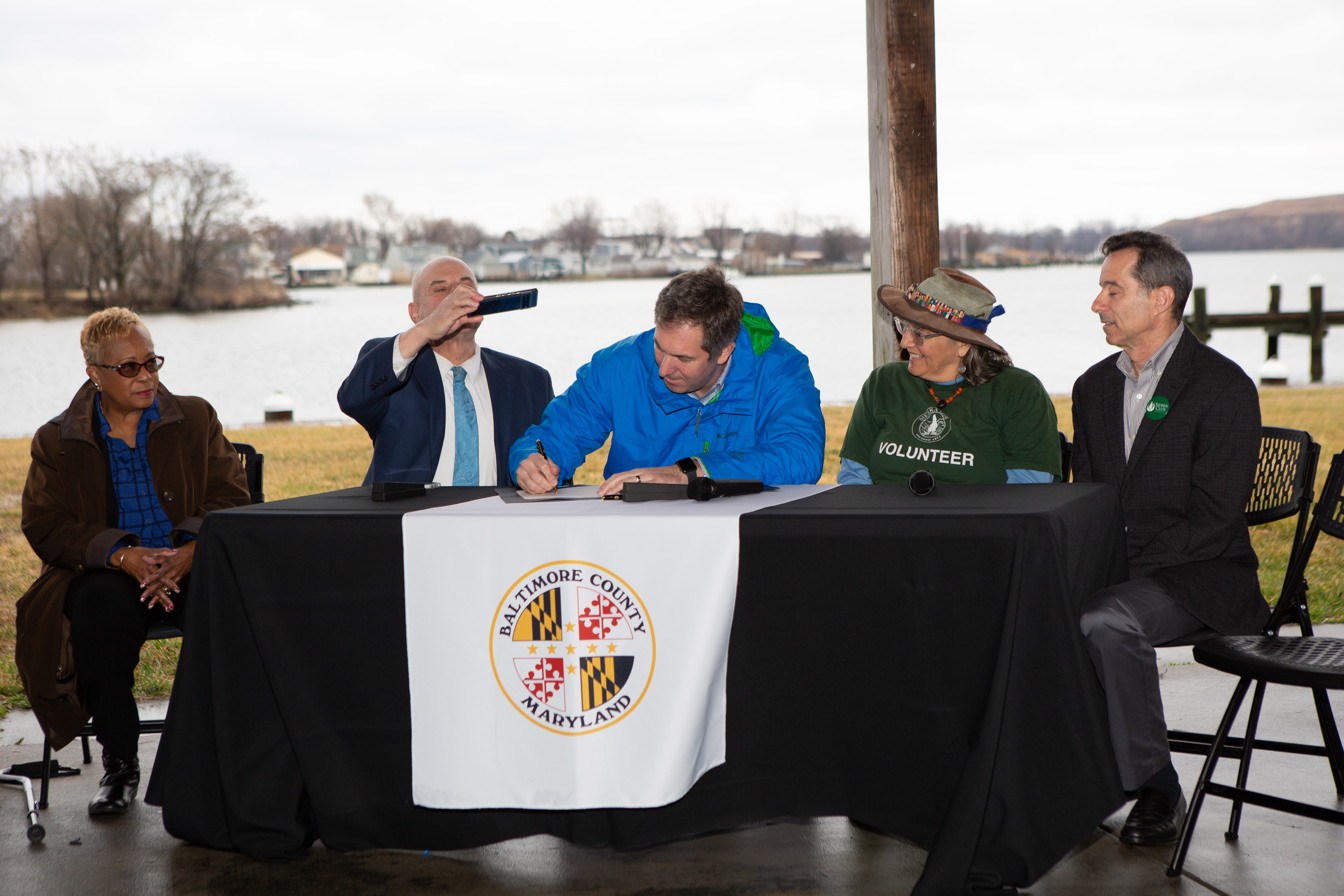
Olszewski signs the Bring Your Own Bag Act, 2023

In February 2023, Olszewski signed into law the Bring Your Own Bag Act, which incentivizes shoppers to bring their own bags when shopping for groceries by banning plastic bags at large retailers and charge customers $0.05 per paper bag in checkout. In October 2023, Olszewski vetoed a bill to allow stores to use thinner plastic bags and to exempt liquor stores from the plastic bag ban; the Baltimore County Council voted to override his veto on the liquor store exemption bill in early November, but failed to override the veto to allow thinner plastic bags.

=== Fiscal issues ===
During the 2013 legislative session, Olszewski introduced the Maryland Paid Sick and Safe Leave Act, a bill that would require employers to offer paid sick leave to their workers.

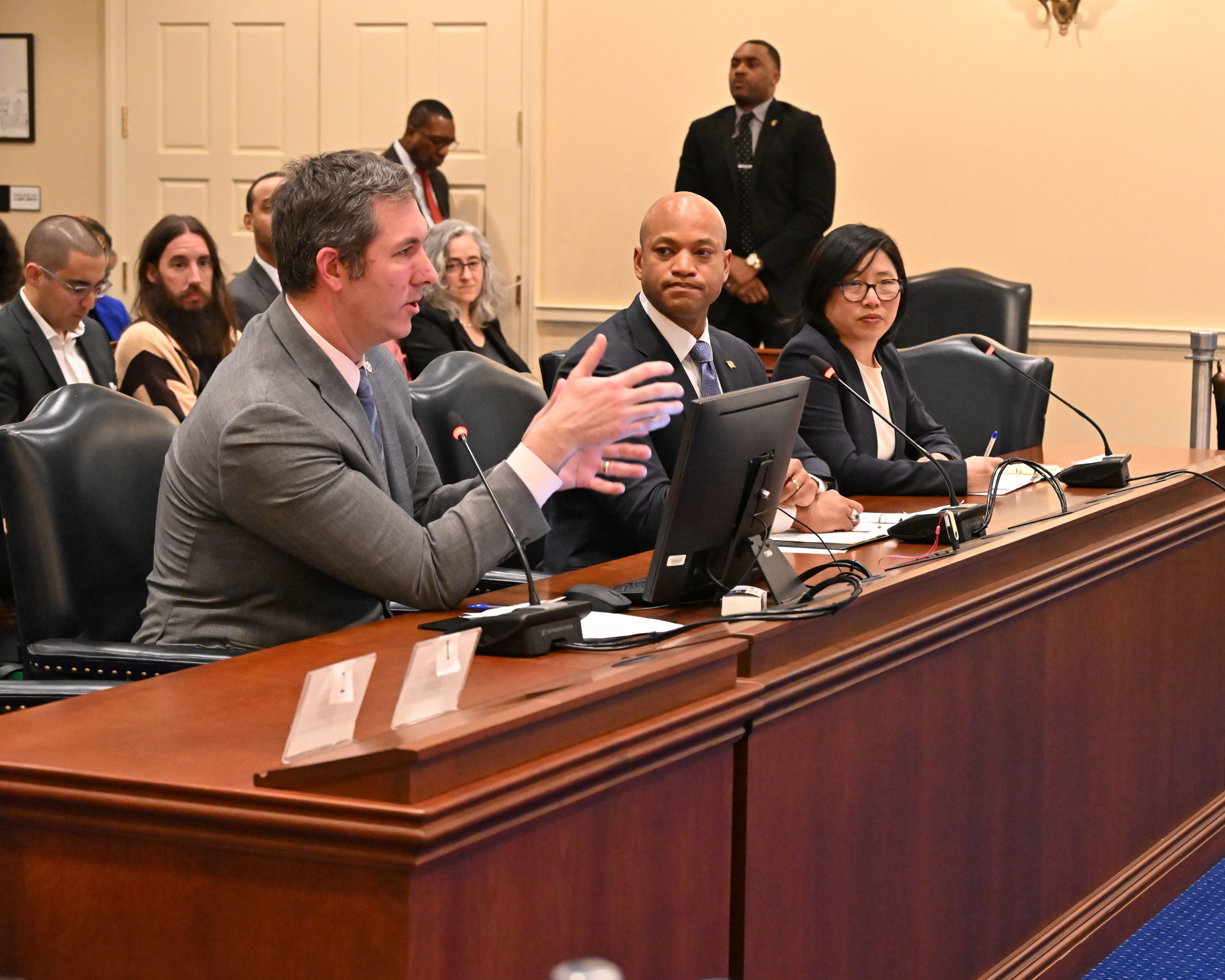
Olszewski testifies in support of the Fair Wage Act, 2023

During his county executive campaign, Olszewski said he supported raising the Maryland minimum wage to $15 an hour, saying that it would "give people a chance to earn a decent wage". During the 2019 legislative session, Olszewski testified in support of a bill that would raise the state's minimum wage to $15 an hour by 2026. In October 2020, Olszewski proposed legislation that would provide county workers with prevailing wages. In February 2023, Olszewski testified in support of the Fair Wage Act, a bill that would accelerate the state's incremental minimum wage increase to be $15 an hour by 2023 and index future increases to the consumer price index.

In January 2019, Olszewski denounced the 2018–2019 United States federal government shutdown and called on federal leaders to end the impasse. In March 2025, he opposed the Trump administration's efforts to fire and reclassify thousands of federal workers at various agencies and supported legislation that would require the Department of Government Efficiency to comply with Freedom of Information Act (FOIA) requests. In October 2025, Olszewski criticized threats by the Trump administration to fire federal employees during the 2025 United States federal government shutdown, saying that Trump was treating workers as "political pawns". In November 2025, Olszewski said he would vote against the bipartisan agreement to end the government shutdown, saying that "any budget deal that does not have protections against future cuts is not worth the paper it's written on".

In August 2025, Olszewski spoke at a union-organized rally at the Social Security Administration headquarters, where he said he would support the Protect America's Workforce Act, which would revoke an executive order signed by President Donald Trump that removed collective bargaining rights from workers at certain federal agencies.

=== Foreign policy ===
In February 2025, Olszewski participated in protests against the second Trump administration's decision to freeze nearly all foreign aid and shut down the U.S. Agency for International Development, which he argued would cede ground to countries like China.

==== China ====
In 2025, Olszewski co-introduced a bill to monitor Chinese efforts to build or buy shipping ports in foreign countries that could affect U.S. national security.

==== Iran ====
During an interview with Jewish Insider in January 2025, Olszewski said that he supported using "all the tools at America's disposal" to prevent Iran from becoming a nuclear power, including maximum pressure sanctions against the country and the use of force as a last resort option. In June 2025, after the American strikes on Iranian nuclear sites, he condemned President Donald Trump's bypassing of Congress's authority to declare war on other countries and said that he has yet to receive any "actionable intelligence" to suggest that Iran was on the verge of being nuclear-capable. Olszewski later co-sponsored the Iran War Powers Resolution. In January 2026, he supported Iranian protests against the country's government and economy, and stressed the need for U.S. action to aid protesters in their efforts against the government. In February 2026, Olszewski criticized further U.S. and Israeli strikes against Iran, citing Trump's campaign promises to end U.S. involvement in foreign wars and saying that the president "failed to explain the objective, the strategy, the risks, what comes next, and—most importantly—how this benefits America". In April 2026, after Trump threatened to destroy Iran's "whole civilization", Olszewski called on Trump's cabinet to use the process laid out in the fourth section of the 25th Amendment to remove the president from office.

==== Israel–Palestine ====
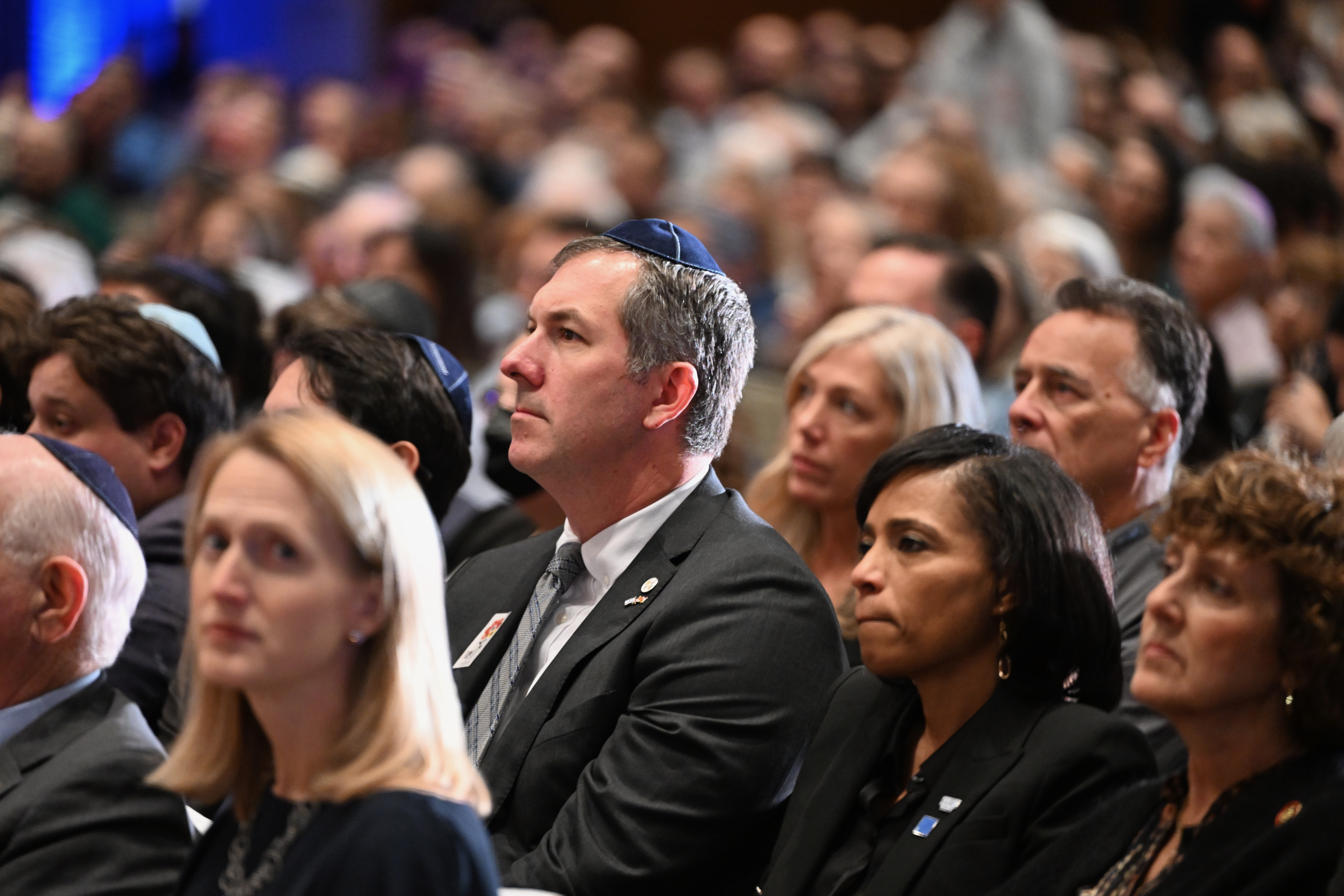
Olszewski attends services at Beth El Congregation on the anniversary of the October 7 attacks, 2024

During his 2018 Baltimore County executive campaign, Olszewski expressed support for Israel and endorsed legislation to codify Governor Larry Hogan's executive order prohibiting companies that supported the Boycott, Divestment and Sanctions movement from holding state contracts, suggesting that he could enact a similar executive order as county executive. In October 2023, following the October 7 attacks, he attended a rally in Baltimore supporting Israel and expressing solidarity with Jewish families affected by the attacks.

During his 2024 congressional campaign, Olszewski supported Israel's "right to exist and its right to defend itself" and a two-state solution to the Israeli–Palestinian conflict. In February 2024, he told Jewish Insider that he opposed calls for a ceasefire in the Gaza war, saying that while he wanted to see the war end and for the return of hostages held by Hamas, he believed that an immediate ceasefire would allow Hamas to remain in power and plan future attacks; however, in March 2024, he expressed support for a ceasefire alongside the release of hostages. He also condemned comments made by Maryland Council on American–Islamic Relations director Zainab Chaudry that compared Israel to Nazi Germany and questioned the death toll from the Hamas-led attack on Israel. In January 2025, after a ceasefire agreement involving the release of Israeli hostages and Palestinian prisoners suspended the Gaza war, Olszewski said that he supported efforts to rebuild the Gaza Strip and help Palestinians displaced by the war.

In January 2025, Olszewski voted against a bill to place sanctions on the International Criminal Court for issuing arrest warrants against Benjamin Netanyahu and former Israeli Defense Minister Yoav Gallant. Following the vote, he signed onto a letter to the president of the ICC calling on the court to rescind its arrest warrants against Israeli leaders. He later told Jewish Insider that he could have voted for the bill if some improvements were made to it, but believed that the bill invoked "serious First Amendment concerns" and could require sanctions on American who have a constitutionally protected right to free speech as written.

During the Congressional summer recess of 2025, Olszewski attended an AIPAC-sponsored trip to Israel, during which he met with Netanyahu, Israeli President Isaac Herzog, and Palestinian prime minister Mohammad Mustafa. During his meeting with Netanyahu, he urged him to end the Gaza War to address the humanitarian crisis in Gaza, afterwards expressing frustration with Netanyahu's slowness in addressing the famine and by the lack of a clear timeline to end the war.

==== Syria ====
In May 2025, Olszewski supported President Donald Trump's decision to lift U.S. sanctions on Syria, saying that the country's new leadership offered a "chance to reset". In February 2026, he expressed concern with the Syrian government's changes to education curriculum, which included the removal of references to women, love, pre-Islamic culture, and human evolution.

==== Ukraine ====
Olszewski supports providing aid to Ukraine in the Russo-Ukrainian War, describing it as a matter of world security and arguing that withholding support for Ukraine and other democracies would encourage Vladimir Putin to invade other countries.

==== Venezuela ====
In December 2025, Olszewski criticized U.S. military strikes on alleged drug traffickers in the Caribbean Sea and expressed support for congressional investigations into the strikes, saying that stopping the drug trade "has to be done in accordance with the law". In January 2026, he condemned U.S. military strikes in Venezuela and the subsequent capture of Venezuelan president Nicolás Maduro, saying that the unauthorized strikes could present a risk to national security and calling for congressional oversight and a plan for the United States's involvement in Venezuela.

=== Gun control ===
In 2009, Olszewski voted against a bill that would prohibit accused domestic abusers from owning firearms, but for a bill that prohibited convicted domestic abusers from owning firearms. In 2013, he voted against a bill that would have banned assault weapons in Maryland. In 2014, the NRA Political Victory Fund gave Olszewski an "A" rating. Olszewski later called this vote a "mistake", saying that it was "a vote I've changed my mind on. I am focused on the future and the safety of our children." In November 2019, he proposed legislation that would require gun shops to install stronger security measures to protect firearms from burglaries. In March 2022, Olszewski testified in support of a bill that would require gun shops to implement minimum security requirements to prevent gun theft.

During his 2024 congressional campaign, Olszewski supported federal legislation to ban assault weapon sales. In February 2025, he introduced legislation that require federally licensed firearms dealers to secure weapons in their inventory and allow the United States Attorney General to prescribe additional security requirements.

=== Health care ===
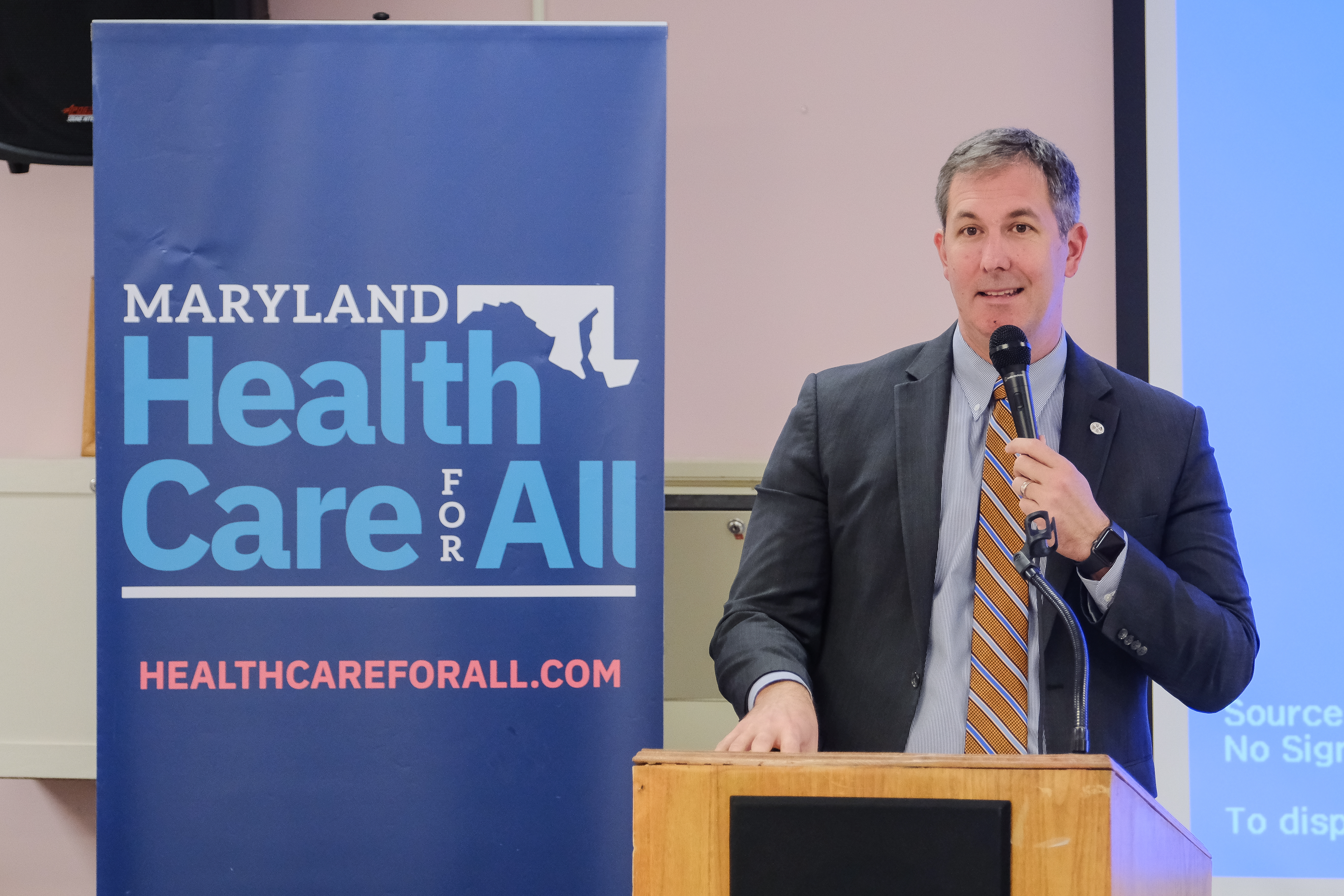
Olszewski speaks at a Maryland Health Care for All forum, 2023

In March 2019, Olszewski appeared in an ad to support a bill establishing the Prescription Drug Affordability Board, a state agency to negotiate prescription drug prices. During the 2021 legislative session, Olszewski urged the Maryland General Assembly to override Governor Larry Hogan's veto of a bill establishing a permanent funding source for the Prescription Drug Affordability Board.

In December 2022, Olszewski launched the Public Health Pathways program, in partnership with the Community College of Baltimore County and the University of Maryland St. Joseph Medical Center, to provide nursing students with scholarships and a guaranteed job at the St. Joseph Medical Center once they became certified nursing assistants. The program was funded using contributions from the University of Maryland Medical System and the American Rescue Plan Act of 2021, and was expanded in 2024 after it was found to help expand the medical center's talent pipeline and attract more diverse employees.

During his 2024 congressional campaign, Olszewski said that he would support "any effort to expand health care" that was "passable and workable in Congress". He also signed onto a Maryland Healthcare for All pledge to support legislation to extend Inflation Reduction Act-provided healthcare benefits beyond 2025.

=== Housing and development ===
In October 2018, Olszewski said he supported Baltimore County's agreement with the federal government to improve access to affordable housing, which would see the construction of 1,000 affordable housing units over 10 years. He also framed his support of the agreement as a fight against discrimination. During the 2019 legislative session, Olszewski said he supported a bill that would allow Baltimore County to impose impact fees onto developers to pay for roads and schools impacted by specific developments. Olszewski later signed a bill into law imposing impact fees onto developers starting July 2020. In 2023, he proposed a bill that would require landlords that rent out seven or more units to register their units with the county Department of Permits, Approvals and Inspections, which was unanimously passed by the Baltimore County Council in May 2023. In April 2023, Olszewski issued his first-ever veto to a bill that would allow specific kinds of buildings into catering halls, arguing that the bill would be considered unconstitutional under the Maryland Constitution because it would "give special treatment to a single party of select few". In December 2024, he signed an executive order requiring developers that receive financial support from the county to dedicate at least 20 percent of the units in their development to affordable housing.

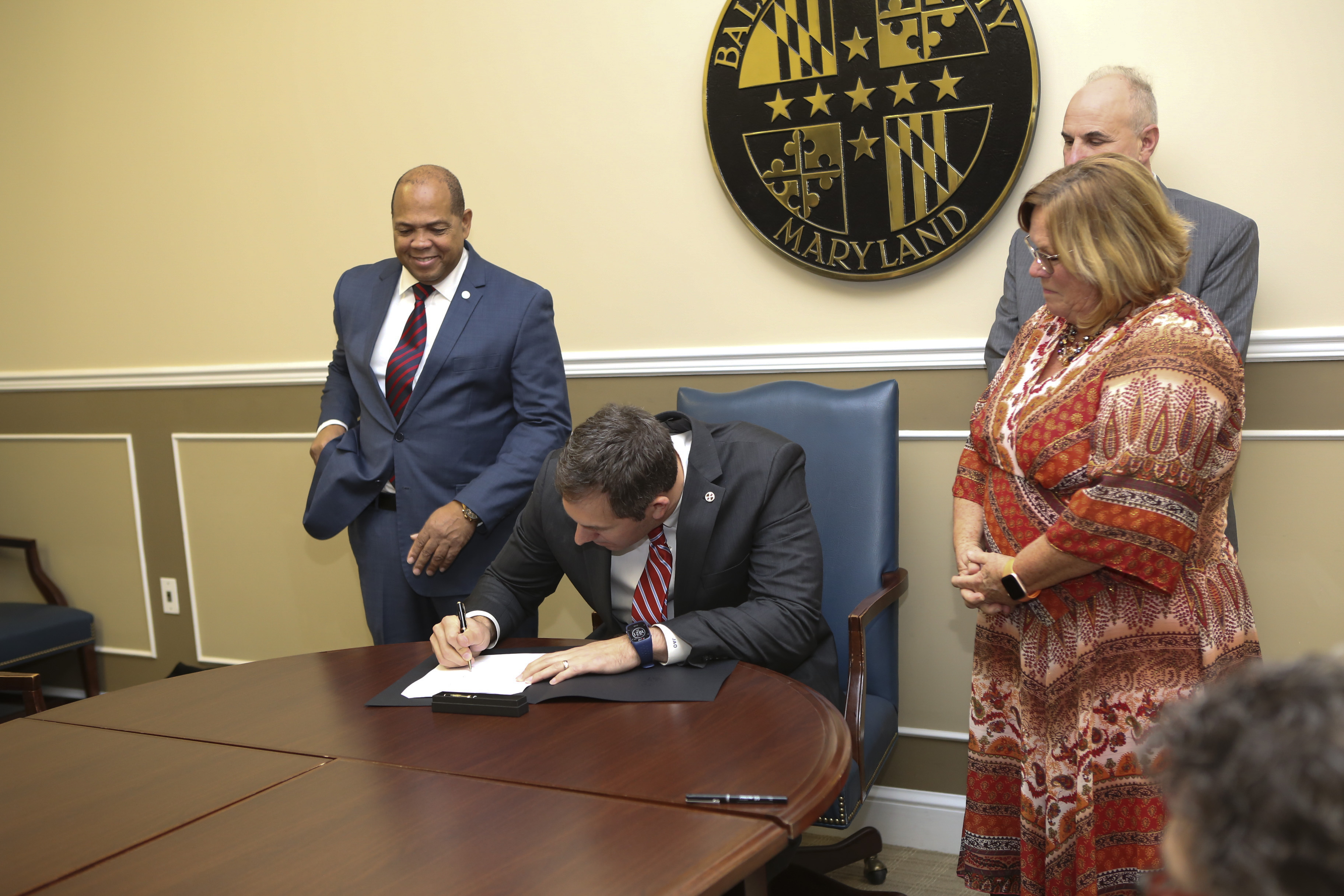
Olszewski signs the HOME Act into law, 2019

In October 2019, Olszewski introduced a bill to ban landlords from discriminating against potential tenants based on their source of income. The bill passed and was signed into law. During the 2020 legislative session, Olszewski testified in support of the Housing Opportunities Made Equal (HOME) Act, a bill that would make it illegal for landlords to discriminate against prospective renters based on their lawful source of income.

In April 2021, Olszewski proposed legislation to create the Baltimore County Department of Housing and Community Development, which passed and was signed into law by Olszewski in May. The newly created department inherited income-based rent relief programs from the county Department of Social Services, and homeowner and tenant relief efforts from the county Office of Housing. The department was also used to distribute rental assistance funds provided to the county by the American Rescue Plan Act of 2021.

From 2022 to 2023, Baltimore County acquired one-third of the property at Security Square Mall, seeking to renovate the declining mall into a community hub. In June 2023, Olszewski said he supported a proposal to create a redevelopment authority to oversee the acquisition and redevelopment of property near the mall, setting aside $500,000 in his budget to fund the authority's creation, and later signed a bill to create the authority in July.

In January 2024, Olszewski introduced a bill that would allow the county to approve mixed-use developments in manufacturing or business districts and areas near transit centers and major employers without the approval of the Baltimore County Council. The bill was withdrawn in February after Olszewski reached an agreement with county council chair Izzy Patoka to introduce a separate bill to promote mixed-use developments in certain zoning districts, which passed the county council in a 5–2 vote in April. In March 2024, he vetoed a bill to amend the county zoning code to allow for the development of around 300 apartments in Hunt Valley, which he considered to be a "special law" that would be unconstitutional under the Maryland Constitution; the Baltimore County Council voted 5–1 to override his veto. In June 2024, Olszewski vetoed a bill that would restrict development in areas with overcrowded schools, saying that it would violate the county charter as well as the county's voluntary federal agreement; the county council overrode Olszewski's veto in July 2024. In August 2024, Olszewski supported a clarifying bill passed by the Baltimore County Council in a 4–3 vote that would exclude affordable housing developments from the county's development restrictions.

In July 2025, after President Donald Trump said that he wanted the new Federal Bureau of Investigation headquarters to be the Ronald Reagan Building and International Trade Center in Washington, D.C., overturning a 2023 General Services Administration decision selecting Greenbelt, Maryland as the location for the FBI's new headquarters, Olszewski signed onto a letter saying that he and other Maryland lawmakers would "be fighting back against this proposal with every tool we have".

During the 119th Congress, Olszewski introduced the Revitalizing Empty Structures Into Desirable Environments (RESIDE) Act, which would create a competitive pilot program through the U.S. Department of Housing and Urban Development to distribute up to $10 million in grants to help redevelop vacant properties into affordable housing. The RESIDE Act was added to the 21st Century ROAD to Housing Act, which passed and became law without President Trump's signature.

=== Immigration ===
In November 2024, after former president Donald Trump won the 2024 United States presidential election, Olszewski signed an executive order establishing an immigrant affairs commission in Baltimore County. In January 2025, he voted against the Laken Riley Act, saying that the bill would "endanger harmless children and divert billions of dollars away from securing the border and efforts to target dangerous criminals". In December 2025, Olszewski voted against the Kayla Hamilton Act, which would require extensive background checks for unaccompanied immigrant children entering the country, saying that he would have instead supported a bill requiring the review of criminal records of applicants from their home country. In January 2026, he supported the impeachment of U.S. Homeland Security Secretary Kristi Noem following the killing of Alex Pretti. In February 2026, after footage from inside the Baltimore ICE detention facility went viral on social media, Olszewski signed onto a letter to Noem and ICE director Todd Lyons expressing concerns with conditions at the facility.

=== Social issues ===
Olszewski was seen as a key vote on the Civil Marriage Protection Act in 2011 and 2012. During the 2011 legislative session, Olszewski introduced an amendment to the Civil Marriage Protection Act that specified what religious programs could refuse providing services to same-sex couples. During the 2012 legislative session, Olszewski expressed concerns about the legislation, mainly on how it would impact churches, mosques, and synagogues whose members abhor same-sex marriages, and said that he sought protections beyond simply letting religious institutions bar same-sex marriage ceremonies. On February 16, 2012, Olszewski said he would vote for the Civil Marriage Protection Act, saying it would be a "disgrace" to go another year without giving Marylanders "equal protection". The bill passed the Maryland House of Delegates on February 18 by a vote of 72–67.

While in the House of Delegates, Olszewski received an overall approval rating of 30 percent from the Maryland Right to Life, which opposes abortion. When asked in 2010 if he identified as being pro-choice or pro-life, Olszewski said, "I believe that we must do all that we can do prevent unplanned pregnancies. Rather than focusing energies in an argument about 'pro life/pro choice' we should focus instead on eliminating the need for that choice in the first place." In 2014, he voted for a bill that would eliminate taxpayer funding of third-trimester abortions. In June 2022, Olszewski condemned the U.S. Supreme Court's ruling in Dobbs v. Jackson Women's Health Organization and later said that Baltimore County officials would not cooperate with attempts to prosecute people who cross state lines to receive an abortion. During his 2024 congressional campaign, Olszewski said he supported codifying Roe v. Wade on the federal level and held a fundraiser to support Question 1, a referendum to establish a right to reproductive freedom in the Constitution of Maryland. He has also expressed interest in working with congressional Republicans on a bill involving in vitro fertilisation.

Olszewski supports the TRUST in Congress Act, which would require members of Congress and their relatives to divest individual stocks or move their investments into a blind trust.

=== Transportation ===
Olszewski supports the revival of the Baltimore Red Line, calling Governor Larry Hogan's decision to kill the proposed transit line "short-sighted". In June 2023, he said he would support extending the Red Line to Sparrows Point, Maryland.

In September 2020, Olszewski signed a letter opposing proposals by the Maryland Transit Administration to dramatically cut bus and rail services in the Baltimore region in 2021 following a historic decline in ridership and revenues. Later that month, he praised the MTA's decision not to pursue cuts to Baltimore-area bus services. In September 2021, Olszewski accused the Maryland Department of Transportation of neglecting Baltimore County's needs and called for "more sustained support and partnership" from state budgeteers.

== Personal life ==
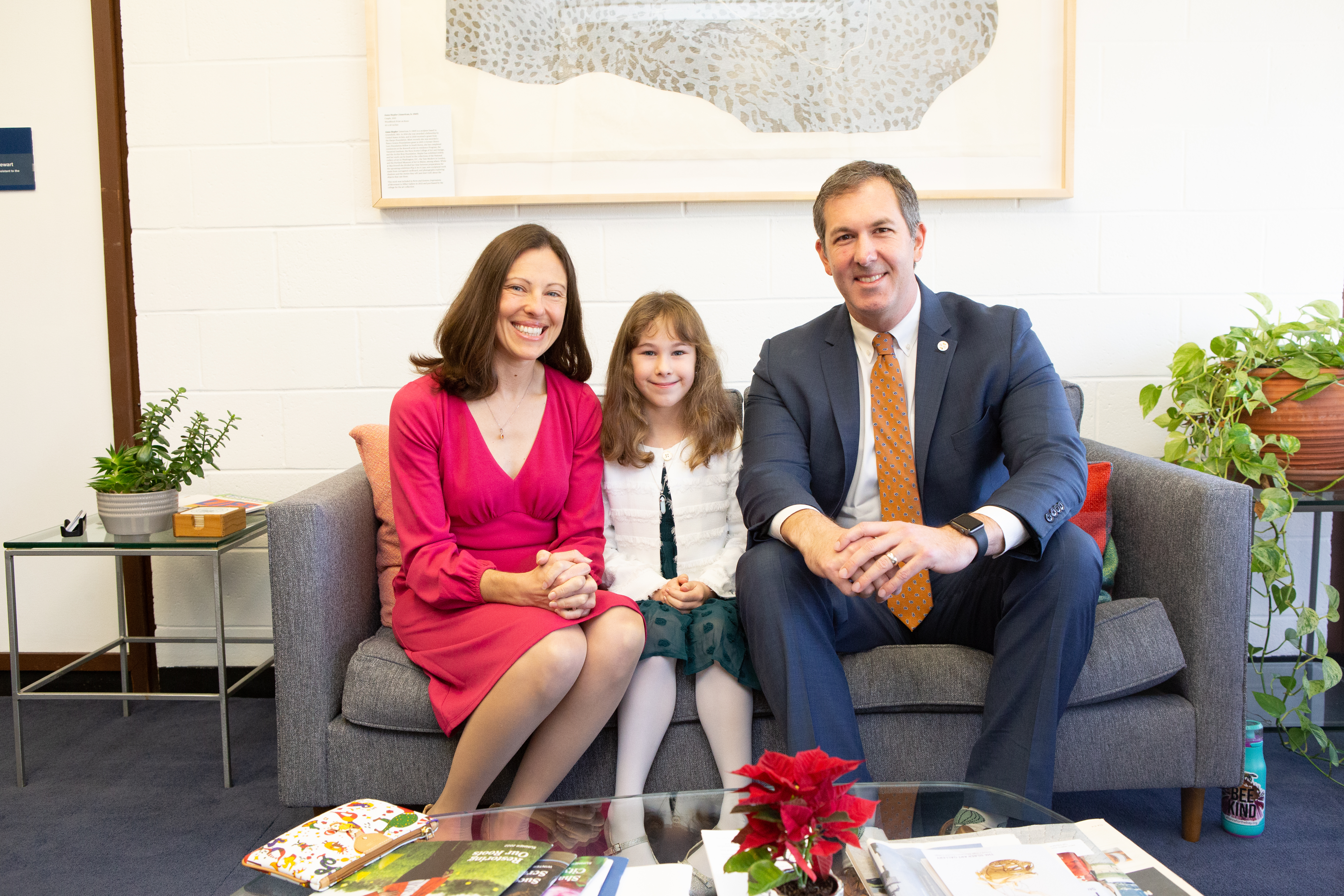
Olszewski and his family during his county executive inauguration, 2022

Olszewski met his future wife, Marisa Azzone, while attending Goucher College. They married in 2005. Marisa is the current environmental policy manager for the Maryland League of Conservation Voters. Together, they have a daughter and live in Sparrows Point, Maryland.

Olszewski is a Methodist and attends Lovely Lane United Methodist Church in Baltimore, Maryland. He is a fan of the Baltimore Orioles.

== Electoral history ==
2006 Maryland House of Delegates 6th district election
Primary election
Party	Candidate	Votes	%
Democratic	John Olszewski Jr. (incumbent)	6,893	22.3
Democratic	Joseph J. Minnick (incumbent)	5,518	17.8
Democratic	Michael H. Weir Jr. (incumbent)	5,167	16.7
Democratic	Jane Brooks	3,811	12.3
Democratic	Jake Mohorovic	3,627	11.7
Democratic	Ron Schaeffer	2,956	9.5
Democratic	Eric Washington	1,675	5.4
Democratic	Russ Mirabile	1,330	4.3
Total votes		30,977	100.0
General election
Democratic	John Olszewski Jr. (incumbent)	18,769	22.9
Democratic	Joseph J. Minnick (incumbent)	17,379	21.2
Democratic	Michael Weir Jr. (incumbent)	17,117	20.9
Republican	Steve Dishon	10,961	13.4
Republican	Ric Metzgar	8,915	10.9
Republican	Paul M. Blitz	8,765	10.7
Write-in		106	0.1
Total votes		82,012	100.0

2010 Maryland House of Delegates 6th district election
Primary election
Party	Candidate	Votes	%
Democratic	John Olszewski Jr. (incumbent)	6,301	23.3
Democratic	Michael Weir Jr. (incumbent)	5,016	18.6
Democratic	Joseph J. Minnick (incumbent)	4,856	18.0
Democratic	Todd Crandell	3,584	13.3
Democratic	Jake Mohorovic	2,616	9.7
Democratic	Don Mason	1,802	6.7
Democratic	Cassandra Brown Umoh	1,715	6.4
Democratic	Raymond J. Smith	1,111	4.1
Total votes		27,001	100.0
General election
Democratic	John Olszewski Jr. (incumbent)	16,278	20.2
Democratic	Michael Weir Jr. (incumbent)	14,618	18.2
Democratic	Joseph J. Minnick (incumbent)	14,405	17.9
Republican	Bob Long	12,999	16.2
Republican	Ric Metzgar	12,480	15.5
Republican	Carlton William Clendaniel	9,612	11.9
Write-in		79	0.1
Total votes		80,471	100.0

Male Delegates to the Democratic National Convention, District 2, 2012
Party	Candidate	Votes	%
Democratic	Duane "Tony" Baysmore (Obama)	24,695	25.4
Democratic	John Olszewski Jr. (Obama)	24,314	25.0
Democratic	Jerome Foster (Obama)	24,256	25.0
Democratic	Rick Martinez (Obama)	23,865	24.6
Total votes		97,130	100.0

2014 Maryland Senate 6th district election
Primary election
Party	Candidate	Votes	%
Democratic	John Olszewski Jr.	5,259	62.1
Democratic	Russ Mirabile	3,215	37.9
Total votes		8,474	100.0
General election
Republican	Johnny Ray Salling	14,916	47.7
Democratic	John Olszewski Jr.	14,065	44.9
Independent	Scott M. Collier	2,285	7.3
Write-in		26	0.1
Total votes		31,292	100.0

2018 Baltimore County Executive election
Primary election
Party	Candidate	Votes	%
Democratic	John Olszewski Jr.	27,820	32.88
Democratic	James Brochin	27,803	32.86
Democratic	Vicki Almond	26,842	31.73
Democratic	Kevin Francis Marron	2,136	2.52
Total votes		84,601	100.0
General election
Democratic	John Olszewski Jr.	186,693	57.8
Republican	Alfred W. Redmer Jr.	135,702	42.0
Write-in		448	0.1
Total votes		322,843	100.0

2022 Baltimore County Executive election
Primary election
Party	Candidate	Votes	%
Democratic	John Olszewski Jr. (incumbent)	80,607	86.4
Democratic	Adam Reuter	12,656	13.6
Total votes		93,263	100.0
General election
Democratic	John Olszewski Jr. (incumbent)	173,159	63.7
Republican	Pat McDonough	98,160	36.1
Write-in		613	0.2
Total votes		271,932	100.0

2024 Maryland's 2nd congressional district election
Primary election
Party	Candidate	Votes	%
Democratic	John Olszewski Jr.	65,994	78.7
Democratic	Harry Bhandari	7,148	8.5
Democratic	Sia Kyriakakos	4,079	4.9
Democratic	Sharron Reed-Burns	3,472	4.1
Democratic	Jessica Sjoberg	1,691	2.0
Democratic	Clint Spellman Jr.	1,466	1.8
Total votes		83,850	100.0
General election
Democratic	John Olszewski Jr.	223,797	58.2
Republican	Kimberly Klacik	152,079	39.5
Libertarian	Jasen Wunder	8,169	2.1
Write-in		749	0.2
Total votes		384,794	100.0

Political offices
Preceded by Don Mohler	Executive of Baltimore County; 2018–2025	Succeeded by D'Andrea Walker; Acting
U.S. House of Representatives
Preceded by Dutch Ruppersberger	Member of the U.S. House of Representatives from Maryland's 2nd congressional district 2025–present	Incumbent
U.S. order of precedence (ceremonial)
Preceded by Kelly Morrison	United States representatives by seniority 409th	Succeeded by Bob Onder
