= Aleta Margolis =

American educator

Aleta Margolis is an American educator, social entrepreneur, and Ashoka Fellow. She is the founder and president of Center for Inspired Teaching, a 501c3 nonprofit organization with the mission of "Creating radical change in the school experience – away from compliance and toward authentic engagement."

== Biography ==
Margolis grew up in Silver Spring, Maryland. Her parents were Lawrence S. Margolis, a judge of the United States Court of Claims in Washington, and Doris Margolis, who was president of Editorial Associates, a Washington research service. Doris Margolis was also president of the American Medical Writers Association mid-Atlantic region.

After graduating from Brown University in 1989, Margolis taught high school students in Washington, D.C.'s juvenile detention system, where she had good success in turning around students who had no interest in schooling when she started.

In 1991 she moved to Chicago, and earned a master's degree in education from Northwestern University in 1992 while teaching grade school in Skokie, Illinois. Then she taught middle school in the inner city, and found a lack of interest in education there similar to what she had seen in Washington, not just among the students but even among the teachers.

In 1995, Margolis founded Center for Inspired Teaching to train other teachers in her methods of reviving the educational process. She is on the board of directors of the Inspired Teaching Demonstration School in Washington.

== Awards and recognition ==
Margolis was named an Ashoka Fellow in 2001, in recognition of her work "revitalizing public education by unlocking the personal creativity of teachers and thereby dramatically improving student learning."

She was included in the Washingtonian 2006 List of Powerful Women to Watch, when Inspired Teaching had already trained over 5000 Washington-area teachers over 11 years.
