= Don Mohler =

American politician from Maryland

Donald I. Mohler, III
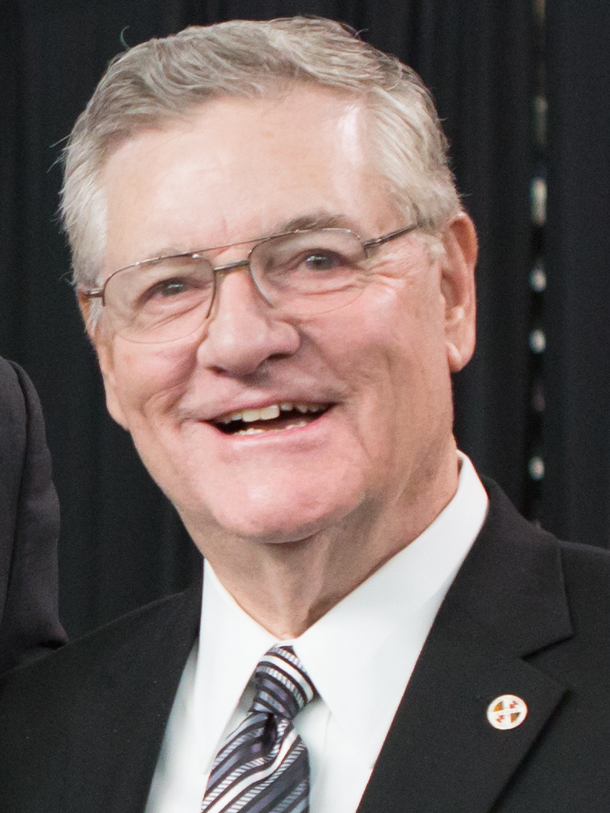

13th Executive of Baltimore County
- In office May 29, 2018 – December 3, 2018
- Preceded by: Fred Homan (Acting)
- Succeeded by: Johnny Olszewski

Personal details
- Party: Democratic
- Occupation: educator, school administrator

Donald Mohler is an American politician and former educator from Maryland and a member of the Democratic Party. He served as the 13th Baltimore County Executive.

== Career ==
Mohler attended Western Maryland College for his bachelor's and master's degrees, completing the latter in 1977, then received a master's of education from Loyola College the following year.

In 1971, he joined the social studies faculty of St. Mark's School in Catonsville. In 1972, he moved on to Lansdowne High School. He spent nearly 30 years as a teacher, guidance counselor and administrator in Baltimore County Public Schools. He earned his doctorate in education from Nova Southeastern University in 1999.

In 2004, he joined the office of County Executive James T. Smith Jr. as communications director and stayed on after the 2010 election as chief of staff to County Executive Kevin Kamenetz.

After Kamenetz's death in May 2018, the Baltimore County Council selected Mohler to serve out the final six months of his term.

After leaving public office, Mohler founded the consultancy Mohler Communication Strategies.
