= Victor J. Wolski =

American judge (born 1962)

Victor Wolski
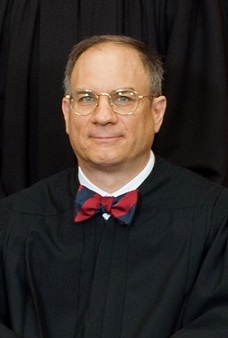
- Wolski in 2017

Senior Judge of the United States Court of Federal Claims
- Incumbent
- Assumed office July 13, 2018

Judge of the United States Court of Federal Claims
- In office July 14, 2003 – July 13, 2018
- Appointed by: George W. Bush
- Preceded by: Bohdan A. Futey
- Succeeded by: Thompson M. Dietz

Personal details
- Born: Victor John Wolski; November 14, 1962 (age 64) New Brunswick, New Jersey, U.S.
- Education: University of Pennsylvania (BA, BS); University of Virginia (JD)

Victor John Wolski (born November 14, 1962) is a senior judge of the United States Court of Federal Claims, appointed to that court in 2003 by President George W. Bush.

== Early life, education, and career ==
Born in New Brunswick, New Jersey to Vito and Eugenia Wolski, he was raised in Sayreville, New Jersey and graduated from Sayreville War Memorial High School in 1980. Wolski received a Bachelor of Arts in history and a Bachelor of Science in economics from the University of Pennsylvania in 1984, and thereafter served as research associate to a supply-side economist at the Center for Strategic and International Studies and at the Institute for Political Economy. In 1988, he served in the Reagan Administration as speech writer to Secretary of Agriculture Richard Lyng, and in 1989 he served in the administration of President George H. W. Bush, in the General Counsel's office at the U.S. Department of Energy. Wolski received his Juris Doctor from the University of Virginia School of Law in 1991, having served as president of the Federalist Society and as a member of the editorial board of the Virginia Tax Review. From 1991 to 1992, he served as law clerk to Judge Vaughn Walker on the United States District Court for the Northern District of California.

Wolski then became an attorney with the Pacific Legal Foundation until 1997, where he was counsel of record at the petition stage in Suitum v. Tahoe Regional Planning Agency, 520 U.S. 725 (1997). He was also general counsel to the Sacramento County Republican Central Committee from 1995 to 1997. From 1997 to 2000, Wolski served as tax counsel to Senator Connie Mack (R-FL), a member of the United States Senate Committee on Finance. He was General Counsel and Chief Tax Adviser to the Joint Economic Committee of the U.S. Congress in 1999 and 2000. From 2000 to 2003, Wolski was an attorney with the Washington, D.C. law firms Cooper, Carvin & Rosenthal and Cooper & Kirk.

=== Claims court service ===
On September 12, 2002, President George W. Bush nominated Wolski to a seat on the U.S. Court of Federal Claims. The nomination was not acted on by the U.S. Senate, but Wolski was renominated January 7, 2003, and confirmed by U.S. Senate on July 9, 2003. He received his commission on July 14, 2003. He assumed senior status on July 13, 2018.

== Personal life ==
Wolski married his wife, Lisa, on June 3, 2000, and they reside in Virginia.

Legal offices
Preceded by Bohdan A. Futey	Judge of the United States Court of Federal Claims; 2003–2018	Succeeded by Thompson M. Dietz
