= Francis Allegra =

American judge (1957–2015)

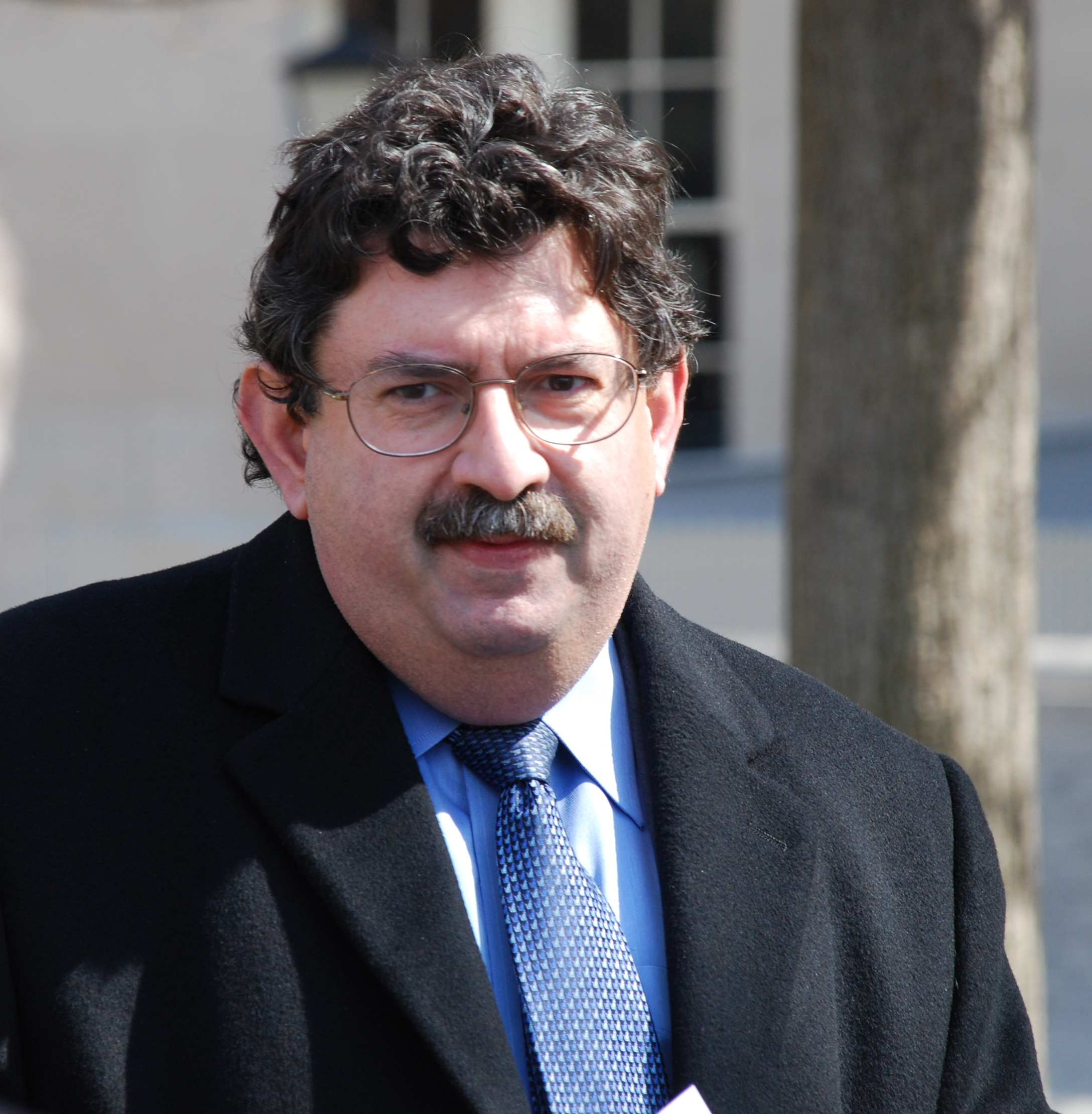

Senior Judge of the United States Court of Federal Claims
- In office October 23, 2013 – August 27, 2015

Judge of the United States Court of Federal Claims
- In office October 22, 1998 – October 22, 2013
- Appointed by: Bill Clinton
- Preceded by: Lawrence S. Margolis
- Succeeded by: Lydia Griggsby

Personal details
- Born: Francis Marion Allegra; October 14, 1957 Cleveland, Ohio, U.S.
- Died: August 27, 2015 (aged 57) Vienna, Virginia, U.S.
- Spouse: Regina Esposito (m. 1996)
- Children: 2

Francis Marion Allegra (October 14, 1957 – August 27, 2015) was an American lawyer who served as a judge on the United States Court of Federal Claims.

== Early life and education ==
Allegra grew up in Cleveland, Ohio, and graduated from St. Edward High School in Lakewood, Ohio. He graduated from Borromeo College of Ohio in 1978, with a degree in philosophy, and then, in 1981, received his Juris Doctor (magna cum laude) from the Cleveland-Marshall Law School at Cleveland State University. Following graduation, he served as a law clerk to Chief Trial Judge Philip R. Miller of the U.S. Court of Claims from 1981 to 1982.

== Professional career ==
From 1982 to 1984, Allegra was an associate at the Cleveland law firm of Squire, Sanders, and Dempsey, where he specialized in tax and bond work. In 1984, he joined the Appellate Section of the Tax Division of the U.S. Department of Justice. From 1984 through 1994, he was an appellate litigator, handling many of the Tax Division's most complex cases in Federal courts of appeals throughout the country. During this period, Allegra steadily rose through the ranks of the Tax Division, becoming first a special assistant to the assistant attorney general of the Tax Division and then counselor to the assistant attorney general of the Tax Division.

In 1994, Allegra was appointed counselor to the associate attorney general (the third-highest-ranking official at the Justice Department). Shortly after that, he was appointed deputy associate attorney general. In the latter role, Allegra worked with the Tax and Antitrust Divisions, as well as with the National Economic and Domestic Policy Councils at the White House.

=== Claims court service ===
On October 22, 1998, at the age of forty-one, Allegra was appointed by President Bill Clinton to be a judge on the United States Court of Federal Claims. Over his judicial career, he has issued more than 250 published opinions, on topics including tax, government contracts, intellectual property, takings, and military and civilian employment. From 2003 through 2010, Allegra was a member of the Information Technology Committee of the Judicial Conference of the United States. Allegra assumed senior status on October 22, 2013.

Allegra was an adjunct professor at the Georgetown University Law Center, where he taught Litigation with the Federal Government and a seminar on sovereign immunity. In 2012, Georgetown awarded him the Charles Fahy Distinguished Adjunct Professor Award, which is given annually to an adjunct professor who has made an extraordinary contribution to the Law Center. Allegra was also a frequent lecturer at Federal Judicial Center programs and other programs involving intellectual property, tax, government contracts and the use of technology in judging. He was considered an expert on issues involving electronic discovery.

== Personal life ==
Allegra married Regina Esposito in 1996. The couple had two sons. He was an avid mineral collector, who wrote a column—Legal Nuggets—for the Mineralogical Record. He was also active in Italian-American affairs, particularly with the Sons of Italy. He was a former President of the Sons of Italy International Lodge #2522. He was a co-founder of the Friends of Charles Bonaparte.

Allegra died on August 27, 2015, aged 57, of brain cancer at his home in Vienna, Virginia

Legal offices
Preceded by Lawrence S. Margolis	Judge of the United States Court of Federal Claims; 1998–2013	Succeeded by Lydia Griggsby
