= Center for Inspired Teaching =

Nonprofit organization based in Washington

Center for Inspired Teaching (or simply Inspired Teaching) is a 501(c)(3) nonprofit organization based in Washington, D.C.

Inspired Teaching offers professional development for pre-K-12 teachers via improvisational theater-based instruction. Inspired Teaching "seeks to transform the school experience for students from compliance-based to engagement-based."

== History ==
Aleta Margolis founded Center for Artistry in Teaching in 1995, which changed its name to Center for Inspired Teaching in 2004. The organization was officially incorporated as a 501(c)(3) nonprofit in 1996. Margolis began the organization after working as a public school teacher and professor of education at American University, and as a teacher for court-involved youth.

Inspired Teaching began offering professional development workshops for teachers in 1996.

In 2009, Inspired Teaching became the first Washington, DC nonprofit organization authorized to license teachers through the Inspired Teaching Certification Program, in partnership with AmeriCorps. Beginning in 2013, Inspired Teaching partnered with Trinity Washington University to offer Inspired Teaching Fellows a Master of Arts in Teaching while earning their teaching licenses.

In 2010, Inspired Teaching was awarded $1.29M from the Bill & Melinda Gates Foundation to implement student-centered literacy programming in Washington, D.C.

In 2011, Inspired Teaching entered into a two-year partnership with the Baltimore City Public Schools to train the system’s middle school math teachers in the Inspired Teaching Approach as part of BCPS’ initiative to implement the Common Core State Standards.

In 2012, Inspired Teaching entered into a multi-year partnership with the District of Columbia Public Schools as part of DCPS’ initiative to implement the Common Core State Standards.

In 2014, Inspired Teaching’s program, Creative Classrooms Through Empowered Teachers, was named one of 10 Re-Imagine Learning Champions by the LEGO Foundation and Ashoka Changemakers.

In 2014, Inspired Teaching’s high school history program, Real World History, won an LRNG Challenge grant from the National Writing Project, MacArthur Foundation, and John Legend’s Show Me Campaign. Real World History teaches DC-area students about the Great Migration, connecting them with local residents who experienced the event first-hand. Real World History students record oral histories for inclusion in the DC Public Library’s DIG DC collection and complete internships at DC-area cultural institutions.

In 2015, Inspired Teaching partnered with National Center for Teacher Residencies as a Transformation Center Provider through a grant from the Bill and Melinda Gates Foundation.

Aleta Margolis was featured on Comcast Newsmakers in April 2021. Inspired Teaching leadership is also frequently quoted in the Washington Post.

In 2022, Center for Inspired Teaching’s digital resource, Hooray For Monday, won silver at the inaugural Anthem Awards, the Webby Awards' social-impact recognition program. The organization’s Instigator of Thought Challenge was awarded bronze at the 2023 Anthem Awards.

The May 2023 issue of Kappan magazine, a publication from Phi Delta Kappa, includes an article on professional development for teachers written by Aleta Margolis.
