= Philip Hadji =

American judge (born 1981)

Phil Hadji
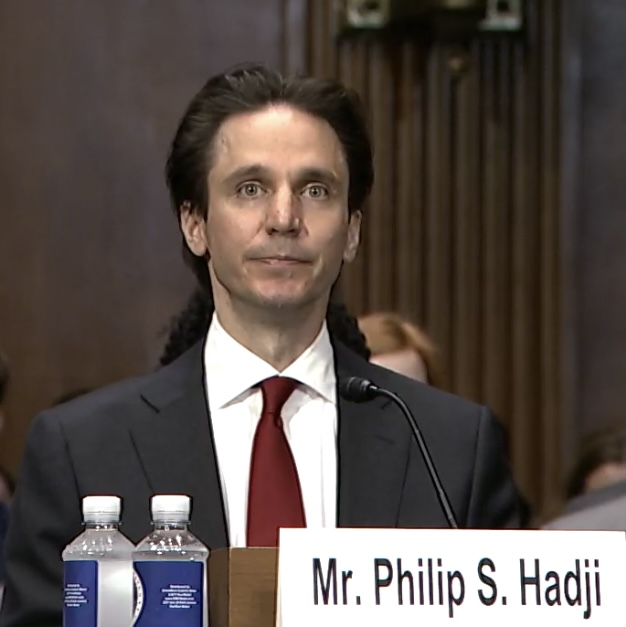

Judge of the United States Court of Federal Claims
- Incumbent
- Assumed office September 28, 2023
- Appointed by: Joe Biden
- Preceded by: Lydia Griggsby

Personal details
- Born: Philip Andrew Serge Hadji; 1981 (age 43–44); Cleveland, Ohio, U.S.
- Education: Hamilton College (AB); Case Western Reserve University (JD); George Washington University (LLM)

Philip Andrew Serge Hadji (born 1981) is an American lawyer who is serving as a judge of the United States Court of Federal Claims.

== Early life and education ==
Hadji was born in 1981 in Cleveland, Ohio. He earned a Bachelor of Arts from Hamilton College in 2004, a Juris Doctor from the Case Western Reserve University School of Law in 2009, and a Master of Laws from the George Washington University Law School in 2011. In law school, he served as the editor-in-chief of the Case Western Reserve Journal of International Law.

== Career ==
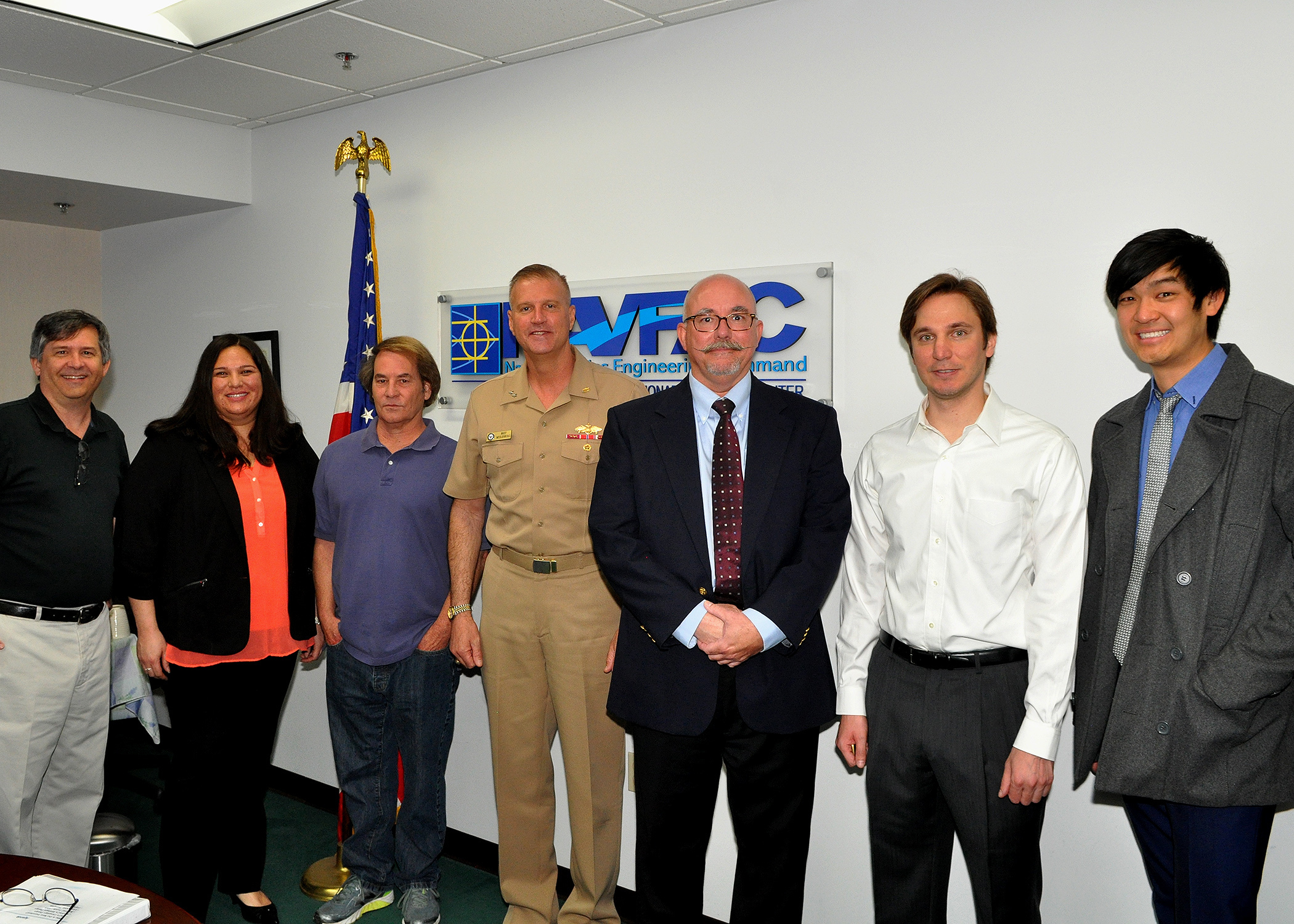
Hadji and colleagues at the NAVFAC in 2016.

Hadji served as a civilian attorney with the Office of the General Counsel at the Department of the Navy from 2011 to 2023. From 2011 to 2016, Hadji served as assistant counsel at the Naval Facilities Engineering Systems Command (NAVFAC). From 2016 to 2020, he served as assistant counsel and division director of the Acquisition Integrity Office. From 2020 to 2022, he served as the Deputy Counsel in the District of Columbia Office of the Naval Information Warfare Systems Command. From October 2022 to September 2023, he served as a senior trial attorney in the Naval Litigation Office.

=== Claims court service ===
On June 7, 2023, President Joe Biden announced his intent to nominate Hadji to serve as a judge of the United States Court of Federal Claims. On June 8, 2023, his nomination was sent to the Senate. President Biden nominated Hadji to the seat vacated by Judge Lydia Griggsby, who was elevated to the United States District Court for the District of Maryland on July 23, 2021. On July 12, 2023, a hearing on his nomination was held before the Senate Judiciary Committee. On September 14, 2023, his nomination was reported out of the committee by a 17–4 vote. On September 21, 2023, the United States Senate confirmed Hadji by a voice vote. He received his judicial commission on September 28, 2023. He took the oath of office on the same day.

== Selected publications ==
- The Case for Kurdish Statehood in Iraq (2009)
- Death Benefits for Servicemembers: A Case Study on the Department of Veterans Affairs and its Life Insurance Contract (2012)

Legal offices
Preceded by Lydia Griggsby	Judge of the United States Court of Federal Claims; 2023–present	Incumbent
