= Thompson M. Dietz =

American judge (born 1979)

Thompson Dietz
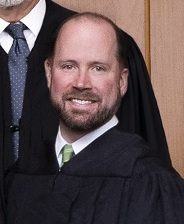
- Dietz in 2022

Judge of the United States Court of Federal Claims
- Incumbent
- Assumed office December 22, 2020
- Appointed by: Donald Trump
- Preceded by: Victor J. Wolski

Personal details
- Born: Thompson Michael Dietz; 1979 (age 45–46); New Orleans, Louisiana, U.S.
- Education: Clemson University (BA); Tulane University (JD)

Thompson Michael Dietz (born 1979) is a judge of the United States Court of Federal Claims.

== Education ==
Dietz earned his Bachelor of Arts from Clemson University and his Juris Doctor from the Tulane University Law School.

== Career ==
Dietz previously worked at General Dynamics Land Systems, where he was involved in negotiating and managing federal government contracts relating to military system design and development programs. From 2012 to 2020, he was Associate Counsel in the General Counsel's office at CohnReznick in Roseland, New Jersey, where his practice focused on government and commercial contracts and regulatory and corporate compliance. He also served as Lead Counsel for the firm's Government and Public Sector Group and for data security and privacy matters.

=== Claims court service ===
On June 15, 2020, President Donald Trump announced his intent to nominate Dietz to serve as a judge of the United States Court of Federal Claims. On July 2, 2020, his nomination was sent to the Senate. President Trump nominated Dietz to the seat vacated by Judge Victor J. Wolski, who assumed senior status on July 13, 2018. On September 9, 2020, a hearing on his nomination was held before the Senate Judiciary Committee. On October 22, 2020, the Judiciary Committee reported his nomination by a 12–0 vote. On December 19, 2020, the United States Senate invoked cloture on his nomination by a 50–37 vote. His nomination was confirmed later that day by a 51–36 vote. He received his judicial commission on December 22, 2020. He was sworn in on December 29, 2020.

Legal offices
Preceded by Victor J. Wolski	Judge of the United States Court of Federal Claims; 2020–present	Incumbent
