= Bohdan A. Futey =

Polish–American judge (born 1939)

Bohdan Futey
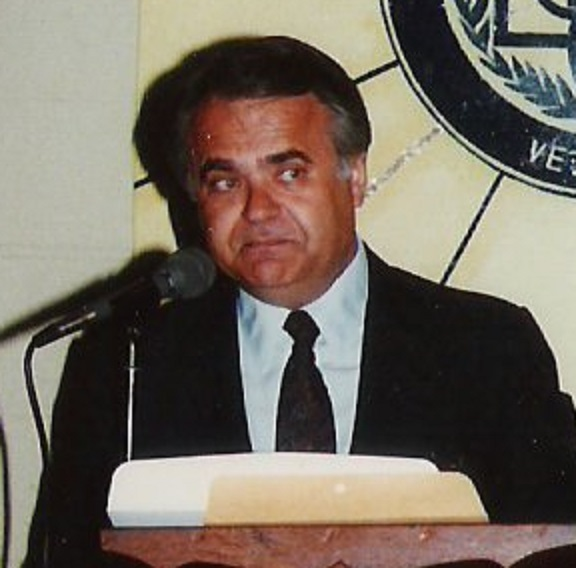
- Futey at the 41st Annual Ukrainian American Veterans National Convention in Philadelphia, 1988

Senior Judge of the United States Court of Federal Claims
- Incumbent
- Assumed office May 6, 2002

Judge of the United States Court of Federal Claims
- In office May 7, 1987 – May 6, 2002
- Appointed by: Ronald Reagan
- Preceded by: Philip R. Miller
- Succeeded by: Victor J. Wolski

Personal details
- Born: Bohdan Andrew Futey; June 28, 1939 (age 86); Buczacz, Poland (now Buchach, Ukraine)
- Education: Case Western Reserve University (BA, MA); Cleveland State University (JD)

Bohdan Andrew Futey (Ukrainian: Богда́н Петрович Футе́й; born June 28, 1939) is a senior judge of the United States Court of Federal Claims.

== Early life, education, and career ==
Futey was born to parents Petro and Maria Futey in 1939 in Buczacz, Poland (now Buchach, Ukraine). In 1943, his family moved to refugee camps in Germany and later immigrated to Argentina, where Futey graduated from high school. In 1957, his family moved to the United States. He became a naturalized U.S. citizen in 1962.

He received a Bachelor of Arts from Western Reserve University (now Case Western Reserve University in 1962. He was a teacher at Glenville High School in Cleveland, Ohio from 1962 to 1966, receiving a Master of Arts from Western Reserve University in 1964. He received his Juris Doctor at Cleveland–Marshall College of Law in 1968, and thereafter entered private practice in Parma, Ohio until 1972, as a founding partner in the law firm of Futey & Rakowsky.

He was then the chief assistant police prosecutor of Cleveland from 1972 to 1974. In 1974, Futey also unsuccessfully ran for Congress as an independent, garnering 1.7% of the vote. He was executive assistant to Cleveland Mayor Ralph J. Perk from 1974 to 1975, when he returned to private practice until 1984, as a partner in the law firm of Bazarko, Futey and Oryshkewych. He was Chairman of the Foreign Claims Settlement Commission of the United States from May 1984 until his appointment to the federal bench in 1987.

Futey has lectured on Constitutional Law at the Ukrainian Free University in Munich, at the University of Passau in Germany, and at National University of Kyiv-Mohyla Academy and Lviv University in Ukraine. He is a member of the District of Columbia Bar Association and the Ukrainian American Bar Association. He is admitted to practice in the State of Ohio, the U.S. District Court of Northern Ohio, and the District of Columbia.

=== Claims court service ===
On either January 30, 1987, or February 2, 1987, Futey was nominated by President Ronald Reagan to a seat on the United States Claims Court vacated by Philip R. Miller. Futey was confirmed by the United States Senate on May 7, 1987, and received his commission on May 7, 1987. He assumed senior status on May 6, 2002.

== Personal life and other activities ==
Futey married Ukrainian American Myroslava "Myra" Fur, with whom he has three children.

Futey is actively involved with Democratization and Rule of Law programs organized by the Judicial Conference of the United States, the United States Department of State, and the American Bar Association in Ukraine and Russia. He has participated in judicial exchange programs, seminars, and workshops and has been a consultant to the working group on Ukraine's Constitution and Ukrainian Parliament. Futey is an advisor to the International Foundation for Electoral Systems (IFES).

Futey is fluent in Ukrainian and has visited regularly. He was in Ukraine when the pro-European Union protests began in November 2013.

== Awards ==
- Order of Merit 1st Class of Ukraine (January 22, 2022).
- Order of Merit 2nd Class of Ukraine (December 3, 1999).

Legal offices
Preceded by Philip R. Miller	Judge of the United States Court of Federal Claims; 1987–2002	Succeeded by Victor J. Wolski
