= Philip R. Miller =

American judge (1918–1989)

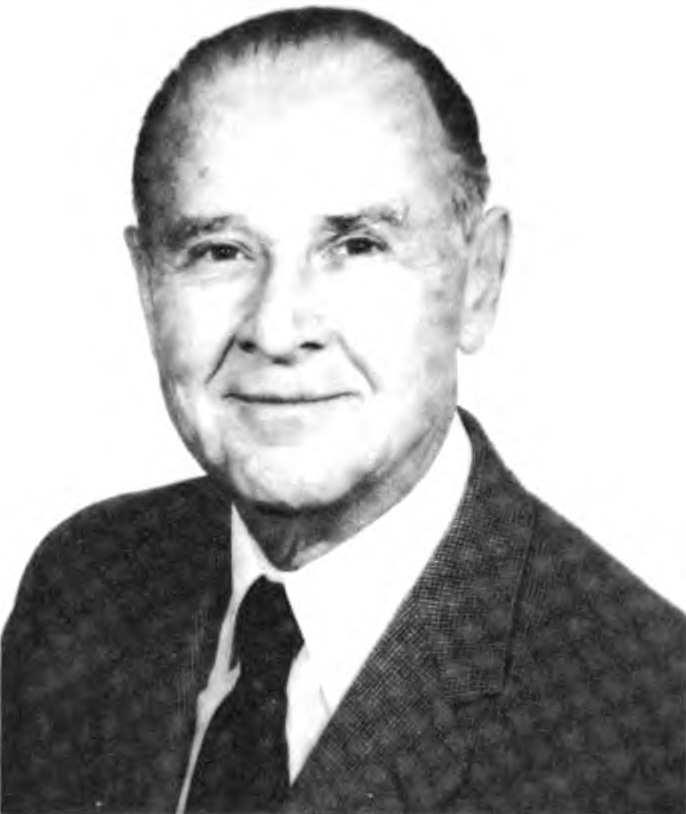

Senior Judge of the United States Court of Federal Claims
- In office November 30, 1986 – July 27, 1989

Judge of the United States Court of Federal Claims
- In office October 1, 1982 – November 30, 1986
- Appointed by: operation of law
- Preceded by: seat established
- Succeeded by: Bohdan A. Futey

Personal details
- Born: March 12, 1918 New York City, U.S.
- Died: July 27, 1989 (aged 71)
- Education: City College of New York (BBA); Columbia University (JD)

Philip R. Miller (March 12, 1918 – July 27, 1989) was a judge of the United States Court of Federal Claims from 1982 to 1986.

Born in New York, New York, Miller received a Bachelor of Business Administration from City College of New York in 1937, and a Bachelor of Laws from Columbia Law School in 1940. He entered private practice in Washington, D.C. in 1941, and then joined the United States Department of Justice, first as an attorney in the Criminal Division from 1942 to 1945, and then as an attorney in the Tax Division from 1946 to 1972, except for a brief return to private practice in 1951 and 1952. He was chief of the Court of Claims Section of the Tax Division from 1967 to 1972.

In 1972, he became a trial judge of the U.S. Court of Claims, serving as Chief of the Trial Division from 1980 to 1982. During this time, one of his law clerks was Francis Allegra. On October 1, 1982, he was elevated by operation of law to a new seat on the United States Court of Federal Claims authorized by 96 Stat. 27. He assumed senior status on November 30, 1986, and continued to serve in this capacity until his death.
