= Lawrence S. Margolis =

American judge (1935–2017)

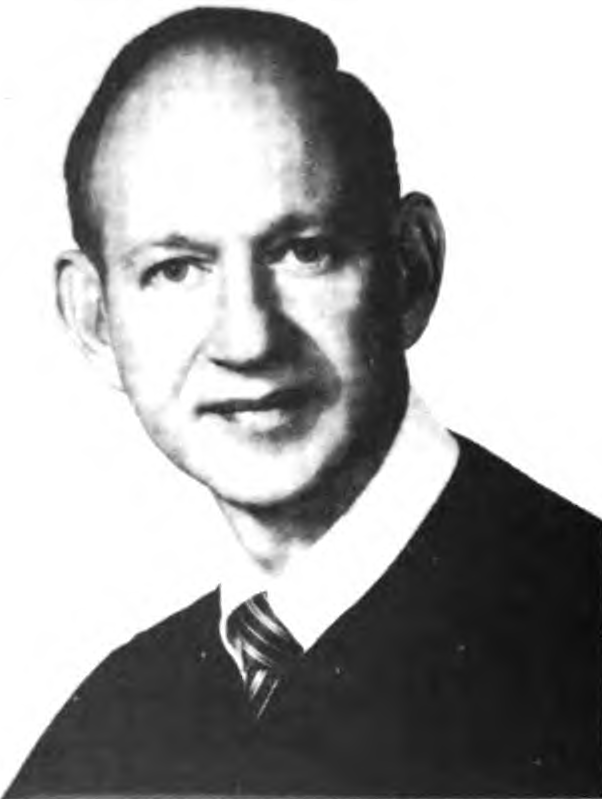

Senior Judge of the United States Court of Federal Claims
- In office December 14, 1997 – January 18, 2017

Judge of the United States Court of Federal Claims
- In office December 10, 1982 – December 14, 1997
- Appointed by: Ronald Reagan
- Preceded by: seat established
- Succeeded by: Francis Allegra

Personal details
- Born: March 13, 1935 Philadelphia, Pennsylvania, U.S.
- Died: January 18, 2017 (aged 81)
- Education: Drexel University (BS); George Washington University (JD)

Lawrence S. Margolis (March 13, 1935 – January 18, 2017) was a judge of the United States Court of Federal Claims from 1982 to 1997.

== Life and career ==
Born in Philadelphia, to Reuben and Mollie Margolis, Margolis received a Bachelor of Arts from Central High School in Philadelphia, followed by a Bachelor of Science in mechanical engineering from the Drexel Institute of Technology (now Drexel University) in 1957; and a Juris Doctor from George Washington University Law School in 1961. After being admitted to the District of Columbia Bar, he was a patent examiner for the United States Patent Office from 1957 to 1962, and was then patent counsel to the Naval Ordnance Laboratory in White Oak, Maryland until 1963, and then assistant corporation counsel for the District of Columbia from 1963 to 1966. While serving in the latter position, he also maintained a private legal practice in Silver Spring, Maryland. He joined the United States Department of Justice as a trial attorney in the Criminal Division and special assistant United States attorney for District of Columbia from 1966 to 1968, also serving as a consultant to the President's National Crime Commission from 1966 to 1967.

He was an assistant United States attorney for the District of Columbia from 1968 to 1971, at which time he was appointed to an eight-year term as a United States magistrate judge for the District of Columbia in 1971. He was reappointed for a second 8-year term in 1979 and served until December 1982. On September 27, 1982, Margolis was nominated by President Ronald Reagan to a new seat on the United States Claims Court authorized by 96 Stat. 27. He was confirmed by the United States Senate on December 10, 1982, he received his commission the same day, and took his oath of office on December 15, 1982. He assumed senior status on December 14, 1997.

Margolis married Doris May Rosenberg on January 30, 1960, with whom he had two children, Mary Aleta and Paul Oliver. Margolis died on January 18, 2017 at the age of 81.
