= Old Catonsville High School =

- U.S. National Register of Historic Places
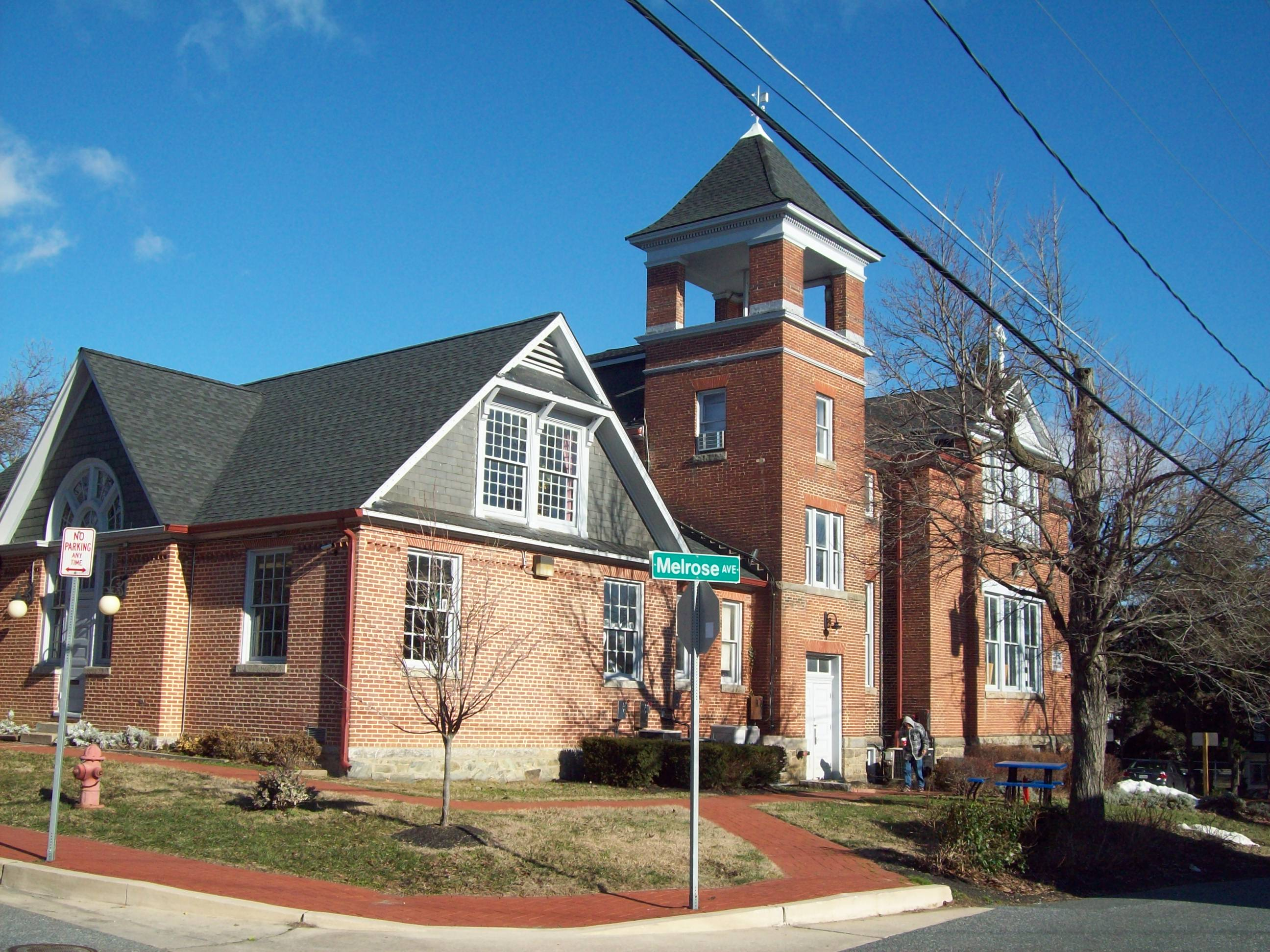
- Old Catonsville High School, December 2009

- Location within Maryland Location within the United States
- Location: 20 Winters Ln., Catonsville, Maryland
- Coordinates: 39°16′22″N 76°44′10″W
- Area: 0.5 acres (0.20 ha)
- Built: 1878
- Architect: Davis, Henry R.
- NRHP reference No.: 87001568
- Added to NRHP: September 10, 1987

Old Catonsville High School, also known as St. Mark's School, is a historic school building located at Catonsville, Baltimore County, Maryland. It is a masonry schoolhouse which consists of a one-story, single bay structure (built in 1878) and a three-story, four bay addition (built in 1898). In 1885 the school was designated a high school and in 1910 the property was sold to the Catholic Church.

It was listed on the National Register of Historic Places in 1987.
