= Lydia Griggsby =

American judge (born 1968)

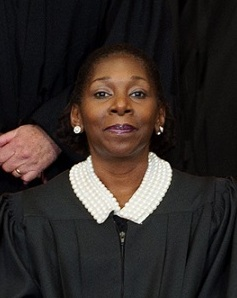
- Griggsby in 2017

Judge of the United States District Court for the District of Maryland
- Incumbent
- Assumed office July 20, 2021
- Appointed by: Joe Biden
- Preceded by: Catherine C. Blake

Judge of the United States Court of Federal Claims
- In office December 5, 2014 – July 23, 2021
- Appointed by: Barack Obama
- Preceded by: Francis Allegra
- Succeeded by: Philip Hadji

Personal details
- Born: Lydia Kay Griggsby; January 16, 1968 (age 58) Baltimore, Maryland, U.S.
- Education: University of Pennsylvania (BA); Georgetown University (JD)

Lydia Kay Griggsby (born January 16, 1968) is a United States district judge of the United States District Court for the District of Maryland. She is a former judge of the United States Court of Federal Claims and chief counsel for privacy and information policy for the Senate Judiciary Committee. She is the first woman of color to serve as a judge on the United States District Court for the District of Maryland.

== Early life and education ==
Griggsby was born and raised in Baltimore, Maryland, and attended the Park School of Baltimore in Baltimore, Maryland. Her parents were both educators who graduated from Historically Black Colleges and Universities (HBCUs). She received a Bachelor of Arts degree from the University of Pennsylvania in 1990 and a Juris Doctor from the Georgetown University Law Center in 1993. She is also a member of Delta Sigma Theta sorority.

== Career ==
Griggsby began her legal career as an associate with the law firm of DLA Piper LLP, from 1993 to 1995. She served as a trial attorney in the Commercial Litigation Branch of the Civil Division of the United States Department of Justice, from 1995 to 1998. She served as an Assistant United States Attorney in the District of Columbia, from 1998 to 2004. She worked as Counsel for the United States Senate Select Committee on Ethics, from 2004 to 2005. She served as Privacy Counsel for the United States Senate Committee on the Judiciary from 2004 to 2008, and as Chief Counsel for Privacy and Information Policy for senator Patrick Leahy on the same committee until 2014.

=== Assistant U.S. Attorney service ===
Griggsby served as a trial attorney in the Commercial Litigation Branch of the Civil Division of the United States Department of Justice from 1995 to 1998. She then served as an Assistant United States Attorney in the District of Columbia from 1998 to 2004. Notably, she represented the United States in a Clean Air Act enforcement action against Toyota for violations involving more than two million vehicles sold between 1996 and 1998, helping to secure a settlement that required the company to spend $20 million on cleaner vehicle projects, strengthen emissions compliance, and pay a $500,000 civil penalty.

After her service as a federal prosecutor, Griggsby worked as Counsel for the United States Senate Select Committee on Ethics from 2004 to 2005. She then served as Privacy Counsel for the United States Senate Committee on the Judiciary from 2004 to 2008, and as Chief Counsel for Privacy and Information Policy for Senator Patrick Leahy on the same committee until 2014. In that capacity, she was the lead Senate counsel on several pieces of legislation enacted by Congress to reform the Freedom of Information Act, including the OPEN Government Act of 2007 and the OPEN FOIA Act of 2009, as well as on legislation amending the Video Privacy Protection Act.

=== Federal judicial service ===
On April 10, 2014, President Barack Obama nominated Griggsby to serve as a Judge of the United States Court of Federal Claims, to the seat vacated by Judge Francis Allegra, whose term expired October 21, 2013. A hearing on her nomination before the United States Senate Judiciary Committee was held on June 4, 2014. On June 12, 2014, her nomination was reported out of committee by voice vote. On December 3, 2014, Senate Majority Leader Harry Reid filed for cloture on her nomination.

On December 4, 2014, the Senate invoked cloture on Griggsby's nomination by a 53–36 vote. Later that day, her nomination was confirmed by a voice vote. She received her commission on December 5, 2014. She took the oath of office on December 15, 2014. Her service on the claims court terminated on July 23, 2021, when she was sworn in as an Article III district court judge.

On March 30, 2021, President Joe Biden announced his intent to nominate Griggsby to serve as a United States district judge for the United States District Court for the District of Maryland. On April 19, 2021, her nomination was sent to the Senate. President Biden nominated Griggsby to the seat vacated by Judge Catherine C. Blake, who assumed senior status on April 2, 2021. On May 12, 2021, a hearing on her nomination was held before the Senate Judiciary Committee. On June 10, 2021, her nomination was reported out of committee by a 16–6 vote. On June 16, 2021, the United States Senate invoked cloture on her nomination by a 57–41 vote. Her nomination was confirmed later that day by a 59–39 vote. She received her judicial commission on July 20, 2021. She was sworn in on July 23, 2021.

=== Notable cases ===
Griggsby has presided over several notable cases. In 2022, Judge Griggsby intervened in NAACP v. Baltimore County when she granted a preliminary injunction blocking the Baltimore County Council's redistricting plan, finding it likely violated the Voting Rights Act by diluting Black voters' electoral power. She ordered the county to submit a remedial map, and later accepted a revised plan that included one majority-Black district.

In 2023, she oversaw the criminal trial of former Baltimore City State's Attorney Marilyn Mosby (Maryland v. Mosby), who was charged with perjury and making false statements on mortgage applications. A jury found Mosby guilty on both counts of perjury related to withdrawals from her city retirement account, and later on two counts of making false mortgage applications in connection with vacation homes in Florida. Griggsby sentenced Mosby to twelve months of home confinement followed by supervised release.

In 2025, Griggsby presided over GLMA v. NIH, a lawsuit filed by Lambda Legal on behalf of LGBTQ+ health researchers and advocacy groups after the Department of Health and Human Services revoked existing National Institutes of Health grants and blocked new applications for review. The plaintiffs alleged that the policy unlawfully targeted LGBTQ+-related programs. Griggsby granted a preliminary injunction, finding that the administration's actions constituted unlawful discrimination in violation of the Fifth Amendment and Section 1557 of the Affordable Care Act, and ordered that funding be restored while the case proceeded.

In 2026, Griggsby presided over United States v. Tom Goldstein, a former United States Supreme Court advocate accused of tax fraud.

== Abusive workplace ==
On February 10, 2026, NPR published an article about a December 17, 2025, United States Court of Appeals for the Fourth Circuit order where Griggsby acknowledged her chambers had "resulted in an abusive workplace" following a complaint by a former law clerk who alleged bullying, harsh verbal criticism, inadequate guidance, and intimidating behavior during the clerkship resulting in their resignation and transfer along with their co-clerk. The order, signed by Chief Judge Albert Diaz, concluded that after an investigation—which involved meeting with former clerks—clerk's feared asking questions, were subjected to intense questioning about large caseloads, and experienced stress-related health effects. Griggsby disputed some specific allegations while acknowledging that aspects of her management style had created an abusive environment and expressing regret for the impact on staff. As corrective action, the order stated that she agreed to undertake workplace-focused training and mentorship, meet regularly with the circuit's Director of Workplace Relations, and encourage future clerks to raise concerns through appropriate judicial channels, concluding that these steps constituted appropriate remedial measures. The matter drew criticism from advocacy group Legal Accountability Project, which argued the response was insufficient and highlighted broader concerns about accountability mechanisms within the federal judiciary.

== Personal life ==
Griggsby is a member of the National Presbyterian Church and serves as a Deacon.

== See also ==
- List of African-American federal judges
- List of African-American jurists
- List of Native American jurists

Legal offices
Preceded by Francis Allegra	Judge of the United States Court of Federal Claims; 2015–2021	Succeeded by Philip Hadji
Preceded by Catherine C. Blake	Judge of the United States District Court for the District of Maryland; 2021–present	Incumbent
