= JWCC =

JWCC may refer to:

- ISU Junior World Challenge Cup, international synchronized skating competition
- Japan Women's Curling Championship, annual curling championship hosted in Japan
- John Wood Community College, college in Quincy, Illinois
- Joint Warfighter Cloud Capability, a U.S. Department of Defense cloud computing procurement contract
- Jurassic World Camp Cretaceous, an American animated TV series
- JSON With Commas and Comments, an extension to the JSON data format
