= Bruggink =

Bruggink is a surname. Notable people with the surname include:

- Arnold Bruggink (born 1977), Dutch footballer
- Eric G. Bruggink (born 1949), United States Court of Federal Claims judge
- Gerard Bruggink, (1917–2005) Dutch air force pilot
- Gert-Jan Bruggink (born 1981), Dutch equestrian
