= Judge Block =

Judge Block may refer to:

- Frederic Block (born 1934), judge of the United States District Court for the Eastern District of New York
- Lawrence J. Block (born 1951), judge of the United States Court of Federal Claims

== See also ==
- Alan N. Bloch (born 1932), judge of the United States District Court for the Western District of Pennsylvania
