= List of Jurassic World Camp Cretaceous episodes =

Jurassic World Camp Cretaceous is an American animated science fiction action-adventure television series developed by Zack Stentz.

The series debuted on Netflix on September 18, 2020. In 2021, a second season was released on January 22; a third on May 21; and a fourth season on December 3. A fifth and final season was released on July 21, 2022. A standalone interactive special titled Hidden Adventure was released on November 15, 2022.

== Series overview ==
Season	Episodes	Originally released
1	8	September 18, 2020
2	8	January 22, 2021
3	10	May 21, 2021
4	11	December 3, 2021
5	12	July 21, 2022
Special		November 15, 2022

== Episodes ==
=== Season 1 (2020) ===
No. overall	No. in season	Title	Directed by	Written by	Original release date
1	1	"Camp Cretaceous"	Lane Lueras	Zack Stentz; Scott Kreamer	September 18, 2020
Dinosaur enthusiast Darius Bowman is given the chance to visit Camp Cretaceous after winning a video game. At the camp, he meets head counselors Roxie and Dave, and his fellow campers—self-entitled VIP Kenji Kon, phone addict Brooklynn, friendly cowgirl Sammy Guiterrez, athletic loner Yasmina Fadoula, and nervous germophobe Ben Pincus. Late at night, Darius decides to sneak out after curfew to visit an enclosure containing his favorite Compsognathus ("Compy"), which he and the group met earlier. He is followed by Kenji and Brooklynn, and after an incident, the trio mistakenly allows a group of Velociraptors to come face-to-face with Kenji and Darius.
2	2	"Secrets"	Dan Riba	Sheela Shrinivas	September 18, 2020
After Roxie and Dave save the pair, Darius and Kenji are punished and tasked with shoveling dino poop, while the rest of the group visits a genetics lab where they witness the early birth of an Ankylosaurus, nicknamed Bumpy, who bonds with Ben. While Brooklynn is caught entering restricted parts of the lab by Dr. Henry Wu after encountering Sammy sneaking around in it, Darius and Kenji leave their shoveling task to view a Carnotaurus (later named Toro). They manage to return in time, and Darius and Kenji become friends. Late at night, an anonymous person inserts a flash drive into a drone, which is then sent into Isla Nublar to record the dinosaurs.
3	3	"The Cattle Drive"	Zesung Kang	Rick Williams	September 18, 2020
The next day, the kids are given the chance to ride Gyrospheres near a group of dinosaurs. After a storm grows nearby, Dave and Roxie ask the kids to stay behind while they investigate. The group ignores the instructions and ultimately causes a stampede of dinosaurs. After getting a Sinoceratops to help rescue Darius and Brooklynn from a patch of sinking mud, the group manages to return to safety. Afterward, Sammy and Yasmina bond as friends, but on her video, Brooklynn catches Sammy taking a DNA sample from the Sinoceratops.
4	4	"Things Fall Apart"	Michael Mullen	M. Willis	September 18, 2020
As the group is left alone once again by Roxie and Dave, Brooklynn suspects Sammy may be up to something; her suspicion grows after her phone disappears soon after. Outside, the group watches as the Indominus rex goes on a rampage through the camp. The group runs back to their bunkers, only to find them destroyed by the I. rex. Deciding to find help, the group heads south under the command and leadership of Darius, while the I. rex arrives at the Carnotaurus paddock and breaks Toro out.
5	5	"Happy Birthday, Eddie!"	Zesung Kang	Josie Campbell	September 18, 2020
Heading to the genetics lab, the group reunites with Bumpy. The group arrives with her at the genetics lab, where they find a paranoid scientist named Eddie, who tells the group of Wu’s involvement in the creation of the Indominus rex. After Eddie is killed by the I. rex, the group manages to escape in a van. During the drive, Sammy accidentally reveals that she stole Brooklynn's phone, causing Yaz to crash the van while distracted with shock.
6	6	"Welcome to Jurassic World"	Michael Mullen	Zack Stentz	September 18, 2020
In the van's wreckage, Sammy reveals to the group that she has been working as a spy for a bioengineering company called Mantah Corp (a rival company of InGen), to pay off her family's debts, destroying her friendship with Yaz. After a crashed helicopter (flown by Simon Masrani) causes a flock of Pteranodons to escape their aviary, (Note: As depicted in Jurassic World (2015).) the group heads to the main park to look for help. After the group survives an encounter with the Mosasaurus in the Lagoon, a siren blares in the park.
7	7	"Last Day of Camp"	Eric Elrod	Sheela Shrinivas	September 18, 2020
To evacuate the island, the group plans to head to the park's main dock on a monorail, but Toro attacks them there and the group narrowly escapes onto the monorail. During the ride, the campers are attacked by the flock of Pteranodons that escaped earlier in the day. After a wrecked train is spotted on the tracks, Ben completes a railroad switch to prevent the train from derailing. While celebrating, a Pteranodon causes Ben to fall off the train.
8	8	"End of the Line"	Zesung Kang	Scott Kreamer	September 18, 2020
Shortly after Ben's fall, the group leaves the train to enter the park's tunnels. There, they encounter a group of "Compies" and are attacked by Toro. After a brawl, the group manages to get the dinosaur to run away. They finally reach the dock, only to find they have been left behind. They vow not to stop trying to find a way off the island. Deep inside the island, Bumpy approaches a motionless Ben whose fingers suddenly twitch, revealing he survived the fall.

=== Season 2 (2021) ===
No. overall	No. in season	Title	Directed by	Written by	Original release date
9	1	"A Beacon of Hope"	Michael Mullen	Rick Williams	January 22, 2021
Following the discovery they have been left on the island, the group reaches Main Street, where they find walkie-talkies, a working camera, and information on an emergency distress beacon on the island. Darius begins to suffer from severe hallucinations about Ben and Fredrick Bowman, his deceased father. The following day, the group discovers the park's T. rex has entered Main Street and built a small "lair" containing the beacon. Darius and Kenji enter the lair, while Sammy and Brooklynn successfully distract the T. rex, allowing them to send a distress signal with the beacon.
10	2	"The Art of Chill"	Eric Elrod	M. Willis	January 22, 2021
The group returns to the partially destroyed Camp Cretaceous. Kenji stays behind to take care of Yaz, who sprained her ankle while they were trying to escape from the Mosasaurus Lagoon. Darius, Sammy, and Brooklynn venture out to find medical supplies in a nearby clinic. There the group finds food but also encounters dozens of caged and starving dinosaurs. They decide to free them and reunite Grim, a female Baryonyx with its siblings Limbo and Chaos. Back at the camp, the group works on building a treehouse, while Brooklynn notices a grove of frozen flowers.
11	3	"The Watering Hole"	Zesung Kang	Bethany Armstrong Johnson	January 22, 2021
Having built their treehouse near a river to easily access water, the group discovers the river has been drained. Darius and Kenji get a couple of nearby Stegosaurus to remove a recently built dam and follow a Ceratosaurus and discover a watering hole where many types of dinosaurs unite in a peaceful manner to drink water. Yaz, Sammy, and Brooklynn find air vents underneath more frozen flowers and a genetics lab nearby. Learning the lab could be connected to Mantah Corp, and a secret kept by Dr. Wu, the trio is forced to leave after encountering the pack of Baryonyxes that Darius, Sammy, and Brooklynn had met previously at the clinic. However, before leaving, the group takes an envelope titled "E750" containing various codes and a keycard. Back at the camp, the reunited group sees a campfire while celebrating, leading them to believe that there could be other people on the island.
12	4	"Salvation"	Michael Mullen	Sheela Shrinivas	January 22, 2021
Running towards the campfire, the group finds two eco-tourists named Mitch and Tiff and their brooding tour guide Hap, who tells the group that a boat will pick them up in two days. While the rest of the group decides to spend the day watching dinosaurs, Brooklynn and Kenji decide to investigate Hap after growing suspicious of him, but are caught trying to sneak into his yurt. Moments later, the pair catches an angry Hap telling Tiff on a walkie-talkie that he will "take care of [the] kids" himself. After being pursued into a dead-end, Brooklynn and Kenji watch as Hap is knocked unconscious by Ben who is still alive with a now-grown Bumpy.
13	5	"Brave"	Eric Elrod	Lindsay Kerns	January 22, 2021
In a flashback, Ben survives his fall without any injury. Deciding to search for the emergency distress beacon on the island, Ben begins his journey to Main Street alongside Bumpy. He faces a number of obstacles in his way, including a now scarred Toro, and returns to his makeshift camp. Ben eventually becomes annoyed with Bumpy's company to the point where they accidentally destroy their shelter, and he roars at her, forcing the dinosaur to run away. After several weeks of surviving on his own, Ben decides to fight Toro to get to Main Street. He reunites with a now-grown Bumpy while doing so, and the two force Toro off a cliff. Investigating a glimpse of smoke from a campfire, Ben overhears Hap, Mitch, and Tiff talking about a secret "plan" to deal with the rest of his friends.
14	6	"Misguided"	Leah Artwick	Rick Williams	January 22, 2021
Sammy, Yaz, and Darius discover that Mitch and Tiff are actually big-game hunters trying to kill dinosaurs on the island, and are forced to lead the pair to the watering hole. Meanwhile, Hap tries to help Ben, Brooklynn, and Kenji by leading them to a boat on the shore of Isla Nublar. However, Hap is forced to sacrifice himself to fend off the pack of Baryonyxes. Mitch and Tiff attempt to shoot a Stegosaurus, but Darius whistles, alerting the Stegosaurus, which attacks Mitch and Tiff, confusing them, during which Yaz escapes and finds Brooklynn and Kenji, telling them that Darius and Sammy are secretly leading Mitch and Tiff to Main Street.
15	7	"Step One"	Michael Mullen	Sheela Shrinivas	January 22, 2021
Informed about the situation, Ben, Yaz, Brooklynn, and Kenji use the underground tunnels to arrive at a surveillance room to watch what is happening on Main Street. After the T. rex arrives and scares Mitch and Tiff into the jungle, Sammy and Darius tell the rest of the group that Mitch and Tiff have found the location of the watering hole and are going there to kill the dinosaurs. Meanwhile, while Kenji is messing with the buttons, he unknowingly opens a room numbered “E750”.
16	8	"Chaos Theory"	Eric Elrod	Josie Campbell	January 22, 2021
To save the dinosaurs, the group decides to scare them away from the watering hole, inadvertently causing a stampede during which the T. rex pursues the dinosaurs. Mitch and Tiff attempt to kill Darius and Brooklynn but the dinosaurs come to their rescue, scaring Mitch and Tiff off. In the chaos, Grim is killed by Tiff, Mitch is eaten by the T. rex, and although Tiff manages to escape on the boat, she is killed onboard by the Baryonyx siblings Limbo and Chaos who avenge their sister, leaving the teenagers once again stranded on the island. Meanwhile, a creature previously in cryostasis manages to escape from the room numbered "E750".

=== Season 3 (2021) ===
No. overall	No. in season	Title	Directed by	Written by	Original release date
17	1	"View from the Top"	Leah Artwick	Lindsay Kerns	May 21, 2021
After several weeks full of attempts to get off the island, the group searches for the supplies necessary to build a second, more resilient raft, following a failed try that destroyed their first. Traveling to a peak on the island known as Lookout Point, the group splits to find material for the sail, with Kenji, Yaz, Sammy, and Brooklynn heading up on a gondola lift and Darius staying behind to investigate a moody Ben. Ben reveals he does not want to leave Bumpy on the island if they are rescued. At Lookout Point, Kenji, Yaz, Sammy, and Brooklynn are attacked by several Dimorphodons. While Kenji and Sammy head back down on the gondolas, Yaz and Brooklynn use hang gliders to escape. Back together, Kenji and Sammy reveal they spotted Mitch and Tiff's boat, which is big enough to carry Bumpy, drifting near the island's shore. As they celebrate, the "E750" creature is seen killing a Ceratosaurus.
18	2	"Safe Harbor"	Michael Mullen	Rick Williams	May 21, 2021
After getting on the boat, the group discovers that while it is damaged and almost out of gas; it can still be sailed and can be refuelled on the other side of the island. Once there, the group has a yacht party. At night, the hull of the boat is punctured and they look for supplies to patch the hole. Meanwhile, Brooklynn and Darius try to get Kenji back for pranking them, while Sammy tries to befriend Bumpy. Because of a thick fog, the group cannot see several Ouranosauruses surround them and they are attacked. Regrouped, they return to the boat, use tape to patch the puncture, and float away after scaring off the Ouranosauruses using fireworks. In the morning, Sammy becomes friends with Bumpy by simply giving her snacks. Darius suspects something is wrong, as Ouranosauruses are supposed to be herbivores, yet they attempted to prey on the children. While the group sails back to the dock, the "E750" creature kills two Ouranosauruses.
19	3	"Casa De Kenji"	Eric Elrod	Sheela Shrinivas; Bethany Armstrong Johnson; Lindsay Kerns; Rick Williams	May 21, 2021
To find supplies to fix the hole in the boat, the group travels to a penthouse on the island owned by Kenji's father. After several Monolophosauruses enter the premises and attack, Kenji, Brooklynn, and Darius climb down an elevator shaft while Sammy, Yaz, and Ben escape through the vents and down into the basement level garage. There, the trio finds sealant, siphons gasoline from multiple vehicles, and escapes several Monolophosauruses by driving a limousine out of the garage, before picking up the rest of the group outside. Elsewhere on the island, the "E750" creature destroys a drone.
20	4	"Clever Girl"	Leah Artwick	Zack Stentz	May 21, 2021
After reading that the sealant dries in 48 hours, the group splits; Kenji, Yaz, and Darius search for a "Compy" that stole their compass, and Sammy and Brooklynn investigate the meaning behind "E750". Tracking the "Compy" to the derelict Jurassic Park visitor center, Kenji, Yaz, and Darius are attacked by "Blue". (Note: A Velociraptor first introduced in Jurassic World.) After a chase, Blue is pinned under a vehicle, and the trio decides to rescue her from the vengeful Compies and befriend her in the process. Meanwhile, Sammy and Brooklynn find the "E750" room and several pre-recorded videos from Dr. Wu, revealing the eponymous creature to be an aggressive, unpredictable hybrid dinosaur known as the "Scorpios rex", created using the genes of the scorpionfish. They turn around to see that the glass container restraining the creature has shattered, meaning the deadly dinosaur is now loose on the island.
21	5	"Eye of the Storm"	Michael Mullen	Bethany Armstrong Johnson	May 21, 2021
Kenji lets Darius go off alone to observe a group of Gallimimus for his notebook, but after a sudden stampede of dinosaurs, Darius discovers that they are being hunted by the Scorpios rex. With Sammy and Brooklynn still out investigating, Yaz and Kenji search for Ben after he goes missing and find him feeding Bumpy. Regrouped and fearing that the Scorpios rex will soon find them, the campers pack supplies to get off the island as soon as possible, but because of a severe rainstorm, their plans are put on hold. They return to camp to hide from the Scorpios rex, and set up an electrified fence around it. However, the creature manages to jump over the fence and attacks the group; they try to escape but the fence traps them inside. Distracted by a small lightning fire, the Scorpios rex leaves after hearing other dinosaurs in the distance. As the group calms down, they notice that Sammy has been impaled with quills from the Scorpios rex and she falls unconscious.
22	6	"The Long Run"	Eric Elrod	Sheela Shrinivas	May 21, 2021
After Brooklynn reveals the quills are venomous, Yaz travels to the "E750" room in search of an antidote while Ben and Darius decide to create a large explosion to distract the Scorpios rex. After finding the antidote, Yaz tries to outrun the Scorpios rex but sprains her ankle after jumping over a stream, allowing the creature to catch up to her. She remembers all the times when Sammy was there for her in times of need, which gives her the courage to confront the furious Scorpios rex. After Ben sets fire to a gondola, which explodes at the top of Lookout Point, the Scorpios rex leaves. Back with the group, Yaz gives Sammy the antidote, saving her life.
23	7	"A Shock to the System"	Leah Artwick	Bethany Armstrong Johnson; Rick Williams	May 21, 2021
After Ben leaves the group again to find Bumpy, Darius is tasked with finding Ben by morning or the others will leave them behind on the island. After finding Ben, the pair locates Bumpy and prepares to return to the boat. However, Ben reveals his personal decision to stay on the island, and argues and fights with Darius. Meanwhile, Yaz is acting very positive to encourage Sammy, but ends up confusing the others. Shortly after, Bumpy finds a herd of Ankylosaurus, who protect her when the Scorpios Rex attacks, convincing Ben to leave her with them. Although Darius and Ben are late, Yaz, Kenji, Brooklynn, and Sammy decide to not leave the island without them but are confronted by a stampede of Parasaurolophuses as the Scorpios rex begins to approach. They board the boat and sail off escaping without Ben and Darius. As dawn breaks, Ben and Darius finally reach the dock but discover that there are actually two Scorpios rexes on the island, as they are cornered by both creatures.
24	8	"Escape from Isla Nublar"	Michael Mullen	Lindsay Kerns	May 21, 2021
As the two Scorpios rexes fight, Ben and Darius hide in the limo. The rest of the group returns to the island to search for them. Regrouped, they decide they have to stop both Scorpios rexes to save the rest of the dinosaurs and head to the Jurassic Park visitor center, where they recover a tranquilizer gun Darius had found earlier. As both of the Scorpios rexes attack again, Darius shoots the gun but misses. After a chase and another encounter with Blue, who helps the campers by attacking the Scorpios rexes, the group destroys the visitor center with both Scorpios rexes inside, killing them. At the dock, the group boards the boat as Ben stays behind, but Ben changes his mind, and the entire group begins their journey to Costa Rica. While sailing away, several helicopters surround the boat and order the group to return to the island.
25	9	"Whatever It Takes"	Eric Elrod	Joanna Lewis; Kristine Songco	May 21, 2021
Returning to the dock, the group learns the helicopters are carrying armed mercenaries, and they quickly realize they are not there to rescue them. Soon after, one helicopter is attacked by the T. rex and flies away with Ben, Kenji, and Sammy onboard. After the helicopter crashes, Ben, Kenji, and Sammy escape. Meanwhile, the T. rex chases Darius, Yaz, and Brooklynn but upon reaching Main Street it becomes distracted by another group of mercenaries there to retrieve a sample from the remains of the Indominus rex. (Note: As depicted in Jurassic World: Fallen Kingdom (2018).) In another helicopter, Dr. Wu arrives and reveals his plans to retrieve his private laptop. Darius, Yaz, and Brooklynn agree to steal it first, thinking it could be used to have Dr. Wu incarcerated for creating the hybrid dinosaurs. Traveling through the lab's vents, the three campers take the laptop. Brooklynn is kidnapped by one of Dr. Wu's mercenaries; before she is dragged away, she gives Darius the laptop.
26	10	"Stay on Mission"	Leah Artwick	Rick Williams	May 21, 2021
The other campers regroup and agree to copy the laptop's contents onto Sammy's flash drive, which she brought to the island when she was originally a spy, before wiping the laptop. An anxious Kenji, however, steals the laptop to return it to Dr. Wu. During the handover, the rest of the campers, with Bumpy and several Ankylosaurus, distract Dr. Wu and his remaining mercenaries while they rescue Kenji and Brooklynn. Although Sammy and Yaz destroy the laptop, Wu and the mercenaries leave after he learns they have successfully obtained a sample from the Indominus rex. The reunited group leaves on the boat and begins their trip to Costa Rica, but a rift forms between Darius and Kenji over the latter handing over the laptop. On the boat, a door rattles, revealing a creature is on board.

=== Season 4 (2021) ===
No. overall	No. in season	Title	Directed by	Written by	Original release date
27	1	"Beneath the Surface"	Michael Mullen	Sheela Shrinivas	December 3, 2021
The campers celebrate their escape from the island. Kenji remains furious with Darius over risking Brooklynn's life for the laptop. While waiting to arrive in Costa Rica, the campers find a "Compy" on the boat, which was the creature that was rattling the door. Sammy, Darius, Yaz, and Ben go to catch the "Compy" while Kenji and Brooklynn try to fix a radar on the boat. Brooklynn successfully repairs the radar but the others are unable to catch the "Compy". Kenji notices the boat's propeller is stuck in seaweed, so Darius goes into the ocean to remove it. Shortly after removing the seaweed from the propeller, Kenji and Brooklynn see a shark on the radar. Trying to swim back to the boat, Darius is caught in the seaweed, so Kenji dives under to save him. Shortly after getting back on the boat, the campers try to fend off the Mosasaurus, which eats the shark and starts biting the boat. It disappears for a while, but then comes back to the surface and jumps in the air, landing on the boat and destroying it. The group then wakes up uninjured on an unknown island.
28	2	"At Least..."	Eric Elrod	Bethany Armstrong Johnson	December 3, 2021
The group wanders into a desert as a sandstorm begins to form. Unable to see, Kenji and Brooklynn tumble down a ravine. While trying to find a way out, Kenji shows affection to Brooklynn. The sandstorm ends, and they manage to regroup shortly after. At night, the group notices a Smilodon in a bush. Ben runs away to distract the Smilodon while the group departs to help Ben. At a dead-end, Ben battles the Smilodon, but Kenji catches up and they manage to scare the animal away. At dawn, the group begins taking off further into the island. Kenji trips on a piece of metal and the group follows it to an invisible wall that opens to reveal a metal hallway.
29	3	"Turning Dr. Turner"	Leah Artwick	Joanna Lewis; Kristine Songco	December 3, 2021
At the other end of the hallway, the group finds themselves in a forest. They encounter Dr. Mae Turner, who is studying how dinosaurs interact with one another. She works for Mantah Corp, lives on the island and cannot interact with the outside world because she does not have a phone. Yaz notices that Kenji has a crush on Brooklynn. While Darius and Sammy distract Mae, the rest of the group go outside and spot a B.R.A.D., a robot that kills the "Compy" from the boat because it is an "unauthorized lifeform" on the island. Mae stops the B.R.A.D. before it finds the rest of the group. Back inside, the group explains their situation and why they do not trust Mantah Corp. Mae goes outside along with Darius and Sammy. The trio watches as a Tyrannosaurus rex mother and child, "Big Eatie" and "Little Eatie", begin to hurt one another. Mae tries to summon the B.R.A.D. but Kenji destroys the robot when it tries to kill Yaz and Ben. Another B.R.A.D. stops the T. rexes from fighting. Mae and the group learn Mantah Corp has been feeding the dinosaurs a new drug to make them highly aggressive.
30	4	"Rude Awakening"	Michael Mullen	Rick Williams	December 3, 2021
The group plans to stop the T. rexes from consuming the tampered food so a supply plane will arrive earlier than expected. While removing the food, the T. rexes wake up and Yaz enters a state of shock and is unable to move. Kenji rescues her and regroups with the others. A B.R.A.D. tries to kill the group because they are "unauthorized lifeforms". When Mae tries to stop them, several B.R.A.D.s begin to chase them. Brooklynn manages to trap the B.R.A.D.s inside a hallway. However, the group enters a tundra biome with freezing temperatures. Mae spots Pierce, a Kentrosaurus suited for warmer temperatures, inside the biome and suffering from hypothermic shock. Yaz becomes anxious about catching the supply plane, which will arrive in an hour. As a group, everyone works together to save Pierce. Several B.R.A.D.s begin to give pursuit but fall into a frozen lake. The group makes it out and says goodbye to Mae. They are too late, and the plane leaves without them.
31	5	"The Long Game"	Eric Elrod	Sheela Shrinivas	December 3, 2021
The group decides to stay with Mae to take down Mantah Corp. Mae's boss, Kash D. Langford, arrives on the island, furious by the B.R.A.D.s' defeats. Sammy recognizes Kash as the person who blackmailed her family and hired her to be a spy. Mae argues with Kash for hurting the dinosaurs. In return, Kash orders the B.R.A.D.s to kill her. With the help of the group, she manages to escape and destroy several of the B.R.A.D.s. Soon after, a couple of Velociraptors surrounds the group. Sammy uses a still-functional B.R.A.D. to injure the Velociraptors and force them to leave. Meanwhile, Ben notices that Kash has a phone.
32	6	"Mission Critical"	Leah Artwick	Bethany Armstrong Johnson	December 3, 2021
The group decides to split up after Mae is injured by one of the Velociraptors. Ben locates a medical kit and helps Mae. Yaz and Brooklynn find a warehouse filled with B.R.A.D.s. Back together, the group watches as Kash uses drones and several B.R.A.D.s to force Big Eatie and Pierce to fight. Brooklynn notices that Kenji likes her. Ben, Sammy, and Yaz blow up the warehouse to distract Kash. Darius enters Kash's office to stop the dinosaur fight and retrieve Kash's phone. When a B.R.A.D. takes the phone, Darius is forced to choose between helping the dinosaurs or helping his group. He chooses his group and retrieves the phone. He calls his older brother Brandon Bowman, but is found by Kash, who hangs up the call.
33	7	"Staying Alive"	Michael Mullen	Joanna Lewis; Kristine Songco	December 3, 2021
Darius makes up a story to explain to Kash how he got on the island. He also persuades Kash to stop the dinosaur fight by telling him that dinosaurs are expensive. Kash takes Darius to an underground medical facility. While Kash is on the phone, Darius helps heal Big Eatie's injuries. Meanwhile in the desert biome, the rest of the group encounters a Spinosaurus. (Note: As depicted in Jurassic Park III (2001).) They also run into a Smilodon (possibly the same one that attacked them earlier), only for it to be eaten by the Spinosaurus before the animal could kill them. Darius pretends to agree with everything Kash says to avoid angering him. As the pair enter an elevator, the rest of the group finds the facility. Darius quickly exits the elevator as the doors close. The group makes a plan on how to stop Kash. When the elevator doors reopen, Darius makes up an excuse and reunites with Kash, who fails to notice the rest of the group. Back home, Brandon decides to leave to find Darius.
34	8	"Technical Difficulties"	Eric Elrod	Rick Williams	December 3, 2021
At night, Kash shows Darius an upgraded model of B.R.A.D. known as B.R.A.D.-X. The following day, Darius is tasked with planting a control chip on the Spinosaurus. Kash orders a B.R.A.D.-X to kill Darius if he fails to do so. Meanwhile, the rest of the group finds a warehouse where B.R.A.D.-Xs are being powered on by other B.R.A.D.s. Brooklynn manages to hack a B.R.A.D. and learn its programming to access the B.R.A.D.-Xs. Outside, Darius is about to chip the Spinosaurus when the B.R.A.D.orders him to stop. The B.R.A.D.-X is revealed to have been accessed by Brooklynn. Darius destroys the chip and returns to Kash's office. Kash discovers the brains of fully-developed dinosaurs rejects the chip's orders, so he decides to experiment on baby dinosaurs.
35	9	"Dino-Sitting"	Leah Artwick	Sheela Shrinivas	December 3, 2021
Darius challenges Kash to a video game to distract him. The rest of the group uncovers a testing facility filled with baby dinosaur hybrids. When they accidentally open several doors containing adult dinosaur hybrids that begin wreaking havoc, the group manages to escape alongside two baby Spinoceratops, nicknaming them "Angel" and "Rebel", and a baby Brachiosaurus, which imprint on and bond with them. Kash and Darius go down to investigate. When a Ceratosaurus begins to run towards them, the pair hides in an elevator. Later, Kash discovers that the dinosaur hybrids are missing.
36	10	"Taking Control"	Michael Mullen	Leore Berris	December 3, 2021
The baby Brachiosaurus is captured by the B.R.A.D.-Xs. Kash immediately chips the baby Brachiosaurus despite Darius' pleas. Meanwhile, Kenji and Brooklynn tell each other that they like one another. A flock of Pteranodons attacks the group, but they manage to escape. Darius and Ben trap Kash inside Mae's office. The pair save the baby Brachiosaurus before reuniting with Mae and the rest of the group. Ben befriends the baby Brachiosaurus and nicknames her "Firecracker". Meanwhile, on Isla Nublar, Bumpy, saddened by Ben's departure, revisits the abandoned camp base before resting alone.
37	11	"Who's the Boss?"	Eric Elrod	Bethany Armstrong Johnson	December 3, 2021
Brooklynn tells Yaz and Sammy about her relationship with Kenji. In the desert biome, the trio, Angel, and Rebel encounter the Spinosaurus once more. They take Angel and Rebel to the tundra biome, where the dinosaurs are better suited. Ben and Mae discuss using their instincts versus using their scientific knowledge to bond with dinosaurs. Darius and Kenji discover that Kash has escaped. Inside Kash's office, Darius sees Kash meeting Daniel Kon, the president of Mantah Corp. Kash and Daniel successfully set up a trap in the swamp biome to capture the group, which fends off a pack of Dilophosauruses. Surrounded by B.R.A.D.-Xs, the group learns that Daniel is Kenji's father.

=== Season 5 (2022) ===
No. overall	No. in season	Title	Directed by	Written by	Original release date
38	1	"Reunited"	Leah Artwick	Joanna Lewis; Kristine Songco	July 21, 2022
Kenji's father, Daniel, is relieved to see his son alive, while Kenji is in disbelief of his father's new position. Daniel claims that Kash was responsible for Mantah Corp's actions, having him arrested, and gives the campers their own rooms in a penthouse. Brooklynn is not sure that they can trust him, and she and Sammy confront Kash in his cell, regarding Sammy's family. Told to look over Daniel's files in his office, they learn that Daniel owns Sammy's family ranch. Confronted, Daniel claims that he bought them out of debt, and they work for him. Kenji tries to reconnect with his father, but Daniel prioritizes an upcoming meeting with investors, in which Daniel must present dinosaurs fighting. Darius is worried about Big Eatie not eating, realizing she misses her daughter, so he and the campers free Big Eatie and reunite her with her daughter. The campers tell Daniel that with Mae's research, they can communicate with the dinosaurs, and Daniel tells Kenji he is proud of him. While the campers celebrate with a sleepover, Daniel has Mae locked up, ordering her to work with him and Kash, or he will harm the campers.
39	2	"The Final Test"	Michael Mullen	Leore Berris	July 21, 2022
Kenji announces to his friends he is going to help with the presentation, and a suspicious Darius and Brooklyn plan to spy on Daniel. Daniel, aware of their scheme, has Mae warn the kids off. When the three look for Kash's cell, they learn that he escaped. Investigating Kash's room, they discover that there are drones in the forest biome. Meanwhile Kenji is preparing for his date with Brooklynn, unaware that she is out with the others. Darius, Ben and Brooklynn witness Kash use Mae's research to control Big Eatie's movement and behavior. Daniel, learning what Brooklynn is up to, sends raptors, drones and Big Eatie stalk her and the others, claiming to Kenji that Brooklynn was seeing Ben and Darius behind his back. Kenji is convinced to attend the business meeting with Daniel. Brooklynn and the boys manage to reach the penthouse, only to witness Kenji entertaining the investors with his stories of dinosaur encounters. Meanwhile, Darius' brother Brandon videochats with Roxie and Dave, affirming his belief his brother is still alive.
40	3	"Battle Lines"	Eric Elrod	Rick Williams	July 21, 2022
Brooklynn tries to apologize to Kenji and explain herself. Kenji, trusting his dad and furious at Brooklynn, does not believe her. When Ben and Darius explain the situation, Kenji goes to talk to his father. Daniel confesses to his plans, claiming that it is ultimately for the good of the dinosaurs. Daniel tells Kenji that Brooklynn and Sammy broke into his office, and that his friends do not trust either of them. When Mae spots Ben and Brooklynn spying on her, she gives them power cells that would scramble the control chips. At the meeting, Daniel has Kash escorted out. Daniel shows his investors how they can control the dinosaurs. The investors attempt to test them by having the dinosaurs fight. The campers have the controls scrambled, getting all but one of the investors killed. Kash takes one of the controls, planning to kill Daniel, but is killed by the raptors instead. Kenji takes the drones and guides the dinosaurs away, with both he and Daniel having the other campers locked up. The surviving investor, Lana Molina, representing BioSyn, says they are still on board, while Kenji disowns his friends.
41	4	"Evasive Action"	Leah Artwick	Bethany Armstrong Johnson	July 21, 2022
While Daniel, Mae, Kenji and Lana Molina return to Isla Nublar, they make a stop at Daniel's old penthouse. Daniel plans on another demonstration, using Isla Nublar's dinosaurs, and wants Kenji to help due to his experience with them. Hawkes shows up, now working for Daniel. In their cell, Darius deduces that B.R.A.D X checks on them every half-hour, giving them time to escape. They find a way out through the sewers before being pursued by the B.R.A.D X and end up separated. Sammy and Darius come across the engine powering the island and are attacked by a Nothosaurus lurking in the sewers. Yaz, Ben and Brooklynn come to their rescue, luring the B.R.A.D X to fight the Nothosaurus. This damages the pipes, overheating the engine and collapsing the tunnel. When they escape, Darius notices the Eaties are frightened by something. On Isla Nublar, Daniel and company notice a similarly frightened Stegosaurus, right as an earthquake hits both islands. Kenji and Hawkes fall into a pit, coming face to face with Toro the Carnotaurus. Meanwhile, Brad, Dave and Roxie reach Isla Nublar in search of the campers.
42	5	"Shaky Ground"	Michael Mullen	Joanna Lewis; Kristine Songco	July 21, 2022
Toro almost kills Hawkes, but Kenji manages to control Toro with the Mantah Corp tech. Impressed, Daniel decides to use Toro for his experiment. On the other island, the campers think that the drones may be scaring the dinosaurs following the earthquake. While Darius stays with the Eaties, Brooklynn leads the rest to the island's facility, shutting them down. The campers discover the distress beacon they sent from Isla Nublar was picked up by Mantah Corp, but Daniel ignored it. Brand, Dave and Roxie search for the kids and encounter Chaos the Baryonyx. Sammy and Yaz realize that there is a drone on Isla Nublar they can control. They witness Kenji demonstrating his control over Toro, leaving Brooklyn heartbroken that he sided with his father. Another earthquake hits both islands, with Big Eatie trapped under a tree and Kenji trapped in a rockslide. Kenji uses Toro to help him out, while the campers work together to free Big Eatie. Brooklynn vents to Darius about her feelings towards Kenji and his betrayal. Darius claims that while he distrusts Kenji, he forgives him, and affirms that they will stop Daniel's plans.
43	6	"Out of the Pack"	Eric Elrod	Leore Berris	July 21, 2022
As the campers sabotage Mantah Corp's operations on the island, Kenji and his father meet with Lewis Dodgson, whom Daniel intends to sell his mind control chips to. Kenji manages to protect Bumpy from being enslaved, but he starts to become disillusioned by his father's cruelty and lack of care. The group attempts to capture Blue, but she leads them into a Dilophosaurus nest that they narrowly escape from. In the process, Dodgson accidentally finds and retrieves the old Barbasol can with the embryos that Dennis Nedry had stolen for him back in 1993. The group captures and enslaves several dinosaurs, including Toro and Limbo, but Lana Molina attempts to make off with Dodgson's pack before Kenji stops her and she is eaten by a pack of Compys. Pleased, Dodgson makes a deal with Daniel to manufacture and ship the chips to BioSyn within two weeks.
44	7	"The Leap"	Leah Artwick	Bethany Armstrong Johnson; Rick Williams	July 21, 2022
In order to protect the dinosaurs when Daniel comes back, the campers decide to create a watering hole for them. While Darius and Brooklynn distract Big and Little Eatie, Ben and Yaz gather their dinosaur friends, although they encounter some problems with Firecracker and two Dilophosaurus and Sammy enters the tunnels to increase the water flow to their chosen spot, encountering and evading a surviving BRAD-X. While alone with Ben, Yaz admits that she has a crush on Sammy and she is unsure what to do about it. Their plan succeeds and the group enjoys the watering hole with all of the dinosaurs gathering peacefully.
45	8	"Clean Break"	Michael Mullen	Sheela Shrinivas	July 21, 2022
Dodgson demands that Mantah Corp acquire DNA samples from some of the Nublar dinosaurs before leaving. While collecting the samples, Mae finds herself entranced by the beauty of the Parasaurolophuses, and betrays Mantah Corp after learning that the kids have escaped, destroying her samples. Kenji, filled with growing doubt, turns on his father completely after discovering that Daniel has captured Bumpy, despite promising to leave his friend alone. Kenji helps Mae escape, but he chooses to return to his father rather than risk Daniel staying to look for him. At the same time, Roxie, Dave and Brandon search the island for the campers without success, but they discover Mitch and Tiff's campsite. That night, Mae finds the trio and offers them her help.
46	9	"The Core"	Eric Elrod	Joanna Lewis; Kristine Songco	July 21, 2022
With Ben's encouragement, Yaz approaches Sammy to confess her feelings but is interrupted by Brooklyn and Darius, who set up a drone to monitor the island. Brooklynn records the group on their tablet, letting people know they survived Isla Nublar. Darius plans on trapping the Kons in the facility. Yaz and Sammy soon discover the island's geo-energy core is malfunctioning, damaged by the earlier fight, and the earthquakes are being caused by a misaligned drill located near a fault line, which gives the core its power. The campers realize the core is overheating and are attacked by the Nothosaurus. The latter passes out, and the campers refuse to leave it behind and decided to move it to the swamp biome, while Darius and Brooklynn go to repair the core. Brooklynn passes out, and is rescued by Darius, but they successfully repair the core. While Yaz confesses her feelings for Sammy, the Nothosaurus attempts to attack them. Once the campers escape, Darius feels conflicted about tricking Kenji. Sammy reciprocates Yaz's feelings and the two kiss. The Kons return to the island, with Kenji controlling Toro, Limbo and Bumpy among those captured.
47	10	"Arrival"	Leah Artwick	Leore Berris	July 21, 2022
Daniel reveals that there is a backup of the mind control chip blueprints in a flash drive in the jaw of one of the B.R.A.D.-Xs and orders his men to find it and to capture the campers so that he can get the new password. The group splits up with Darius, Yaz and Sammy searching the biomes for the flash drive and Ben attempting to rescue Bumpy. Although they manage to find the flash drive, Daniel and Hawkes attack with the mind-controlled Spinosaurus and retrieve the drive but remain locked out of the computer. At the same time, a remorseful Kenji helps Ben to rescue Bumpy, discovering in the process that smashing the controllers breaks the mind control. Ben brings Bumpy and Kenji back to the others, who are shocked by Kenji's return.
48	11	"The Last Stand"	Michael Mullen	Bethany Armstrong Johnson; Sheela Shrinivas; Rick Williams	July 21, 2022
Kenji is accepted back into the group, although Darius remains angry and reluctant to forgive him at first. The two later reconcile after Kenji saves Darius and promises his best friend to always be there for him. While Yasmina and Sammy take the babies to safety, Darius, Kenji, Ben and Bumpy join forces with the free dinosaurs against Daniel, his mercenaries and their mind-controlled dinosaurs with some success at first. After Sammy refuses to give up the password, Daniel takes personal control of the dinosaurs and corners Little Eatie. Big Eatie joins the fight, killing Limbo, but she is apparently killed by the Spinosaurus, much to the horror of the campers.
49	12	"The Nublar Six"	Eric Elrod	Bethany Armstrong Johnson; Sheela Shrinivas; Rick Williams	July 21, 2022
The campers and the dinosaurs hide from Daniel and his forces and consider fleeing the island. The group splits up as Daniel and his forces chase them, resulting in Godinez (the mercenary controlling Toro) getting eaten by Velociraptors and Darius being cornered by the Spinosaurus. Kenji gives up the password, but Daniel deems Darius a witness and sends the Spinosaurus to eat him. He is saved by Big Eatie, who is still alive and drives off the Spinosaurus while Little Eatie kills Hawkes. With a core overload and poisonous gas being released, Daniel flees the island, but Kenji, realizing that his father no longer cares about him, stays with the other campers who had faked the overload. The group destroys the mind control chips and releases the dinosaurs before finally being rescued by Mae, Dave, Roxie and Brandon who have Daniel arrested. Two years later, the group remains in contact with Yasmina and Sammy living together, Ben spending the summer with Mae and Bumpy on Mantah Corp island, Kenji having been adopted by the Bowmans and Brooklynn investigating strange events at the Lockwood Estate while dating Kenji. Hearing a strange noise, Darius is surprised to spot a Brachiosaurus nearby.

=== Special (2022) ===
No. overall	Title	Directed by	Written by	Original release date
50	"Hidden Adventure"	Leah Artwick; Eric Elrod; Michael Mullen	Leore Berris; Julius Harper; Bethany Armstrong Johnson; Sheela Shrinivas; Rick Williams	November 15, 2022

== See also ==
- List of films featuring dinosaurs
