= Edward H. Meyers =

American judge (born 1972)

Ed Meyers
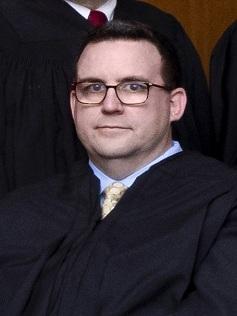
- Meyers in 2022

Judge of the United States Court of Federal Claims
- Incumbent
- Assumed office October 20, 2020
- Appointed by: Donald Trump
- Preceded by: Lawrence J. Block

Personal details
- Born: Edward Hulvey Meyers; 1972 (age 53–54) Washington, D.C., U.S.
- Education: Vanderbilt University (BA); Catholic University (JD)

Edward Hulvey Meyers (born 1972) is an American attorney serving as a judge of the United States Court of Federal Claims.

== Education ==
Meyers earned his Bachelor of Arts from Vanderbilt University and his Juris Doctor, summa cum laude, from the Columbus School of Law, where he served as associate editor of The Catholic University Law Review.

== Career ==
Upon graduation from law school, Meyers served as a law clerk to Judge Loren A. Smith of the United States Court of Federal Claims. From 2006 to 2012, he was in private practice at Kirkland & Ellis. From 2012 to 2020, he was a partner at Stein Mitchell Beato & Missner in Washington, D.C., where his practice focused on litigating bid protests, breach of contract disputes, and copyright infringement matters.

Meyers has been a member of the Federalist Society since 2003 and the American Bar Association since 2006.

=== Claims court service ===
On October 16, 2019, President Donald Trump announced his intent to nominate Meyers to serve as a judge for the United States Court of Federal Claims. On November 19, 2019, his nomination was sent to the Senate. President Trump nominated Meyers to the seat vacated by Judge Lawrence J. Block, who retired on January 8, 2016. On January 3, 2020, his nomination was returned to the President under Rule XXXI, Paragraph 6 of the United States Senate.

On January 6, 2020, his renomination was sent to the Senate. A hearing on his nomination before the Senate Judiciary Committee was held on January 8, 2020. On March 12, 2020, his nomination was reported out of committee by a 15–6 vote. On September 21, 2020, the Senate invoked cloture on his nomination by a 65–25 vote. On September 22, 2020, his nomination was confirmed by a 66–27 vote. He received his judicial commission on October 20, 2020.

Legal offices
Preceded by Lawrence J. Block	Judge of the United States Court of Federal Claims; 2020–present	Incumbent
