= Joint Enterprise Defense Infrastructure =

United States military cloud computing contract

The Joint Enterprise Defense Infrastructure (JEDI) contract was a large United States Department of Defense (DoD) cloud computing contract which has been reported as being worth $10 billion over ten years. JEDI was meant to be a commercial off-the-shelf (COTS) implementation of existing technology, while providing economies of scale to DoD.

== Controversies ==
Initially questions were raised over whether a single contract covering all the DoD's cloud computing needs was appropriate, or whether a multi-cloud approach was more consistent with the existing DoD cloud strategy. The IT Acquisition Advisory Council (ITAAC) argued that a multi-cloud approach would be preferable.

Companies interested in the contract included Amazon, Google, Microsoft and Oracle. After protests from Google employees, Google decided to drop out of contention for the contract because of conflict with its corporate values. The deal was considered "gift-wrapped for Amazon" until Oracle (co-chaired by Safra Catz) contested the contract, citing the National Defense Authorization Act over IDIQ contracts and the conflicts of interest from Deap Ubhi, who worked for Amazon both before and after his time in the Department of Defense. This led Eric G. Bruggink, senior judge of the United States Court of Federal Claims, to place the contract award on hold.

In August 2019, weeks before the winner was expected to be announced, President Donald Trump ordered the contract placed on hold again for Defense Secretary Mark Esper to investigate complaints of favoritism towards Amazon. In October 2019, it was announced that the contract was awarded to Microsoft. Media has noted Trump's dislike towards Amazon's founder, Jeff Bezos, owner of the Washington Post, a newspaper critical of Trump. According to Bezos, Trump "used his power to 'screw Amazon' out of the JEDI Contract". The JEDI contract was awarded to Microsoft on October 25, 2019, the DoD announced, but AWS filed documents with the Court of Federal Claims on November 22, 2019 challenging the award; its legal strategy included calling Trump to testify.

A federal judge, Patricia Campbell-Smith, halted Microsoft's work on the project on February 13, 2020, a day before the system was scheduled to go live, awaiting a resolution in Amazon's suit. She said that Amazon's claims are reasonable and "is likely to succeed on the merits of its argument that the DOD improperly evaluated" Microsoft's offer. As a result, the DOD was forced by a federal judge to reopen bidding for the contract. In the wake of that reopening, Amazon has filed additional protests related to modifications which have been made to selected sections of the contract. Recent DOD legal filings have stated that the final award of the contract cannot take place until at least August 17, and may yet be delayed beyond that date as well. On September 4, 2020, the Department of Defense reaffirmed that Microsoft won the JEDI Cloud contract after the reevaluation of the proposal, stating that Microsoft's proposal continues to represent the best value to the government. DISA/CCPO (Defense Information Systems Agency/Cloud Computing Program Office) had not yet begun work, as of May 29, 2021, while Microsoft continued to mark time before an implementation. In the meantime the several departments (Army, Navy, Air Force) are using their previous infrastructures to meet their several internal timelines, respectively.

== Cancellation and JWCC ==
The JEDI contract with Microsoft was cancelled on July 6, 2021 with the expectation that a new program called "Joint Warfighter Cloud Capability" (JWCC) would replace it, which would involve services from multiple vendors. On November 19, 2021 the Department of Defense issued formal solicitations to four of the original JEDI companies: Amazon, Google, Microsoft and Oracle; notably not including the fifth provider consulted, IBM. On December 7, 2022, the JWCC contract was awarded to the four companies for a combined total of up to $9 billion under the program.
