= Harry E. Wood =

Judge of the U.S. Court of Federal Claims

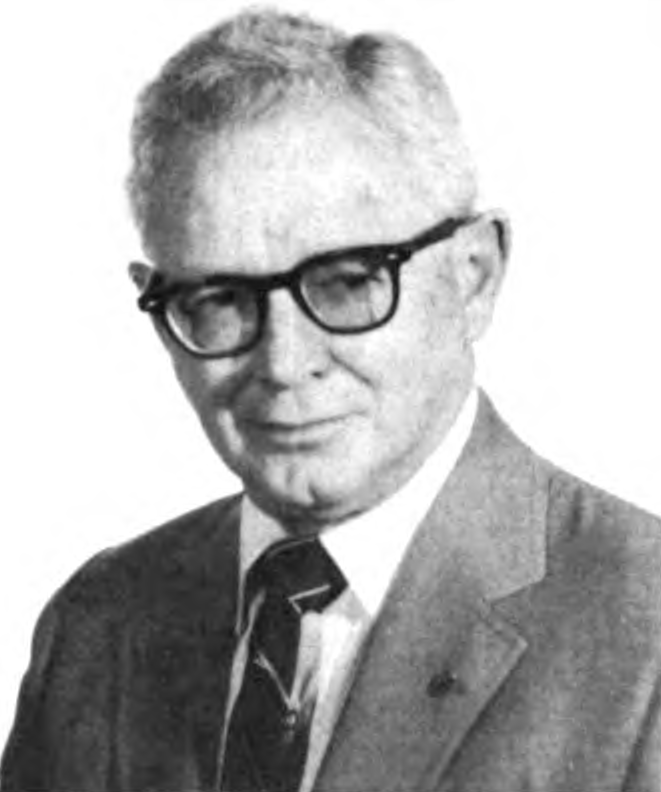

Judge of the United States Court of Federal Claims
- In office October 1, 1982 – April 20, 1986
- Appointed by: operation of law
- Preceded by: seat established
- Succeeded by: Eric G. Bruggink

Personal details
- Born: May 31, 1926 Spartanburg, South Carolina, U.S.
- Died: November 23, 2009 (aged 83)
- Education: George Washington University (AA, (JD)

Harry Eugene Wood (May 31, 1926 – November 23, 2009) was a judge of the United States Court of Claims from 1969 to 1982, and on the United States Court of Federal Claims from 1982 to 1986.

== Early life, education, and career ==
Wood was born in Spartanburg, South Carolina. He served in the United States Army during World War II, from 1944 to 1946. He received an Associate of Arts from George Washington University in 1949, and a Juris Doctor from the George Washington University Law School in 1952, where he was a member of the Order of the Coif and the Delta Theta Phi legal fraternity. He then served as a law clerk for the United States Court of Claims from 1952 to 1954, before entering private practice in Washington, D.C., from 1954 to 1969. From 1959 to 1986, he was also a United States Army Reserve member of the JAG Corps, achieving the rank of colonel.

=== Claims court service ===
In 1969, Wood became a trial judge of the United States Court of Claims. On October 1, 1982, he was reassigned by operation of law to the newly formed United States Claims Court (which later became the United States Court of Federal Claims). He assumed senior status on April 20, 1986, and resigned from the court entirely on July 31, 1986.

== Personal life ==
Wood married Katherine Terrell on August 23, 1947.
