= Lawrence J. Block =

American judge (1951–2025)

Lawrence Block
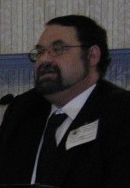
- Block in 2003

Judge of the United States Court of Federal Claims
- In office October 3, 2002 – January 8, 2016
- Appointed by: George W. Bush
- Preceded by: Eric G. Bruggink
- Succeeded by: Edward H. Meyers

Personal details
- Born: March 15, 1951 (age 74) New York City, New York, U.S.
- Died: October 14, 2025 (aged 74)
- Education: New York University (BS); John Marshall Law School (JD)

Lawrence J. Block (March 15, 1951 – October 14, 2025) was a judge of the United States Court of Federal Claims who was confirmed on October 2, 2002. He retired on January 8, 2016.

== Education and career ==
Block was born on March 15, 1951. He received a Bachelor of Science degree from New York University in 1973, graduating magna cum laude. He received his Juris Doctor degree from The John Marshall Law School in 1982, and after law school he clerked for Judge Roger Miner of the United States District Court for the Northern District of New York. He served as an adjunct professor at the George Mason University School of Law from 1990 to 1991.

From 1983 to 1986, Block was an associate with the New York office of Skadden, Arps, Slate, Meagher & Flom, where his substantive areas of practice included constitutional claims involving Commerce Clause and Commercial Speech issues, financial services litigation, as well as merger and acquisition, securities, labor and administrative law litigation.

From 1986 to 1990, Block was an attorney in the U.S. Department of Justice. Block started out as a litigation attorney in the Department's Commercial Litigation Branch, and then from 1987 to 1990, Block served as senior attorney-advisor in the Office of Legal Policy and Policy Development, where he specialized in constitutional law, particularly in the areas of federalism, takings law, separation of powers, presidential power and foreign affairs issues. He also worked extensively on regulatory and environmental issues, particularly with the White House on the Bush Administration's Clean Air Act proposal.

From 1994 to 2002, Block served as senior counsel to the Senate Judiciary Committee, where he worked on a number of significant issues including property rights legislation, punitive damages and class action court reform bills, the cost-benefit analysis regulatory reform act, tobacco policy, litigation and arbitration policy, and First Amendment, privacy and attendant constitutional issues arising out of high technology legislation and governmental programs.

=== Claims court service ===
Block was nominated by George W. Bush on September 4, 2001, to a seat vacated by Eric G. Bruggink on the United States Court of Federal Claims. He was confirmed by the United States Senate on October 2, 2002, and received commission on October 3, 2002. He retired from active service on January 8, 2016.

== Personal life ==
Born in New York City, and a resident of Connecticut and New Jersey, Block has resided in Alexandria, Virginia, over the last sixteen years. Judge Block died on October 14, 2025.

Legal offices
Preceded by Eric G. Bruggink	Judge of the United States Court of Federal Claims; 2002–2016	Succeeded by Edward H. Meyers
