= Jurassic World Camp Cretaceous =

American animated television series

- Genre: Science fiction; Action-adventure
- Based on: Jurassic Park by Michael Crichton
- Developed by: Zack Stentz
- Showrunners: Scott Kreamer; Aaron Hammersley
- Directed by: Lane Lueras; Dan Riba; Zesung Kang; Michael Mullen; Eric Elrod; Leah Artwick
- Voices of: Paul-Mikél Williams; Sean Giambrone; Kausar Mohammed; Jenna Ortega; Ryan Potter; Raini Rodriguez
- Theme music composer: John Williams; Michael Giacchino
- Composer: Leo Birenberg
- Country of origin: United States
- Original language: English
- No. of seasons: 5
- No. of episodes: 50 (list of episodes)

Production
- Executive producers: Lane Lueras; Scott Kreamer; Steven Spielberg; Colin Trevorrow; Frank Marshall
- Running time: 22–24 minutes
- Production companies: Amblin Entertainment; Universal Television; DreamWorks Animation Television

Original release
- Network: Netflix
- Release: September 18, 2020 – November 15, 2022

Related
- Jurassic World: Chaos Theory

Jurassic World Camp Cretaceous is an American animated science fiction television series developed by Zack Stentz for Netflix. Produced by Amblin Entertainment, Universal Television, and DreamWorks Animation Television, it is the first television series in the Jurassic Park franchise. It is set before, during, and after the events of the film Jurassic World (2015) and later during the events of its sequel, Jurassic World: Fallen Kingdom (2018). Aaron Hammersley and Scott Kreamer serve as showrunners and executive produce the series along with Lane Lueras, Steven Spielberg, Colin Trevorrow, and Frank Marshall. The main cast features the voices of Paul-Mikél Williams, Sean Giambrone, Kausar Mohammed, Jenna Ortega, Ryan Potter, and Raini Rodriguez as a group of teenage campers who become stranded on Isla Nublar after multiple dinosaurs escape their habitats.

The first season premiered on September 18, 2020. In 2021, a second season was released on January 22; a third on May 21; and a fourth season on December 3. A fifth and final season premiered on July 21, 2022. A standalone interactive special titled Hidden Adventure was released on November 15, 2022. The series received generally positive reviews for its animation, characters, and voice cast, though responses to its character designs and writing were mixed. At the 48th Annie Awards, the series won the award for Outstanding Achievement for Animated Effects.

A sequel series, Jurassic World: Chaos Theory, premiered on May 24, 2024, on Netflix, and concluded on November 20, 2025.

== Premise ==
After completing a Jurassic World video game, dinosaur fanatic Darius Bowman is invited to visit Camp Cretaceous, an exclusive dinosaur-themed adventure camp on Isla Nublar. Once there, Darius meets the other campers—Kenji, Brooklynn, Yaz, Ben, and Sammy—who were also chosen for the once-in-a-lifetime experience. However, when the dinosaurs break free from their habitats, (Note: As depicted in Jurassic World (2015).) the campers become stranded and are forced to venture across the island without any help in the hopes of finding a way out alive.

== Voice cast and characters ==
Character	Voiced by	Season					
Character	Voiced by	1	2	3	4	5	Special
Main
Darius Bowman	Paul-Mikél Williams	Main	Main	Main	Main	Main	Main
Ben Pincus	Sean Giambrone	Main	Main	Main	Main	Main	Main
Yasmina "Yaz" Fadoula	Kausar Mohammed	Main	Main	Main	Main	Main	Main
Brooklynn	Jenna Ortega	Main	Main	Main	Main	Main	Main
Kenji Kon	Ryan Potter	Main	Main	Main	Main	Main	Main
Sammy Gutierrez	Raini Rodriguez	Main	Main	Main	Main	Main	Main
Recurring and guest
Roxie	Jameela Jamil	Recurring	Guest			Recurring	
Dave	Glen Powell	Recurring	Guest			Recurring	
Tiff	Stephanie Beatriz		Recurring	Archive			
Hap	Angus Sampson		Recurring				
Mitch	Bradley Whitford		Recurring				
Dr. Henry Wu	Greg Chun	Guest		Recurring			
Dr. Mae Turner	Kirby Howell-Baptiste				Recurring	Recurring	
Kash D. Langford	Haley Joel Osment				Recurring	Recurring	
Brandon Bowman	Benjamin Flores Jr.	Guest			Guest	Recurring	
Hawkes	Dave B. Mitchell			Guest		Recurring	
Reed	Dave B. Mitchell			Guest			
Daniel Kon	Andrew Kishino				Guest	Recurring	
Lana Molina	Avrielle Corti					Recurring	
Mr. DNA	Jeff Bergman	Guest					Guest
Eddie	James Arnold Taylor	Guest		Archive			
Fredrick Bowman	Keston John	Guest	Guest				
Dawson	Keston John			Guest			
Mr. Gold	Okieriete Onaodowan					Guest	
Cyrus	Jon Rudnitsky					Guest	
Lewis Dodgson	Adam Harrington					Guest	
The Twins	Mikey Kelley					Guest	
Godinez	Antonio Alvarez					Guest	
Hal Brimford	Bill Nye						Guest

=== Main ===
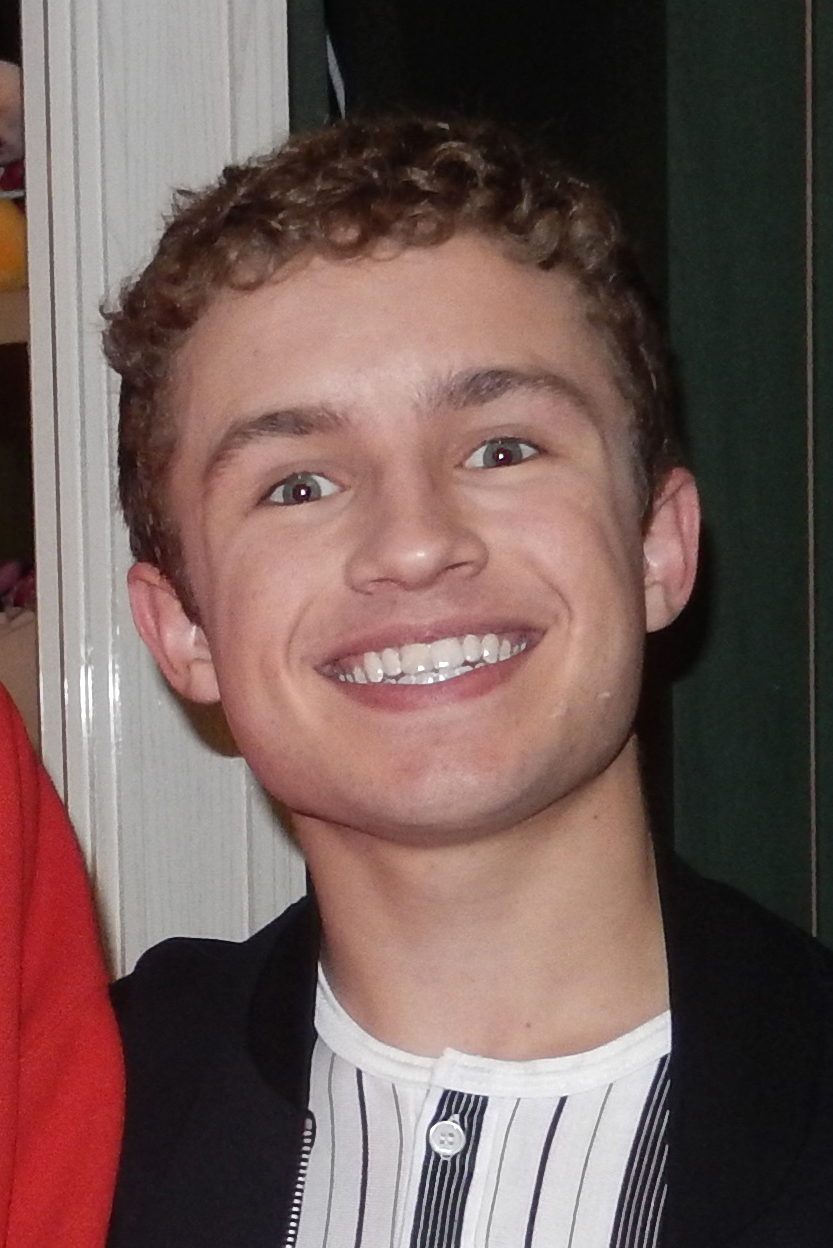
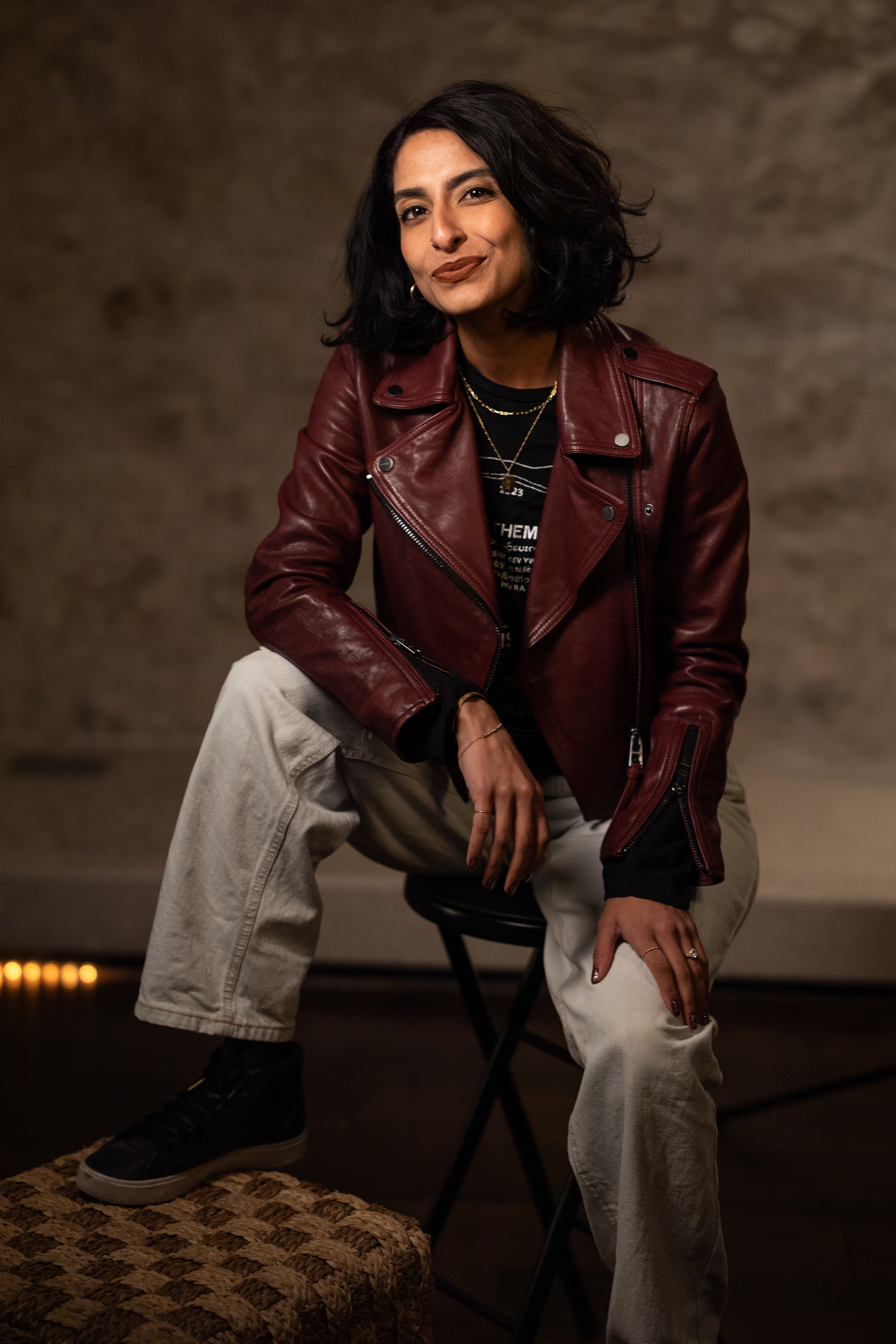
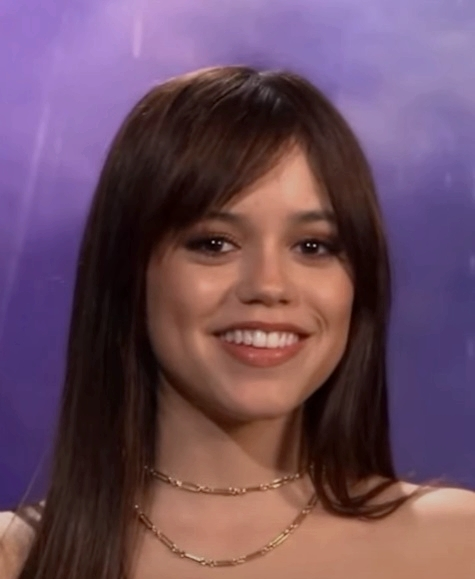
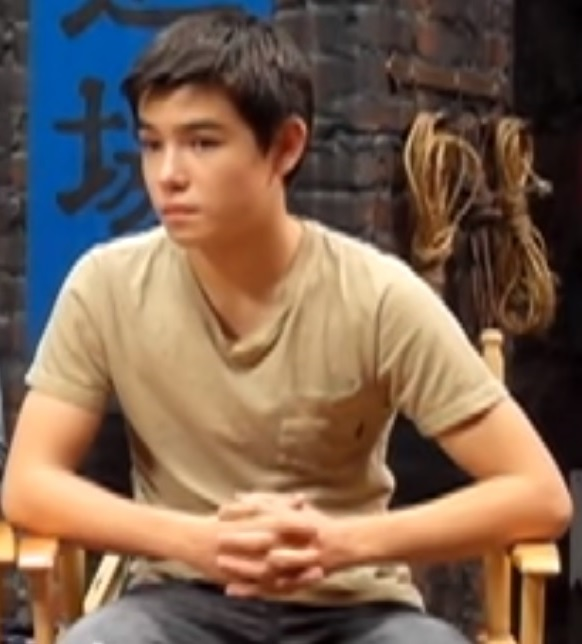
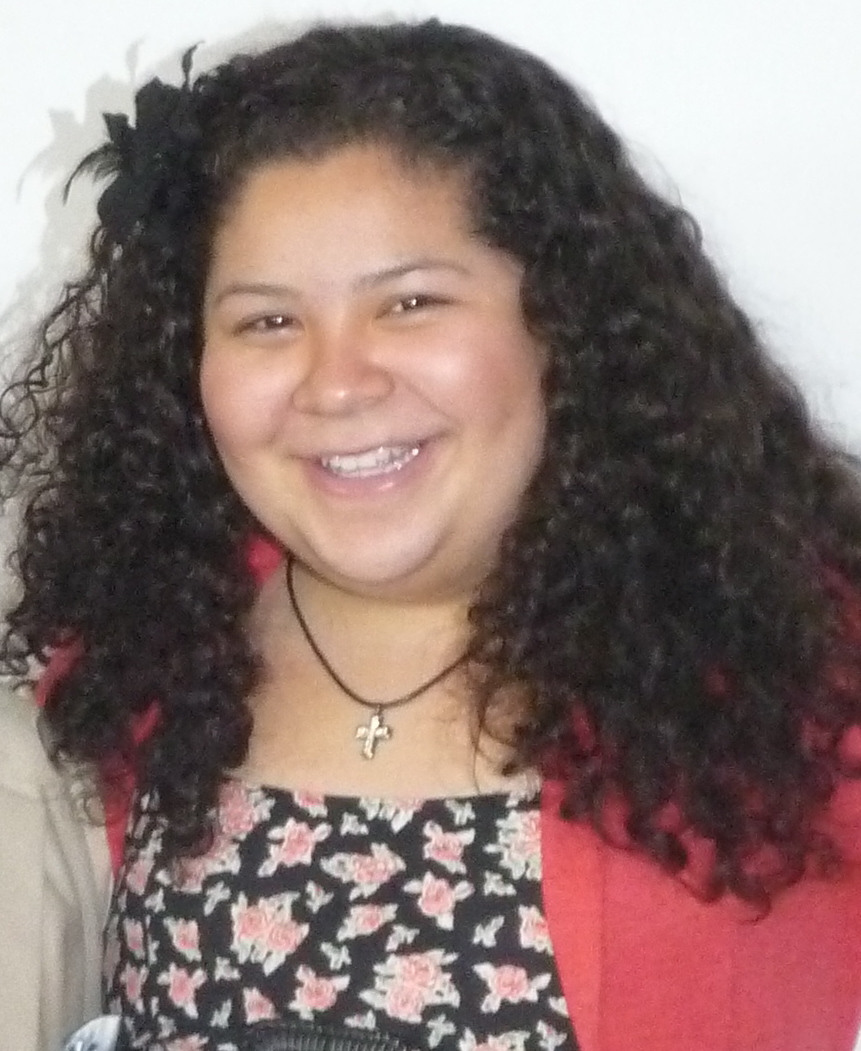
Main cast members Sean Giambrone (Ben), Kausar Mohammed (Yaz), Jenna Ortega (Brooklynn), Ryan Potter (Kenji), and Raini Rodriguez (Sammy)
- Paul-Mikél Williams as Darius Bowman, a camper who is a dinosaur fanatic from Oakland and acts as the leader of the group.
- Sean Giambrone as Ben Pincus, a sensitive and shy camper who takes care of an Ankylosaurus he names Bumpy.
- Kausar Mohammed as Yasmina "Yaz" Fadoula, the "most athletically assured" of the campers who later begins a relationship with Sammy.
- Jenna Ortega as Brooklynn, a pink-haired famous travel vlogger and camper who later begins a relationship with Kenji.
- Ryan Potter as Kenji Kon, a self-appointed VIP camper described as the "self-proclaimed alpha male of the group".
- Raini Rodriguez as Sammy Gutierrez, a camper filled with enthusiasm for the experience of being at Camp Cretaceous.

=== Recurring ===
- Jameela Jamil as Roxie (seasons 1, 5; guest season 2), a paleontologist and camp counselor at Camp Cretaceous.
- Glen Powell as Dave (seasons 1, 5; guest season 2), a paleontologist and camp counselor at Camp Cretaceous.
- Stephanie Beatriz as Tiff (season 2), Mitch's wife and a big-game hunter.
- Angus Sampson as Hap (season 2), a mysterious and brooding tour guide who works for Tiff and Mitch.
- Bradley Whitford as Mitch (season 2), Tiff's husband and a big-game hunter.
- Greg Chun as Dr. Henry Wu (season 3; guest season 1), InGen's chief genetic engineer who re-created the dinosaurs.
- Kirby Howell-Baptiste as Dr. Mae Turner (seasons 4–5), a behavioural paleoneurobiologist contracted by Mantah Corp.
- Haley Joel Osment as Kash D. Langford (seasons 4–5), a roboticist and senior employee of Mantah Corp.
- Benjamin Flores Jr. as Brandon Bowman (season 5; guest seasons 1, 4), Darius' older brother.
- Dave B. Mitchell as Hawkes (season 5; guest season 3), the lead mercenary hired to protect Dr. Wu. He is also later hired by Mantah Corp.
  - Mitchell also voices Reed (guest season 3), one of the mercenaries hired to protect Dr. Wu.
- Andrew Kishino as Daniel Kon (season 5; guest season 4), Kenji's father and the president of Mantah Corp.
- Avrielle Corti as Lana Molina (season 5), an investor in Mantah Corp who works for Biosyn.

=== Guest ===
- Jeff Bergman as Mr. DNA (season 1 and Hidden Adventure), the animated mascot of Jurassic World.
  - Bergman also voices an unnamed worker in the Raptor Paddock (Hidden Adventure)
- James Arnold Taylor as Eddie (season 1), one of Dr. Wu's assistants who had his birthday interrupted by the escape of the dinosaurs.
- Keston John as Fredrick Bowman (seasons 1–2), Darius and Brandon's deceased father who appears in flashbacks.
  - John also voices Dawson (season 3), one of the mercenaries hired to protect Dr. Wu.
- Okieriete Onaodowan as Mr. Gold (season 5), an investor in Mantah Corp.
- Jon Rudnitsky as Cyrus (season 5), an investor in Mantah Corp.
- Adam Harrington as Lewis Dodgson (season 5), the head of research at Biosyn.
- Mikey Kelley as The Twins (season 5), twin brothers who are mercenaries hired by Mantah Corp.
- Antonio Alvarez as Godinez (season 5), a mercenary hired by Mantah Corp.
- Bill Nye as Hal Brimford (Hidden Adventure), a former employee of Jurassic World who left a message for Owen Grady that leads to the Hidden Adventure, an amusement park on Isla Nublar that never opened.

Additionally, Secunda Wood voices the various computer systems on both Isla Nubla and Mantah Corp Island and Roger Craig Smith voices the B.R.A.D. / B.R.A.D.-X. robots, which are mass-produced Bio-Robotic Assistance Droids used by Mantah Corp. Cherise Boothe voices an unnamed pilot working for Dr. Wu, Chris Jai Alex voices an unnamed worker in the raptor paddock in Hidden Adventure and Hansen, one of the mercenaries hired by Dr. Wu, does not have a credited voice actor.

Several notable creatures from the movie franchise make an appearance. This includes the Tyrannosaurus rex Rexy from Jurassic Park, the quartet of Velociraptors Blue, Charlie, Delta and Echo, the Indominus rex, and the Mosasaurus, all from Jurassic World, and the Spinosaurus, named "Asset 87", from Jurassic Park III.
Other notable dinosaurs that appear include Bumpy, an Ankylosaurus with an asymmetrical face who befriends Ben Pincus; Toro, a Carnotaurus that hunts the campers; Grim, Chaos and Limbo, a trio of Baryonyx; Maria, a Sinoceratops freed from its cage by Sammy; the Scorpios rex, the first hybrid dinosaur created by Dr. Henry Wu; Big Eatie and Little Eatie, a mother and daughter pair of Tyrannosaurus rex; Pierce, a Kentrosaurus cared for by Mae Turner; Angel and Rebel, a pair of young Spinoceratops (Sinoceratops-Spinosaurus hybrids), and Firecracker, a baby Brachiosaurus. The series also introduces the first on-screen prehistoric mammal in the Jurassic Park franchise, a Smilodon in the fourth season, and the marine reptile Nothosaurus in the fifth season.

== Episodes ==
Season	Episodes	Originally released
1	8	September 18, 2020
2	8	January 22, 2021
3	10	May 21, 2021
4	11	December 3, 2021
5	12	July 21, 2022
Special		November 15, 2022

== Production ==
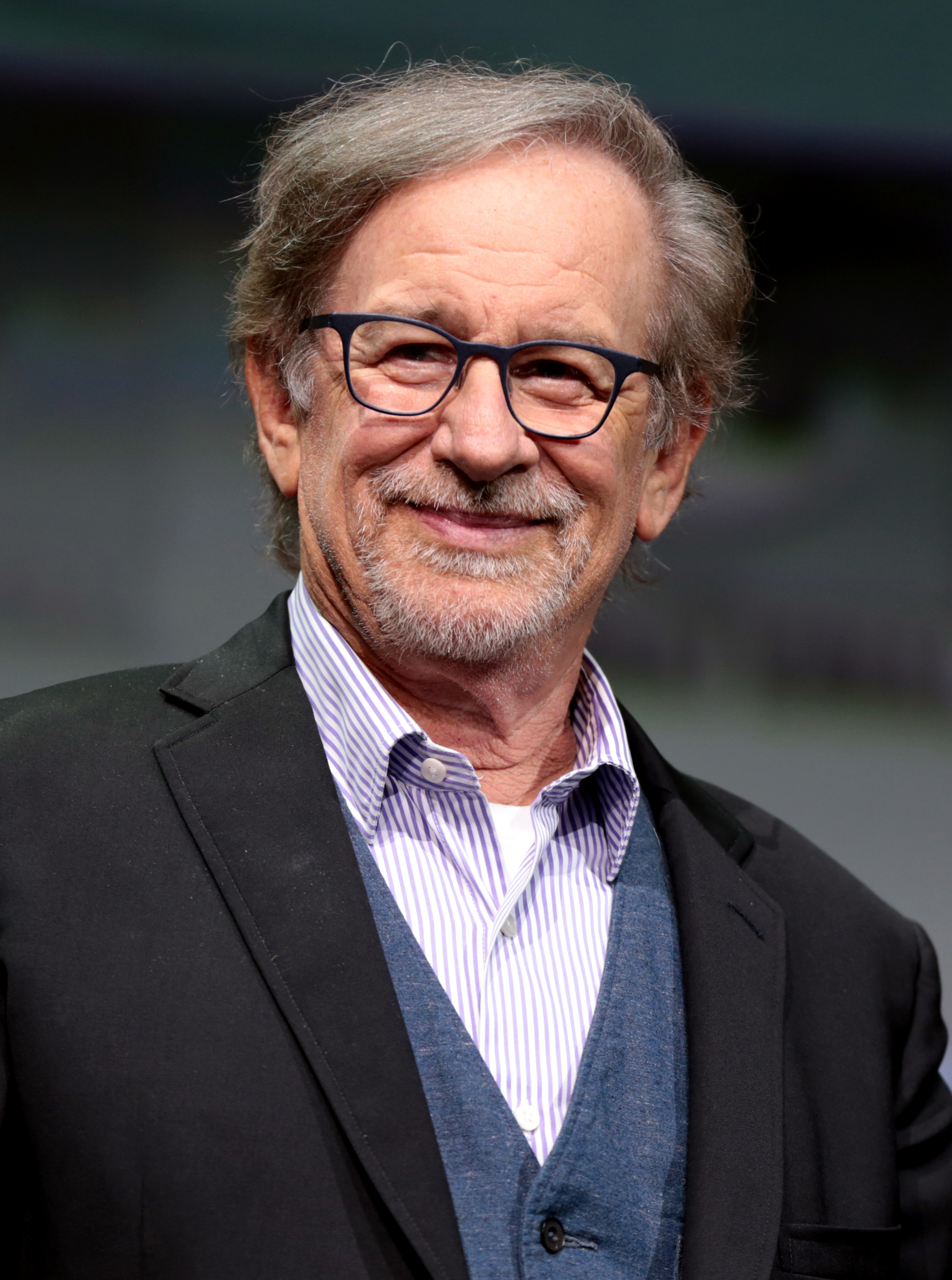
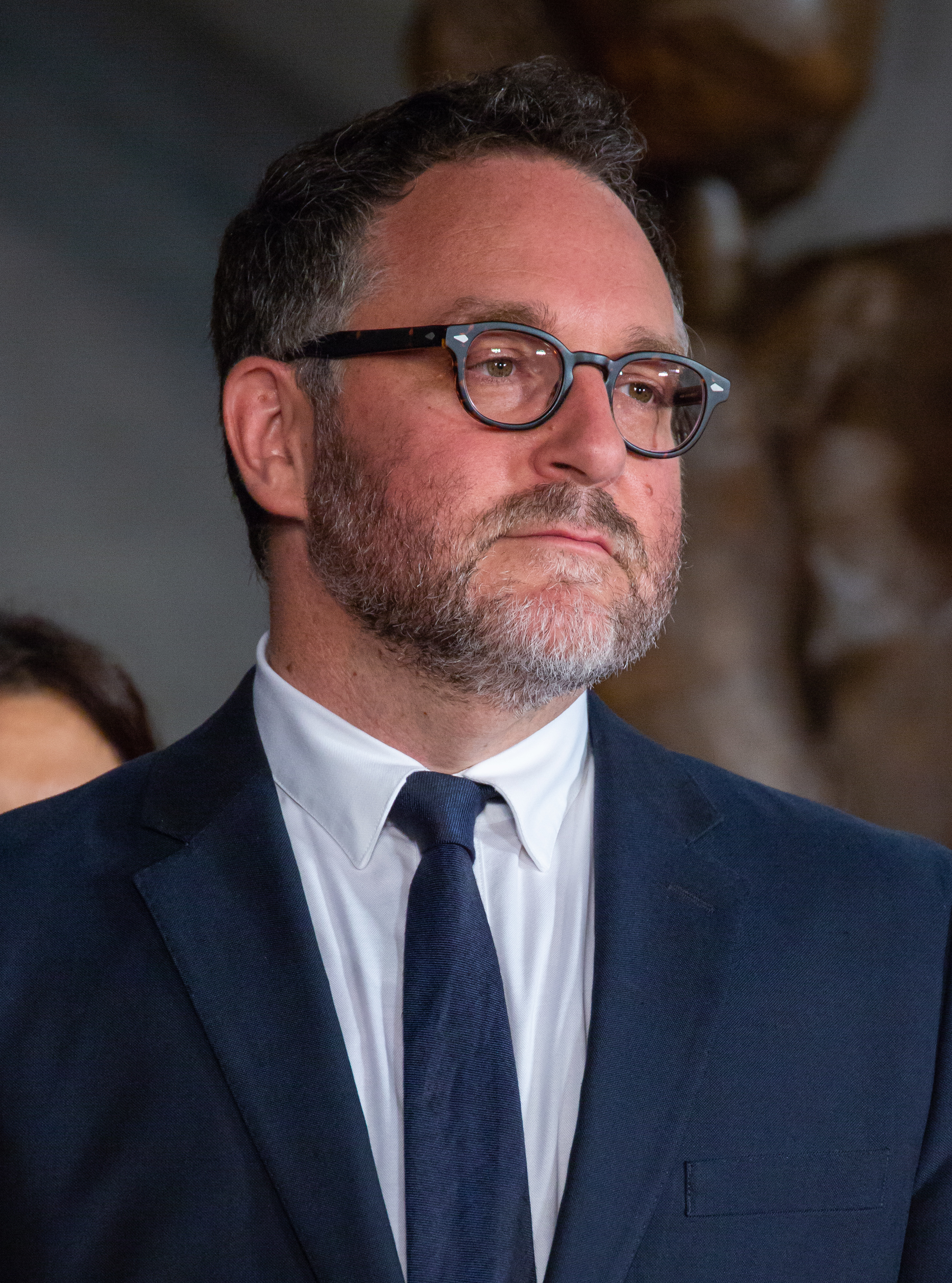
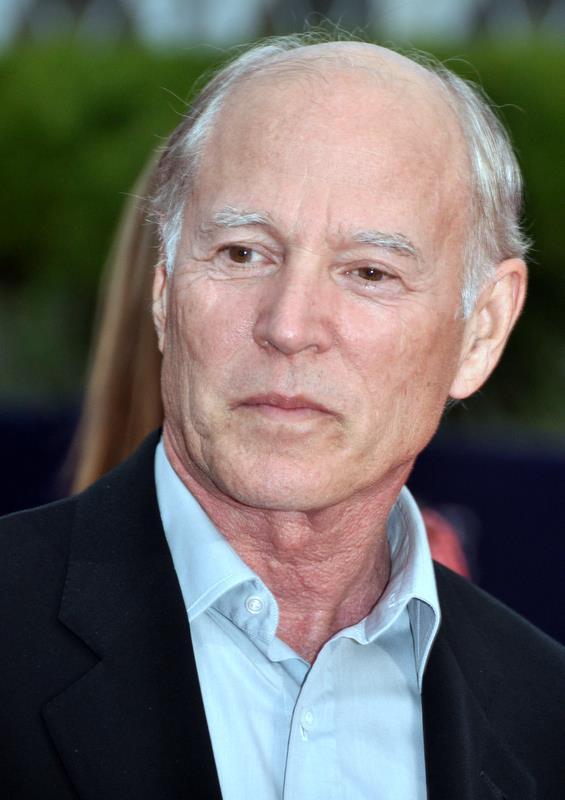
(From left to right): Executive producers Steven Spielberg, Colin Trevorrow, and Frank Marshall

According to series developer and consulting producer Zack Stentz, who also pitched the idea for the series to Universal Pictures, production on Jurassic World Camp Cretaceous began as early as April 2017. In June 2018, Scott Kreamer took over a premise and pilot script written by Stentz and worked on the show's early design. In 2019, an animated series was announced to debut on Netflix the following year, to be set during the events of the 2015 film Jurassic World. A joint project between Netflix, Universal Pictures, Amblin Entertainment, and DreamWorks Animation, Scott Kreamer and Aaron Hammersley worked together as the series' showrunners, executive-producing the series along with Lane Lueras, Steven Spielberg, Colin Trevorrow, and Frank Marshall.

Spielberg did not want the series to be a "kiddy version" of the Jurassic Park films, insisting that the young characters be placed in dangerous scenarios, as in the films. Kreamer and Hammersley joined the project after it was greenlit and they shared Spielberg's vision. The three were inspired by various Spielberg films which often depicted children facing danger. Unlike the Jurassic Park films, where children are secondary characters rescued by adults, the series focuses instead on the teenagers and their efforts to survive on their own. While working, crew members watched the film Jurassic World several times to develop tie-ins between the film and the show, even creating a map of Isla Nublar to help with the process.

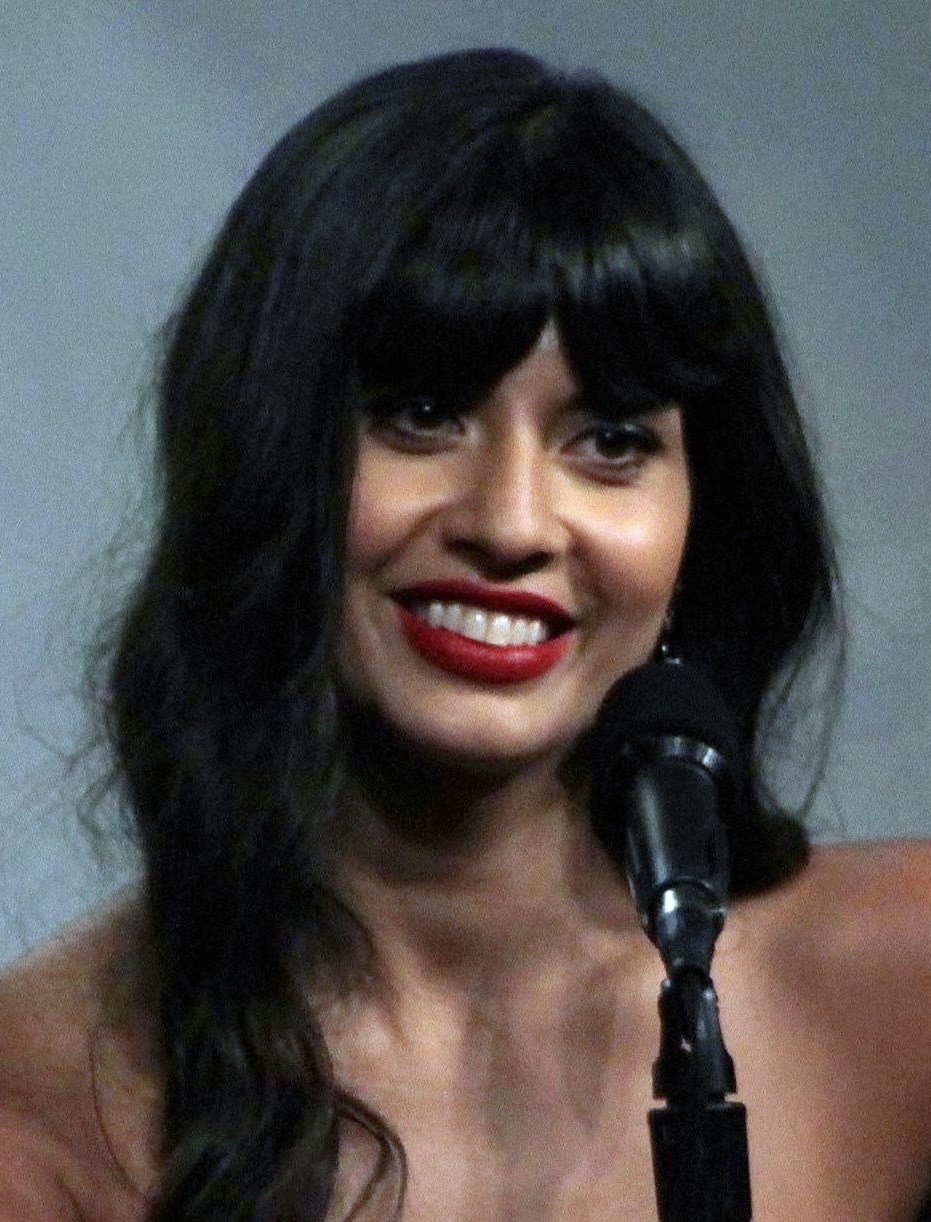
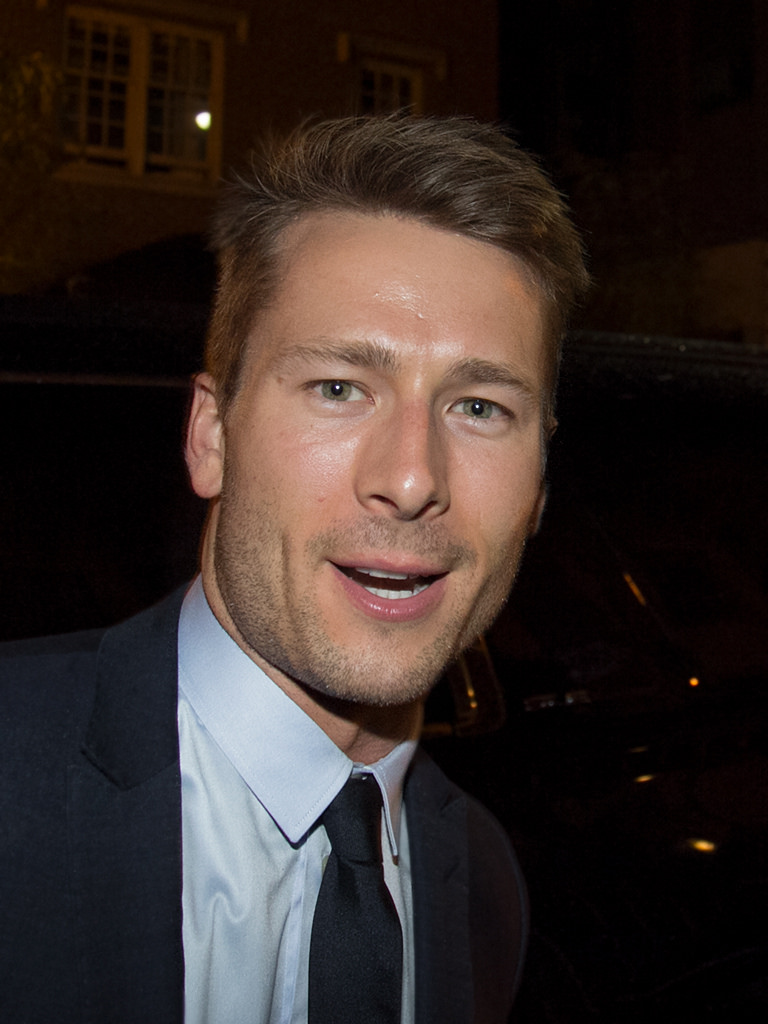
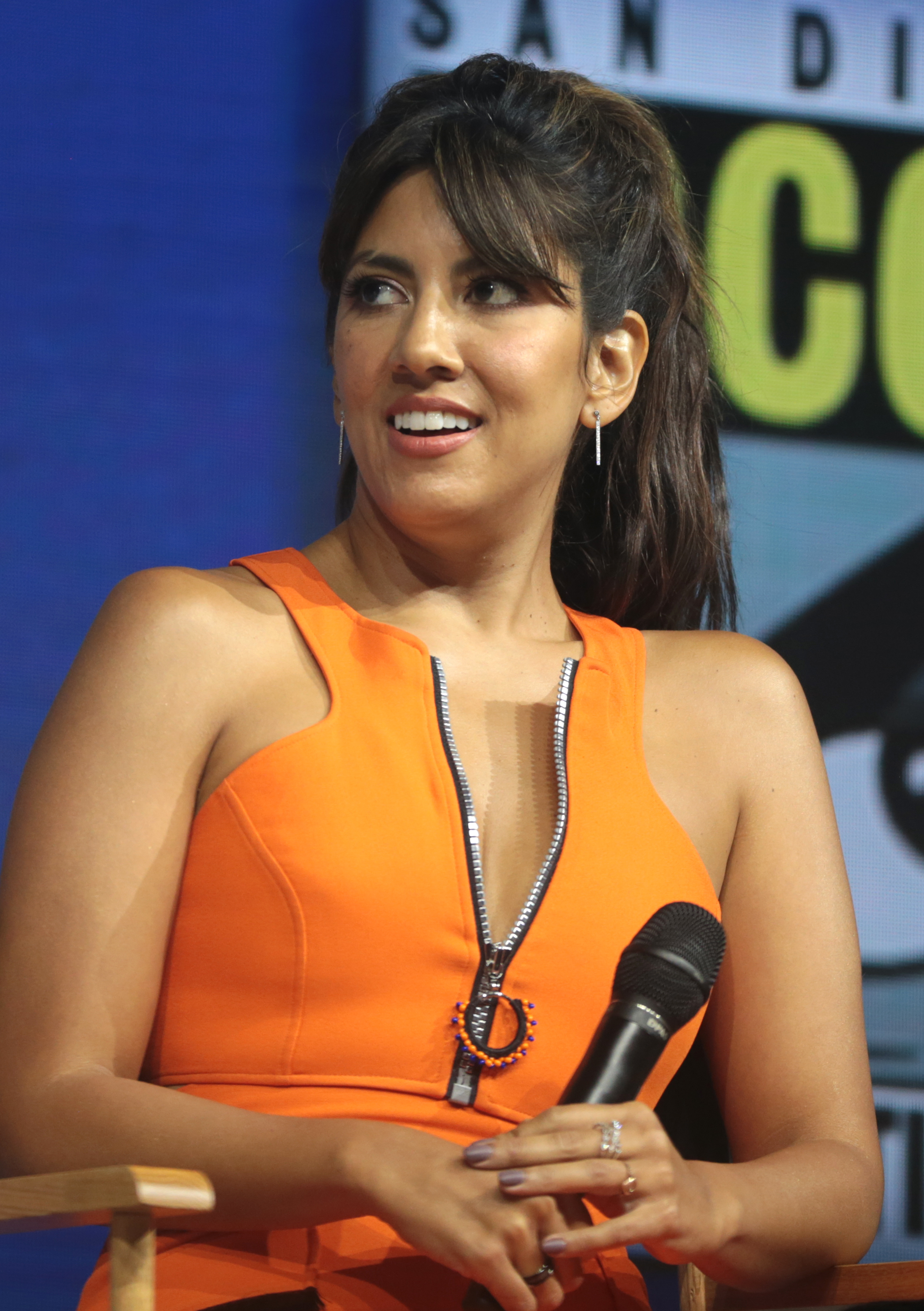
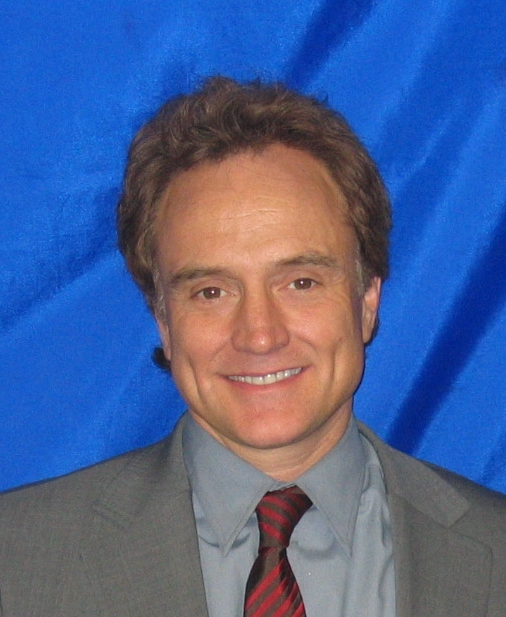
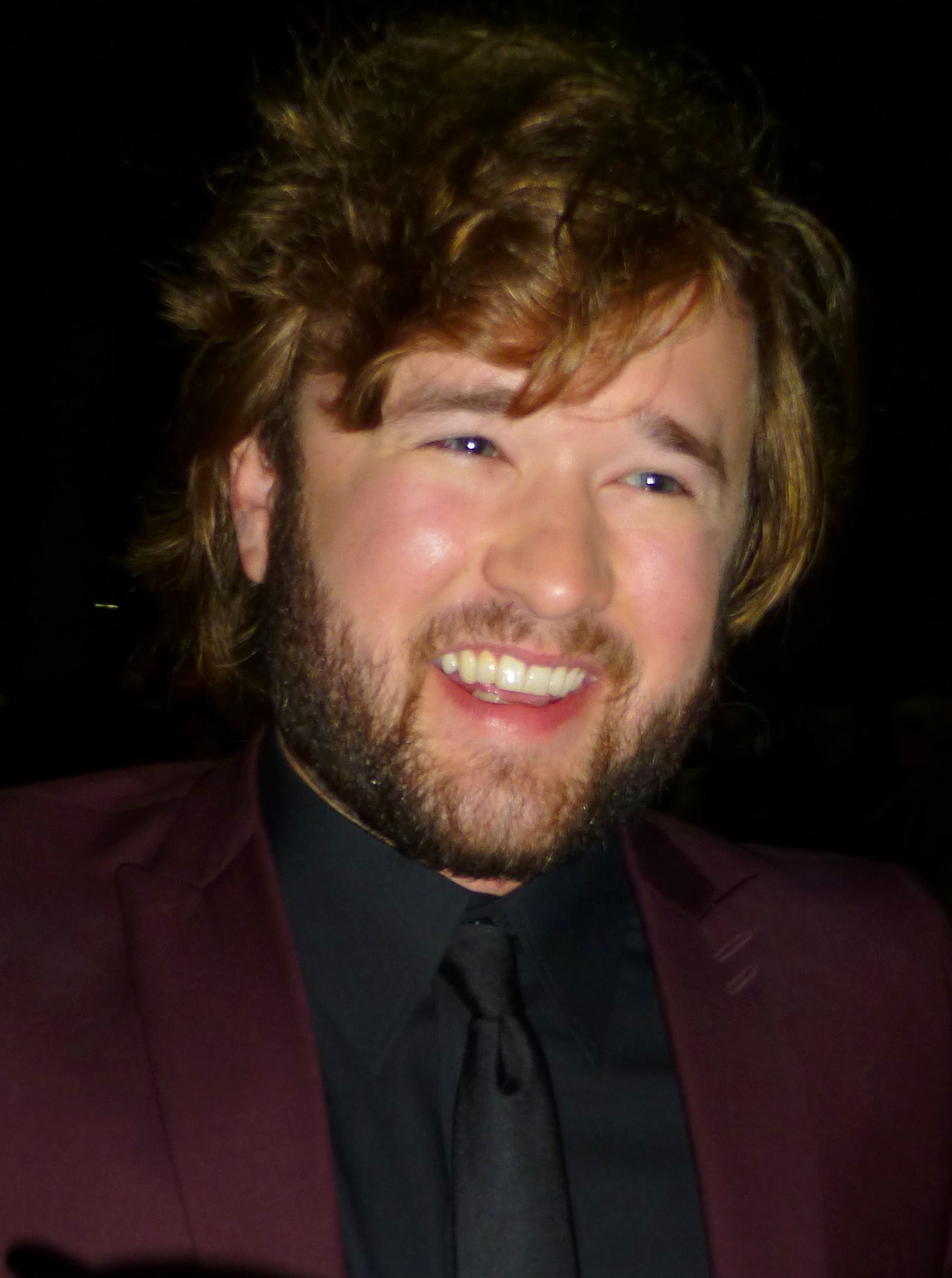
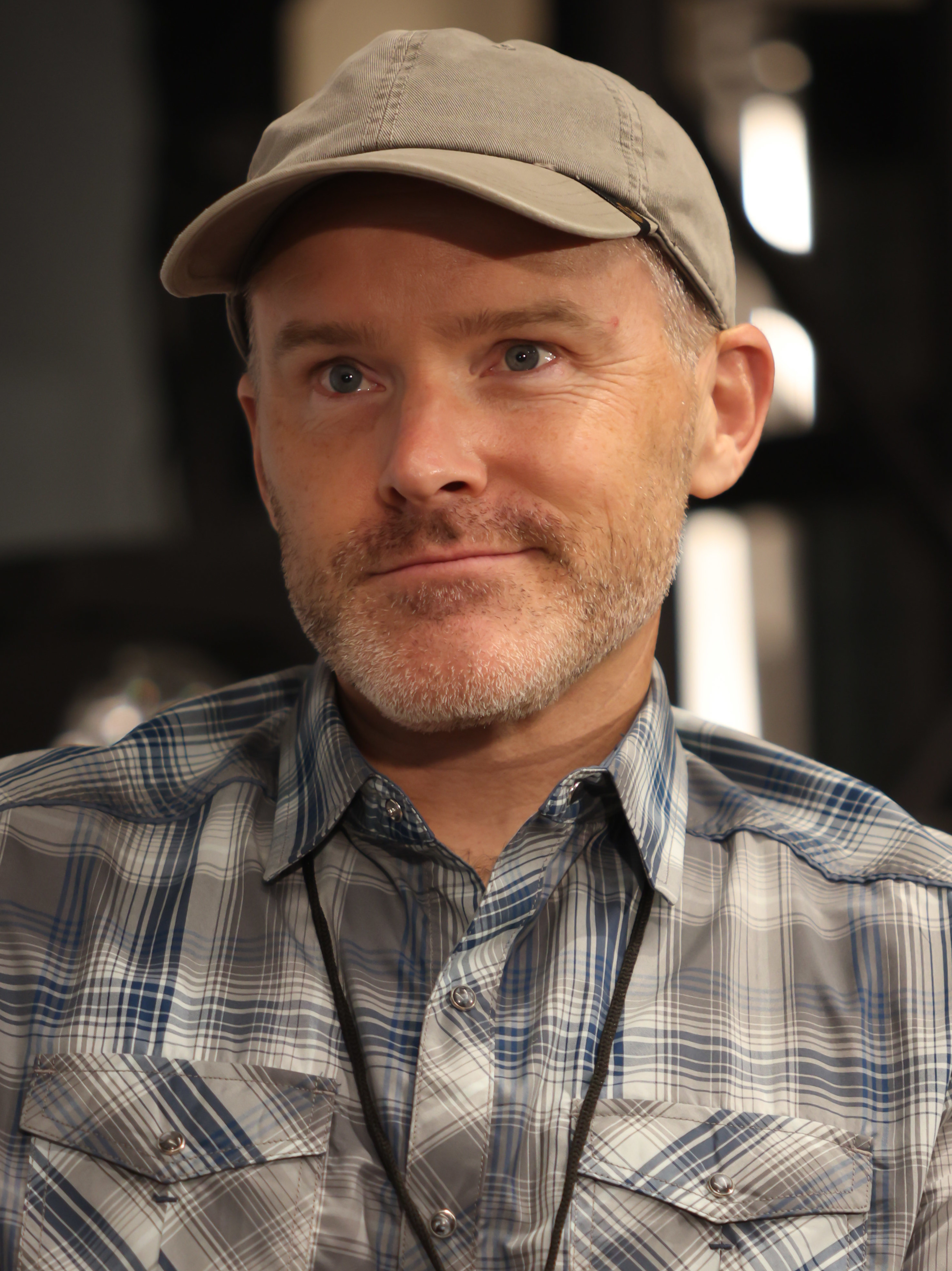
Recurring voice actors include Jameela Jamil and Glen Powell as Roxie and Dave in the first and fifth seasons, Stephanie Beatriz and Bradley Whitford as Tiff and Mitch in the second, and Haley Joel Osment and Roger Craig Smith as Kash and B.R.A.D. in the fourth and fifth.

According to staff writer Sheela Shrinivas and story editor Josie Campbell, the hardest characters to develop for the show were Yaz and Brooklynn. The writers struggled to find ways to make the characters "likable" to viewers. However, they ultimately decided that the best thing to do would be to bring out the character's weaknesses to have viewers sympathize with each character. The role of Dave was written specifically for Glen Powell, which he said made voicing the character "easy and fun".

While executive producing, Trevorrow said he had two rules he told the show's crew: to treat the dinosaurs as actual animals when creating a story, and to avoid animating aerial shots to keep scenes "grounded". Programs such as V-Ray, Autodesk Maya, and Nuke were used to create the series. The COVID-19 pandemic began during production, and the series crew had to work from home. (Note: In May 2021, Sean Giambrone told Screen Rant that the voice recordings for the third season had taken place before the pandemic.)

The series also features original music composed by Leo Birenberg, using themes from the Jurassic Park and Jurassic World soundtracks, composed by John Williams and Michael Giacchino respectively. In an interview, Birenberg said that he first heard of the show from music executives Alex Nixon and Frank Garcia, who he had previously collaborated with on Kung Fu Panda: The Paws of Destiny, after being recommended by Giacchino, who he had already met.

The second season was released on January 22, 2021. Early drafts for the season considered having the character of Ben die shortly after his fall in the first season's finale, but these plans were abandoned and Ben survived to continue appearing in the series. Colin Trevorrow attended a virtual panel at the 2020 New York Comic Con held in October, in which he said that the show's second season gave the production crew "a lot of freedom", as the first season depended entirely on the context found in Jurassic World, and the second season was set six months before the opening sequence in Fallen Kingdom.

In an interview, Trevorrow told Comic Book Resources that the appearance of animal trafficking in Fallen Kingdom encouraged the writers of Camp Cretaceous to feature big-game hunting as a major plot point of the show's second season to teach children that these problems still existed. When asked about the series' future, Trevorrow told Screen Rant that the crew at Camp Cretaceous had a story already planned out that would "take these kids deeper into a journey that pulls further and further away from Jurassic World".

A ten-episode third season was released on May 21, 2021. During development of the season, Kreamer said that they "wanted the kids to have their own agency and put their fate in their own hands [...] we wanted to take some time and do some cool stuff, and have some fun, and do things that we hadn't done before because there was no time to do it because the kids were always running for their lives". When asked about transferring the animated series into the live-action Jurassic World universe, he responded by saying: "I would never say never. As far as I know, there are no immediate plans for that to happen but it would be pretty cool if it did". Along with Kreamer and Raini Rodriguez, Trevorrow teased a fourth season: "We do have a beginning, middle, and an end for it. We do [have a plan], and there is an ending in sight. Scott and the writers have plotted out a pretty exciting way forward". Trevorrow explained that the show would not include the volcano eruption scene from Fallen Kingdom and said that "if we are able to tell the whole story that we have plotted out here, that the writers have built, it will really give us a chance to go into some really new spaces that are a real departure from the movies".

A fourth season was released on December 3, 2021. In an interview, Kreamer confirmed the return of the Spinosaurus, a dinosaur first depicted in Jurassic Park III (2001), and said the fourth season would take place on an island "previously unseen in the Jurassic canon". The writers originally thought the B.R.A.Ds were too unrealistic for the series. After watching a video by Boston Dynamics about robots, however, the writers decided to include them. On developing the relationship between Kenji and Brooklynn, Kreamer said the idea was first brought up and dismissed during the making of season two. He added: "It's a kid show and it's not necessarily something you would do in Jurassic. But it felt [like] a natural progression. If you've got six kids on an island for six months, feelings are going to develop. And we wanted to approach it in a way that felt organic to the show and made sense with our characters".

A fifth and final season was released on July 21, 2022.

A standalone interactive special, titled Hidden Adventure, was released on November 15, 2022.

== Home media ==
The first three seasons were released on DVD on May 3, 2022, by Universal Pictures Home Entertainment.

== Reception ==
=== Season 1 ===
On review aggregator Rotten Tomatoes, the first season of Jurassic World Camp Cretaceous holds an approval rating of 77% based on 13 reviews, with an average rating of 6.6/10. The website's critical consensus reads, "With a spirited group of campers and exciting new adventures, Camp Cretaceous successfully evolves the Jurassic World franchise for younger viewers - though it may be a bit too violent for some."

Writing for Bloody Disgusting, Meagan Navarro called the season "the perfect Amblin mix of funny, touching, and daring", praising the voice cast and the dinosaur designs, but calling the character designs generic. Jesse Hassenger from The A.V. Club gave the season a grade rating of a C+, calling the show unrealistic storywise, but also saying that its character development was "clever" and that the show depicted teenagers accurately. Collider's Haleigh Foutch gave the season an A−, while Alana Joli Abbott of Den of Geek gave it four stars out of five. Overall, both critics lauded the animation, cast, and central story of the season. From the Los Angeles Times, Robert Lloyd compared the animation style to that found in the original characters in Scooby-Doo, and complimented the voice acting, stating that it "keeps them real enough". Nick Allen of RogerEbert.com considered the series' entertainment value to be worthy of comparison to the franchise's original trilogy, stating that "because of the care put into making [the series], it's more special than just a spin-off."

In a negative review, Empire journalist Ben Travis gave the season a rating of two stars out of five, criticizing the show's writing and its characters, who he said were "unlikeable" and "drawn in thin stereotypes and forced dialogue", concluding that the first season was only meant for younger viewers. On the other side of the spectrum, Beth Elderkin of io9 found the season to be excessively violent, pointing out that "not an episode goes by without at least one kid being put in mortal danger". However, she noted the consistency throughout the season, stating that "it's rare to find a modern children's show that trusts its audience to handle more intense subject material [...] even if it's unsettling at times". Having watched the first episode, the crew at Decider hesitantly recommended viewers to stream the series.

=== Season 2 ===
On Rotten Tomatoes, the second season holds an approval rating of 100% based on five reviews, with an average rating of 6.8/10. Den of Geek critic Alana Joli Abbott gave the second season of Camp Cretaceous a four and a half out of five star rating, stating that it improved compared to its first, while Daniel Hart from Ready Steady Cut said it did not, giving the season three stars out of five, and calling it a "missed opportunity". Danielle Solzman, from Solzy at the Movies, praised the exploration of the fictional Isla Nublar and the pacing of all eight episodes. Writing for Mashable, Brooke Bajgrowicz complimented the overall story in the season and the growing tension, but criticized the plot of the episode "Brave", which took place entirely in a flashback and only focused on the character of Ben.

From Collider, Haleigh Foutch ranked the season in her list of the top seven "new shows" to watch on Netflix, stating that the new season "leaves plenty of opportunity for action while making room for more character-focused moments". Screen Rant journalist John Orquiola lauded the show's story, action, and characters, specifically in the episode titled "The Watering Hole", stating that it was similar to the ending of the original Jurassic Park, and a "clever spin" on the directing style of Steven Spielberg. Rafael Motamayor, writing for The New York Observer, also shared positive feedback to "The Watering Hole", stating that the episode was "full of wonder" that allowed the show to "capture the feeling of the original Jurassic Park, while bringing the dinosaurs to the forefront of the story."

=== Season 3 ===
The third season of Camp Cretaceous received highly positive reviews from critics, with some calling it the series' best. On Rotten Tomatoes, the third season holds an approval rating of 100% based on 7 reviews, with an average rating of 8.3/10. From ComingSoon.net, Jeff Ames gave it a "9/10" for its character development and wrote that while it continued to use the same formula for its action sequences, "the creators know these characters so well, and have such a firm grip on audience expectations, that they manage to outmaneuver their episodic trappings and deliver a final product that satisfies, thrills, and, best of all, leaves you wanting more." Animation World Network's Victoria Davis also praised the season for its overall tone, noting that "the attention paid to small visuals adds to the heightened emotion by conveying a sense of aging and maturity in the characters." Furthermore, Den of Geek's Alana Joli Abbott gave it four stars and a half out of five for being able to balance "calmer, lighter moments with heart-pounding action, and real concern that favorite characters won't make it out alive", and said that the series was one that children of all ages could enjoy. However, Comic Book Resources's Renaldo Matadeen gave a negative review, finding that the finale "botched" Ben's character development when being separated from Bumpy, writing that "it's underwhelming and destroys the heroic nature he's developed. Ben should have made his own call in a rational and not melodramatic manner, so the next season could move past his screaming and anxious self. By trying to force humor, it just feels regressive and culls the badass leader he was turning into."

=== Season 4 ===
IGN's Amelia Emberwing gave positive notes to Yaz's character development for demonstrating that "even the toughest among us have moments where they need help". However, Emberwing found that for a series aimed at younger audiences, the violence against the dinosaurs was unnecessary; she said a scene in one episode served no purpose to the narrative and was "so pointlessly mean spirited that it warranted pausing and walking away for a moment". In her verdict, the reviewer said the cruelty shown on screen would taint the show's legacy and that the fourth season was a "frustrating hiccup in the story." Meanwhile, Jeff Ames from ComingSoon.net gave the fourth season an 8/10 and said, "it doesn't quite offer the narrative thrust (or intrigue) of previous seasons, but there's plenty to enjoy, even if you're only here to check out the beautifully rendered monsters." Brandon Zachary of Comic Book Resources gave extreme praise. He found the animation and designs to be "impressive" and wrote, "the overall strength of the writing and an ever-impressive voice cast help elevate it even further, making it one of the more genuinely exciting all-ages series on Netflix."

In its opening week, the fourth season of Camp Cretaceous was the seventh most-watched series on Netflix after accumulating a total of 16.9 million hours of watch time. In its second week, the season was watched for a total of 17.42 million hours, placing fourth in Netflix's top ten list for television shows in the English language.

=== Season 5 ===
Upon release of the season, several parents on Common Sense Media gave mostly positive reviews. They expressed some concern over the tone change and focus being shifted more towards the teenagers, but mentioned they and their children still enjoyed the action and adventure.

=== Accolades ===
Award	Date of ceremony	Category	Recipient(s)	Result	Ref.
Annie Awards	April 16, 2021	Outstanding Achievement for Animated Effects in an Animated Television/Broadcast Production	Emad Khalili and Ivan Wang (for "Welcome to Jurassic World")	Won	
Children's and Family Emmy Awards	December 11, 2022	Outstanding Promotional Announcement	Jurassic World Camp Cretaceous (for "Season 3 Launch Campaign")	Nominated	
Children's and Family Emmy Awards	December 16, 2023	Outstanding Promotional Announcement	Jurassic World Camp Cretaceous (for "Season 5 Launch Campaign")	Nominated	
Daytime Emmy Awards	June 25, 2021	Outstanding Daytime Promotional Announcement	Jurassic World Camp Cretaceous (for "Launch Campaign")	Won	
Daytime Emmy Awards	June 25, 2021	Outstanding Individual Achievement in Animation	Zesung Kang	Won	
GLAAD Media Awards	March 30, 2023/May 13, 2023	Outstanding Kids and Family Programming - Animated	Jurassic World Camp Cretaceous	Nominated	
Golden Reel Awards	March 13, 2022	Outstanding Achievement in Sound Editing – Animation Series or Short	Rob McIntyre, Evan Dockter, Marc Schmidt, D.J. Lynch, Anna Adams, Aran Tanchum, Ezra Walker, and Vincent Guisetti (for "Eye of the Storm")	Nominated	
Nickelodeon Kids' Choice Awards	April 9, 2022	Favorite Cartoon	Jurassic World Camp Cretaceous	Nominated	
Nickelodeon Kids' Choice Awards	March 4, 2023	Favorite Animated Show	Jurassic World Camp Cretaceous	Nominated	

== Sequel ==
In November 2023, the sequel series Jurassic World: Chaos Theory was announced at Netflix's Geeked Week virtual event. Set six years after Camp Cretaceous and shortly before the events of Jurassic World Dominion (2022), it features "The Nublar Six" reunite as young adults as they travel across the United States where dinosaurs now roam freely and unravel a vast conspiracy. Returning cast members from Camp Cretaceous include Paul-Mikél Williams, Sean Giambrone, Kausar Mohammed and Raini Rodriguez who reprise their respective roles as Darius Bowman, Ben Pincus, Yasmina "Yaz" Fadoula, and Sammy Gutierrez while the characters of Kenji Kon and Brooklynn were recast.

The series premiered its first season on May 24, 2024, on Netflix and concluded after its fourth and final season premiered on November 20, 2025.

== See also ==
- List of films featuring dinosaurs
