= Brave (Jurassic World Camp Cretaceous) =

- Jurassic World Camp Cretaceous episode
- Ben stands by Bumpy after defeating Toro. The choice of developing and returning the character to the series was seen as a "smart, structural decision" by Colin Trevorrow.
- Episode no.: Season 2 Episode 5
- Directed by: Eric Elrod
- Written by: Lindsay Kerns
- Original air date: January 22, 2021
- Running time: 24 minutes

Episode chronology
← Previous "Salvation"	Next → "Misguided"

"Brave" is the fifth episode of the second season of the American streaming television series Jurassic World Camp Cretaceous, and the thirteenth episode overall. Written by Lindsay Kerns and directed by Eric Elrod, the episode was released on Netflix on January 22, 2021.

The series, which is also referred to as simply Camp Cretaceous, takes place during and after the events of the 2015 film Jurassic World. It follows a group of six teenagers who are left behind on Isla Nublar after various dinosaurs escape their habitats.

"Brave" takes place entirely in a flashback and features the return of Sean Giambrone as the voice of Ben, a character who audiences were led to believe had died in the first season's finale. In its initial release, the episode received mixed reviews from critics, with some criticizing the storytelling techniques used throughout the episode, and others lauding the story that brought back a beloved character.

== Plot ==
Shortly after falling off the monorail train and failing to hold on to the hand of his friend Darius Bowman (Paul-Mikél Williams), a timid Ben Pincus (Sean Giambrone) is snatched up and flown up by two Pteranodons who drop him, making him fall 20 feet down to the ground, knocking him unconscious. The following day, he wakes up to the sight of Bumpy, a young Ankylosaurus who he has been taking care of, and who fends off a pack of Compies who surrounded Ben. Not knowing where the rest of his friends are, Ben concludes that they must have already gotten off the island without him, so he decides to search for the emergency distress beacon located at the island's central hub on Main Street. After finding and failing to cross numerous obstacles, such as a tall tree, a large canyon, a misty forest, and a rough river, Ben and Bumpy find a road leading back to the park. Unfortunately, the pair are chased away by Toro, a Carnotaurus that Ben had encountered previously, having been injured in an explosion by his friends a few days prior. After narrowly managing to escape Toro's attack, Ben and Bumpy end up back where they started, and decide to find a place to rest. Ben makes a temporary shelter while Bumpy helps him find food and water. However, she also takes his shelter for the nights, causing him to spend the nights mostly sleepless and unfocused.

Several days later, a fearful Ben becomes annoyed with reliving the same daily cycle without getting enough sleep, or finding a way off the island. He also gets so angry with Bumpy after she accidentally destroys his shelter and he yells at her in rage, scaring her away. Regretting his actions, Ben begins to search for Bumpy, as a group of Compsognathuses ("Compies") begin to stalk him. During a stormy night, the Compies surround Ben, and he gains the courage and aggression to scare them away. After several weeks of surviving all on his own, Ben forges a spear and gains the courage to fight Toro and make his way off the island. As he fights Toro, he reunites with a now-grown Bumpy, and the two force the carnotaurus off a small cliff, severely injuring him when he breaks his back and part of his pelvis in the fall. After catching a glimpse of smoke from a campfire, Ben investigates and overhears Hap (Angus Sampson), Mitch (Bradley Whitford), and Tiff (Stephanie Beatriz), a trio of big-game hunters Ben's friends have encountered, talking about a secret "plan" to deal with them. This makes Ben realize that his friends are still on the island and he and Bumpy immediately decide to go to their aid.

== Production ==
"We put a lot of love into ['Brave']. Both, the writer, Lindsay Kerns, and our story editor, Josie Campbell really got into that. And then on the art side, the director, Eric Elrod, and especially the other executive producer, Eric Hammersley, really rolled up their sleeves and dug deep into that episode. Even before we started, I knew I wanted to do a survival episode, [as] a departure. Putting as little dialogue in an episode as possible, just really telling a survival story. Ben coming back just lent itself perfectly to that".

— Scott Kreamer

In interviews following the release of the second season of Camp Cretaceous, showrunner Scott Kreamer said that the idea of having an episode focusing entirely on the survival of a single character with little to no dialogue was initially brought up during production of the first season. After Netflix announced a second season in October 2020, DreamWorks Animation revealed that Sean Giambrone would be returning as Ben, a character audiences believed had been presumably killed in the first season's finale.

"Brave", the fifth episode of the second season, was written by Lindsay Kerns and directed by Eric Elrod, with Josie Campbell serving as a story editor, and with Aaron Hammersley and Scott Kreamer working as showrunners. According to Kreamer, an early draft of the episode had Ben die due to injuries caused by the fall, but the crew found the ending "too dark", stating that for a children's show, the death of one of the child characters would have "been pushing it too far". When asked about the season, executive producer Colin Trevorrow said that "Brave" was his favorite episode, as he found the idea of using an entire episode to bring back a character a "smart, structural decision", and that Ben's character development, from being timid to courageous, a "great transformation".

Additionally, the episode, along with the rest of the series, was executive-produced by Hammersley, Kreamer, Lane Lueras, Steven Spielberg, Colin Trevorrow, and Frank Marshall, and also features music composed by Leo Birenberg. All eight episodes of the second season of Camp Cretaceous were released on Netflix on January 22, 2021.

== Reception ==
Following its release, the episode received mixed reviews from critics. Brooke Bajgrowicz, writing for Mashable, said that the episode felt "unnecessary", as it did not contribute to the main story of the series, and only focused on a single character. From Sci-Fi Bulletin, Paul Simpson gave the episode a 2/10 rating, and said that the episode was one viewers could "skip without any major problems". In a positive review from Den of Geek, Alana Joli Abbott wrote that the moment of "Ben finding his courage and self-reliance is huge, and even after Bumpy's return, the character arc makes Ben's journey one of the best in the series so far."

== See also ==
- List of films featuring dinosaurs
