= Eric G. Bruggink =

American judge (born 1949)

Eric Bruggink
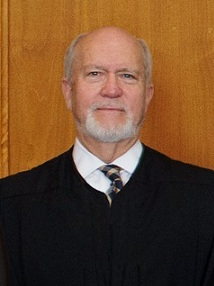
- Bruggink in 2017

Senior Judge of the United States Court of Federal Claims
- Incumbent
- Assumed office April 16, 2001

Judge of the United States Court of Federal Claims
- In office April 16, 1986 – April 16, 2001
- Appointed by: Ronald Reagan
- Preceded by: Harry E. Wood
- Succeeded by: Lawrence J. Block

Personal details
- Born: Eric Gerard Bruggink; September 11, 1949 (age 77) Kalidjati, Indonesia
- Education: Auburn University (BA, MA); University of Alabama (JD)

Eric Gerard Bruggink (born September 11, 1949) is a senior judge of the United States Court of Federal Claims, having served as an active member of that court from 1986 to 2001.

== Early life, education, and career ==
Born in Kalidjati, West Java, Indonesia, Bruggink became a naturalized citizen of the United States in 1960. He received a Bachelor of Arts in sociology from Auburn University in 1971, cum laude, a Master of Arts in speech from that institution the following year, and a Juris Doctor from the University of Alabama School of Law in 1975, where he was a Hugo Black Scholar and Note and Comments Editor of the Alabama Law Review.

He was a law clerk to Judge Frank Hampton McFadden of the U.S. District Court for the Northern District of Alabama from 1975 to 1976, and then entered private practice as an associate with the firm of Hardwick, Hause & Segrest in Dothan, Alabama from 1976 to 1977. He was an assistant director of the Alabama Law Institute from 1977 to 1979, during which time he established the Office of Energy and Environmental Law and served as its first director. He then returned to private practice as an associate with the law firm of Steiner, Crum & Baker in Montgomery, Alabama until 1982. Bruggink was appointed Director, Office of Appeals Counsel of the U.S. Merit Systems Protection Board in November 1982, and served in that position until his appointment as judge of the Court of Federal Claims.

=== Claims court service ===
On January 21, 1986, Bruggink was nominated by President Ronald Reagan to what was then the United States Claims Court, to a seat vacated by Harry Eugene Wood. Bruggink was confirmed by the Senate on April 15, 1986, and received his commission on April 16, 1986. He entered into duty on April 21, 1986, and assumed senior status on April 16, 2001.

== Personal life ==
Bruggink married the former Melinda Harris, with whom he has two sons, John and David. He speaks Dutch, from his Indonesian upbringing. He is a member of the Alabama State Bar, the District of Columbia Bar, and the Federal Circuit Bar.

Legal offices
Preceded by Harry E. Wood	Judge of the United States Court of Federal Claims; 1986–2001	Succeeded by Lawrence J. Block
