= Nathan Bedford Forrest =

Confederate States Army general, planter, and slave trader (1821–1877)

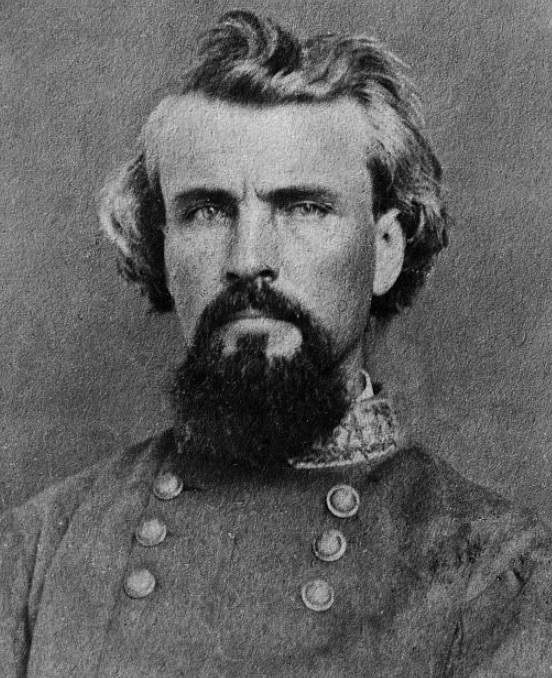
- Forrest in uniform, c. 1862
- Born: Nathan Bedford Forrest; July 13, 1821; Chapel Hill, Tennessee, U.S.
- Died: October 29, 1877 (aged 56); Memphis, Tennessee, U.S.
- Burial place: October 31, 1877 (also 1904) Memphis, Tennessee, U.S. September 18, 2021 Columbia, Tennessee, U.S.
- Relatives: Forrest family: Aaron H. Forrest (brother); Jeffrey E. Forrest (brother); Jesse A. Forrest (brother); John N. Forrest (brother); Mary Forrest Bradley (granddaughter); Mat Luxton (half-brother); Nathan Bedford Forrest II (grandson); Nathan Bedford Forrest III (great grandson); William H. Forrest (brother)
- Military career
- Allegiance: Confederate States
- Branch: Confederate States Army
- Service years: 1861–1865
- Rank: Lieutenant General
- Nicknames: "Old Bed" "Wizard of the Saddle"
- Units: Company E, 6th Tennessee Cavalry Battalion
- Commands: 3rd Tennessee Cavalry Regiment; Forrest's Cavalry Brigade; Forrest's Cavalry Division; Forrest's Cavalry Corps
- Battles: See battles: American Civil War; Battle of Fort Donelson; Battle of Shiloh; First Battle of Murfreesboro; Battle of Brentwood; Streight's Raid; Battle of Chickamauga; Battle of Okolona; Battle of Paducah; Battle of Fort Pillow; Battle of Brices Cross Roads; Battle of Tupelo; Second Battle of Memphis; Battle of Johnsonville; Third Battle of Murfreesboro; Battle of Nashville; Battle of Selma

Nathan Bedford Forrest (July 13, 1821 – October 29, 1877) was a Confederate general, noted for his aggressive cavalry tactics and rapid rise from private to general during the American Civil War. After the war, Forrest was inaugurated as the first Grand Wizard of the Reconstruction-era Ku Klux Klan.

Born into a poor family, as a young man Forrest would amass substantial wealth as a horse and cattle trader, real estate broker, and cotton plantation owner, and was also directly involved in the interstate slave trade, including operating a slave jail in Memphis. In June 1861, shortly after the Civil War began with the splitting of the United States into the Union and the Confederacy, Forrest enlisted in the Confederate Army. Forrest became one of the few soldiers during the war to enlist as a private and be promoted to general without previous military training. An expert cavalry leader, Forrest was given command of a cavalry corps and established new doctrines for mobile forces, earning him the nickname "The Wizard of the Saddle". He used his cavalry troops as mounted infantry and often deployed artillery as the lead in battle, thus helping to "revolutionize cavalry tactics".

In April 1864, at the Battle of Fort Pillow, Confederate forces under Forrest's command killed a large number of Union troops after the fort had effectively ceased resistance, most of them black soldiers. Contemporary Northern newspapers and congressional investigations held Forrest responsible, while later historians have differed over whether the killings resulted from explicit orders, loss of control during the assault, or racialized battlefield practices within the Confederate army.

Forrest joined the Ku Klux Klan in the fall of 1866, and was elected its first Grand Wizard in the spring of 1867. The group was a secretive network of dens across the post-war South, where politically active black people and their allies were threatened, assaulted and murdered. During Forrest's tenure as Grand Wizard, Klan organizations across the South used violence and intimidation to suppress Black political participation in the elections of 1868, although historians disagree about the extent of Forrest's direct control over local operations. In 1869, Forrest expressed disillusionment with what historians have described as the Klan's campaign of racial terror and its lack of centralized discipline, and issued a letter ordering the dissolution of the Ku Klux Klan as well as the destruction of its costumes; he then withdrew from the organization. Forrest later denied being a Klan member, and in the 1870s twice made statements in support of racial harmony and black dignity. During the last years of his life, he served on the board of a railroad and farmed President's Island using convict labor. Forrest died of illness in 1877, at the age of 56.

== Early life and career ==
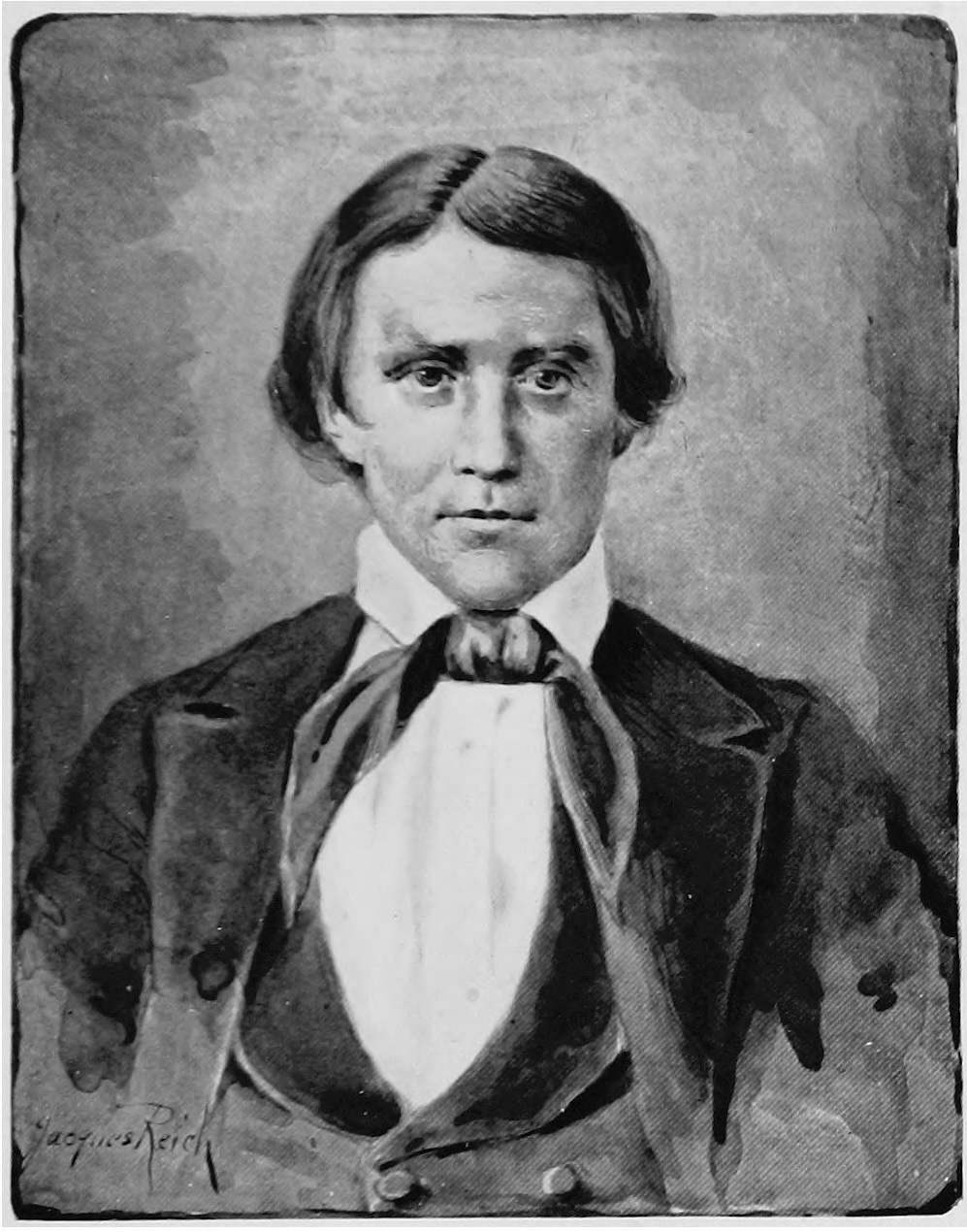
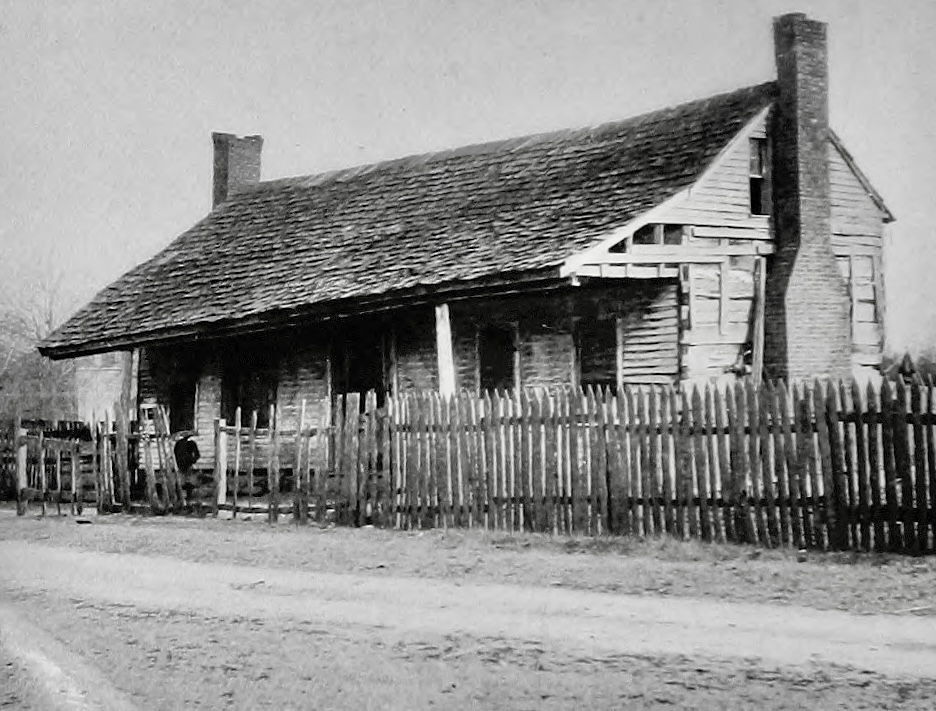
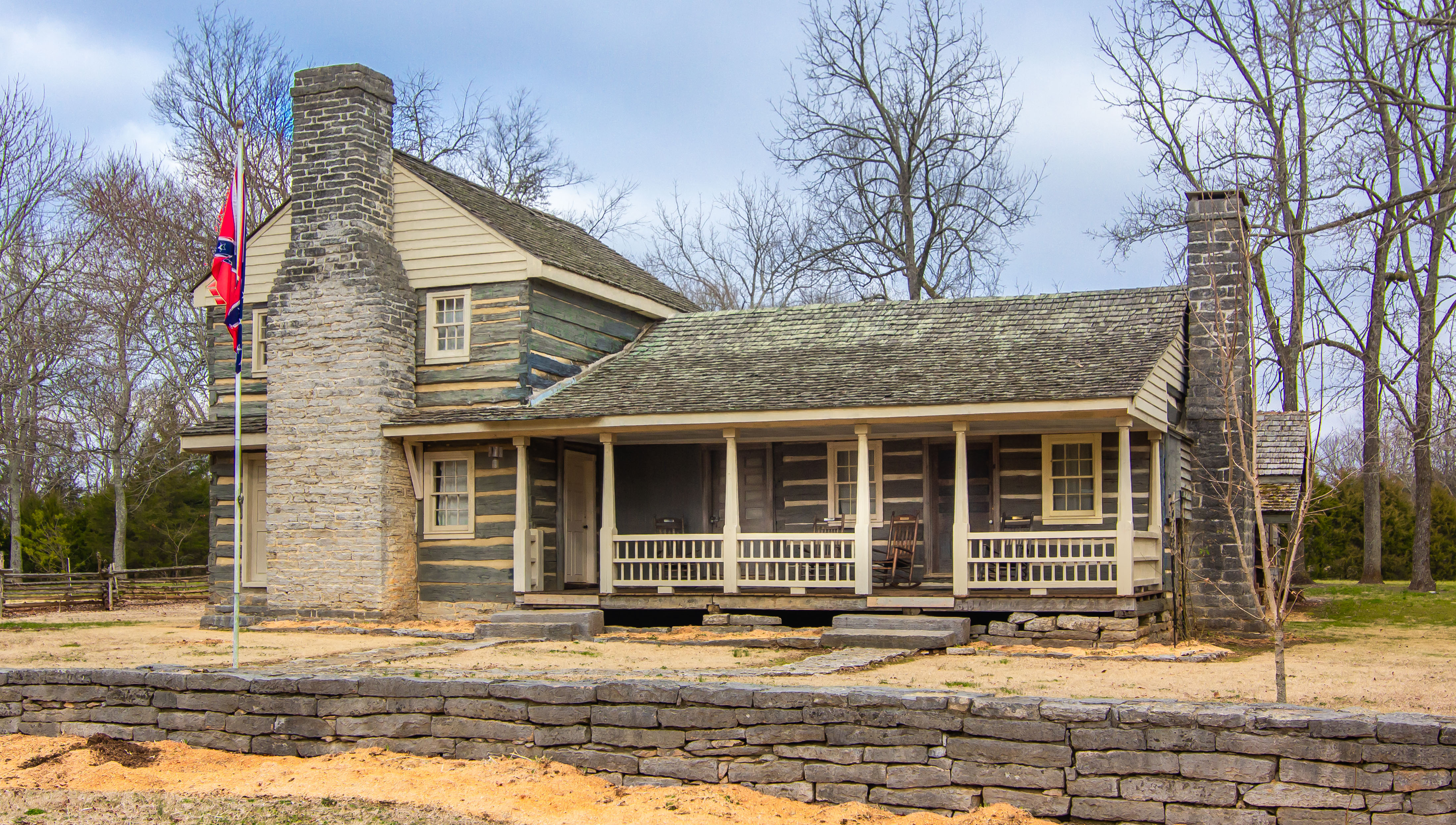
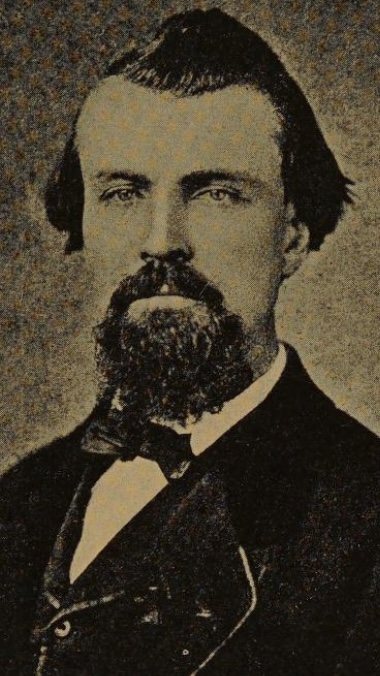
Forrest "in early life"; childhood home in DeSoto County, Mississippi; Nathan Bedford Forrest Boyhood Home, Chapel Hill, Tennessee; "N. B. Forrest – Before the War"

Nathan Bedford Forrest was born on July 13, 1821, to William and Miriam (née Beck) Forrest, a poor settler family living in a secluded frontier cabin near the hamlet of Chapel Hill in Bedford County (present day Marshall County), Tennessee.

His father was of English descent, and while most of Nathan's biographers state that his mother was of Scotch-Irish descent, an article published by the Tennessee Genealogical Society asserts that she, too, was of English descent.

He and his twin sister, Fanny, were the two eldest of twelve children. Their great-grandfather, Shadrach Forrest, moved between 1730 and 1740 from Virginia to North Carolina, where both his son (Bedford's grandfather) and grandson (Bedford's father) were born. They moved to Tennessee in 1806, and he died in Bedford, Tennessee, the year before Nathan Bedford was born. Forrest's family lived in a log house (now preserved as the Nathan Bedford Forrest Boyhood Home) from 1830 to 1833. John Allan Wyeth, who served in an Alabama regiment under Forrest, described it as a one-room building with a loft and no windows.

William Forrest continued blacksmithing in Tennessee until 1834, when the family moved to Salem, Mississippi. When his father died in 1837, Nathan became the primary caretaker of the family at age 16. Forrest ventured into a business partnership with his uncle, Jonathan Forrest, in Hernando, Mississippi in 1841. His uncle was subsequently killed at the business in 1845 by the Matlock brothers during an argument. In retaliation, Bedford shot and killed two of them with his two-shot pistol and wounded two others with a borrowed knife that was thrown to him. One brother later served under Forrest's command, for a time, during the Civil War. Forrest's early business ventures included a livery stable, a stagecoach line, and a brickyard. He became well known as a Memphis speculator and Mississippi gambler.

In 1858, Forrest was elected a Memphis city alderman as a Southern Democrat and served two consecutive terms. He purchased two large cotton plantations in Coahoma County, Mississippi and bought a one-half property interest in an Arkansas plantation in 1859; by October 1860, he owned at least 3,345 acres in Mississippi. He also acquired several cotton plantations in the Delta region of West Tennessee. By the time the American Civil War started in 1861, he had become one of the wealthiest men in the Southern United States, having amassed a "personal fortune that he claimed was worth $1.5 million".

Forrest stood 6 feet 2 inches (1.88 m) tall, weighed about 180 pounds (82 kg), rarely drank, and abstained from tobacco use. He was known as a tireless rider in the saddle and a skilled swordsman. Forrest was noted as having a "striking and commanding presence" by Union Army Captain Lewis Hosea, an aide to Gen. James H. Wilson. He was often described as generally mild-mannered, but according to Hosea and other contemporaries who knew him, his demeanor changed drastically when provoked or angered. Although he was not formally educated, according to Spaulding, Forrest was able to read and write clear and grammatical English, though he was a poor speller. He was initiated into Freemasonry, but did not progress beyond the Entered Apprentice degree.

== Marriage and family ==
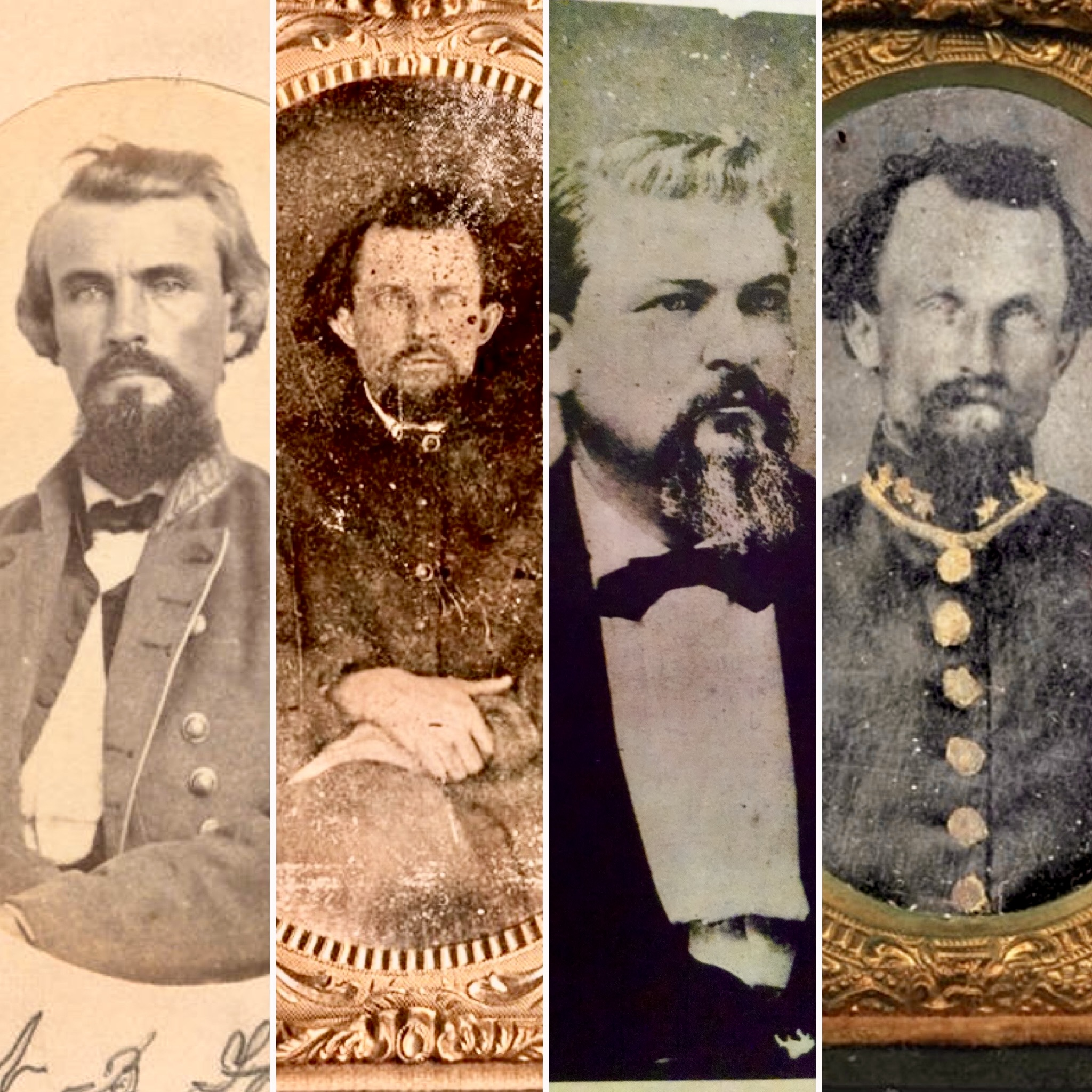
The brothers Forrest, left to right: N. B. Forrest, William H. Forrest, Jesse A. Forrest (photographed after the civil war), and Jeffrey E. Forrest; there may be no surviving photographs of Aaron H. Forrest and John N. Forrest

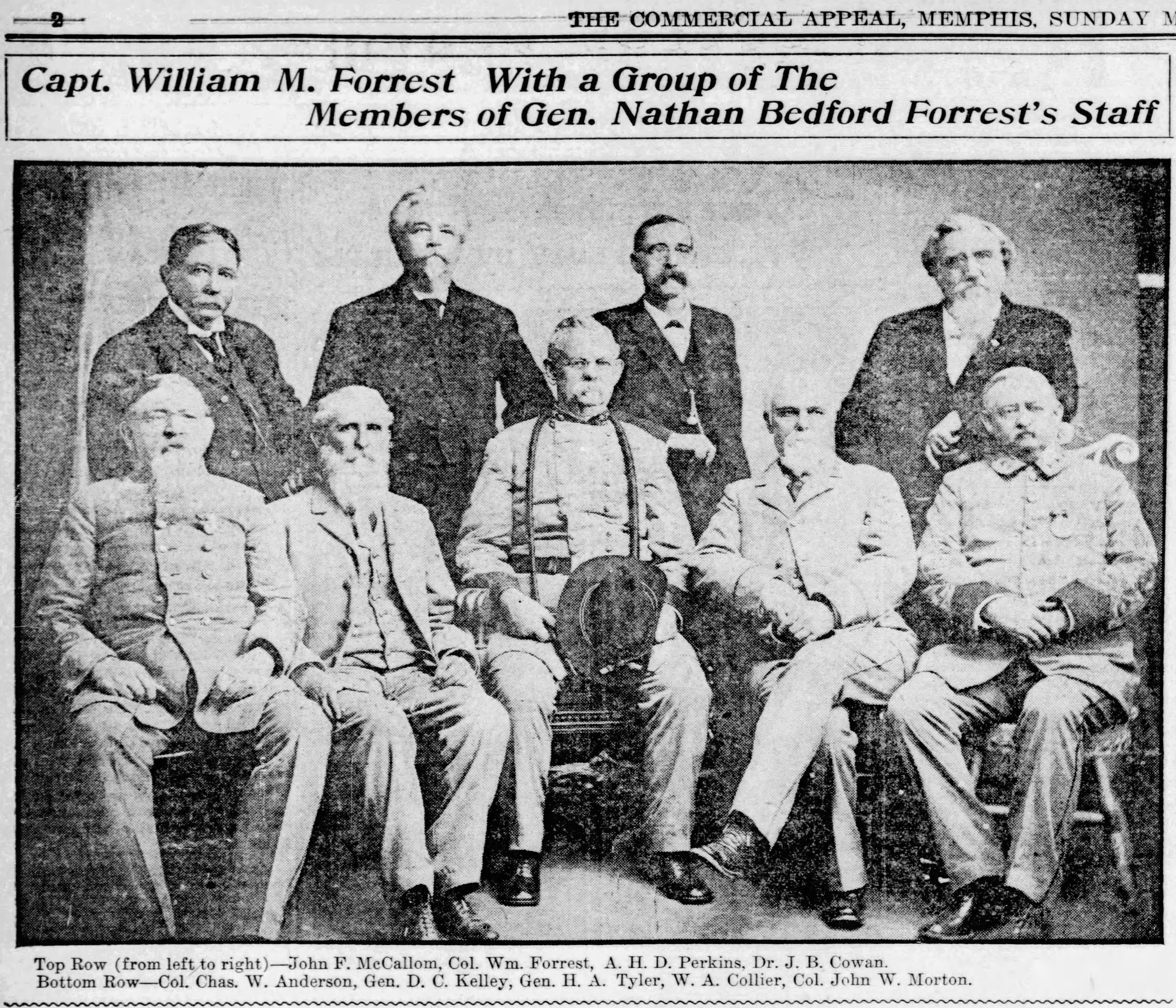
N. B. Forrest, his 15-year-old son W. M. Forrest, and his 25-year-old brother J. E. Forrest all enlisted in the Confederate States Army on the same day; Jeffrey Forrest was killed in action at the Battle of Okolona in 1864 ("Capt. William M. Forrest With a Group of the Members of Gen. Nathan Bedford Forrest's Staff" Memphis Commercial Appeal, February 9, 1908)

Forrest had twelve siblings; five years after the death of one sister, two of his eight brothers and all three remaining sisters died while still young and at about the same time during a typhoid fever outbreak. He also contracted the disease, but survived; his father initially recovered but died from the residual effects of the disease five years later, when Bedford was 16. His mother, Miriam, then married James Horatio Luxton of Marshall, Texas, in 1843 and gave birth to four more children. All of Forrest's younger brothers—in order, John N. Forrest, William H. Forrest, Aaron H. Forrest, Jesse A. Forrest, and Jeffrey E. Forrest—worked as slave traders with him before the war. All but John—who was a disabled veteran of the Mexican–American War—served as Confederate military officers in Tennessee and Mississippi during the American Civil War. Forrest's son William M. Forrest served as his aide-de-camp, and his half-brother Mat Luxton was a sergeant and scout in his cavalry.

In 1845, Forrest married Mary Ann Montgomery (1826–1893), the niece of a Presbyterian minister who was her legal guardian. They had two children, William Montgomery Bedford Forrest (1846–1908), who enlisted at the age of 15 and served alongside his father in the war, and a daughter, Fanny (1849–1854), who died in childhood. There are also reports from 1864 that Forrest had two children, Thomas and Narcissa, with an enslaved woman named Catharine.

Forrest's grandson, Nathan Bedford Forrest II (1872–1931), became commander-in-chief of the Sons of Confederate Veterans and a Grand Dragon of the Ku Klux Klan in Georgia and secretary of the national organization. His granddaughter, Mary Forrest Bradley, served as president of the Tennessee Division of the United Daughters of the Confederacy. A great-grandson, Nathan Bedford Forrest III (1905–1943), graduated from West Point and rose to the rank of brigadier general in the U.S. Army Air Corps; he was killed during a bombing raid over Nazi Germany in 1943, becoming the first American general to die in combat in the European theater of World War II.

== Slave trading ==
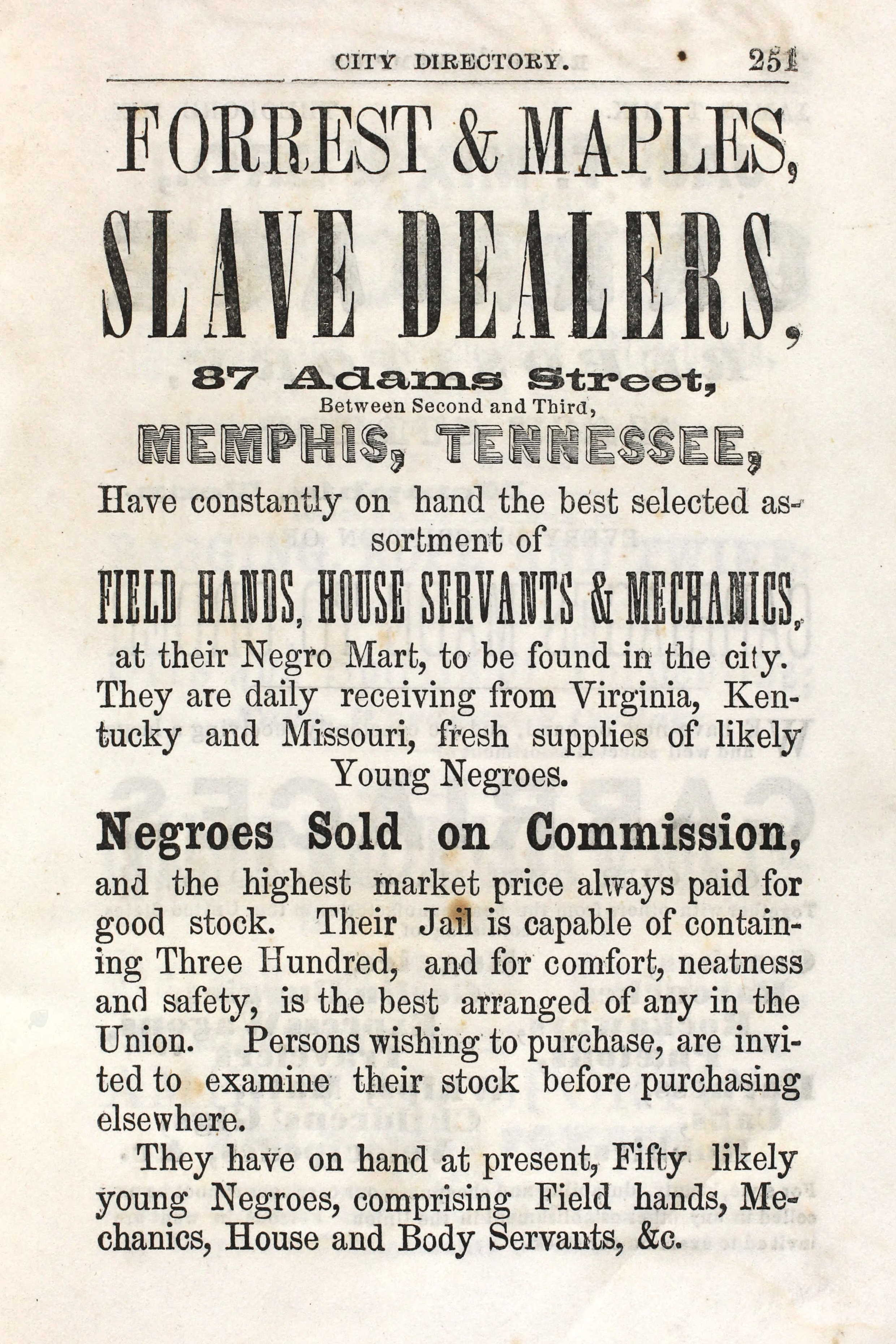
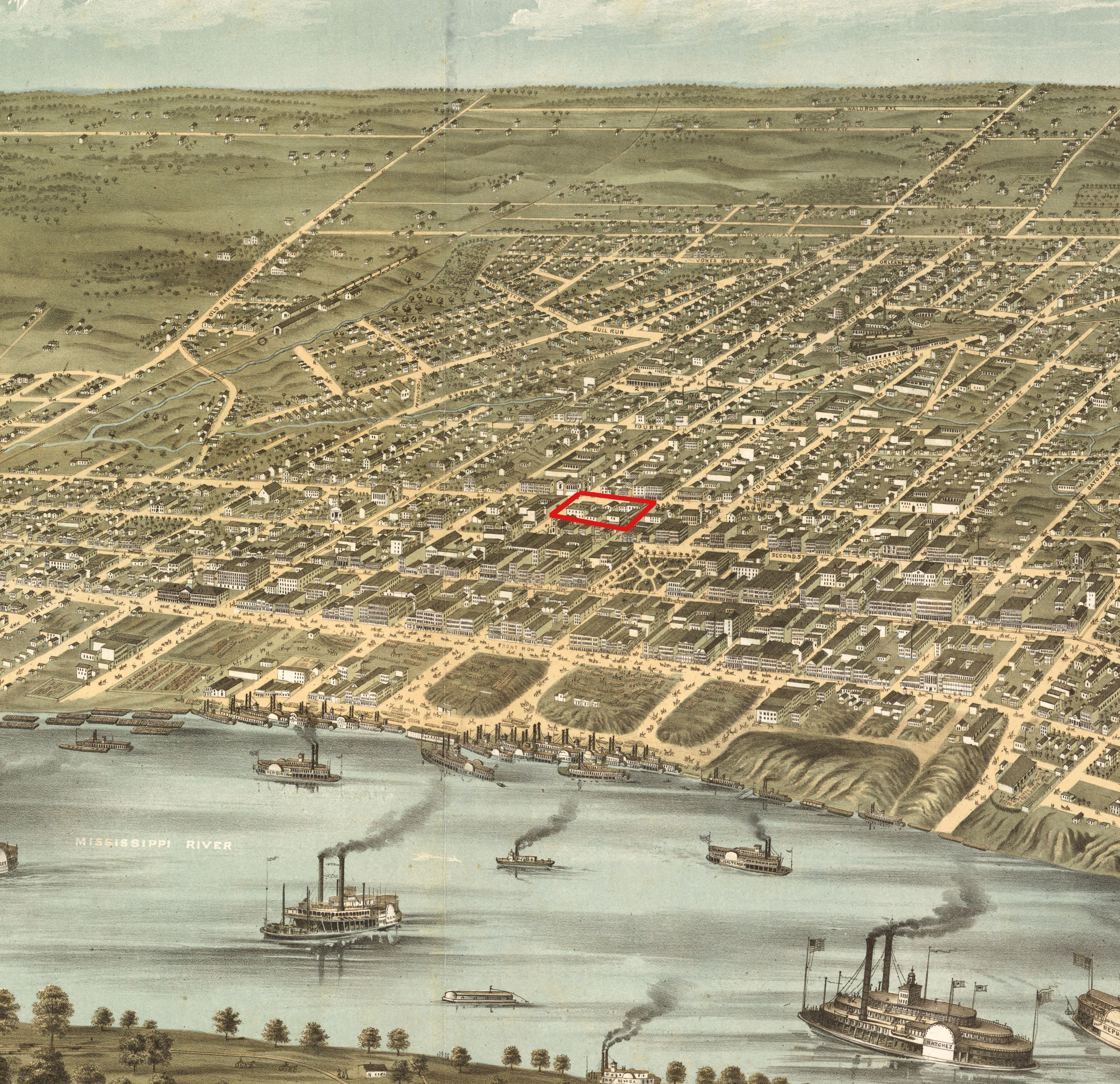
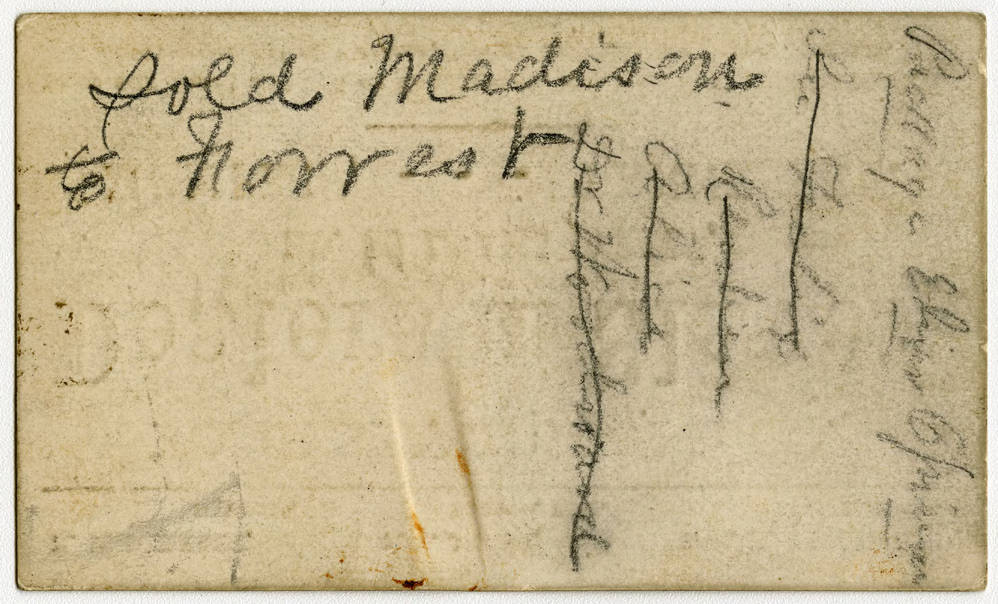
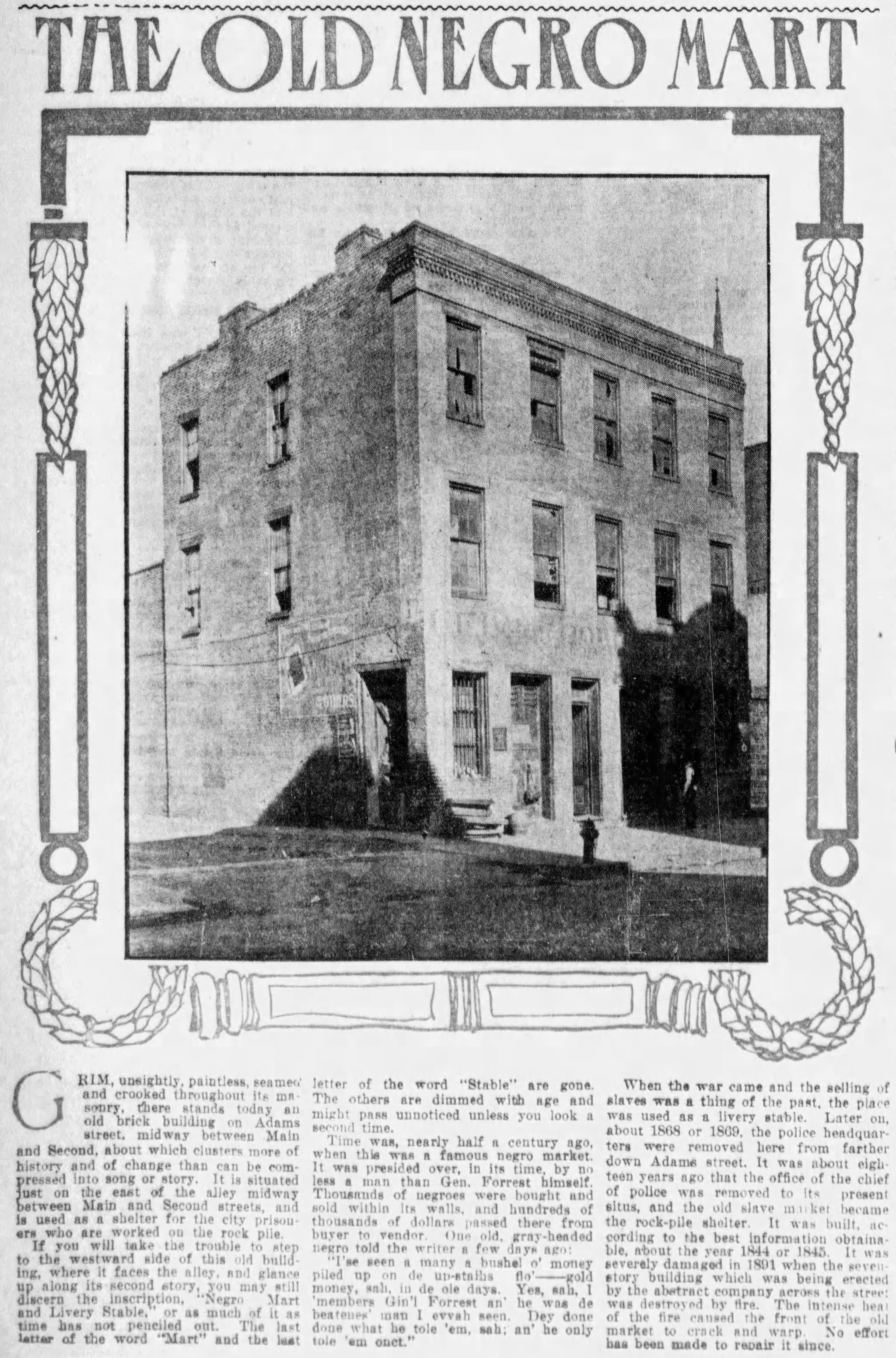
Forrest & Maples advertisement in the Memphis city directory; 87 and 89 Adams marked in red; reverse side of card advertising Forrest, Jones & Co. with handwritten note "sold Madison to Forrest"; an "old negro mart" pictured 1907, inaccurately associated with Forrest

Nathan Bedford Forrest—disparaged by Parson Brownlow in 1864 as a "sin-hardened negro trader, and livery stable man of Memphis"—was a notable slave trader of the United States from 1851 to 1860. Forrest was considered one of the "big four" "phenomenally large" traders in Memphis, which was the "first-class market" for slave trading in Tennessee. He is believed to have sold thousands of slaves during his career and to have earned profits of hundreds of thousands of dollars in 1850s currency. Primarily based in Memphis, he was able to open a second storefront in Vicksburg in 1858. During the American Civil War, Forrest cited his business experience in a written request for an independent command: "I have resided on the Mississippi for over twenty years, was for many years engaged in buying and selling negroes, and know the country perfectly well between Memphis and Vicksburg, and also am well acquainted with all the prominent planters in that region, as well as above Memphis."

After initially working as an independent slave trader, he was first in partnership with Seaborne S. Jones; second, in partnership with Byrd Hill (a more experienced manager of negro marts); third, in partnership with Josiah Maples; then again a sole proprietor; and finally reunited with Jones.

Beginning in the Forrest & Maples era, his business was headquartered at 87 Adams Street in Memphis, where several other slave traders operated slave pens and auction yards, making the area an efficient business cluster. After the war, a woman named Nellie Harbold placed a family reunification ad hoping to find her children, Lydia, Miley A., and Samuel Tirley, all of whom had been sold to separate buyers out of "the yard of Forrest the Trader" in Memphis in 1854. Forrest was traditionally said to have been trained by the principals of Bolton, Dickens & Co., a multimillion-dollar operation that traded in a dozen Southern cities, but recent research suggests this claim may be apocryphal. After the completion of the Memphis and Charleston Railroad in 1857, Forrest began moving slaves by rail from South Carolina, including a carpenter named Richard and a man named Bent, both of whom promptly ran away from their new owners in Tennessee. In 1859, media coverage of Forrest's business spotlighted a particular servant for sale: an enslaved girl said to be the daughter of Frederick Douglass and advertised as a "likely girl". Historian Tim Huebner asserts this was likely Anna Marie Bailey, a niece of Douglass.

Among the servants offered for sale by a Mr. Forrest of Memphis, Tenn., is a girl who is known to be the daughter of the notorious Fred Douglass, the "free-nigger" Abolitionist.—She is said to be of the class known among the dealers as a "likely girl," and is a native of North Carolina.—She remembers her "parient" very vividly, having seen him during his last visit to the Old North State. The Memphis Avalanche suggests that as Fred is ample able to make the outlay he should either purchase his own flesh and blood from servitude, or cease his shrieks over an institution which possesses such untold horrors.

— Winchester (Tenn.) Home Journal, 1859

In 1859, a federal investigation found that Forrest also sold 37 individuals illegally imported to the United States from Africa on the slave ship Wanderer. Forrest, who advocated for the reopening of the transatlantic slave trade, later told an interviewer that he had been an initial investor in the Wanderer shipment. In January 1860, the New York Times reported that the Forrest, Jones & Co. negro mart building in Memphis had both collapsed and then caught fire; two people died. The firm's bills of sale for people, "amounting in the aggregate to US$400,000 (equivalent to about $14,333,330 in 2025)," were salvaged. Forrest had recently moved from 87 Adams to 89 Adams, which allowed him to increase his holding capacity from a maximum of 300 slaves to a maximum of 500. Forrest subsequently sold his interest in the business after the building catastrophe and reinvested the profit into plantations. A marker was erected at the former site of Forrest's slave mart in downtown Memphis, on land now owned by Calvary Episcopal Church, and was dedicated on April 4, 2018.

== American Civil War ==
=== Early cavalry command ===
After the Civil War broke out, Forrest returned to Tennessee from his Mississippi ventures and enlisted in the Confederate States Army (CSA) on June 14, 1861. He reported for training at Fort Wright near Randolph, Tennessee, joining Captain Josiah White's cavalry Company E, nicknamed "the Tennessee Mounted Rifles," of the 6th Tennessee Cavalry Battalion, as a private, along with his youngest brother, Jesse A. Forrest, and his 15-year-old son, William Montgomery Forrest. Upon seeing how badly equipped the CSA was, Forrest offered to buy horses and equipment with his own money for a regiment of Tennessee volunteer soldiers.

His superior officers and Tennessee Governor Isham G. Harris were surprised that someone of Forrest's wealth and prominence had enlisted as a soldier, especially since significant planters were exempted from service. They commissioned him as a lieutenant colonel and authorized him to recruit and train a battalion of Confederate mounted rangers. In October 1861, Forrest was given command of a regiment, the 3rd Tennessee Cavalry. Although Forrest had no prior formal military training or experience, he exhibited leadership and soon proved he could successfully employ military tactics.

Forrest gained a reputation for his willingness to maintain discipline through the use of physical force. When the information with which a scout returned proved to be erroneous, Forrest struck the man's head against a tree. After a lieutenant refused to join his troops in a river where they were building a bridge, Forrest pushed him into the water. A soldier who refused to paddle across the Tennessee River was hit with an oar by his general. Two others who fled from a rout were beaten with a branch, and Forrest shot the one who had been carrying the colors. Along with brutal treatment of his prisoners, this led many soldiers and junior officers to refuse to serve under him.

Public debate surrounded Tennessee's decision to join the Confederacy, and both the Confederate and United States armies recruited soldiers from the state. Over 100,000 men from Tennessee served with the Confederacy, and over 31,000 served with the Union Army. Forrest posted advertisements to join his regiment with the slogan, "Let's have some fun and kill some Yankees!". Forrest's command included his Escort Company (his "special forces"), for which he selected the best soldiers available. This unit, which varied in size from 40 to 90 men, constituted the elite of his cavalry.

=== Sacramento and Fort Donelson ===
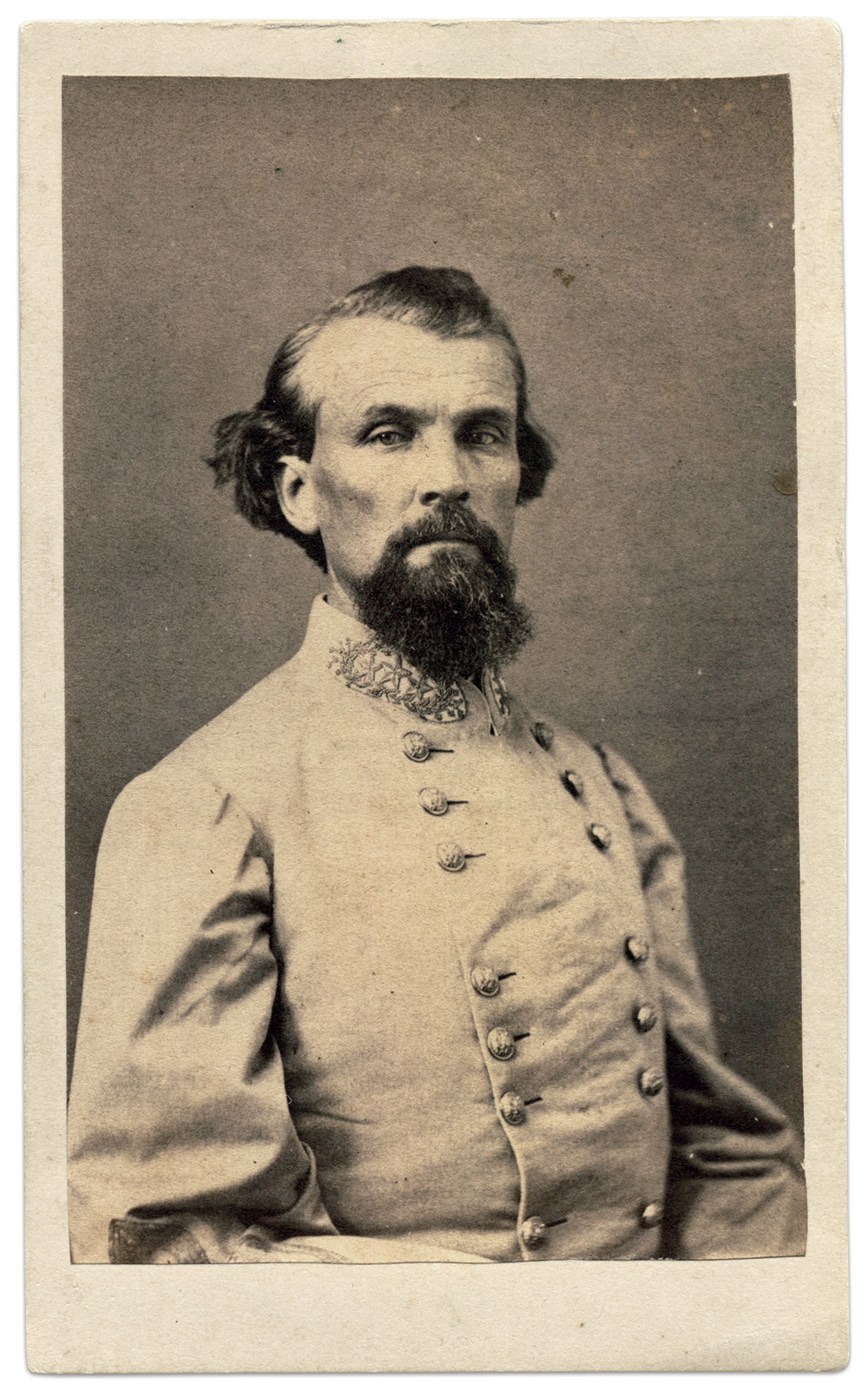
Col. Bedford Forrest carte de visite by Bingham & Brothers Gallery of Memphis (Steve and Mike Romano Collection, Military Images)

Forrest won praise for his performance under fire during an early victory in the Battle of Sacramento in Kentucky, the first in which he commanded troops in the field, during which he routed a Union Army force by personally leading a cavalry charge that Brigadier General Charles Clark later commended. Forrest distinguished himself further at the Battle of Fort Donelson in February 1862. After his cavalry captured a Union artillery battery, he broke out of the siege headed by Major General Ulysses S. Grant, rallying nearly 4,000 troops and leading them to escape across the Cumberland River.

A few days after the Confederate surrender of Fort Donelson, with the fall of Nashville to Union forces imminent, Forrest took command of the city. All available carts and wagons were pressed into service to haul 600 boxes of army clothing, 250,000 pounds of bacon, and 40 wagonloads of ammunition to the railroad depots, to be sent off to Chattanooga and Decatur. Forrest arranged for heavy ordnance machinery—including a new cannon rifling machine and 14 cannons—as well as parts from the Nashville Armory, to be sent to Atlanta for use by the Confederate Army.

=== Shiloh and Murfreesboro ===
A month later, Forrest was back in action at the Battle of Shiloh, fought April 6–7, 1862. After the Union victory, Forrest commanded a Confederate rear guard. In the battle of Fallen Timbers, he drove through the Union skirmish line. Not realizing that the rest of his men had halted their charge when they reached the full Union brigade, Forrest charged the brigade alone and soon found himself surrounded. He emptied his Colt Army revolvers into the swirling mass of Union Army soldiers and pulled out his saber, hacking, and slashing. A Union infantryman on the ground beside Forrest fired a musket ball at him with a point-blank shot, nearly knocking him out of the saddle. The ball went through Forrest's pelvis and lodged near his spine. A surgeon removed the musket ball a week later without anesthesia, which was unavailable.

By early summer, Forrest commanded a new brigade of inexperienced cavalry regiments. He led them into Middle Tennessee in July under orders to launch a cavalry raid. On July 13, 1862, he led them into the First Battle of Murfreesboro, as a result of which all of the Union units surrendered to Forrest. The Confederates destroyed much of the Union Army's supplies and railroad tracks in the area.

=== West Tennessee raids ===
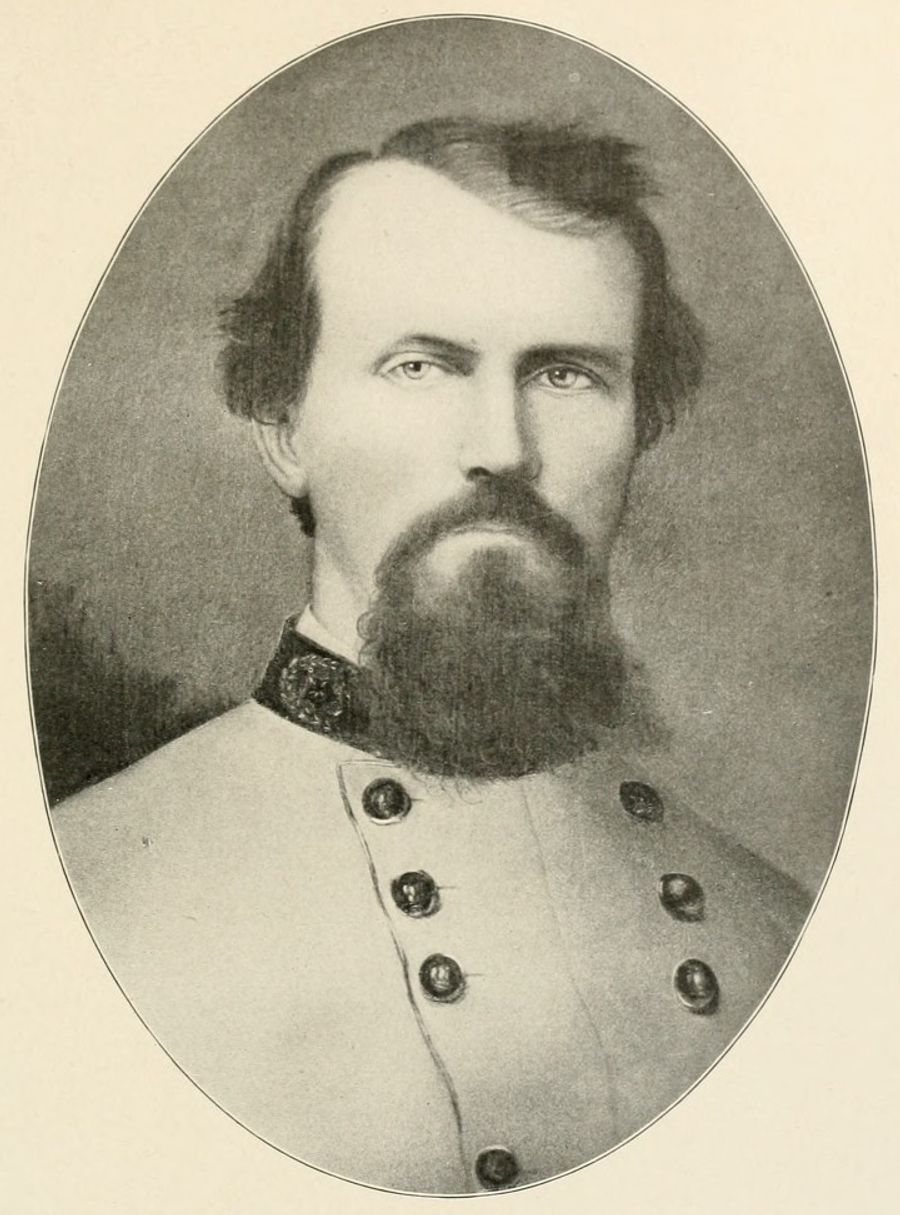
Gen. Bedford Forrest

Promoted on July 21, 1862, to brigadier general, Forrest was given command of a Confederate cavalry brigade. At this time, Forrest's cavalry operations were directed under Major General Earl Van Dorn, who commanded Confederate forces in the region. Forrest served as Van Dorn's cavalry leader during a series of raids designed to disrupt Union advances, including operations leading up to the successful Holly Springs Raid, a surprise attack orchestrated by Van Dorn that destroyed Union supply lines and forced Grant to temporarily halt his Vicksburg campaign — an outcome that preserved the South's access to major ports and kept Confederate hopes alive at a critical moment in the war. In March 1863, Forrest and Van Dorn worked together again to deliver another decisive Confederate victory at the Battle of Thompson's Station, capturing over 1,200 Union troops and halting Federal momentum in central Tennessee. These experiences significantly influenced Forrest's evolving approach to mobile warfare. In December 1862, Forrest's veteran troopers were reassigned by General Braxton Bragg to another officer despite his protest. Forrest had to recruit a new brigade of about 2,000 inexperienced men, most of whom lacked weapons. Again, Bragg ordered a series of raids to disrupt the communications of the Union Army forces under Grant, which were threatening the city of Vicksburg, Mississippi. Forrest protested that sending such untrained men behind enemy lines was suicidal, but Bragg insisted, and Forrest obeyed his orders. In the ensuing raids, he was pursued by thousands of Union soldiers trying to locate his fast-moving forces. Avoiding attack by never staying in one place long, Forrest eventually led his troops during the spring and summer of 1864 on raids into west Tennessee, as far north as the banks of the Ohio River in southwest Kentucky and into north Mississippi.

Forrest returned to his base in Mississippi with more men than he had started with. By then, all were fully armed with captured Union Army weapons. As a result, Grant was forced to revise and delay his Vicksburg campaign strategy. Newspaper correspondent Sylvanus Cadwallader, who traveled with Grant for three years during his campaigns, wrote that Forrest "was the only Confederate cavalryman of whom Grant stood in much dread".

=== Dover, Brentwood, and Chattanooga ===
The Union Army gained military control of Tennessee in 1862 and occupied it for the duration of the war, having taken control of strategic cities and railroads. Forrest continued to lead his men in small-scale operations, including the Battle of Dover and the Battle of Brentwood until April 1863. The Confederate army dispatched him with a small force into the backcountry of northern Alabama and western Georgia to defend against an attack of 3,000 Union Army cavalrymen commanded by Colonel Abel Streight. Streight had orders to cut the Confederate railroad south of Chattanooga, Tennessee, to seal off Bragg's supply line and force him to retreat into Georgia. Forrest chased Streight's men for 16 days, harassing them all the way. Streight's goal changed from dismantling the railroad to escaping the pursuit. On May 3, Forrest caught up with Streight's unit east of Cedar Bluff, Alabama. Forrest had fewer men than the Union side but feigned having a larger force by repeatedly parading some around a hilltop until Streight was convinced to surrender his 1,500 or so exhausted troops (historians Kevin Dougherty and Keith S. Hebert say he had about 1,700 men).

=== Day's Gap, Chickamauga, and Paducah ===
Not all of Forrest's exploits of individual combat involved enemy troops. Lieutenant Andrew Wills Gould, an artillery officer in Forrest's command, was being transferred, presumably because cannons under his command were spiked (disabled) by the enemy during the Battle of Day's Gap. On June 13, 1863, Gould confronted Forrest about his transfer, which escalated into a violent exchange. Gould shot Forrest in the left side, and Forrest mortally stabbed Gould. Forrest was thought to have been fatally wounded by Gould, but he recovered and was ready to fight in the Chickamauga Campaign.

Forrest served with the main army at the Battle of Chickamauga on September 18–20, 1863, in which he pursued the retreating Union Army and took hundreds of prisoners. Like several others under Bragg's command, he urged an immediate follow-up attack to recapture Chattanooga, which had fallen a few weeks before. Bragg failed to do so, upon which Forrest was quoted as saying, "What does he fight battles for?"

Forrest (along with other subordinates of Bragg) was not blameless for the disorganization that had led Bragg to decide against pursuit after the Chickamauga victory. He and Wheeler had regularly failed throughout the entire Chattanooga campaign to gather intelligence on the disposition of Union forces, in Forrest's case because he often involved himself in the thick of battles where he could not gather this information. Forrest also failed tactically on the first day of battle, moving his troops north up the creek in response to a perceived threat instead of screening the Confederate advance as he had been ordered to. As a result, the time it took the infantry to fight for the crossings at Alexander's and Reed's bridges allowed General William Rosecrans to shore up his Union defenses in the area. That night, Forrest again declined to screen the army's right flank; if he had he would have found a wide gap in the Union lines, a misstep that has been called "the most significant intelligence oversight of the entire battle" as it left Bragg utterly uninformed about Union dispositions even as he planned a counterattack. The next morning a poorly planned attack Forrest initiated in that area led to heavy casualties and delayed the counterattack.

In an attempt to build a foothold to retake Chattanooga, Bragg ordered Forrest and Wheeler north after the battle in order that they might disrupt Rosecrans's fragile supply line from Nashville. But Forrest diverted to Knoxville, allowing Rosecrans to consolidate his hold on the city, leading Bragg to describe Forrest as "nothing more than a good raider" as he signed orders to transfer Forrest out of his command, to western Tennessee, a month or so later. This supposedly led to a meeting where Forrest confronted and threatened Bragg's life, calling him a coward and saying "you might as well not give me any orders, for I will not obey them", one of several instances in his career where Forrest was openly insubordinate to his superior officers. It is now considered to be apocryphal, although it was repeated in biographies published with Forrest's approval, suggesting it reflected his assessment of Bragg.

On December 4, 1863, Forrest was promoted to the rank of major general. On March 25, 1864, Forrest's cavalry raided the town of Paducah, Kentucky, in the Battle of Paducah, during which Forrest demanded the surrender of Union Colonel Stephen G. Hicks: "if I have to storm your works, you may expect no quarter." Hicks refused to comply with the ultimatum, and according to his subsequent report, Forrest's troops took a position and set up a battery of guns while a flag of truce was still up. As soon as they received the Union reply, they moved forward at the command of a junior officer, and the Union forces opened fire. The Confederates tried to storm the fort but were repulsed; they rallied and made two more attempts, both of which failed.

=== Fort Pillow massacre ===
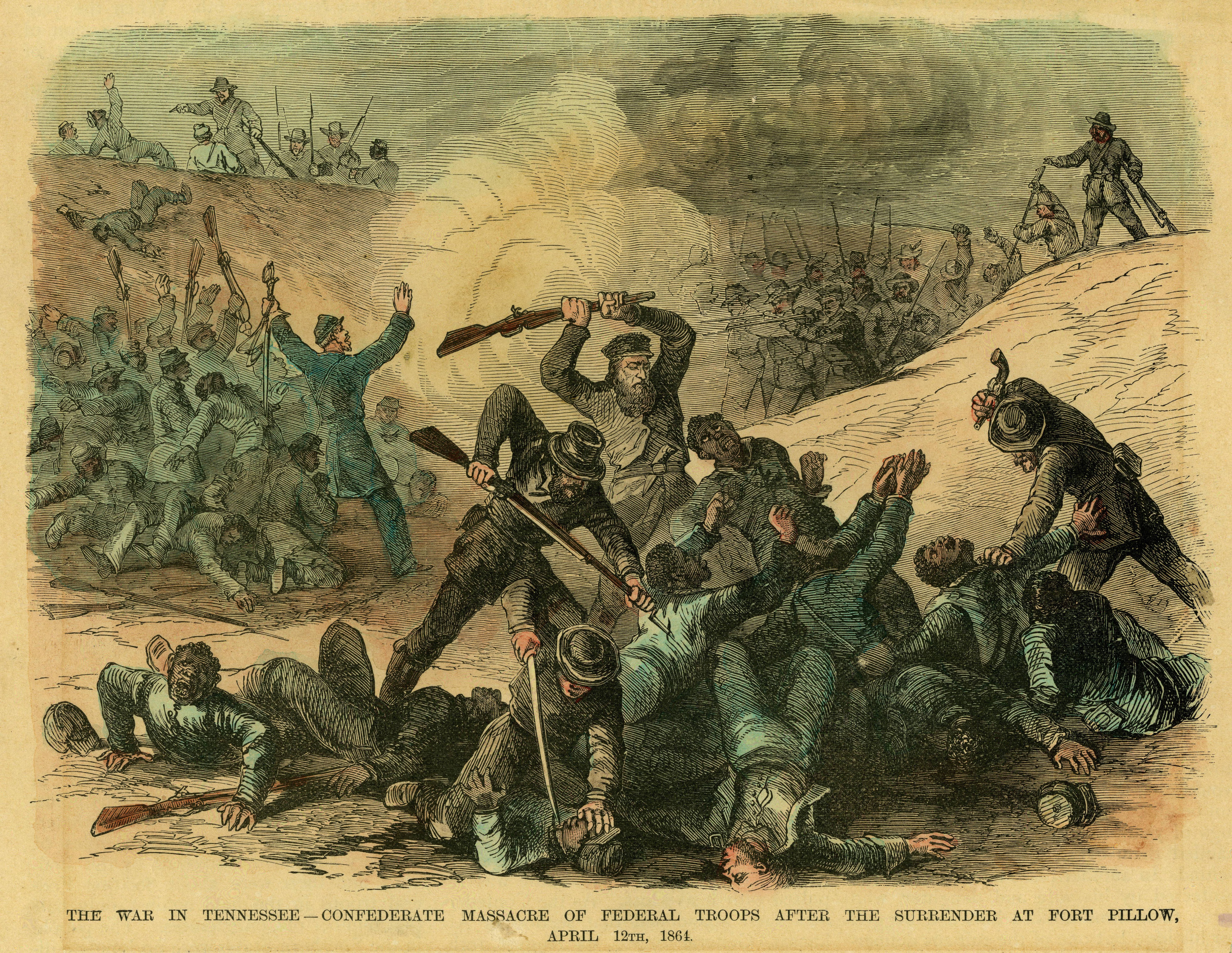
"The War in Tennessee Confederate massacre of Federal troops after the surrender of Fort Pillow April 12th 1864" (Frank Leslie's Illustrated News, May 7, 1864)

Fort Pillow, located 40 miles (64 km) upriver from Memphis (near Henning, Tennessee), was initially constructed by Confederate forces under General Gideon Johnson Pillow on the bluffs of the Mississippi River, and taken over by Union forces in 1862 after the Confederates had abandoned the fort. The fort was defended by 557 Union Army troops, 295 white and 262 black, under Union Army Maj. L.F. Booth.

On April 12, 1864, Forrest's men, under Brigadier General James R. Chalmers, attacked and recaptured Fort Pillow. Booth and his adjutant were killed in the battle, leaving Fort Pillow under the command of Major William Bradford. Forrest had reached the fort at 10 a.m. after a hard ride from Mississippi, during which two horses were shot out from under him. By 3:30 p.m., Forrest had concluded that the Union troops could not hold the fort; thus, he ordered a flag of truce raised and demanded that the fort be surrendered. As he often did to avoid the high casualties that came with having to storm fortifications, Forrest warned Bradford that he could not be held responsible for what his men might do in the heat of such a battle. Bradford refused to surrender, believing his troops could escape to the Union Navy gunboat, USS New Era, on the Mississippi River. Forrest's men immediately took over the fort, while Union Army soldiers retreated to the lower bluffs of the river, but the gunboat did not come to their rescue.

What happened next became known as the Fort Pillow Massacre. As the Union Army troops surrendered, Forrest's men opened fire, slaughtering black and white Union Army soldiers. According to historians John Cimprich and Bruce Tap, although their numbers were roughly equal, two-thirds of the black Union Army soldiers were killed, while only a third of the whites were killed. The atrocities at Fort Pillow continued throughout the night. Conflicting accounts of what occurred were given later.

Forrest's Confederate forces were accused of subjecting captured Union Army soldiers to extreme brutality, with allegations of back-shooting soldiers who fled into the river, shooting wounded soldiers, burning men alive, nailing men to barrels and igniting them, crucifixion, and hacking men to death with sabers. Forrest's men were alleged to have set fire to a Union barracks with wounded Union Army soldiers inside. In defense of their actions, Forrest's men insisted that the Union soldiers, although fleeing, kept their weapons and frequently turned to shoot, forcing the Confederates to keep firing in self-defense. The rebels said the U.S. flag was still flying over the fort, which indicated that the force had not formally surrendered. A contemporary newspaper account from Jackson, Tennessee, stated that "General Forrest begged them to surrender", but "not the first sign of surrender was ever given". Similar accounts were reported in many Confederate newspapers at the time. These statements were contradicted by Union Army survivors and by the letter of Achilles Clark, a Confederate soldier with the 20th Tennessee Cavalry who graphically recounted a massacre. Clark wrote to his sisters immediately after the battle:

The slaughter was awful. Words cannot describe the scene. The poor deluded negroes would run up to our men fall upon their knees and with uplifted hands scream for mercy but they were ordered to their feet and then shot down. The white men fared but little better. Their fort turned out to be a great slaughter pen. Blood, human blood stood about in pools and brains could have been gathered up in any quantity.

Following the cessation of hostilities, Forrest transferred the 14 most seriously wounded United States Colored Troops (USCT) to the Union steamer Silver Cloud. The 226 Union Army troops taken prisoner at Fort Pillow were marched under guard to Holly Springs, Mississippi, and then convoyed to Demopolis, Alabama. On April 21, Capt. John Goodwin, of Forrest's cavalry command, forwarded a dispatch listing the prisoners captured. The list included the names of 7 officers and 219 white enlisted soldiers. According to Richard L. Fuchs, "records concerning the fate of the black prisoners are either nonexistent or unreliable". President Abraham Lincoln asked his cabinet for opinions as to how the United States should respond to the massacre.

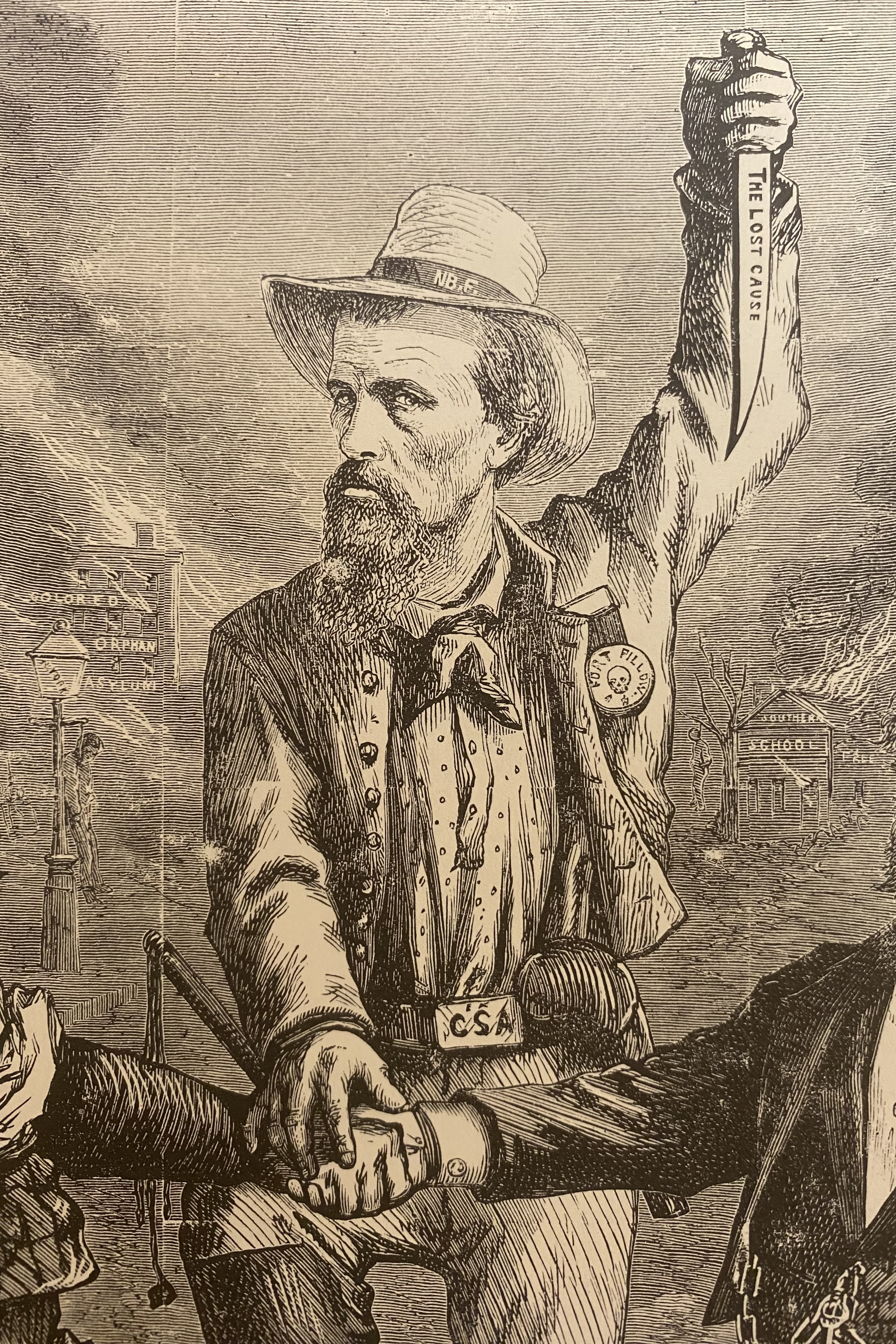
Union and Republican-aligned editorial cartoonist Thomas Nast often awarded Forrest "with an ironic Fort Pillow 'medal' when he skewered him in a dozen cartoons as a prominent white supremacy, Lost Cause of the Confederacy symbol."

At the time of the massacre, General Grant was no longer in Tennessee but had transferred to the east to command all Union troops. Grant wrote in his memoirs that Forrest, in his report of the battle, had "left out the part which shocks humanity to read".

Because of the events at Fort Pillow, the Union public and press viewed Forrest as a war criminal. A Knoxville correspondent for the New York Tribune wrote that Forrest and his brothers were "slave drivers and woman whippers", while Forrest himself was described as "mean, vindictive, cruel, and unscrupulous". The Confederate press steadfastly defended Forrest's reputation.

According to a historian studying in the Cumberland River valley during the Civil War, "Fully aware of the significance of the large-scale recruitment of black troops, the Confederates did what they could to disrupt it...Forrest himself, operating in west Tennessee, chose to interpret his stunning victory over a racially mixed garrison at Fort Pillow in April as, in part, a warning about using black troops. He described the battle graphically, recounted exaggerated Union casualty figures, and noted, 'It is hoped that these facts will demonstrate to the Northern people that negro soldiers cannot cope with the Southerners.'"

S. C. Gwynne writes, "Forrest's responsibility for the massacre has been actively debated for a century and a half. ... No direct evidence suggests that he ordered the shooting of surrendering or unarmed men, but to fully exonerate him from responsibility is also impossible".

=== Brices Cross Roads and Tupelo ===
Battle of Brices Cross Roads

Forrest's most decisive victory came on June 10, 1864, when his 3,500-man force clashed with 8,500 men commanded by Union Army Brig. Gen. Samuel D. Sturgis at the Battle of Brices Crossroads in northeastern Mississippi. Here, the mobility of the troops under his command and his superior tactics led to victory, allowing him to continue harassing Union forces in southwestern Tennessee and northern Mississippi throughout the war. Forrest set up a position for an attack to repulse a pursuing force commanded by Sturgis, who had been sent to impede Forrest from destroying Union Army supply lines and fortifications. When Sturgis's Federal army came upon the crossroads, they collided with Forrest's cavalry. Sturgis ordered his infantry to advance to the front line to counteract the cavalry. The infantry, tired, weary, and suffering under the heat, were quickly broken and sent into mass retreat. Forrest sent a full charge after the retreating army and captured 16 artillery pieces, 176 wagons, and 1,500 stands of small arms. In all, the maneuver cost Forrest 96 men killed and 396 wounded. The day was worse for Union troops, who suffered 223 killed, 394 wounded, and 1,623 missing. The losses were a deep blow to the black regiment under Sturgis's command. In the hasty retreat, they stripped off commemorative badges that read "Remember Fort Pillow" to avoid goading the Confederate force pursuing them.

One month later, while serving under General Stephen D. Lee, Forrest experienced tactical defeat at the Battle of Tupelo in 1864. Concerned about Union Army supply lines, Maj. Gen. Sherman sent a force under the command of Maj. Gen. Andrew J. Smith to deal with Forrest. Union Army forces drove the Confederates from the field, and Forrest was wounded in the foot, but his forces were not wholly destroyed. He continued to oppose Union Army efforts in the West for the remainder of the war.

=== Tennessee Raids ===
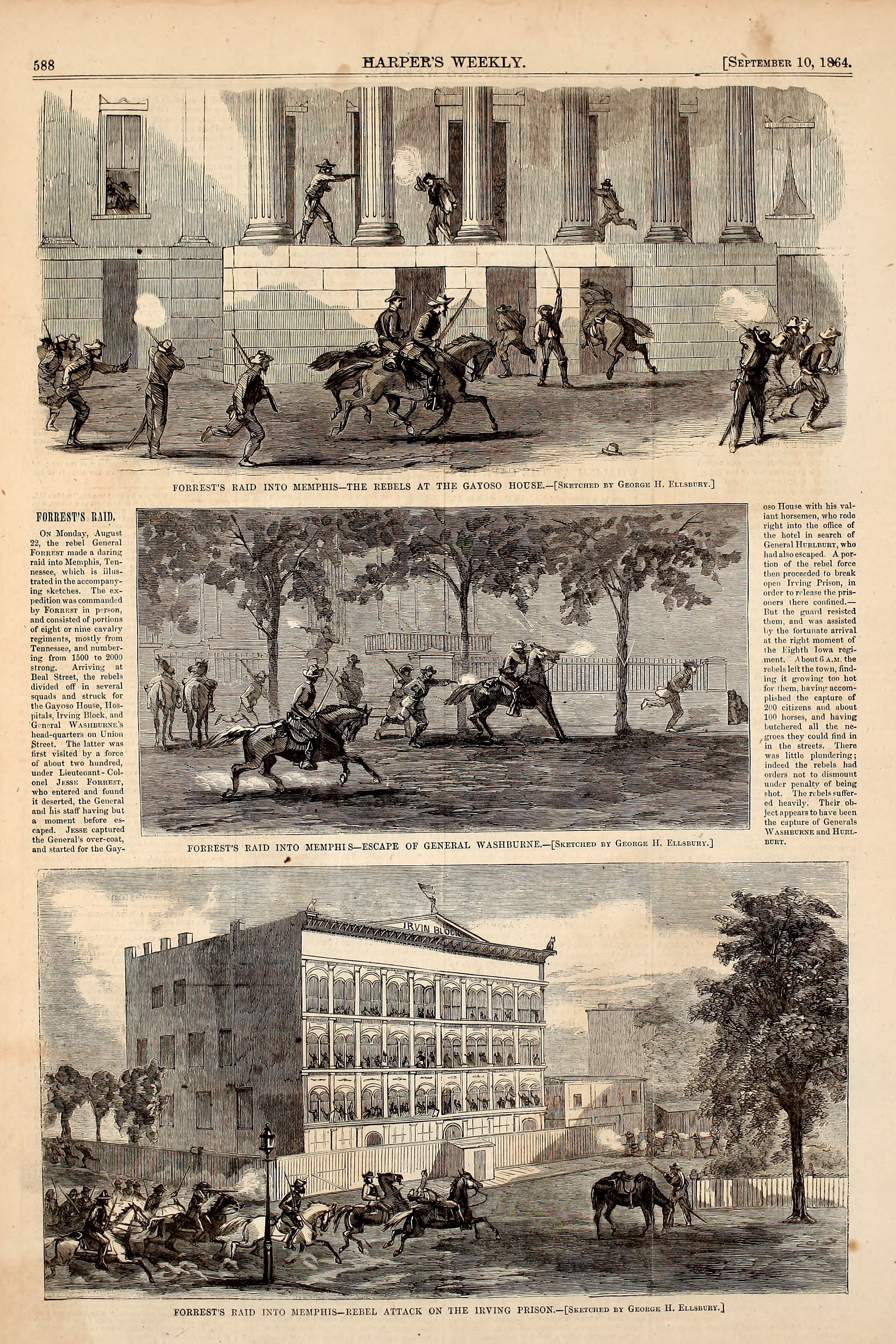
"Forrest's Raid" sketched by George H. Ellsbury (Harper's Weekly, September 10, 1864)

Forrest led other raids that summer and fall, including a famous one into Union Army-held downtown Memphis in August 1864 (the Second Battle of Memphis) and another on a major Union Army supply depot at Johnsonville, Tennessee. On November 4, 1864, during the Battle of Johnsonville, the Confederates shelled the city, sinking three gunboats and nearly thirty other ships and destroying many tons of supplies. During Hood's Tennessee Campaign, he fought alongside General John Bell Hood, the newest commander of the Confederate Army of Tennessee, in the Second Battle of Franklin on November 30. Facing a disastrous defeat, Forrest argued bitterly with Hood (his superior officer) demanding permission to cross the Harpeth River and cut off the escape route of Union Army Maj. Gen. John M. Schofield's army. He eventually made the attempt, but it was too late.

=== Murfreesboro, Nashville, and Selma ===
Map of the Franklin–Nashville campaign including troops commanded by Forrest

After his bloody defeat at Franklin, Hood continued to Nashville. Hood ordered Forrest to conduct an independent raid against the Murfreesboro garrison. After success in achieving the objectives specified by Hood, Forrest engaged Union forces near Murfreesboro on December 5, 1864. In what would be known as the Third Battle of Murfreesboro, a portion of Forrest's command broke and ran. When Hood's battle-hardened Army of Tennessee, consisting of 40,000 men deployed in three infantry corps plus 10,000 to 15,000 cavalry, was all but destroyed on December 15–16, at the Battle of Nashville, Forrest distinguished himself by commanding the Confederate rear guard in a series of actions that allowed what was left of the army to escape. For this, he would later be promoted to the rank of lieutenant general on March 2, 1865. A portion of his command, now dismounted, was surprised and captured in their camp at Verona, Mississippi on December 25, 1864, during a raid of the Mobile and Ohio Railroad by a brigade of Brig. Gen. Benjamin Grierson's cavalry division.

In the spring of 1865, Forrest led an unsuccessful defense of the state of Alabama against Wilson's Raid. His opponent, Union Army Brig. Gen. James H. Wilson, defeated Forrest at the Battle of Selma on April 2, 1865. A week later, General Robert E. Lee surrendered to Grant in Virginia. When he received news of Lee's surrender, Forrest surrendered as well. On May 9, 1865, at Gainesville, Forrest read his farewell address to the men under his command, urging them to "submit to the powers to be, and to aid in restoring peace and establishing law and order throughout the land."

=== War record and promotions ===
- Enlisted as private July 1861. (White's Company "E", Tennessee Mounted Rifles)
- Commissioned as lieutenant colonel, October 1861 (3rd Tennessee Cavalry)
- Promoted to colonel, February 1862
- Battle of Fort Donelson, February 12–16, 1862
- Wounded at Battle of Shiloh, April 6–8, 1862
- Promoted to brigadier general, July 21, 1862
- First Battle of Murfreesboro, July 1862
- Raids in Tennessee, Kentucky, and Mississippi, early December 1862 – early January 1863
- Battle of Day's Gap, April 30 – May 2, 1863
- Assigned to command Forrest's Cavalry Corps, May 1863
- Battle of Chickamauga, September 18–20, 1863
- Promoted to major general, December 4, 1863
- Battle of Paducah, March 25, 1864
- Battle of Fort Pillow, April 12, 1864
- Battle of Brices Crossroads, June 10, 1864
- Battle of Tupelo, July 14–15, 1864
- Raids in Tennessee, August–October 1864
- Battle of Spring Hill, November 29, 1864
- Battle of Franklin, November 30, 1864
- Third Battle of Murfreesboro, December 5–7, 1864
- Battle of Nashville, December 15–16, 1864
- Promoted to lieutenant general, February 28, 1865
- Battle of Selma, April 2, 1865
- Farewell address to his troops, May 9, 1865

== Postwar years and later life ==
=== Business ventures ===
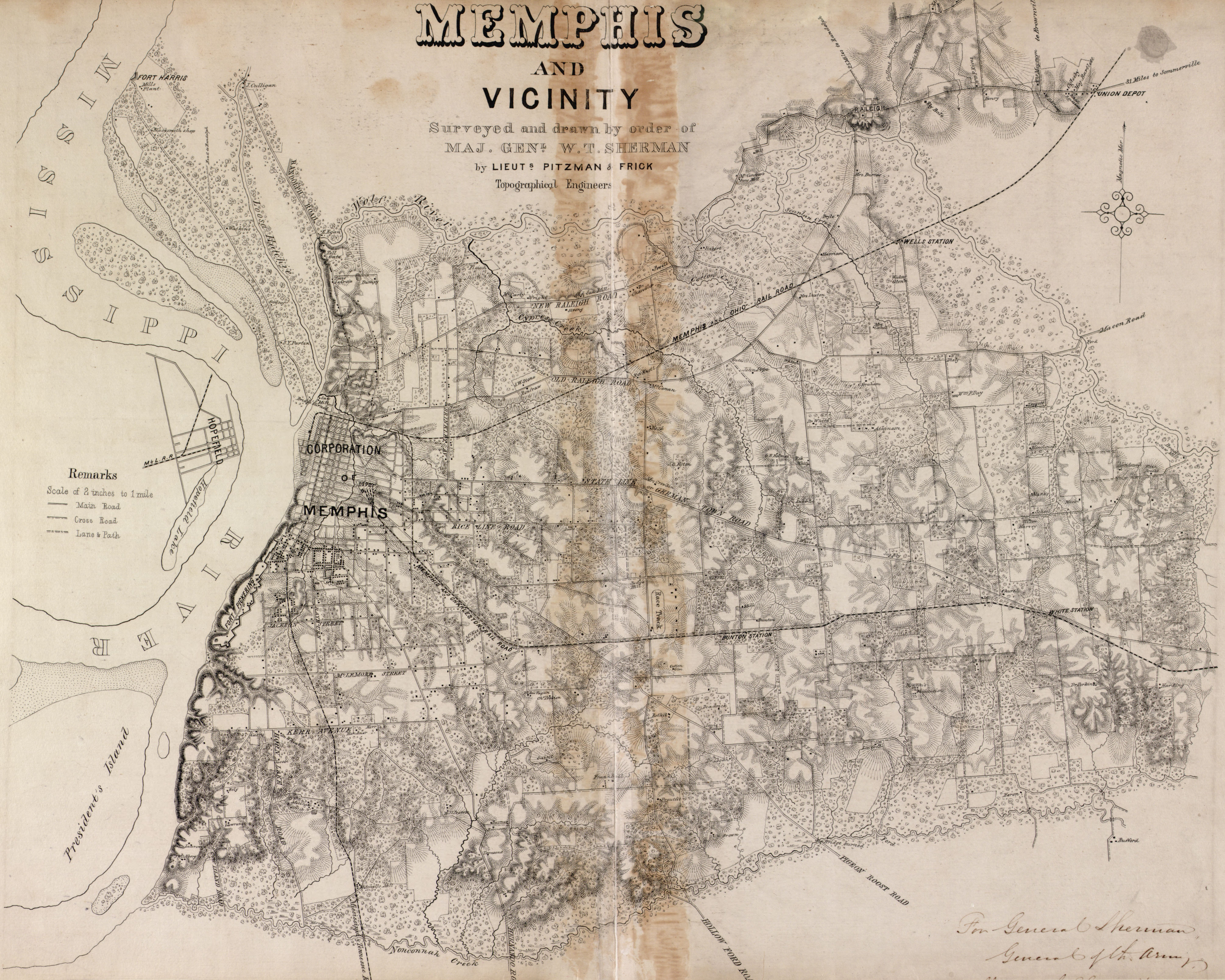
"Memphis and vicinity" mapped during the American Civil War, including President's Island where Forrest's post-war farm was worked by convict labor

As a former slave owner and slave trader, Forrest experienced the abolition of slavery at the war's end as a major financial setback. During the war, he became interested in the area around Crowley's Ridge and took up civilian life in 1865 in Memphis, Tennessee. In 1866, Forrest and C.C. McCreanor contracted to finish the Memphis & Little Rock Railroad, including a right-of-way that passed over the ridge. The ridgetop commissary he built as a provisioning store for the 1,000 Irish laborers hired to lay the rails became the nucleus of a town, which most residents called "Forrest's Town" and which was incorporated as Forrest City, Arkansas in 1870.

The historian Court Carney writes that Forrest was not universally popular in the white Memphis community: he alienated many of the city's business people in his commercial dealings and was criticized for questionable business practices that caused him to default on debts.

He later found employment at the Selma-based Marion & Memphis Railroad and eventually became the company president. He was not as successful in railroad promotion as in war, and, under his direction, the company went bankrupt. Nearly ruined as the result of this failure, Forrest spent his final days running an eight-hundred-acre farm on land he leased on President's Island in the Mississippi River, where he and his wife lived in a log cabin. There, with the labor of over a hundred prison convicts, he grew corn, potatoes, vegetables, and cotton profitably, but his health steadily declined. In May 1877, Forrest's use of convict labor was described as indistinguishable from slavery, in its use of bloodhounds, shotgun-wielding guards, and corporal punishment. Critics also argued it was unjust and exploitative: "The convict farmer has a financial interest in the conviction of as many persons as he may need...and the obsequious and corrupt myrmidons and magistrates of the law can readily supply the demand at a short notice in a country where the unprotected negro is left to steal or starve."

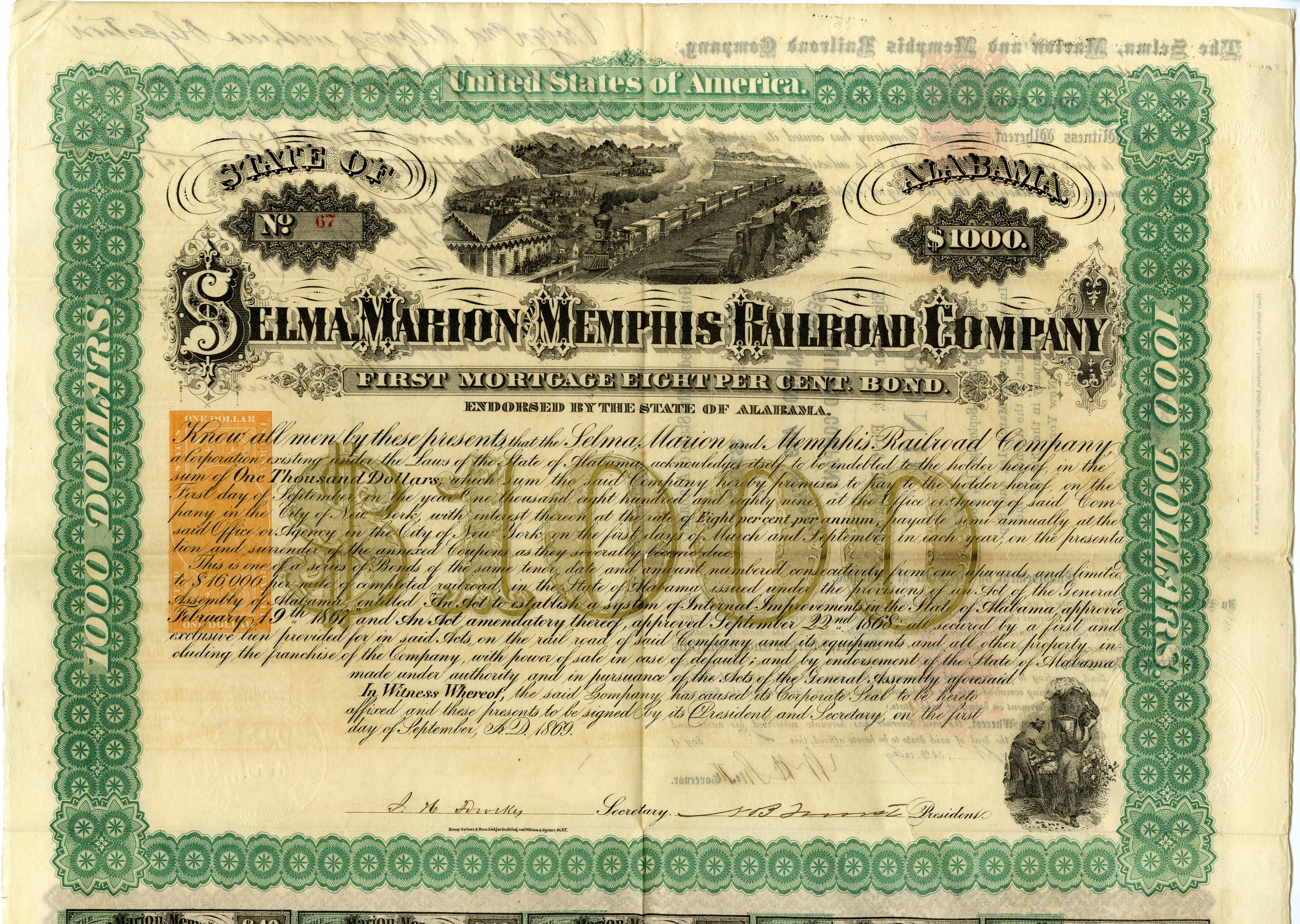
Selma, Marion & Memphis Railroad bonds, issued 1869 by the state of Alabama, signed by N. B. Forrest

=== Offers his services to Sherman ===
During the Virginius Affair of 1873, some of Forrest's old Confederate friends were filibusters aboard the vessel; consequently, he wrote a letter to the then General-in-Chief of the United States Army William T. Sherman and offered his services in case a war were to break out between the United States and Spain. Sherman, who had recognized how formidable an opponent Forrest was in battle during the Civil War, replied after the crisis settled down. He thanked Forrest for the offer and stated that had war broken out, he would have considered it an honor to have served side by side with him.

=== Ku Klux Klan leadership ===
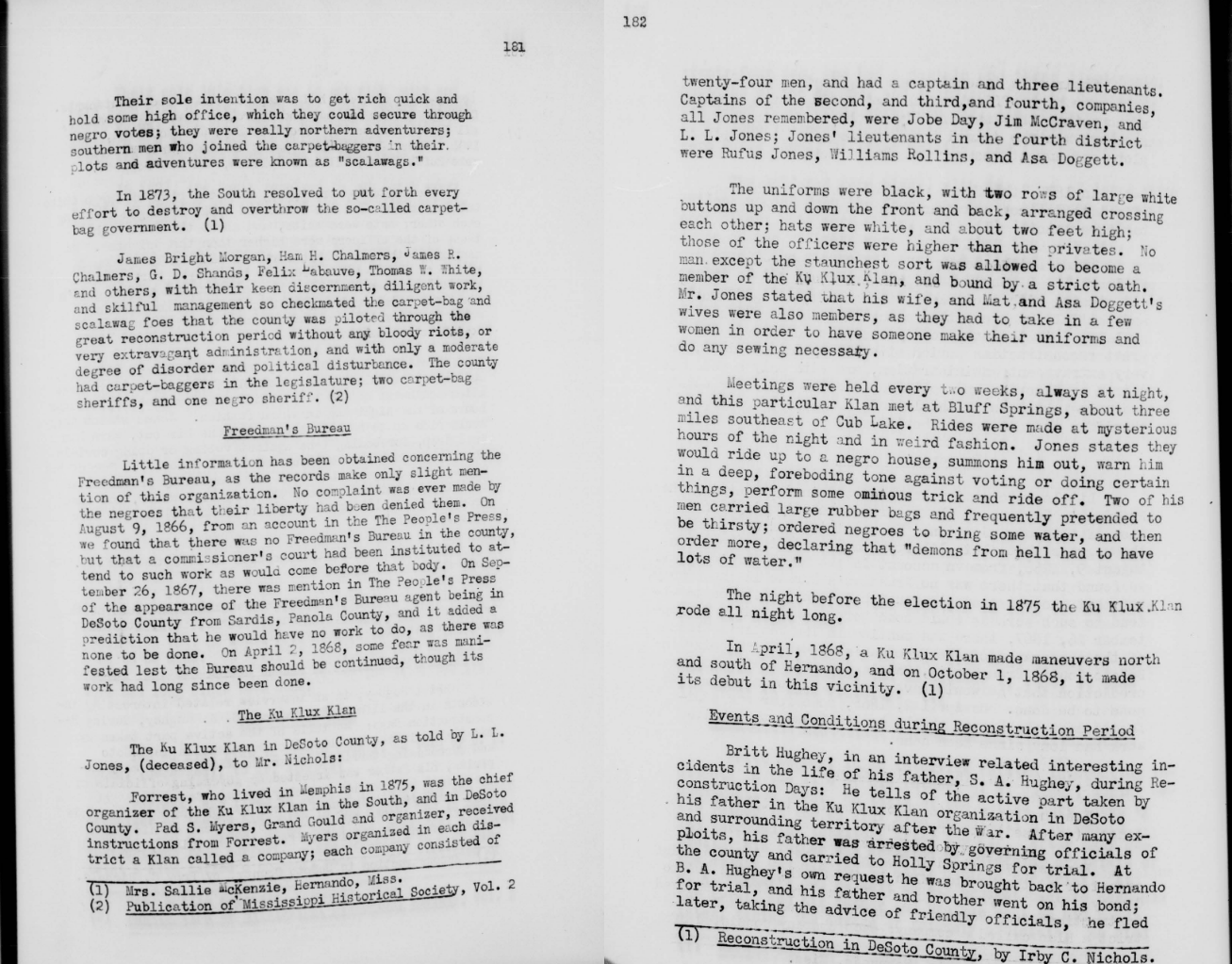
According to a 1938 WPA-produced history of DeSoto County, Mississippi, "Forrest, who lived in Memphis in 1875, was the chief organizer of the Ku Klux Klan in the South, and in DeSoto County. Pad S. Myers, Grand Gould [sic] and organizer, received instructions from Forrest."

Forrest was an early member of the Ku Klux Klan (KKK), which was formed by six veterans of the Confederate Army in Pulaski, Tennessee, during the spring of 1866 and soon expanded throughout the state and beyond. Forrest became involved sometime in late 1866. A common report was that Forrest arrived in Nashville while the Klan was meeting at the Maxwell House Hotel in April 1867, probably at the encouragement of former fellow CSA general, turned state Klan leader, George Gordon. The organization had grown to the point that an experienced commander was needed, and Forrest was well-suited to assume the role. In Room 10 of the Maxwell, Forrest was sworn in as a member by John W. Morton. Brian Steel Wills quotes two KKK members who identified Forrest as a Klan leader. James R. Crowe stated, "After the order grew to large numbers we found it necessary to have someone of large experience to command. We chose General Forrest". Another member wrote, "N. B. Forrest of Confederate fame was at our head, and was known as the Grand Wizard. I heard him make a speech in one of our Dens". The title "Grand Wizard" was chosen because Forrest had been known as "The Wizard of the Saddle" during the war. According to Jack Hurst's 1993 biography, "Two years after Appomattox, Forrest was reincarnated as grand wizard of the Ku Klux Klan. As the Klan's first national leader, he became the Lost Cause of the Confederacy's avenging angel, galvanizing a loose collection of boyish secret social clubs into a reactionary instrument of terror still feared today." Forrest was the Klan's first and only Grand Wizard, and he was active in recruitment for the Klan from 1867 to 1868.

Following the war, the United States Congress began passing the Reconstruction Acts to specify conditions for the readmission of former Confederate States to the United States, including ratification of the Fourteenth (1868), and Fifteenth (1870) Amendments to the United States Constitution. The Fourteenth addressed citizenship rights and equal protection of the laws for formerly enslaved people, while the Fifteenth specifically secured the voting rights of black men. According to Wills, in the August 1867 state elections the Klan was relatively restrained in its actions. White Americans who made up the KKK hoped to persuade black voters that returning to their pre-war state of bondage was in their best interest. Forrest assisted in maintaining order. After these efforts failed, Klan violence and intimidation escalated and became widespread. Author Andrew Ward, however, writes, "In the spring of 1867, Forrest and his dragoons launched a campaign of midnight parades; 'ghost' masquerades; and 'whipping' and even 'killing Negro voters and white Republicans, to scare blacks off voting and running for office'". In 1868, "Klan organizers circulated printed rituals. Forrest and his business partners were then promoting an insurance venture, and their travels facilitated the movement."

In an 1868 interview by a Cincinnati newspaper, Forrest claimed that the Ku Klux Klan had 40,000 members in Tennessee and 550,000 total members throughout the Southern United States. He said he sympathized with them, but denied any formal connection, although he claimed he could muster thousands of men himself. He described the Klan as "a protective political military organization ... The members are sworn to recognize the government of the United States ... Its objects originally were protection against Loyal Leagues and the Grand Army of the Republic ...". After only a year as Grand Wizard, in January 1869, faced with an ungovernable membership employing methods that seemed increasingly counterproductive, Forrest dissolved the Klan, ordered their costumes destroyed, and withdrew from participation. His declaration had little effect, and few Klansmen destroyed their robes and hoods.

In 1871, the U.S. Congressional Committee Report stated that "The natural tendency of all such organizations is to violence and crime, hence it was that Gen. Forrest and other men of influence by the exercise of their moral power, induced them to disband".

==== Democratic convention 1868 ====
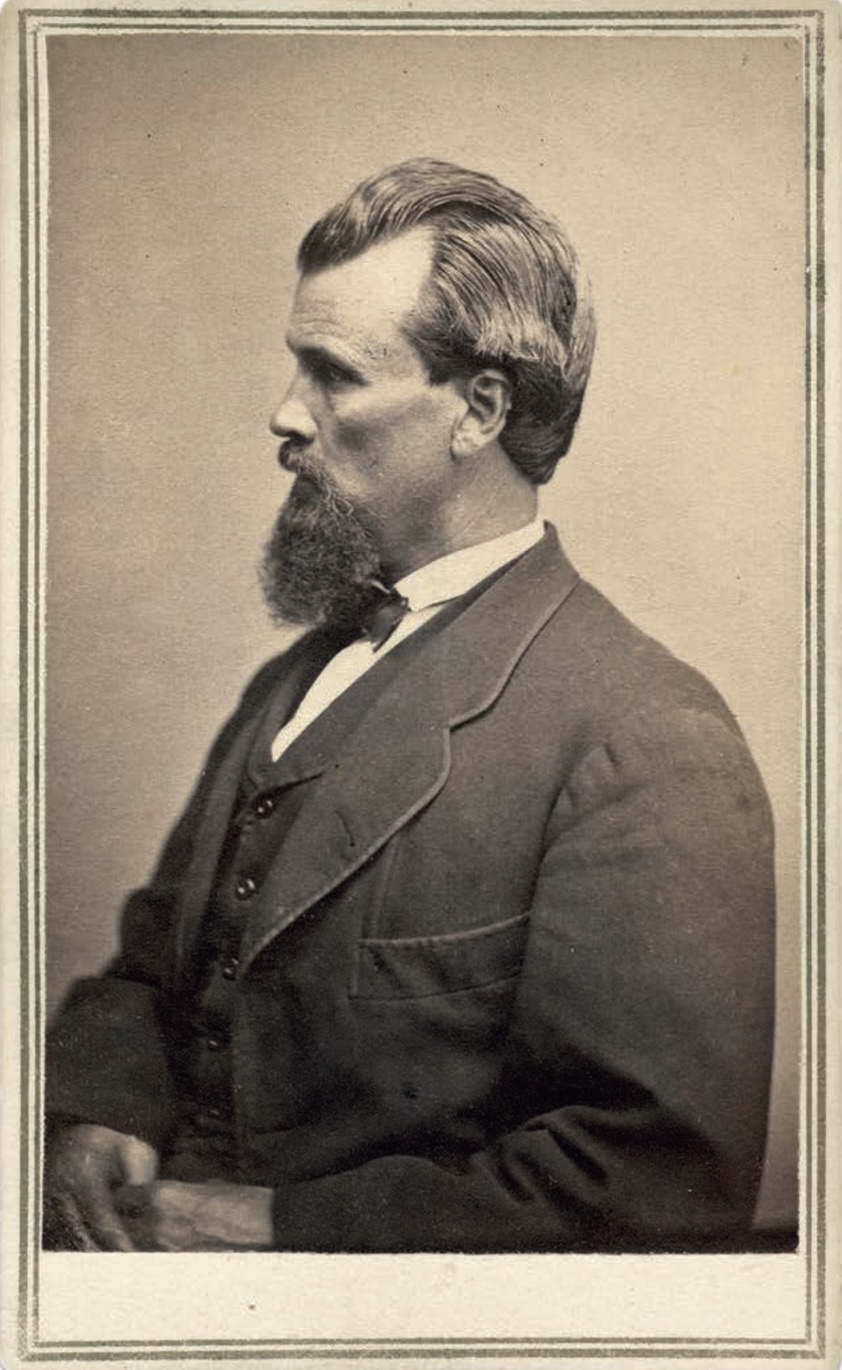
1868 carte de visite of Nathan Bedford Forrest taken by Mathew B. Brady in New York City at the time of the 1868 Democratic Convention (Steve and Mike Romano Collection, Military Images)

The Klan's activity infiltrated the Democratic Party's campaign for the presidential election of 1868. Prominent ex-Confederates, including Forrest, the Grand Wizard of the Klan, and South Carolina's Wade Hampton, attended as delegates at the 1868 Democratic Convention, held at Tammany Hall headquarters at 141 East 14th Street in New York City. Forrest rode to the convention on a train that was stopped just outside of a small town along the way, when he was confronted by a well-known fighter shouting "d[amne]d butcher" and wanting to "thrash" him. When Forrest rose and approached the bully, his larger challenger's "purpose evaporated". Former governor of New York Horatio Seymour was nominated as the Democratic presidential candidate, while Forrest's friend, Francis Preston Blair Jr., was nominated as the Democratic vice presidential candidate, Seymour's running mate. The Seymour–Blair Democratic ticket's campaign slogan was: "Our Ticket, Our Motto, This Is a White Man's Country; Let White Men Rule". The Democratic Party platform denounced the Reconstruction Acts as unconstitutional, void, and revolutionary. The party advocated the termination of the Freedman's Bureau and any government policy designed to aid blacks in the Southern United States. These developments worked to the advantage of the Republicans, who focused on the Democratic Party's alleged disloyalty during and after the Civil War.

==== Election of 1868 and Grant ====
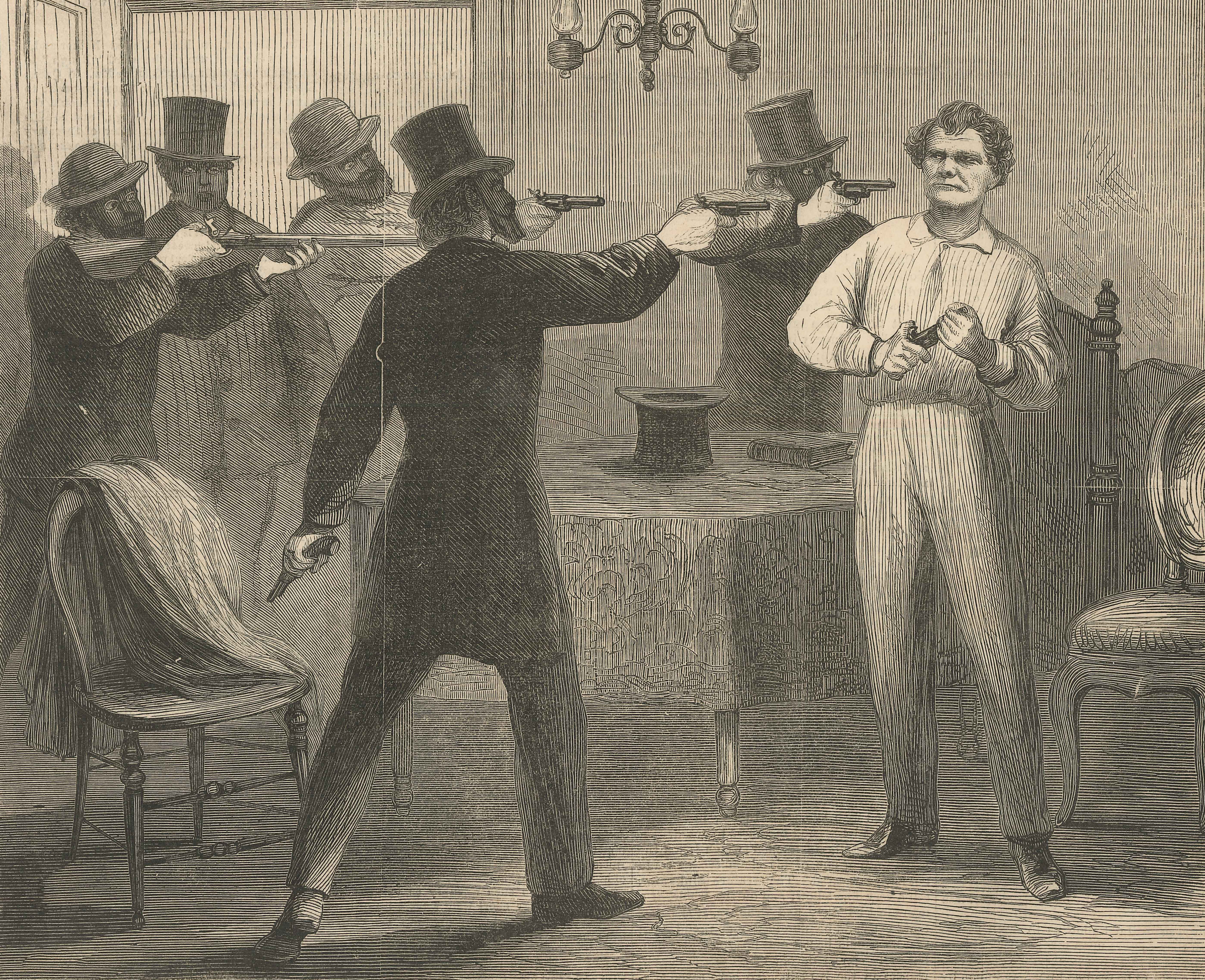
Prominent Republican organizer George Ashburn was murdered in Georgia by the Ku Klux Klan on March 31, 1868.

During the presidential election of 1868, the Ku Klux Klan, under the leadership of Forrest, and other terrorist groups, used brutal violence and intimidation against blacks and Republican voters. Forrest played a prominent role in the spread of the Klan in the Southern United States, meeting with racist whites in Atlanta several times between February and March 1868. Forrest probably organized a statewide Klan network in Georgia during these visits. On March 31, the Klan struck, killing prominent Republican organizer George Ashburn in Columbus.

The Republicans had nominated one of Forrest's battle adversaries, Union war hero Ulysses S. Grant, for the presidency at their convention held in October. Klansmen took their orders from their former Confederate officers. In Georgia, blacks and Republicans also faced a lot of violence. The Klan's violence was primarily designed to intimidate voters, targeting black and white supporters of the Republican Party. The Klan's violent tactics backfired, as Grant, whose slogan was "Let us have peace", won the election and Republicans gained a majority in Congress. Grant defeated Horatio Seymour, the Democratic presidential candidate, by a comfortable electoral margin, 214 to 80. The popular vote was much closer: Grant received 3,013,365 (52.7%) votes, while Seymour received 2,708,744 (47.3%) votes. Grant lost Georgia and Louisiana, where the violence and intimidation against blacks were most prominent.

==== Klan prosecution and Congressional testimony (1871) ====
Many in the United States, including President Grant, backed the passage of the Fifteenth Amendment, which gave voting rights to American men regardless of "race, color, or previous condition of servitude". Congress and Grant passed the Enforcement Acts from 1870 to 1871 to protect the "registration, voting, officeholding, or jury service" of African Americans. Under these laws enforced by Grant and the newly formed Department of Justice, there were over 5,000 indictments and 1,000 convictions of Klan members across the Southern United States.

Forrest testified before the Congressional investigation of Klan activities on June 27, 1871. He denied membership, but his role in the KKK was beyond the scope of the investigating committee, which wrote: "Our design is not to connect General Forrest with this order (the reader may form his own conclusion upon this question)". The committee also noted, "The natural tendency of all such organizations is to violence and crime; hence it was that General Forrest and other men of influence in the state, by the exercise of their moral power, induced them to disband". George Cantor, a biographer of Confederate generals, wrote, "Forrest ducked and weaved, denying all knowledge, but admitted he knew some of the people involved. He sidestepped some questions and pleaded failure of memory on others. Afterwards, he admitted to 'gentlemanly lies'. He wanted nothing more to do with the Klan, but felt honor bound to protect former associates."

==== Race and politics (1870s) ====
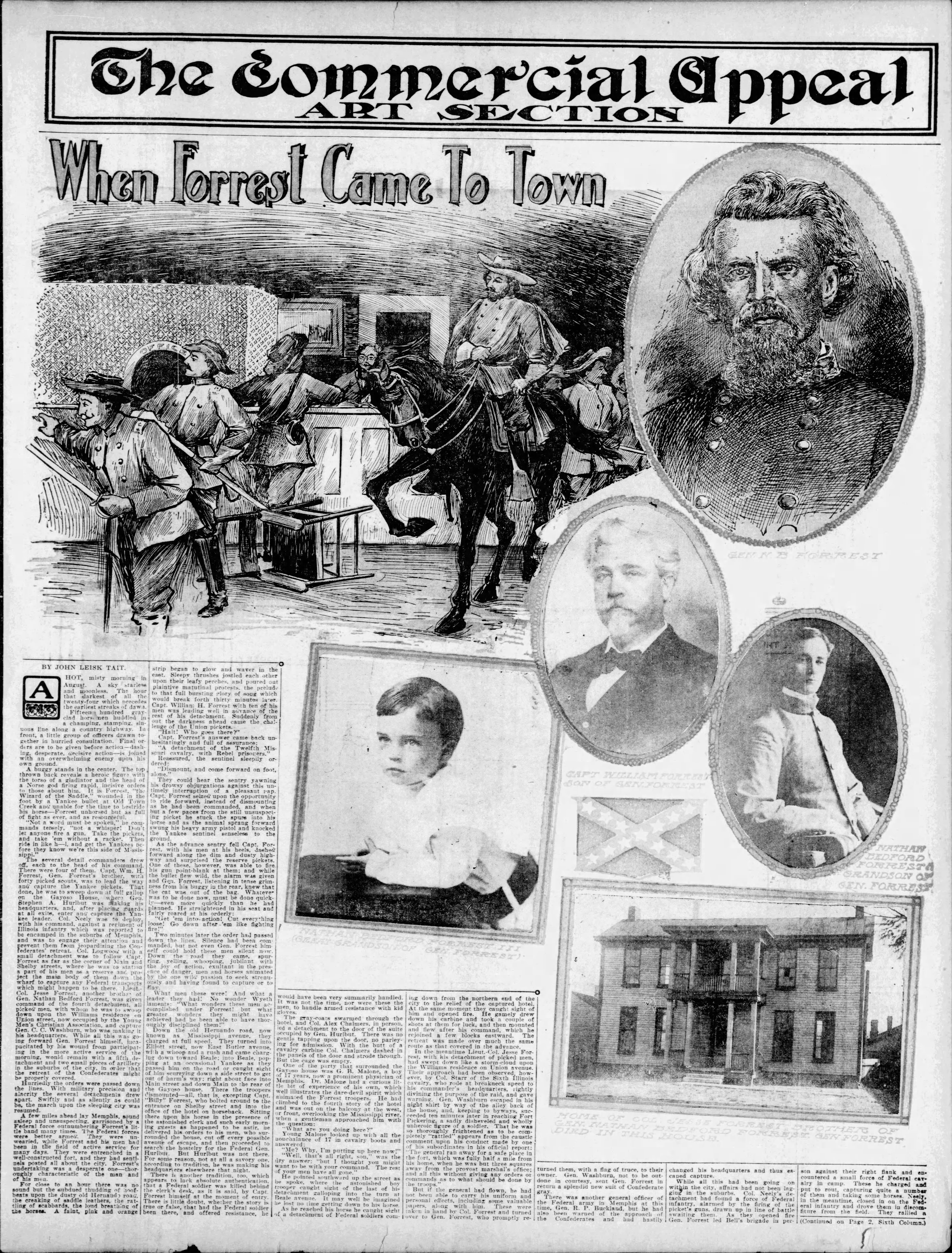
The lionization of Forrest was especially keen during the post-Reconstruction period now known as the nadir of American race relations ("When Forrest Came to Town" Memphis Commercial Appeal, June 14, 1908)

After the lynch mob murder of four black people who had been arrested for defending themselves in a brawl at a barbecue, Forrest wrote to Tennessee governor John C. Brown in August 1874 volunteering to personally lead a posse to punish the "white marauders" responsible. Brown politely declined the offer.

In January 1875, Forrest came to Nashville to work against the re-election of Andrew Johnson for Senate; four of the six other candidates being considered by the Tennessee Assembly were fellow former high officers in the Confederate Army, namely generals John C. Brown, William B. Bate, W. A. Quarles, and Colonel John H. Savage. According to historian Fay W. Brabson, when Forrest arrived Johnson cunningly told him, "When the gods arrive, the half-gods depart; if the people really wanted to bestow honor where honor was due, they should support Forrest for the Senate instead of any one-horse general." Forrest was duly flattered and left town for Memphis that night, leaving the "lesser military contenders" to fight amongst themselves amidst a losing battle with Johnson.

In his last public appearance, Forrest gave a speech on July 5, 1875 before the Independent Order of Pole-Bearers Association, a post-war organization of black Southerners advocating to both improve black people's economic condition and gain equal rights for all citizens. He made what The New York Times described as a "friendly speech" during which, when offered a bouquet by the daughter of a Pole Bearers' officer, he accepted them, thanked the young black woman and kissed her on the cheek. Forrest spoke in encouragement of black advancement and endeavored to be a proponent for espousing peace and harmony between black and white Americans.

In response to the Pole-Bearers speech, the Cavalry Survivors Association of Augusta, the first Confederate organization formed after the war, held a meeting on July 30, 1875 in which Captain Francis Edgeworth Eve, a former enlisted cavalry soldier who had been elected to his rank in the Georgia Hussars, gave a speech expressing strong disapproval of Forrest's remarks promoting inter-ethnic harmony, ridiculing his faculties and judgment and berating the woman who gave Forrest flowers as "a mulatto wench". The association voted unanimously to amend its constitution to expressly forbid publicly advocating for or hinting at any association of white women and girls as being in the same classes as "females of the negro race". The Macon Weekly Telegraph newspaper also condemned Forrest for his speech, describing the event as "the recent disgusting exhibition of himself at the negro jamboree" and quoting part of a Charlotte Observer article, which read "We have infinitely more respect for Longstreet, who fraternizes with negro men on public occasions, with the pay for the treason to his race in his pocket, than with Forrest and [General] Pillow, who equalize with the negro women, with only 'futures' in payment".

=== Death ===
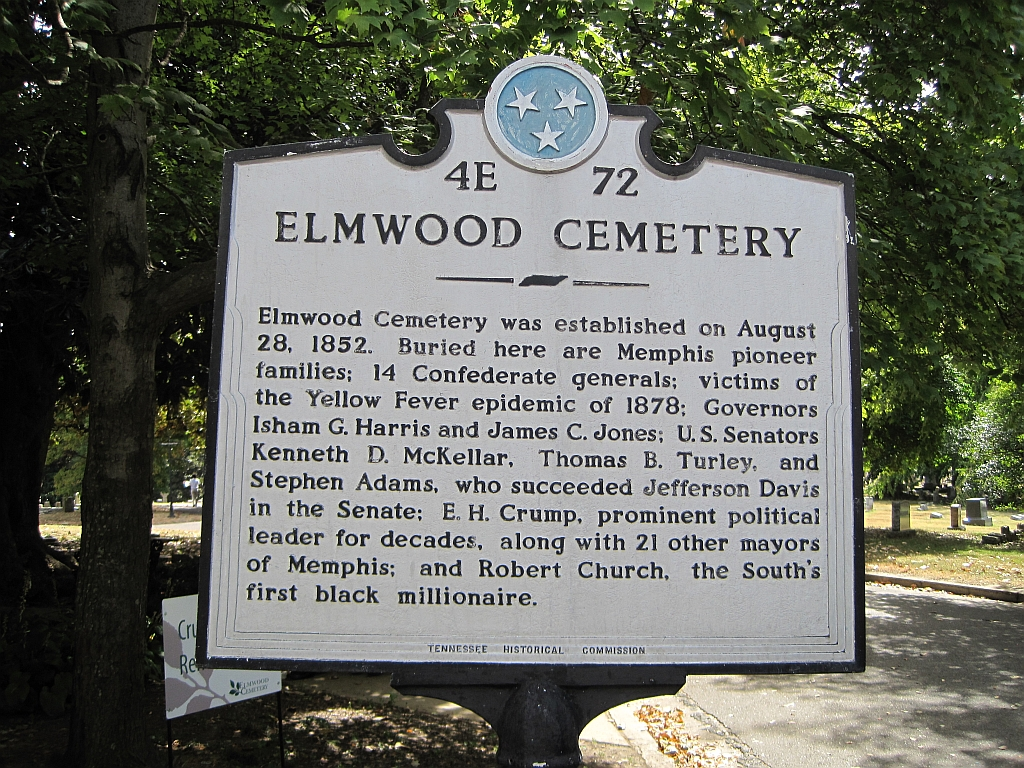
A number of Forrest family members are buried at Memphis' Elmwood Cemetery.

Forrest reportedly died from acute complications of diabetes at the Memphis home of his brother Jesse on October 29, 1877. His eulogy was delivered by his recent spiritual mentor, former Confederate chaplain George Tucker Stainback, who declared in his eulogy: "Lieutenant-General Nathan Bedford Forrest, though dead, yet speaketh. His acts have photographed themselves upon the hearts of thousands, and will speak there forever."

Forrest's funeral procession was over two miles long. The crowd of mourners was estimated to include 20,000 people. According to Forrest biographer Jack Hurst, writers present at the public viewing of Forrest's body and the funeral procession noted many black citizens among them.

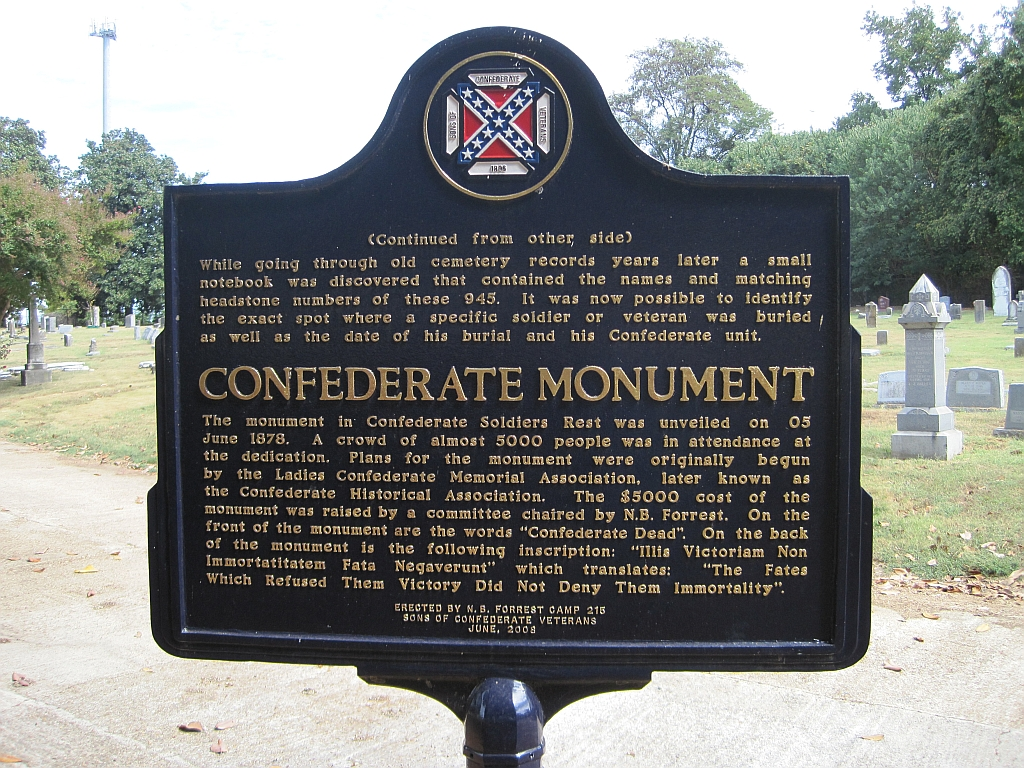
Forrest helped raise money for a Confederate monument at the cemetery.

Forrest was buried on October 30, 1877 at Elmwood Cemetery in Memphis with military honors and rites as a member of the Oddfellows. In 1904, the remains of Forrest and his wife Mary were disinterred from Elmwood and moved to a Memphis city park that was originally named Forrest Park in his honor but has since been renamed Health Sciences Park.

On July 7, 2015, the Memphis City Council unanimously voted to remove the statue of Forrest from Health Sciences Park, and to return the remains of Forrest and his wife to Elmwood Cemetery. However, on October 13, 2017, the Tennessee Historical Commission invoked the Tennessee Heritage Protection Act of 2013 and U.S. Public Law 85-425: Sec. 410 to overrule the city. Consequently, Memphis sold the park land to Memphis Greenspace, a non-profit entity not subject to the Tennessee Heritage Protection Act, which immediately removed the monument as explained below.

== Historical reputation and legacy ==
=== Specific monuments ===
Monuments to Nathan Bedford Forrest
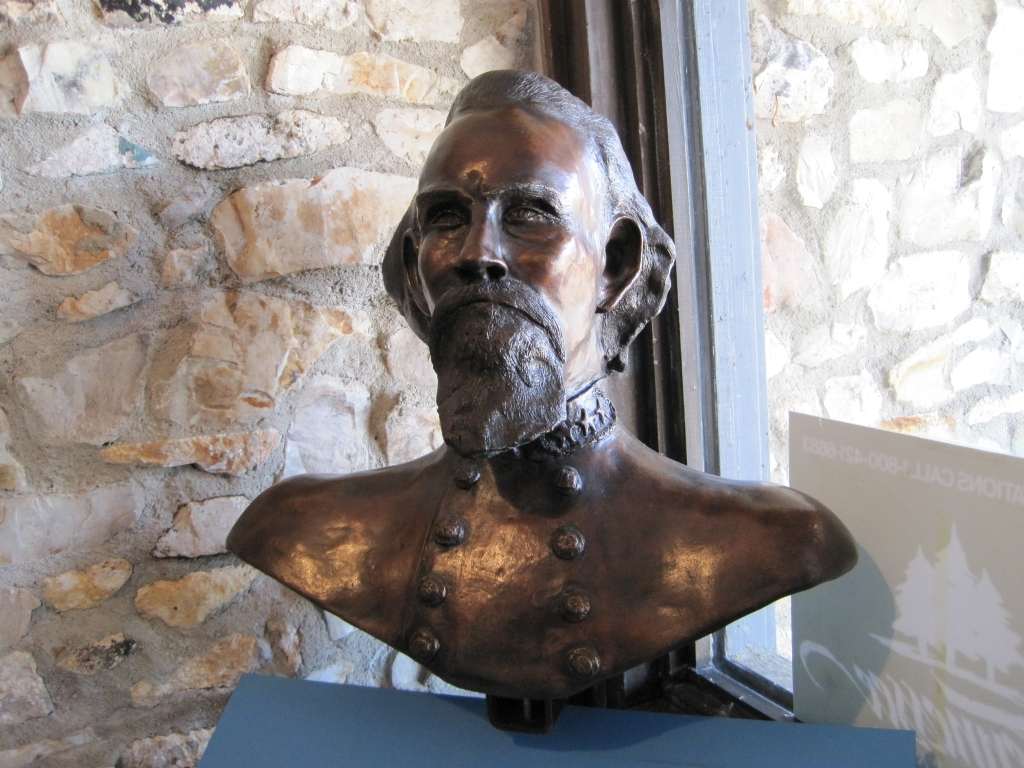
Bronze bust of Forrest at Nathan Bedford Forrest State Park

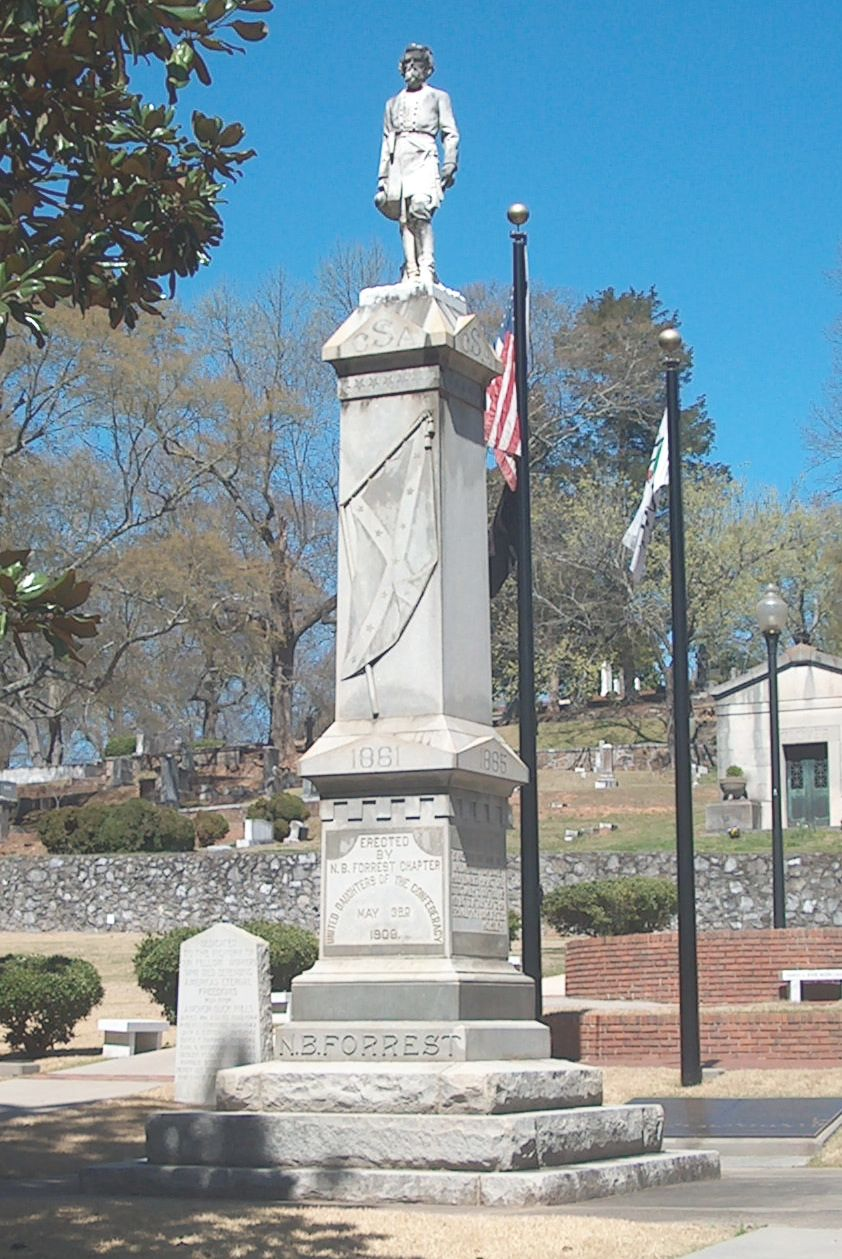
Nathan Bedford Forrest Monument (Rome, Georgia)

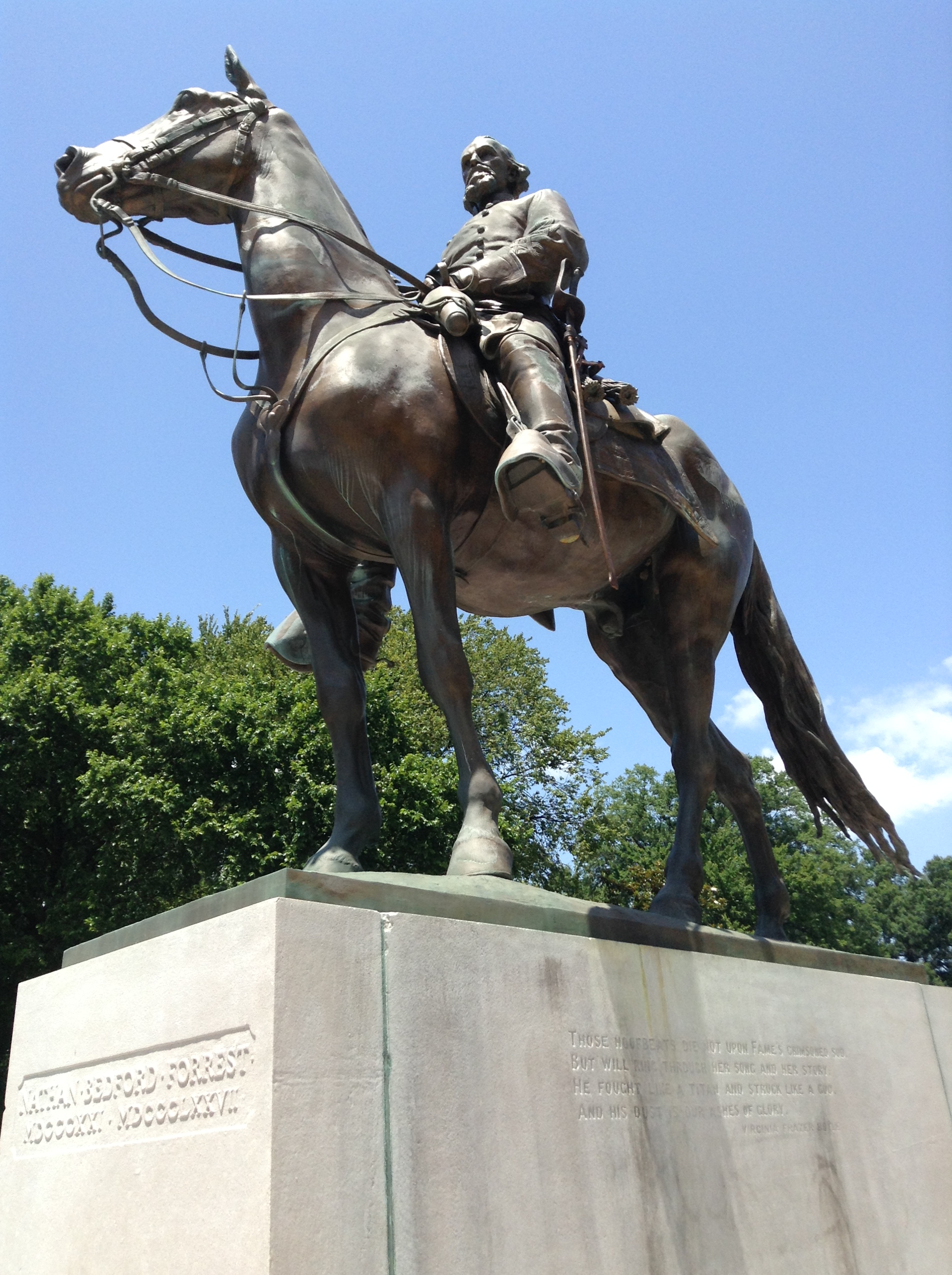
Nathan Bedford Forrest Monument (Memphis, Tennessee)

Many memorials have been erected to Forrest, especially in Tennessee and adjacent southern states. Forrest was elevated in Memphis—where he lived and died—to the status of folk hero. Historian Court Carney suggested that "embarrassed by their city's early capitulation during the Civil War, white Memphians desperately needed a hero and therefore crafted a distorted depiction of Forrest's role in the war." Moreover, a "strong Forrest cult exists among fans of the Lost Cause." Forrest's legacy as "one of the most controversial—and popular—icons of the war" still draws heated public debate. As of 2007, Tennessee had 32 dedicated historical markers linked to Nathan Bedford Forrest, more than were dedicated to all three former Presidents associated with the state combined: Andrew Jackson, James K. Polk, and Andrew Johnson. A Tennessee-based organization, the Sons of Confederate Veterans, posthumously awarded Forrest their Confederate Medal of Honor, created in 1977.

=== Military doctrines ===
Forrest is considered one of the Civil War's most brilliant tacticians by the historian Spencer C. Tucker. Forrest fought by simple rules; he maintained that "war means fighting and fighting means killing" and the way to win was "to get there first with the most men". Union Army General William Tecumseh Sherman called him "that devil Forrest" in wartime communications with Ulysses S. Grant and considered him "the most remarkable man our civil war produced on either side".

Forrest became well known for his early use of maneuver tactics as applied to a mobile horse cavalry deployment. He grasped the doctrines of mobile warfare that would eventually become prevalent in the 20th century. Paramount in his strategy was fast movement, even if it meant pushing his horses at a killing pace, to constantly harass the enemy during raids by disrupting their supply trains and communications with the destruction of railroad tracks and the cutting of telegraph lines, as he wheeled around his opponent's flank. The Civil War scholar Bruce Catton writes:

Forrest ... used his horsemen as a modern general would use motorized infantry. He liked horses because he liked fast movement, and his mounted men could get from here to there much faster than any infantry could; but when they reached the field they usually tied their horses to trees and fought on foot, and they were as good as the very best infantry.

Forrest is often erroneously quoted as saying his strategy was "to git thar fustest with the mostest". Now often recast as "Getting there firstest with the mostest", this misquote first appeared in a New York Tribune article written to provide colorful comments in reaction to European interest in Civil War generals. The aphorism was addressed and corrected as "Ma'am, I got there first with the most men" by a New York Times story in 1918. Though it was a novel and succinct condensation of the military principles of mass and maneuver, Bruce Catton writes of the spurious quote:

Do not, under any circumstances whatever, quote Forrest as saying "fustest" and "mostest". He did not say it that way, and nobody who knows anything about him imagines that he did.

==== Criticism ====
Military historian Christopher Rein takes a dim view of Forrest. While agreeing that Forrest was a skilled cavalryman, perhaps the best on the Confederate side, and tactically shrewd, Rein points out that the latter quality was most evident only in smaller engagements such as the First Battle of Murfreesboro, Brice's Crossroads and Parker's Cross Roads, victories that were strategically peripheral to the Confederate cause and often came through bluffery or at the expense of inferior enemy troops. Forrest's celebrated personal bravery, willingness to lead from the front and get "in the mix" may have earned him considerable admiration in his day from both sides in the war, Rein notes. But those virtues, he continues, are useful to armies when they are demonstrated by junior officers and enlisted men, not generals who must consider the larger picture, as Forrest failed to do when he led troops to Ebenezer Church rather than prepare a more robust defense at Selma, a loss that effectively ended the war as the Union destroyed the Confederacy's last manufacturing center.

As part of larger formations, writes Rein, Forrest's tendency to take the initiative and fight without consulting his superiors hurt the Confederacy more than once. His failures at Chickamauga left Bragg with a more ephemeral victory than he might have otherwise gained, at Tupelo he escaped but at the cost of his ability to mount serious raids on Sherman's supply lines, and Johnsonville, despite its overwhelming success, hurt the Confederacy as it led Hood to delay his advance into Tennessee, allowing Thomas to consolidate his defenses for the Battle of Nashville, where Union victory ended the Army of Tennessee as a force to reckon with, and with it the Confederacy's Western Theater campaign.

In the anthology The Worst Military Leaders in History, Rein further contends that the glorification of Forrest and his tactical brilliance by his many defenders, many like him minimally educated U.S. military cadets from the South who have seen him as also exemplifying the Southern virtues celebrated by the Lost Cause of the Confederacy myth, has had longterm negative effects on U.S. military performance:

... [G]reat leadership is only one aspect of command. Forrest was certainly a skilled tactician, but great commanders must have strategic vision, or some semblance of how their victories translate into successful operations (known as "operational art") and, ultimately, into strategic victory. Otherwise, the commander runs the risk of falling into the same traps set for American commanders in Vietnam or Iraq: winning an unbroken string of tactical victories but never translating those successes into the strategic conditions necessary for a decisive victory.

=== Fort Pillow ===
Modern historians generally believe that Forrest's attack on Fort Pillow was a massacre, noting high casualty rates and the rebels targeting black soldiers. Forrest's claim that the Fort Pillow massacre was an invention of Northern reporters is contradicted by letters written by Confederate soldiers to their own families, which described extreme brutality on the part of Confederate troops. It was the Confederacy's publicly stated position that former slaves firing on whites would be killed on the spot, along with Southern whites that fought for the Union, whom the Confederacy considered traitors. According to this analysis, Forrest's troops were carrying out Confederate policy. The historical record does not support his repeated denials that he knew a massacre was taking place or that he even knew a massacre had occurred at all.

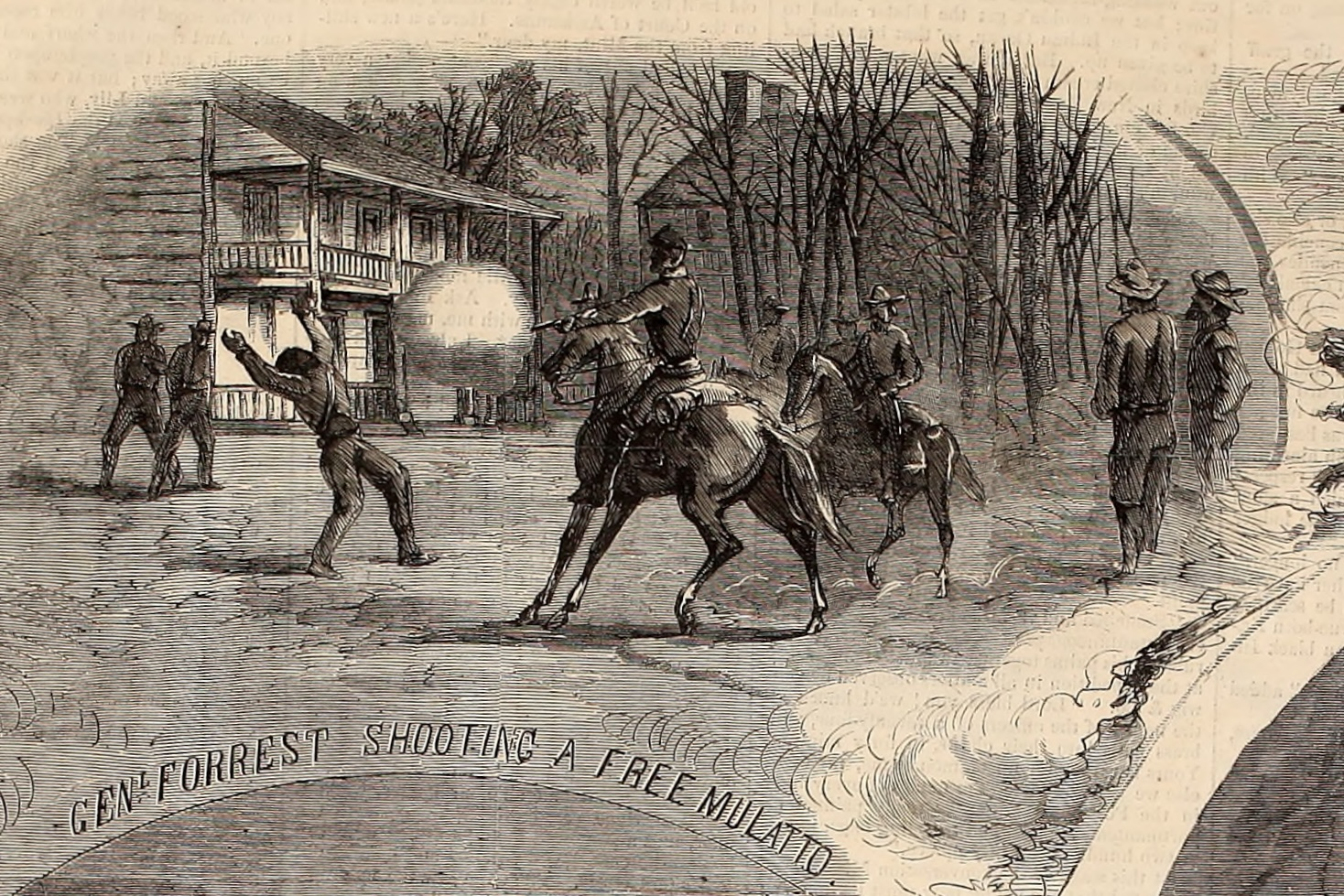
After Fort Pillow, Union Maj. Gen. David S. Stanley published reports describing Forrest's execution of a prisoner of war from Pennsylvania; a news illustrator later created this image captioned "Gen. Forrest Shooting a Free Mulatto" (Harper's Weekly, May 21, 1864)

Consequently, his role at Fort Pillow was a stigmatizing one for him the rest of his life, both professionally and personally, and contributed to his business problems after the war.

Historians have differed in their interpretations of the events at Fort Pillow. Richard L. Fuchs, author of An Unerring Fire, concluded:

The affair at Fort Pillow was simply an orgy of death, a mass lynching to satisfy the basest of conduct—intentional murder—for the vilest of reasons—racism and personal enmity.

Andrew Ward downplays the controversy:

Whether the massacre was premeditated or spontaneous does not address the more fundamental question of whether a massacre took place ... it certainly did, in every dictionary sense of the word.

John Cimprich states:

The new paradigm in social attitudes and the fuller use of available evidence has favored a massacre interpretation ... Debate over the memory of this incident formed a part of sectional and racial conflicts for many years after the war, but the reinterpretation of the event during the last thirty years offers some hope that society can move beyond past intolerance.

The site is now a Tennessee State Historic Park.

Grant himself described Forrest as "a brave and intrepid cavalry general" while noting that Forrest sent a dispatch on the Fort Pillow Massacre "in which he left out the part which shocks humanity to read".

=== In popular culture ===
- In the 1990 PBS documentary The Civil War by Ken Burns, historian Shelby Foote states in Episode 7 that the Civil War produced two "authentic geniuses": Abraham Lincoln and Nathan Bedford Forrest. When he expressed his opinion to one of Forrest's granddaughters, she replied after a pause, "You know, we never thought much of Mr. Lincoln in my family". Foote also made Forrest a major character in his novel Shiloh, which used numerous first-person stories to illustrate a detailed timeline and account of the battle.
- Tom Hanks's title character in the film Forrest Gump remarks in one scene that his mother named him after Nathan Bedford Forrest and "we was related to him in some way". The following scene satirically depicts Hanks as Forrest in a Ku Klux Klan outfit, donning a hood and being superimposed into scenes of the Klan from The Birth of a Nation.
- In Paul Thomas Anderson's 2025 film, One Battle After Another, antagonist/white supremacist Steven J. Lockjaw (Sean Penn) is shown receiving the "Bedford Forrest Medal of Honor" in recognition of his role in hunting down and killing members of the racially diverse revolutionary group "The French 75".

== See also ==
- Leaders of the Ku Klux Klan
- List of Confederate generals
- List of Tennessee slave traders

== Bibliography ==
- Adler, John (2022). America's Most Influential Journalist and Premier Political Cartoonist: The Life, Times and Legacy of Thomas Nast. Sarasota, Florida: Harpweek LLC. ISBN 978-0-578-29454-4.
- Ashdown, Paul; Caudill, Edward (2006). The Myth of Nathan Bedford Forrest. Rowman & Littlefield. ISBN 978-0-7425-4301-0.
- Ashdown, Paul; Caudill, Edward (2008). "What Can We Say of Such a Hero?". In Sachsman, David B.; Rushing, S. Kittrell; Morris, Roy (eds.). Words at War: The Civil War and American Journalism. Purdue University Press. ISBN 978-1-55753-494-1.
- Axelrod, Alan (2011). Generals South, Generals North: The Commanders of the Civil War Reconsidered. Rowman & Littlefield. ISBN 978-0-7627-7488-3. Archived from the original on May 9, 2024.
- Bailey, Ronald H. (1985). Battles for Atlanta: Sherman Moves East. Time Life Books. ISBN 978-0-8094-4773-2.
- Ballard, Michael B. (2011). The Civil War in Mississippi: Major Campaigns and Battles. Jackson, Mississppi: Mississippi Historical Society. ISBN 978-1-60473-842-1.
- Bancroft, Frederic (2023) [1931]. Slave-Trading in the Old South. Southern Classics Series. Introduction by Michael Tadman. University of South Carolina Press. ISBN 978-1-64336-427-8.
- Barney, William L. (2011). The Oxford Encyclopedia of the Civil War (Revised and updated ed.). London: Oxford University Press. ISBN 978-0-19-978201-7.
- Bartoletti, Susan Campbell (2010). They Called Themselves the K.K.K.: The Birth of an American Terrorist Group. Houghton Mifflin Harcourt. ISBN 978-0-547-48803-5.
- Beck, Brandon H. (2016). Streight's Foiled Raid on the Western & Atlantic Railroad: Emma Sansom's Courage and Nathan Bedford Forrest's Pursuit. Arcadia Publishing Inc. ISBN 978-1-62585-355-4.
- Bergeron, Paul H., ed. (1989). The Papers of Andrew Johnson: May–August 1865. Vol. 8. Knoxville, Tennessee: University of Tennessee Press. ISBN 978-0-87049-613-4.
- Boatner, Mark M. III (1988). The Civil War Dictionary (Revised ed.). New York: David McKay. ISBN 978-0-8129-1726-0.
- Bobrick, Benson (2010). The Battle of Nashville. New York: Alfred A. Knopf Books for Young Readers. ISBN 978-0-375-84887-2.
- Brabson, Fay Warrington (1972). Andrew Johnson: a life in pursuit of the right course, 1808–1875: the seventeenth President of the United States. Durham, North Carolina: Seeman Printery. OCLC 590545.
- Browning, Robert M. (2004). Forrest: The Confederacy's Relentless Warrior. Potomac Books, Inc. ISBN 978-1-57488-624-5. Archived from the original on May 9, 2024.
- Bryant, Jonathan M. (October 3, 2002). "Ku Klux Klan in the Reconstruction Era". georgiaencyclopedia.org. Georgia Southern University.
- Buhk, Tobin T. (2012), True Crime in the Civil War: Cases of Murder, Treason, Counterfeiting, Massacre, Plunder & Abuse, Mechanicsville, PA: Stackpole Books, ISBN 978-0-8117-1019-0
- Burkhardt, George S. (2007). Confederate Rage, Yankee Wrath: No Quarter in the Civil War. Carbondale, Illinois: Southern Illinois University Press. ISBN 978-0-8093-8954-4.
- Burns, William S. (2004). "The Battle of Tupelo". In Cozzens, Peter; Girardi, Robert I. (eds.). The New Annals of the Civil War. Mechanicsburg, Pennsylvania: Stackpole Books. ISBN 978-0-8117-4645-8.
- Busbee, Westley F. Jr. (2015). Mississippi: A History (2nd ed.). Wiley. ISBN 978-1-118-75592-1.
- Calhoun, Charles W. (2017). The Presidency of Ulysses S. Grant. Lawrence, KS: University Press of Kansas. ISBN 978-0700624843.
- Cantor, George (2000). Confederate Generals: Life Portraits. Dallas, Texas: Taylor Trade Pub. ISBN 978-0-87833-179-6.
- Carey, Bill (2018). Runaways, Coffles and Fancy Girls: A History of Slavery in Tennessee. Nashville, Tennessee: Clearbrook Press. ISBN 978-0-9725680-4-3.
- Catton, Bruce (1971), The Civil War, American Heritage Press, New York. LCCN 77-119671
- Chalmers, James R. (October 1879). "Lieutenant-General N. B. Forrest and His Campaigns". Southern Historical Society Papers. 7 (10): 449–486.
- Chernow, Ron (2017). Grant. New York: Penguin Press. ISBN 978-1-5942-0487-6.
- Cimprich, John (2005). Fort Pillow, a Civil War Massacre, and Public Memory. Baton Rouge: Louisiana State University Press. ISBN 978-0-8071-3110-7.
- Cimprich, John; Mainfort, Robert C. (December 1982). "Fort Pillow Revisited: New Evidence about an Old Controversy". Civil War History. 28 (4): 293–306. doi:10.1353/cwh.1982.0009. S2CID 145324569.
- Clark, Achilles V. (June 1985), Pomeroy, Dan E. (ed.), "A Letter of Account", Civil War Times Illustrated, 24 (4): 24–25
- Conway, Alan (1966). Reconstruction of Georgia. Minneapolis: University of Minnesota Press. ISBN 978-0-8166-0392-3.
- Current, Richard Nelson (1992). Lincoln's Loyalists: Union Soldiers from the Confederacy. Northeastern University Press. ISBN 978-1-55553-124-9.
- Davison, Eddy W.; Foxx, Daniel (2007). Nathan Bedford Forrest: In Search of the Enigma. Pelican Publishing. ISBN 978-1-58980-415-9.
- Davis, William C.; Pohanka, Brian C.; Troiani, Don, eds. (1997). Civil War Journal: The leaders. Nashville, Tennessee: Rutledge Hill Press. ISBN 978-1-55853-437-7.
- Dobak, William A. (2011). Freedom by the Sword: The U.S. Colored Troops 1862–1867 (PDF). Washington, D.C.: Center of Military History, U.S. Army. ISBN 978-0-16-086695-1.
- Dougherty, Kevin (2010). Weapons of Mississippi. Jackson, Mississippi: University Press of Mississippi. ISBN 978-1-60473-452-2.
- Dougherty, Kevin (2015). The Vicksburg Campaign: Strategy, Battles and Key Figures. Jefferson, North Carolina: McFarland. ISBN 978-0-7864-9797-3.
- Durham, Walter T. (1985). Nashville, the Occupied City: The First Seventeen Months, February 16, 1862, to June 30, 1863. Nashville, Tennessee: Tennessee Historical Society. OCLC 12864467.
- Eicher, David J. (2001). The Longest Night: A Military History of the Civil War. Simon and Schuster. ISBN 978-0-7432-1846-7.
- Eicher, John H.; Eicher, David J (2001), Civil War High Commands, Stanford University Press, ISBN 978-0-8047-3641-1
- Fitzgerald, M.W. (2017). Reconstruction in Alabama: From Civil War to Redemption in the Cotton South. Baton Rouge: Louisiana State University Press. ISBN 978-0-8071-6606-2.
- Foote, Shelby (1974), The Civil War: A Narrative – III: Red River to Appomattox, Random House, ISBN 978-0-394-74622-7
- Franklin, John Hope (1994). Reconstruction After the Civil War (Second ed.). University of Chicago Press. ISBN 978-0-226-26079-2.
- Fuchs, Richard L. (2001). An Unerring Fire: The Massacre at Fort Pillow. Mechanicsburg, Pennsylvania: Stackpole Books. ISBN 978-0-8117-1824-0.
- Gentry, Claude (1972). General Nathan Bedford Forrest: The Boy and the Man. Baldwyn, Mississippi: Magnolia Publishers. OCLC 1982146.
- Gildrie, Richard P. (1990). "Guerrilla Warfare in the Lower Cumberland River Valley, 1862–1865". Tennessee Historical Quarterly. 49 (3): 161–176. ISSN 0040-3261. JSTOR 42626879.
- Gitlin, Marty (2009). The Ku Klux Klan: A Guide to an American Subculture. Santa Barbara, California: ABC-CLIO. ISBN 978-0-313-36576-8.
- Grant, Ulysses Simpson (1895). Personal Memoirs of U.S. Grant (New ed.). London: Sampson Low, Marston & Company. OCLC 223150569.
- Gwynne, S. C. (2020). Hymns of the Republic: The Story of the Final Year of the American Civil War. New York: Scribner. ISBN 978-1-5011-1623-0.
- Hale, Sheffield (2023). "Challenging Historical Remembrance, Myth, and Identity: The Confederate Monuments Debate". In Allison, David B. (ed.). Controversial Monuments and Memorials: A Guide for Community Leaders (2nd ed.). Lanham, Maryland: Rowman & Littlefield. ISBN 978-1-5381-7381-7.
- Hawkins, A.W.R. III; Pierpaoli, Paul G. Jr.; Tucker, Spencer C. (2014). "Forrest, Nathan Bedford (1821–1877)". In Tucker, Spencer C. (ed.). 500 Great Military Leaders. Vol. 1. ABC-CLIO. ISBN 978-1-59884-758-1.
- Head, Thomas A. (1885). Campaigns and Battles of the Sixteenth Regiment, Tennessee Volunteers, in the War Between the States: With Incidental Sketches of the Part Performed by Other Tennessee Troops in the Same War. 1861–1865. Nashville, Tennessee: Cumberland Presbyterian publishing house. OCLC 4613109.
- Henry, Robert Selph (1991) [1944]. "First with the Most" Forrest. New York: Mallard Press. ISBN 978-0-7924-5605-6.
- Horn, Stanley F. (1993) [1941]. The Army of Tennessee. Norman, Oklahoma: University of Oklahoma Press. ISBN 978-0-8061-2565-7.
- Huebner, Timothy S. (March 2023). "Taking Profits, Making Myths: The Slave Trading Career of Nathan Bedford Forrest". Civil War History. 69 (1): 42–75. doi:10.1353/cwh.2023.0009. ISSN 1533-6271. S2CID 256599213.
- Hurst, Jack (1993). Nathan Bedford Forrest: A Biography. New York: Knopf. ISBN 978-0394551890.
- Hurst, Jack (2008). Men of Fire: Grant, Forrest, and the Campaign That Decided the Civil War. New York: Basic Books. ISBN 978-0-465-00847-6.
- Isbell, Timothy T. (2007). Shiloh and Corinth: Sentinels of Stone. Jackson, Mississippi: University Press of Mississippi. ISBN 978-1-934110-08-9.
- Jones, James Pickett (2015). Yankee Blitzkrieg: Wilson's Raid through Alabama and Georgia. Lexington, Kentucky: University Press of Kentucky. ISBN 978-0-8131-6164-8.
- Jones, Robert C. (2017). Alabama and the Civil War: A History & Guide. Charleston, South Carolina: Arcadia Publishing Inc. ISBN 978-1-4396-6075-1.
- Jones, Terry L. (2010). The American Civil War. Boston: McGraw-Hill. ISBN 978-0-07-302204-8.
- Jones, Wilmer L. (2006). Generals in Blue and Gray: Davis's Generals. Mecanicsburg, Pennsylvania: Stackpole Books. ISBN 978-1-4617-5105-2.
- Jordan, Thomas; Pryor, J. P. (1868). The Campaigns of Lieut.-Gen. N.B. Forrest, and of Forrest's Cavalry. New Orleans, Louisiana: Blelock & Company. OCLC 2685597.
- Knight, James R. (2014). Hood's Tennessee Campaign: The Desperate Venture of a Desperate Man. Charleston, South Carolina: The History Press. ISBN 978-1-62585-130-7.
- Krolick, Marshall D. (2008). "Brig. Gen. Abraham H. Buford". In Allardice, Bruce S.; Hewitt, Lawrence Lee (eds.). Kentuckians in Gray: Confederate Generals and Field Officers of the Bluegrass State. Lexington, Kentucky: University Press of Kentucky. ISBN 978-0-8131-2475-9.
- Lardas, Mark (2017). Nashville 1864: From the Tennessee to the Cumberland. London: Bloomsbury Publishing. ISBN 978-1-4728-1983-3.
- Martinez, J. Michael (2007). Carpetbaggers, Cavalry, and the Ku Klux Klan: Exposing the Invisible Empire During Reconstruction. Lanham, Maryland: Rowman & Littlefield. ISBN 978-0-7425-5078-0.
- Martinez, J. Michael (2012). Terrorist Attacks on American Soil From the Civil War Era to the Present. Lanham, Maryland: Rowman & Littlefield. ISBN 978-1-4422-0324-2.
- Mathes, James Harvey (1902). General Forrest. New York: D. Appleton and Company. OCLC 613153932.
- McKim, Randolph Harrison (1912). The Numerical Strength of the Confederate Army. New York: Neale Publishing Company. OCLC 1839410.
- Miers, Earl S. (1984). The Web of Victory: Grant at Vicksburg. Baton Rouge, Louisiana: Louisiana State University Press. ISBN 978-0-8071-1199-4.
- Millar, G. Lee (2018). Forrest Stories: Humor of Bedford Forrest and His Cavalry. AuthorHouse. ISBN 978-1-5462-3556-9.
- Mitcham, Samuel W. (2016). Bust Hell Wide Open: The Life of Nathan Bedford Forrest. Regnery Publishing. ISBN 978-1-62157-600-6. Archived from the original on May 9, 2024.
- Mooney, Chase C. (1971) [1957]. Slavery in Tennessee. Westport, Connecticut: Indiana University Press. hdl:2027/inu.32000002020263. ISBN 978-0-8371-5522-7 – via HathiTrust.
- Moore, James (1866). A Complete History of the Great Rebellion: Or, The Civil War in the United States, 1861–1865. Comprising a Full and Impartial Account of the Various Battles, Bombardments, Skirmishes, Etc., which Took Place on Land and Water; the Whole Embracing a Complete History of the War for the Union – also Biographical Sketches of the Principal Actors in the Great Drama. New York: Hurst & Co. OCLC 9023648.
- Morton, John Watson (1909). The Artillery of Nathan Bedford Forrest's Cavalry: 'the Wizard of the Saddle'. Nashville, Tennessee: Publishing house of the M.E. Church, South, Smith & Lamar, agents. OCLC 1591230.
- Newton, Michael (2014). White Robes and Burning Crosses: A History of the Ku Klux Klan from 1866. Jefferson, NC: McFarland. ISBN 978-0-7864-7774-6. Archived from the original on May 9, 2024.
- Parsons, Elaine Frantz (2015). Ku-Klux: The Birth of the Klan during Reconstruction. Chapel Hill, North Carolina: University of North Carolina Press. ISBN 978-1-4696-2542-3.
- Philpott, Don (2016). Critical Government Documents on Law and Order. Bernan Press. ISBN 978-1-59888-784-6.
- Powell, David (2010). Failure in the Saddle: Nathan Bedford Forrest, Joe Wheeler, and the Confederate Cavalry in the Chickamauga Campaign. New York: Savas Beatie. ISBN 978-1-61121-056-9.
- Powell, David (2016). The Chickamauga Campaign, Barren Victory: The Retreat into Chattanooga, the Confederate Pursuit, and the Aftermath of the Battle, September 21 to October 20, 1863. New York: Savas Beatie. ISBN 978-1-61121-329-4.
- Quarles, Chester L. (1999). The Ku Klux Klan and Related American Racialist and Antisemitic Organizations: A History and Analysis. Jefferson, North Carolina: McFarland. ISBN 978-0-7864-0647-0.
- Rein, Christopher M. (2022). "Nathan Bedford Forrest". In Jennings, John M.; Steele, Chuck (eds.). The Worst Military Leaders in History. London: Reaktion Books. ISBN 9781789145830.
- Rose, Laura Martin (1914). The Ku Klux Klan or Invisible Empire. New Orleans, Louisiana: L. Graham co. p. 22. OCLC 3332047 – via Internet Archive.
- Ross, D. Reid (2008). Lincoln's Veteran Volunteers Win the War: The Hudson Valley's Ross Brothers and the Union's Fight for Emancipation. SUNY Press. ISBN 978-0-7914-7641-3.
- Schroeder-Lein, Glenna R.; Zuczek, Richard (2001). Andrew Johnson: A Biographical Companion. ABC-CLIO. ISBN 978-1-57607-030-7.
- Smith, Michael Thomas (2014). The 1864 Franklin-Nashville Campaign: The Finishing Stroke. Santa Barbara, California: ABC-CLIO. ISBN 978-0-313-39235-1.
- Spaulding, Thomas M. (1931), "Forrest, Nathan Bedford", in Allen Johnson; Dumas Malone (eds.), Dictionary of American Biography, vol. 6, New York: Charles Scribner's Sons, pp. 532–533
- Starr, Stephen Z. (1985). The Union Cavalry in the Civil War: The War in the West, 1861–1865. Vol. 3. Baton Rouge: Louisiana State University Press. ISBN 978-0-8071-3293-7.
- Summers, Mark Wahlgren (2014). The Ordeal of the Reunion: A New History of Reconstruction. Chapel Hill, North Carolina: University of North Carolina Press. ISBN 978-1-4696-1758-9.
- Tabbert, Mark A. (2006). American Freemasons: Three Centuries of Building Communities. Lexington, Massachusetts: National Heritage Museum. ISBN 978-0-8147-8292-7.
- Tap, Bruce (2013). The Fort Pillow Massacre: North, South, and the Status of African Americans in the Civil War Era. Routledge. ISBN 978-1-136-17390-5.
- Trelease, Allen W. (1971). White Terror: The Ku Klux Klan Conspiracy and Southern Reconstruction. New York: Harper & Row. ISBN 978-0-8071-1953-2. OCLC 136081.
- Tucker, Spencer C. (2014). Battles That Changed American History: 100 of the Greatest Victories and Defeats. Santa Barbara, California: ABC-CLIO. ISBN 978-1-4408-2862-1.
- United States Department of the Navy (1914). Official Records of the Union and Confederate Navies in the War of the Rebellion, Series I Volume 26. Washington, DC: United States Government Printing Office.
- United States Department of War (1891). The War of the Rebellion: A Compilation of the Official Records of the Union and Confederate Armies. Vol. XXIII, Part I–Reports. Washington, DC: United States Government Printing Office.
- Wade, Wyn Craig (1998) [1987]. The Fiery Cross: The Ku Klux Klan in America. Oxford University Press. ISBN 978-0-19-512357-9.
- Ward, Andrew (2005). River Run Red: The Fort Pillow Massacre in the American Civil War. Viking. ISBN 978-0-670-03440-6.
- Welsh, Jack D. (1999). Medical Histories of Confederate Generals. Kent State University Press. ISBN 978-0-87338-649-4.
- Wicker, R. F. Jr. (Spring 1998). "John Emasy Beck: Grandfather of Nathan Bedford Forrest" (PDF). Ansearchin' News. Vol. 45, no. 1.
- Wiecek, William M. (2010). "Emancipation and Civic Status: The American Experience, 1865-1915". In Tsesis, Alexander (ed.). The Promises of Liberty: The History and Contemporary Relevance of the Thirteenth Amendment. Columbia University Press. ISBN 978-0-231-52013-3.
- Wills, Brian Steel (1992). A Battle from the Start: The Life of Nathan Bedford Forrest. New York: HarperCollins. ISBN 978-0-06-016832-2.
- Wills, Brian Steel (2014). The River Was Dyed with Blood: Nathan Bedford Forrest and Fort Pillow. Norman, Oklahoma: University of Oklahoma Press. ISBN 978-0-8061-4453-5.
- Winik, Jay (2002). April 1865: The Month That Saved America. New York: Harper Perennial. ISBN 978-0-06-093088-2.
- Wright, John D. (2001), The Language of the Civil War, Greenwood Publishing Group, ISBN 978-1573561358
- Wyeth, John Allan (1989) [1959]. That Devil Forrest. Baton Rouge: Louisiana State University Press. ISBN 978-0-8071-1578-7.
- Yale, Wesley W. Yale; White, Isaac Davis; Manteuffel, Hasso von (1970). Alternative to Armageddon: The Peace Potential of Lightning War. New Brunswick, New Jersey: Rutgers University Press. ISBN 978-0-8135-0666-1.
- Young, Bennett Henderson (1914). Confederate Wizards of the Saddle: Being Reminiscences and Observations of One who Rode with Morgan. Boston, Massachusetts: Chapple Publishing Company, Limited. OCLC 1576566.
