= J. B. Blanding =

U.S. soldier and murder victim (1841–1866)

- Portrait of Jabez B. Blanding, Carpenter House Museum, Rehoboth, Massachusetts
- Born: August 5, 1841; Providence, Rhode Island, U.S.
- Died: May 1, 1866 (aged 24); Grenada, Mississippi, U.S.

Lt. J. B. Blanding (August 5, 1841 – May 1, 1866), born Jabez Bullock Blanding, was a disabled combat veteran of the American Civil War and an agent of the Freedmen's Bureau in the United States who was assassinated by white Mississippians in Grenada, Yalobusha County in April 1866. Blanding was shot three times (twice in the head, once in the back) while on an evening walk. There is a 50-page file on the murder of Blanding in the records of the Freedmen's Bureau; the gunman was likely "Young" Tom Wilson, aided and abetted by local gang leader Bill Forrest (brother of Nathan Bedford Forrest). No one was ever charged with Blanding's murder, in part due to witness intimidation.

== Life ==
J. B. Blanding was born in Providence, Rhode Island in 1841, the son of William and Mary R. (Bullock) Blanding. Blanding attended Providence public schools and was working as a clerk when the American Civil War began. He served as a private in the First Rhode Island Detached Militia before he enlisted in the U.S. Army in 1861. Initially a second lieutenant, he was promoted to first lieutenant in November 1862. He served in Company G of the 3rd Regiment, Rhode Island Heavy Artillery, and was "badly wounded in the left arm" at the Battle of Pocotaligo Bridge. A newspaper article 30 years after the fact reported that while "serving a battery of heavy guns from the deck of the steamer Planter, at the Battle of Pocotaligo, he was severely wounded by a rifle ball which entered the left arm near the shoulder, causing a compound fracture, and, passing into the left side, lodged near the spine, remaining there 18 months before it was extracted." (Note: According to the regimental history, "In the battle a little drummer-boy of the 48th New York, on board the Planter, attracted the attention of all on the vessel by his superior soldierly record. Seeing Lieutenant Blanding sorely wounded and disabled from using his weapons, the lad obtained the Lieutenant's pistol, and coolly taking the most advantageous position possible, took deliberate aim and emptied every barrel in the face of the foe.")

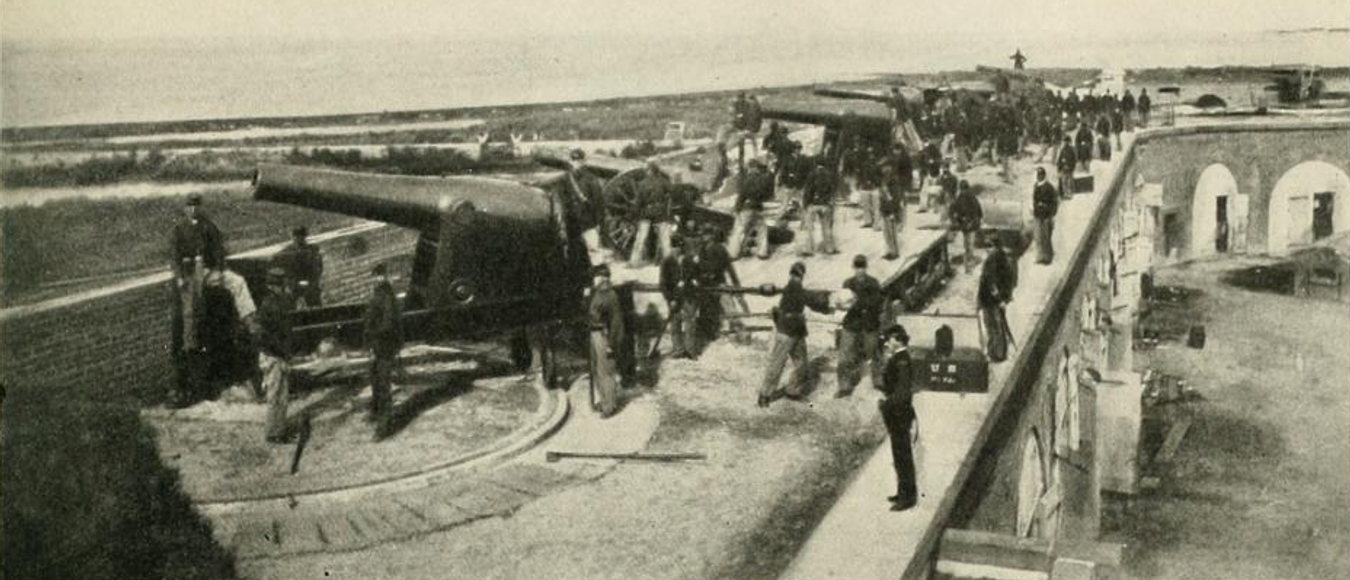
The 3rd Rhode Island Heavy Artillery drilling at re-captured Fort Pulaski, a strategically significant fort at Savannah harbor in Georgia

Per the 1892 account, "After lying in the hospital at Fort Pulaski for a time Blanding received a leave of absence and returned home, remaining there until March. He then returned to his regiment still suffering from the effects of his wound." Blanding was later feted at a regimental celebration as "the star of the R.I. Boys." Blanding was injured again when "the boat he was on was blown up on a reconnoitering trip up the Coosaw River." The regimental history described Blanding's actions after a Confederate shell hit the magazine of their transport, the George Washington, which wrecked on April 9, 1863.

Lieutenant Blanding, Mr. Martin, and our two brave men, D. A. Sisson and A. F. Randall, heroically stood by the wounded men and the crippled boat, resolved to do or die in performing their whole duty, but soon perceiving that the shattered vessel was on fire, called to the row-boat on shore to rescue the wounded. Amid the screeching missiles a black man by order of Lieutenant Smith, brought the row-boat to their relief. Into this were carefully put the wounded that were living. Then our men looked to their safety. Lieutenant Blanding, still suffering in his unhealed, shrivelled, helpless left arm, shot in action in the preceding October, at Pocotaligo, by desperate effort of paddling and pushing, urged the boatload of wounded men beyond the reach of the flames, towards the shore; but, finally, in crossing a small inner channel, he could not lift himself again into the boat, and was obliged to drop his hold and strike out with his one arm to save his life; and, though he went down twice, he at last reached land.

The ship sank, the rowboat floated downstream and was captured, the survivors that made it to shore were aided by "the colored soldiers (1st South Carolina Colored Infantry Regiment) picketing the island." Blanding, praised for his "intrepidity and fidelity," was sent north to recuperate where "he was detailed as an inspector in the provost-marshal general's department." Per the regimental history, "...on account of the loss of the use of his arm from the battle of Pocotaligo, resigned his place amongst us to accept a commission as First Lieutenant in the Veteran Reserve Corps...He was almost idolized by Company G, and beloved by the whole regiment. A more gallant officer never drew sword. The loss of his arm was his full justification for retiring from the front to a more quiet position among those whose losses of limbs were their enduring proofs of noble conduct."

== Murder ==
=== Background ===
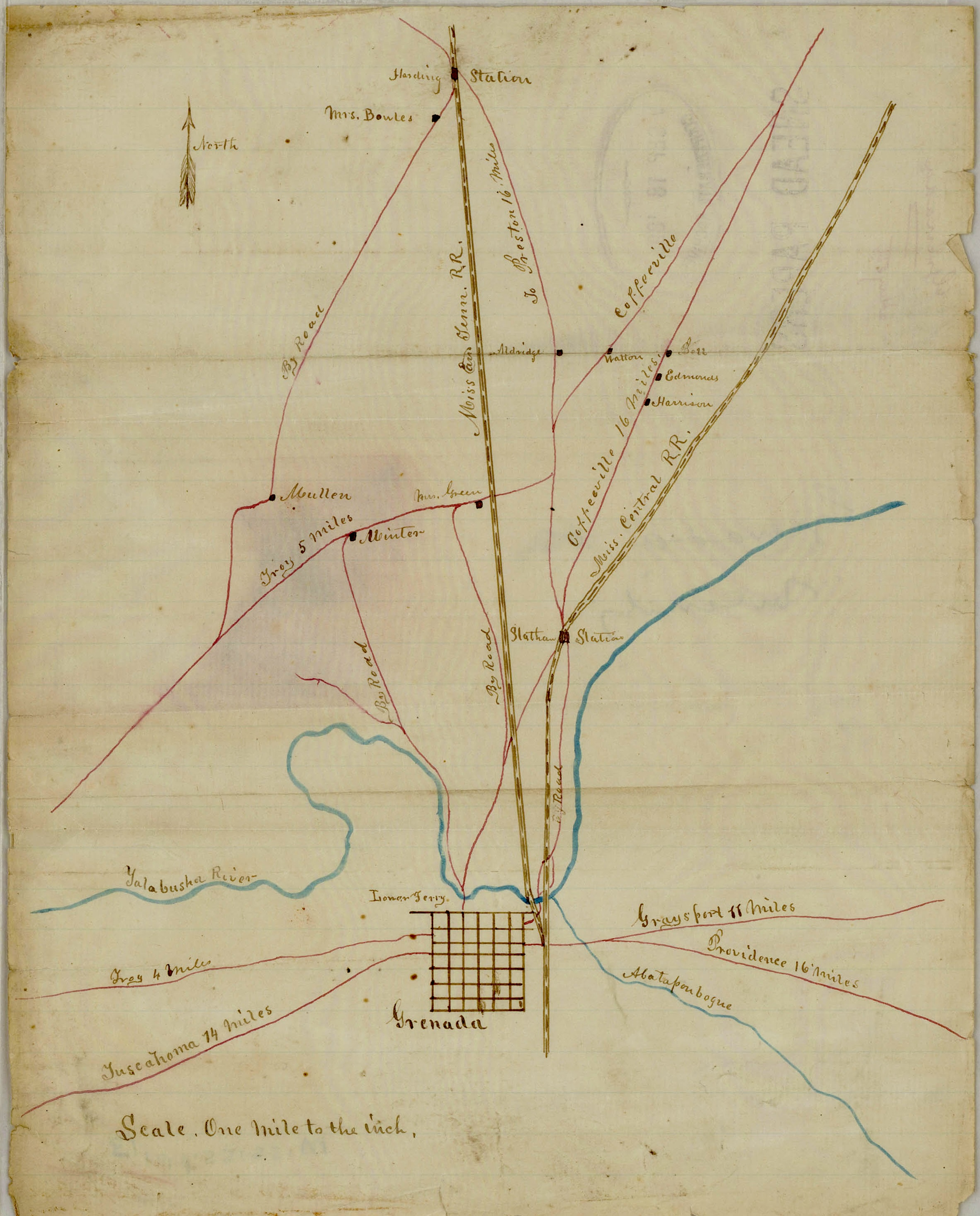
"Sketch of the Vicinity of Grenada, Mississippi" created 1862 (Confederate Maps collection, U.S. War Dept.)

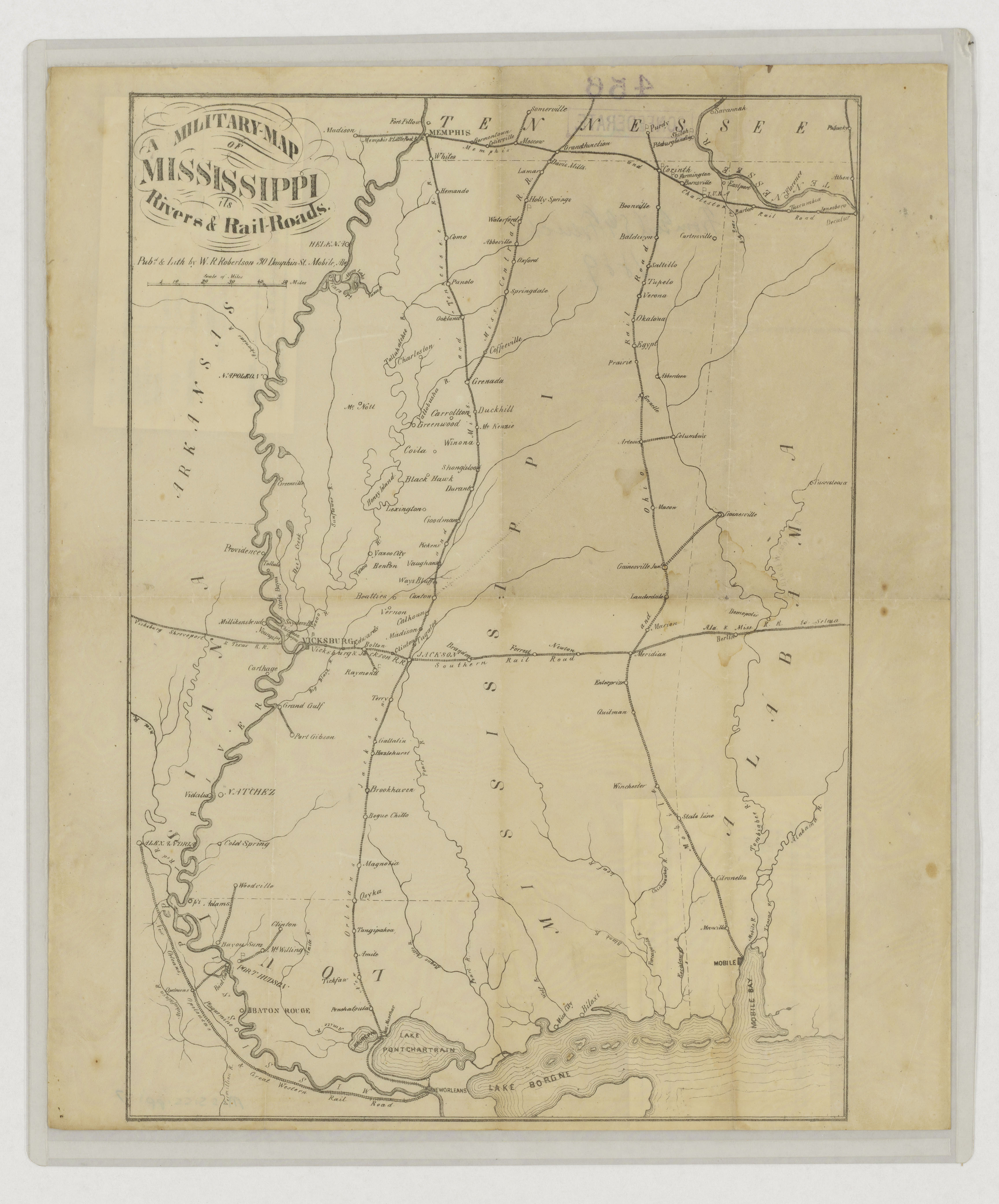
"Military Map of Mississippi by W.R. Robertson" showing Grenada at the intersection of Mississippi and Tennessee and Mississippi Central railroads (Confederate Maps collection, U.S. War Dept.)

Blanding joined the Freedmen's Bureau after the end of the war, and was appointed sub-commissioner of the Grenada, Mississippi office on March 23, 1866. His first assignment was a county of about 16,000 people in a cotton district where two railroads from Tennessee met at a wye. (Note: Grenada County, Mississippi was established in 1870.) Blanding was part of the Veterans Reserve Corps, and according to a history of that service, "Any VRC officer serving with the bureau risked [violence] if he tried to do his job. The white South was far from pacified during the late 1860s, and veteran officers were well aware of the situation in which they found themselves. More than a salary of US$1,000 (equivalent to $21,989 in 2025) to US$1,200 (equivalent to $26,386 in 2025) per annum kept these men on duty in the face of the dangers and hardships they encountered."

Recollections of 19th-century Grenada, Mississippi, which were recorded in the 1920s, briefly mention the Freedmen's Bureau and described a large U.S. Army garrison in the town:

After Green's death and the negro soldiers were removed from Grenada, 2,000 Yankee soldiers were stationed here. They lived in barracks back of and on the lot now owned by Mr. Honeycutt. There was always a fuss down there and nearly every night a Yankee or a negro would be killed. With the army came the officers and agents of the Freedmen's Bureau that had been established by Congress. Its officers and agents were principally clerks from the quartermaster and commissary department or sutlers who had been in the army and had been thrown out of employment when the troops mustered out of service. They were, in general, a very low class of people, prejudiced against the white people of Mississippi. The town was flooded with carpetbaggers who wanted offices and tried to swindle the negro and white out of everything they possibly could. Their presence in the state created differences between the races where up to that time, the best feelings had prevailed.

This account of "2,000 Yankees" stationed in Grenada, killing each other and various freedmen on the regular, conflicts (numerically at least), with a communication of Major Thomas J. Wood in Vicksburg, who reported having "one small battalion of regulars, numbering considerably less than 300 men for duty" across the Mississippi district.

=== April 30–May 1 ===
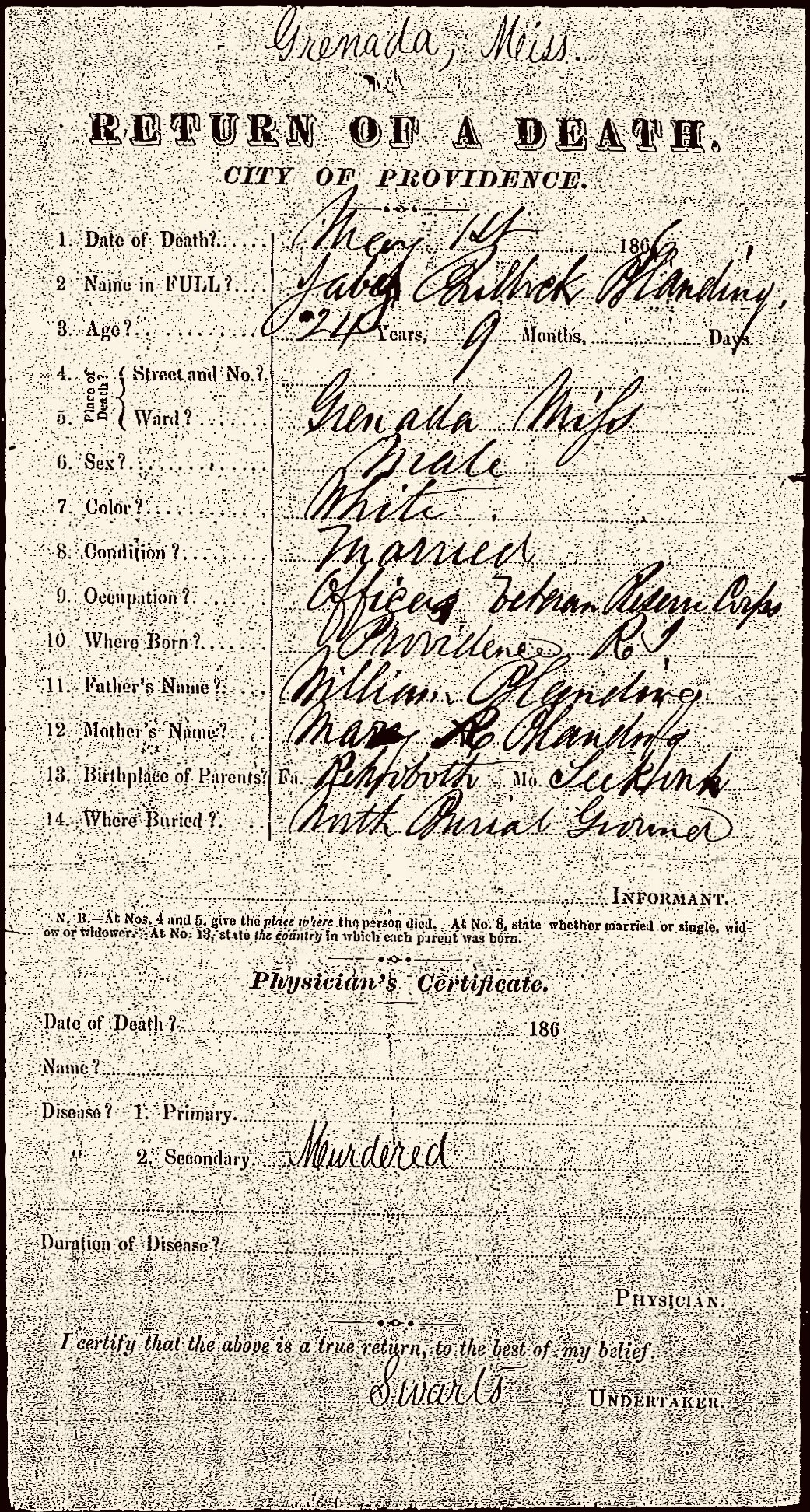
Death record in Rhode Island for Jabez Bullock Blanding

Blanding was shot by white Mississippians shortly after 7:30 p.m. on the evening of Monday, April 30, 1866. The circumstances were that "he was invited to a walk after supper and had gone but a short distance when a pistol was placed near his head and without a moment's warning three shots were fired at him, each taking effect...No cause was given for this cowardly and brutal act." The shooting took place near the Woodroof & Co. building in front of a "10-pin alley" along the edge of the town square. One account said three men were involved. Two bullets struck him in the head and one entered into his back. He survived long enough to make a dying declaration about his own murder. Blanding died at 10:30 the next morning. The regional sub-commissioner reporting Blanding's murder also said that he and anyone deemed "Yankee" was in grave danger in Grenada, and that the teachers at the school for newly emancipated black children were also "not safe." This was known to him because "as Blanding lay dying, 'a committee of citizens' paid a call on his captain to warn him 'that the teachers must leave, and that if he himself did not leave he would be killed next.'"

Two days later the Memphis Daily Post reported:

Murder and Brutal Assault at Grenada. — An officer of the regular service coming North from New Orleans learned in passing Grenada that Lieut. J. B. Blanding of the Veteran Reserve Corps on duty at Grenada in connection with the Freedmen's Bureau was shot three times on Monday night while passing a ten-pin alley in that place. He was not expected to survive. He was a quiet gentlemanly officer and was apparently the best of terms with the citizens...The officer who informed us of this also learned that the Rev. Mr. Bardwell, the Superintendent of Freedmen's Schools at Grenada, was brutally assaulted by an Alderman of that city without any provocation whatever. This law-abiding Alderman is said to have had himself fined $10 and was then congratulated on his chivalric attack. The honor of the deed will be heightened when it is known that Mr. Bardwell is a feeble old man.

=== Investigation and aftermath ===
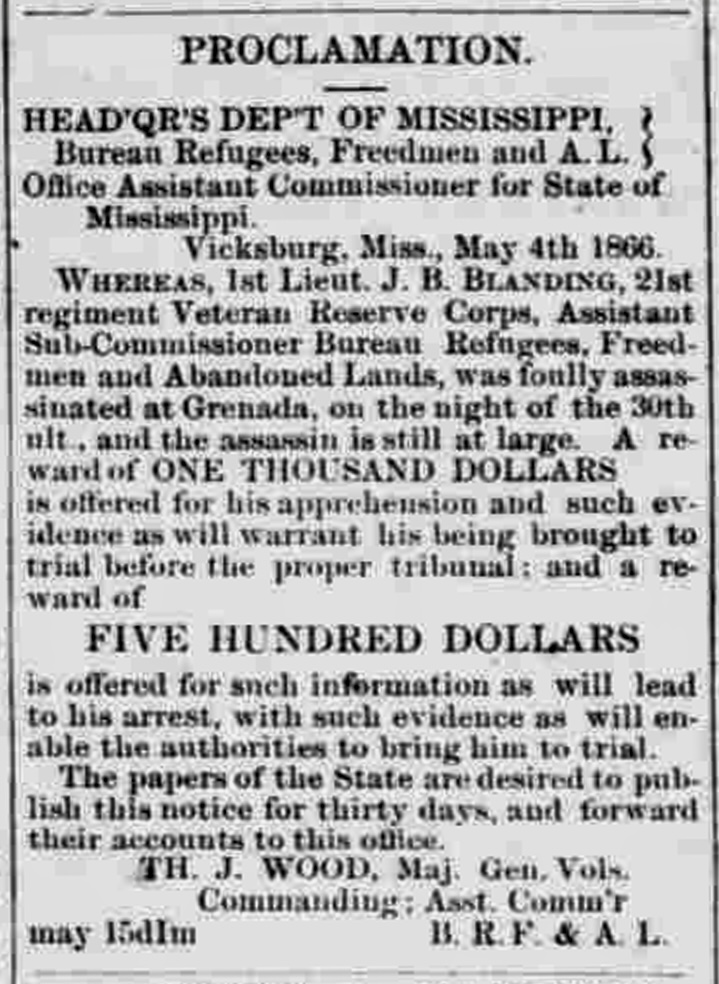
Rewards were offered for information about the killing

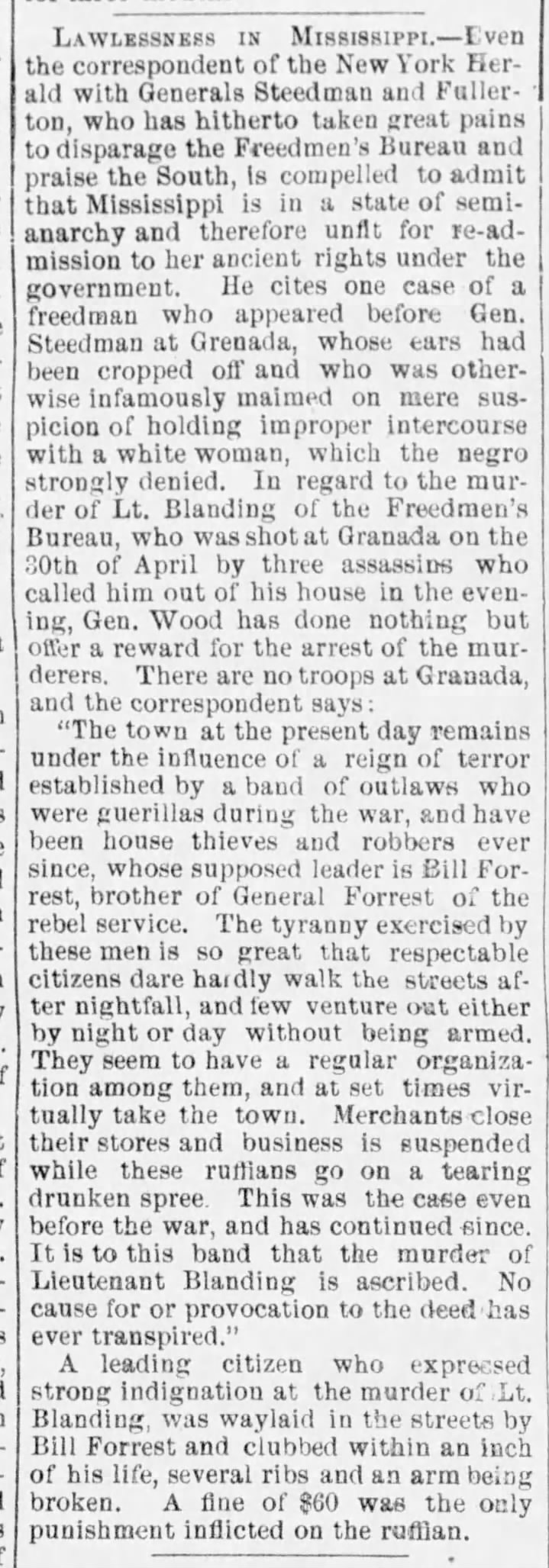
"Lawlessness in Mississippi" (Rutland Weekly Herald, July 12, 1866)

On May 21, 1866, sub-commissioner Silas May wrote from Grenada: "We have been repeatedly warned of our danger and the sound of firearms is heard nightly on the streets, reminding one of being on picket duty." On May 27, 1866, sub-commissioner James M. Shepley wrote, "...beg permission to state that the only evidence 'positive' in the case of the assassination of Lt. Blanding is 'Freedmen' and that there is sufficient to condemn the party, but I am assured that unless they are protected by military authorities, their lives will be taken the moment this fact becomes known." General George Thomas, based in Nashville, wrote the War Department about the situation in Grenada, asking for clarification of "how far I am authorized to proceed with the trial of such a case under the present status of the military with regard to the civil."

The "correspondent of the New York Herald who [was] traveling with Gens. Steedman and Fullerton" reported in July 1866 that the murder of Blanding was generally attributed to a gang of drunken marauders led by Bill Forrest, one of defeated Confederate Lt. Gen. Nathan Bedford Forrest's younger brothers. (Note: The Forrests had been living and selling slaves in Grenada since the 1850s. Bill's brother John N. Forrest owned in home in Grenada and eventually married a local widow.) In addition to the killing of Blanding and the assault on the teacher Rev. Bardwell,

One gentleman, Capt. Adams, who before the war was a wealthy banker, declared openly that the wretches who committed this crime were no more than thugs, and ought to be hanged at once. For this expression of opinion he was waylaid in the streets by Bill Forrest and clubbed within an inch of his life, his ribs and one arm broken. The terrorism exercised by Forrest's gang prevented even this outrage on a prominent and respectable citizen of the town from being adequately punished. A mild fine of something like $60 was all the penalty inflicted upon Forrest."

In 1877, journalist Lafcadio Hearn wrote of William H. Forrest that "where known he was feared...'much more than the Almighty.'"

=== Decline to prosecute ===
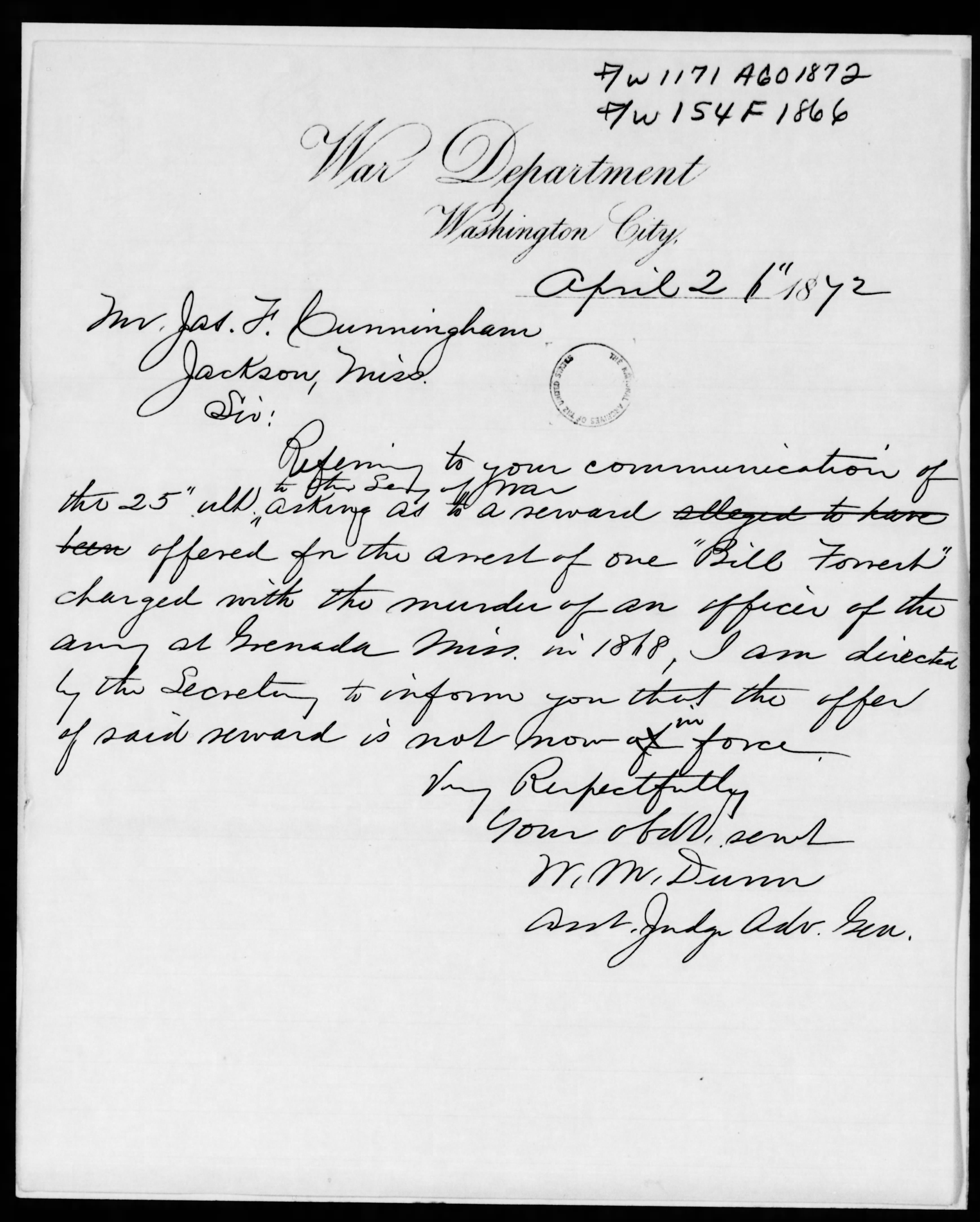
Reward for "Bill Forrest" was no longer in effect as of 1872

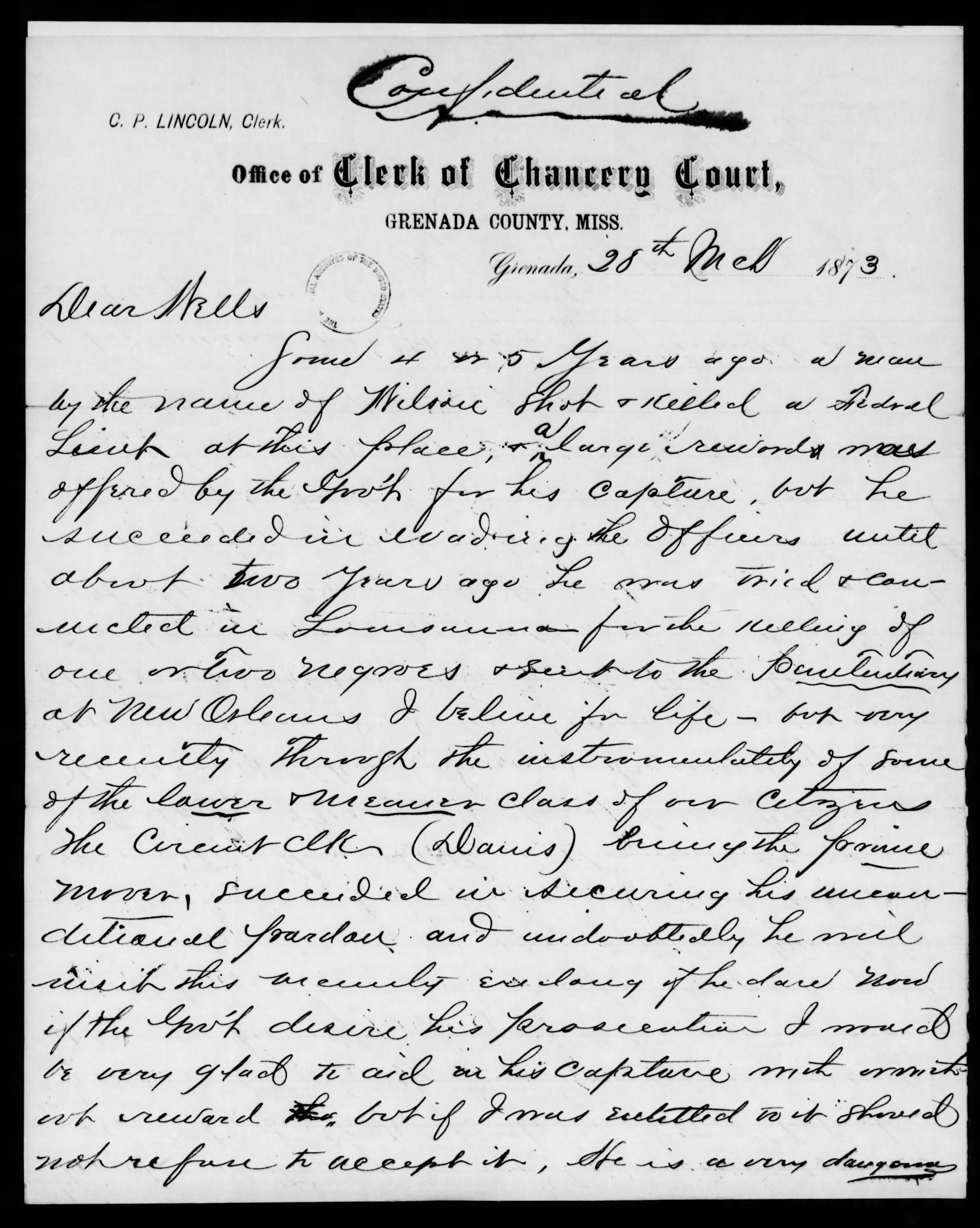
Inquiry of 1873: Wilson, having killed "one or two negroes" had been sent to the Louisiana State Penitentiary for life but was now out again; should he be arrested for Blanding's murder?

The official records of the Freedmen's Bureau indicate that Forrest and "Young Wilson" (who had been convicted of the murders of "one or two negroes" in Louisiana) were major suspects. On March 28, 1873, Grenada County chancery court officer C. P. Lincoln sent a letter to the feds inquiring about possibly arresting Tom Wilson. (Note: Charles P. Lincoln (1843–1911) was a U.S. Army veteran from Michigan who later served as consul to Canton, China, and as an assistant director of the pensions department in Washington, D.C. He was reportedly some kin to Abraham Lincoln. Bertha Lincoln Heustis was his daughter.) According to Lincoln, Wilson had been sentenced to life in Angola Prison after murdering "one or two negroes" but was out again and back in Grenada or environs. Per an affidavit of the sheriff of DeSoto Parish, Thomas H. Wilson had shot and killed William and Mrs. Dorsey on May 25, 1870, near Mansfield, Louisiana. Wilson escaped from jail in New Orleans on February 3, 1871. There was a Thos. Wilson, born in Mississippi, received at Louisiana State Penitentiary from DeSoto Parish on November 3, 1871 to serve out a life sentence for a murder conviction. Wilson was described in the prison register as 23 years old, 5 ft 10 1/2 in (1.79 m), with fair hair and blue eyes. Wilson was pardoned and released on March 26, 1873, after having served about 16 months in prison. U.S. Attorney General George Henry Williams ultimately wrote U.S. Secretary of War William W. Belknap that it was not within the jurisdiction of G. Wiley Wells, the U.S. Attorney for the Northern District of Mississippi, to prosecute Wilson for the murder of Blanding, but rather a matter for the local courts that had "decline[d] to take action on the premises." (Note: For his part, Wells was no enabler of white supremacy. He is remembered for enjoying "strapping on a sidearm and mounting up to help the Marshals arrest Klansmen.")

Decades after the fact, a history of the Reconstruction era in Yalobusha and Grenada Counties reported, "In 1866 Lieutenant Blooding [sic], who was the head of the department at that time, was assassinated by Tom Wilson, a Southern man of desperate character. The reason for this act could not be ascertained by the writer." A biography of Blanding published in 1908 stated that "so great was the power exerted by a band of outlaws then holding a reign of terror that, though the instigators of the murder were believed to be well-known, no witness could be procured to appear against them before the grand jury." Blanding's killers were never brought to justice but according to Oliver Otis Howard, the commissioner of the Bureau of Refugees, Freedmen, and Abandoned Lands, his death was nonetheless a signal event of the immediate post-war period: "The deliberate murder April 30th of that year of a worthy officer, Lieutenant J. B. Blanding, 21st Regiment Veteran Reserve Corps, while walking on the street at Grenada, Miss., and attempts upon the lives of other men who had been faithful and fearless in the discharge of their delicate and dangerous duties, gave rise to increased anxiety everywhere and seemed to necessitate an increase of military force." (Note: Coincidentally, the agent who reported Blanding's murder and that the schoolteachers were in danger died suddenly in Grenada in October 1866. Another agent of the Freedmen's Bureau in Grenada, "Tullidge," allegedly disappeared from town "very suddenly" in January 1868.)

=== Remains ===
Lt. Blanding was buried at the historic North Burial Ground in his home state of Rhode Island. He was apparently breveted captain after his death. His marble grave marker reads, "21 Reg't Vet Res Corp. After serving with distinction in the US Army from commencement to the close of the Civil War, was basely assassinated while in the discharge of his military duties at Grenada, Miss." Blanding was 24 years, nine months old at the time of his murder. He was survived by his wife, Sarah, and a daughter, Pamelia, born December 1864. (Note: For more on the later life of Blanding's family, see "David Wallis Reeves". The history of the state of Rhode Island and Providence Plantations. Vol. IV: Biographical. New York: The American Historical Society Inc. 1920. pp. 249–251.)

== See also ==
- John N. Forrest – American slave jailor, disabled veteran (~1829–1867), brother of Bill Forrest, resident in Grenada from the 1850s
- Mat Luxton – Confederate-American raider (1844–1924), half-brother to the Forrests, resident in Grenada in 1866
- Jotham Horton – Baptist minister murdered by police (1826–1866)
- Rhode Island in the American Civil War
- Bibliography of the Reconstruction era
- Southern Justice – 1867 American artwork by Thomas Nast
- United States Department of Justice § History
