= Timothy S. Huebner =

American legal historian (b. 1966)

Timothy S. Huebner (born 1966) is an American historian who focuses on the history of the American South, the U.S. Constitution, American slavery, the American Civil War, and the Reconstruction Era. Since 2002, he has been director of the Rhodes College Institute of Regional Studies in Tennessee. As of 2023, he chairs the editorial board of the Journal of Supreme Court History.

== Biography ==
Huebner's book Liberty and Union examines the public perception of the U.S. Constitution during the American Civil War; how concerns over entitlements motivated Confederates to abandon the U.S. Constitution in order to enshrine their rights to slavery, how Union soldiers perceived themselves as defending a "uniquely American experiment in constitutional liberty," and how African-American abolitionists set the stage for a "constitutional revolution." Popular media articles have examined John Marshall Harlan's dissent in Plessy v. Ferguson, the history of the judicial-selection laws in Tennessee, and episodes of local history, like the Memphis Riot of 1866 and the racially charged murders of three friends of anti-lynching campaigner Ida B. Wells, that lacked commemoration. In 2016 he wrote a New York Times piece about the history of Supreme Court Justice nominations in election years.

Huebner chairs the history department at Rhodes College in Tennessee and is the author of several non-fiction history books. C-SPAN has broadcast several of his lectures. He has won the James M. Jones Award for Outstanding Faculty Service, the Rhodes College Clarence Day Award for Teaching and in 2005 was chosen as Tennessee Professor of the Year by the Carnegie Foundation for the Advancement of Teaching. He is also an associate provost in the office of academic affairs.

Huebner received a B.A. (Phi Beta Kappa) from the University of Miami and an M.A. and Ph.D. from the University of Florida. His thesis was on "Law and Gospel: Evangelicalism and the jurisprudence of Joseph Henry Lumpkin, 1799–1867." He started teaching at Rhodes around 1995. In September 2012 he gave a presentation on "Lincoln and the Constitution" that is preserved at the Tennessee Digital Commons. In 2014 he lectured at the U.S. Supreme Court, before the Supreme Court Historical Society, on the history of the Taney court and how Roger B. Taney still influenced American civil-rights law in the immediate wake of his death, which occurred in the waning days of the American Civil War. He was awarded the 2024 John T. Hubbell Prize for best article published in the journal Civil War History, for his work on the slave-trading career of Nathan Bedford Forrest.

== Confederate markers ==
Primarily a legal historian with a focus on the Southern judiciary, Huebner has been involved in reexamining Confederate mythology, markers and monuments in the South, such as a historic marker that identified the location of Nathan Bedford Forrest's personal residence while failing to mention that Forrest's slave pen was right next door. A supplementary marker that described Forrest's involvement in the domestic slave trade and his advocacy for reopening the transatlantic slave trade was erected in 2018 and vandalized in 2020. One 2019 letter-to-the-editor in response to the marker called Huebner a "revisionist historian" and advocated instead for marker that honored Nathan Bedford Forrest as "Memphis' first Civil Rights activist" for his 1875 speech to the Independent Order of Pole-Bearers Association.

== Selected works ==
- The Southern Judicial Tradition: State Judges and Sectional Distinctiveness, 1790-1890. Studies in the Legal History of the South. University of Georgia Press. 2011. ISBN 9-780-8203-3236-9.
- The Taney Court: Justice, Rulings, and Legacy. Santa Barbara, Calif.: ABC-CLIO. 2003. ISBN 9781576073681.
- Liberty and Union: The Civil War Era and American Constitutionalism. University Press of Kansas. 2016. ISBN 9780700622696. OCLC 928490441.

=== Contributor ===
- Hall, Kermit L.; Huebner, Timothy S., eds. (2010). Major Problems in American Constitutional History. Major problems in American history. Boston: Wadsworth Cengage Learning. ISBN 9780618543335. OCLC 318869803.
- Huebner, Timothy S. (2020). "Chapter 11: Black Constitutionalism and the Making of the Fourteenth Amendment". In Bond, Beverly Greene; O'Donovan, Susan Eva (eds.). Remembering the Memphis Massacre: An American Story. University of Georgia Press. ISBN 9780820356495.

=== Articles ===
- Huebner, Timothy S. (2015). "The Unjust Judge: Roger B. Taney, the Slave Power, and the Meaning of Emancipation". Journal of Supreme Court History. 40 (249).
- Huebner, Timothy S. (2010). "Roger Taney and the Slavery Issue: Looking Beyond – and Before – Dred Scott". Journal of American History. 97 (1): 39–62. doi:10.2307/jahist/97.1.17. JSTOR 40662816.
- Huebner, Timothy S. (September 1, 2001). "Founding a Slaveholding Republic". Tulsa Law Review. 37 (1): 387.
- Huebner, Timothy S. (2023). "Taking Profits, Making Myths: The Slave Trading Career of Nathan Bedford Forrest". Civil War History. 69: 42–75. doi:10.1353/cwh.2023.0009. S2CID 256599213.
- Huebner, Timothy S. (1991). "Joseph Henry Lumpkin and Evangelical Reform in Georgia: Temperance, Education, and Industrialization, 1830-1860". The Georgia Historical Quarterly. 75 (2): 254–274.
- Huebner, Timothy S. (1994). "The Consolidation of State Judicial Power: Spencer Roane, Virginia Legal Culture, and the Southern Judicial Tradition". The Virginia Magazine of History and Biography. 102 (1): 47–72.
- Huebner, Timothy S. (2015). "Emory Speer and Federal Enforcement of the Rights of African Americans, 1880–1910". American Journal of Legal History. 55 (1): 34–63. doi:10.1093/ajlh/55.1.34.
