= John N. Forrest =

American slave jailor, disabled veteran (~1829–1867)

- Born: c. 1829; Marshall County, Mississippi, U.S.
- Died: October 8, 1867; Memphis, Tennessee, U.S.
- Occupation: Slave jailor
- Relatives: Nathan Bedford Forrest, William H. Forrest, Aaron H. Forrest, Jesse A. Forrest, Jeffrey E. Forrest, Mat Luxton

John N. Forrest was one of the six Forrest brothers who engaged in the interregional slave trade in the United States prior to the American Civil War. A disabled veteran of the Mexican–American War, he worked in family businesses, including as the jailor at Nathan Bedford Forrest's slave pen in downtown Memphis.

== Early life ==
John N. Forrest was born around 1829 in Marshall County, Mississippi, the second-born of William and Mariam (Beck) Forrest's six sons who survived to adulthood. According to his military discharge record, John N. Forrest was 6 ft 0 in (1.83 m) tall at age 19, with light hair, a light complexion, and blue eyes. His occupation was listed as "trader."

== Mexican–American War ==
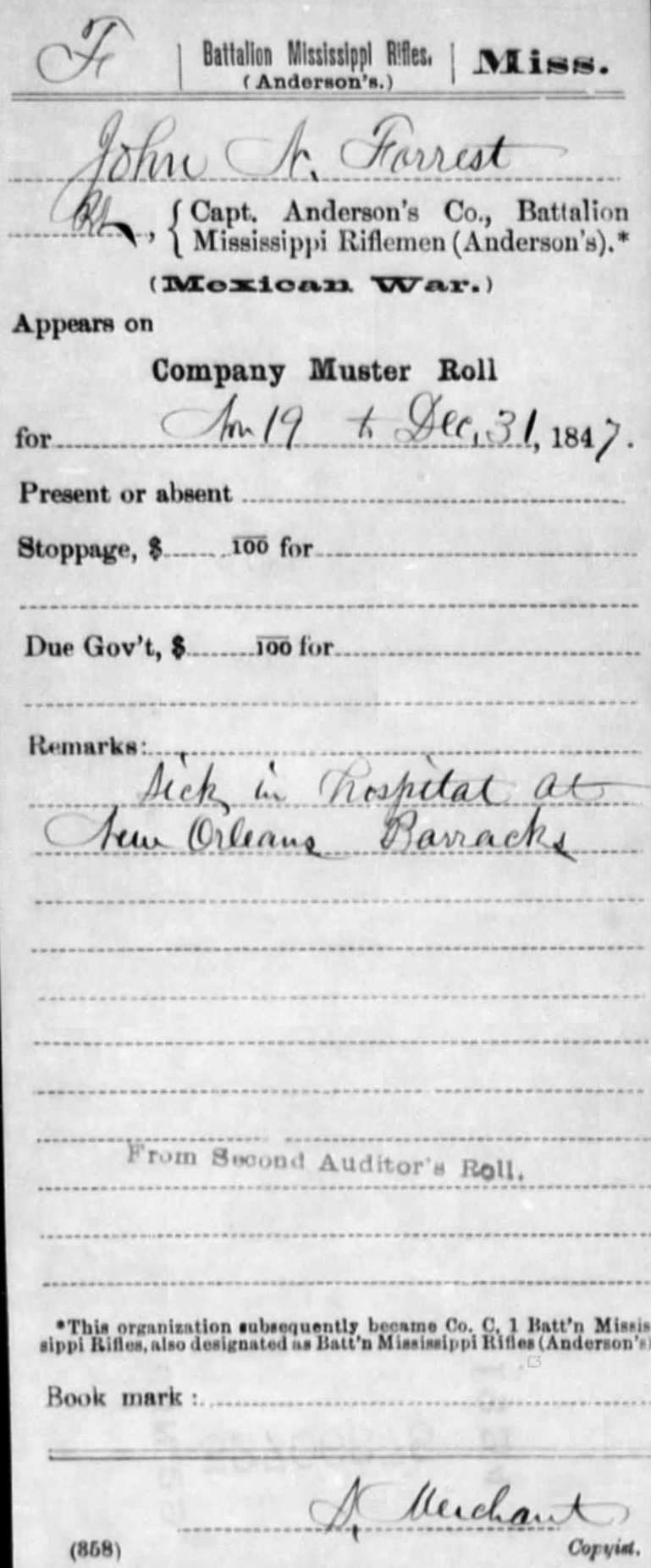

John N. Forrest was 19 years old when he enlisted as a volunteer soldier in what became Company C of Anderson's Rifles (also known as the Mississippi Battalion), on October 30, 1847, at Hernando, the county seat of DeSoto County, Mississippi. J. Patton Anderson recruited and organized Company C, also known as the De Soto Volunteers, but when Anderson was elevated to lieutenant-colonel in February 1848, Hilliard P. Dorsey took over as company captain. Anderson's Battalion makes but a vanishing appearance in the military and cultural history of the conflict. According to the Mississippi Encyclopedia, "The 2nd Mississippi Rifles and Anderson's Battalion of Mississippi Rifles were raised as the result of later federal calls for troops. Neither unit participated in major combat operations...Anderson's Battalion of Mississippi Rifles mustered into service at Vicksburg in September 1847 with 445 men, spent most of its war service in garrison at Tampico, and mustered out of service at Vicksburg in July 1848 with 342 men. It suffered no battle deaths and lost 38 men to other causes."

J. N. Forrest's first muster was dated to November 19, 1847, with the official company muster dated to December 8, 1847, at Vicksburg, Mississippi. Forrest was recorded as being "sick in hospital" at the New Orleans Barracks in the muster record dated from November 19 to December 31, 1847. On January 10, 1848, the New Orleans Delta reported that Company C of the Mississippi Battalion had been camped in a swamp behind the New Orleans Barracks "since the 17th ult." Sickness was rampant in New Orleans, some 70 of the Mississippi volunteers had been hospitalized, five were dead; "the prevailing sickness is pleurisy." (Note: J. Patton Anderson contracted malaria during his Mexican War service, and it caused him continuing health problems for the remainder of his life. Other Mississippi volunteers contracted smallpox. There was a major yellow fever outbreak in New Orleans and other cities of the Mississippi Delta region from July to December 1847. A physician documenting the outbreak volunteered "New Orleans is notoriously a dirty place, but in 1847 it may be said to have luxuriated in filth.") Shortly thereafter three of the battalion's five companies sailed for the coastal city of Tampico, Mexico, apparently via a barque called the R. W. Morris. (Note: On January 22, 1848, the "two remaining companies of the Mississippi Battalion" sailed from New Orleans for Tampico on the ship Tahmaroo.) A letter to the Natchez Daily Courier described the conditions unfavorably, comparing it to a slave ship:

Putting us on board that filthy barque was one of the greatest outrages ever practiced upon soldiers. She was intended for the transportation of produce and horses not men. The men had to sleep between decks, the best way they could, there being no bunks. Not more than three-fourths of the men could lie down at a time, above, below, every where twenty or thirty would sit up all night. You never saw sheep so crowded upon the afterguards of a steamboat...The principle reason for pronouncing the slave trade piracy, and hanging those engaged in it, was that the poor creatures were crowded under decks (as we were.) and oppressed by petty tyrants, dressed up in a little brief authority: and I write this that all who feel any interest in the Mississippi Battalion, may have an opportunity of forming an opinion of an officer whose duty it was (and who had the means at his disposal) of transporting volunteers—American volunteers in the service of their country to their port of destination in comparative comfort and safety, and who willfully refused to do it when informed of the capacity and condition of the vessel, but crowded us like slaves in a slave-ship, in a vessel so filthy as to endanger the health of all on board. ——A MISSISSIPIAN

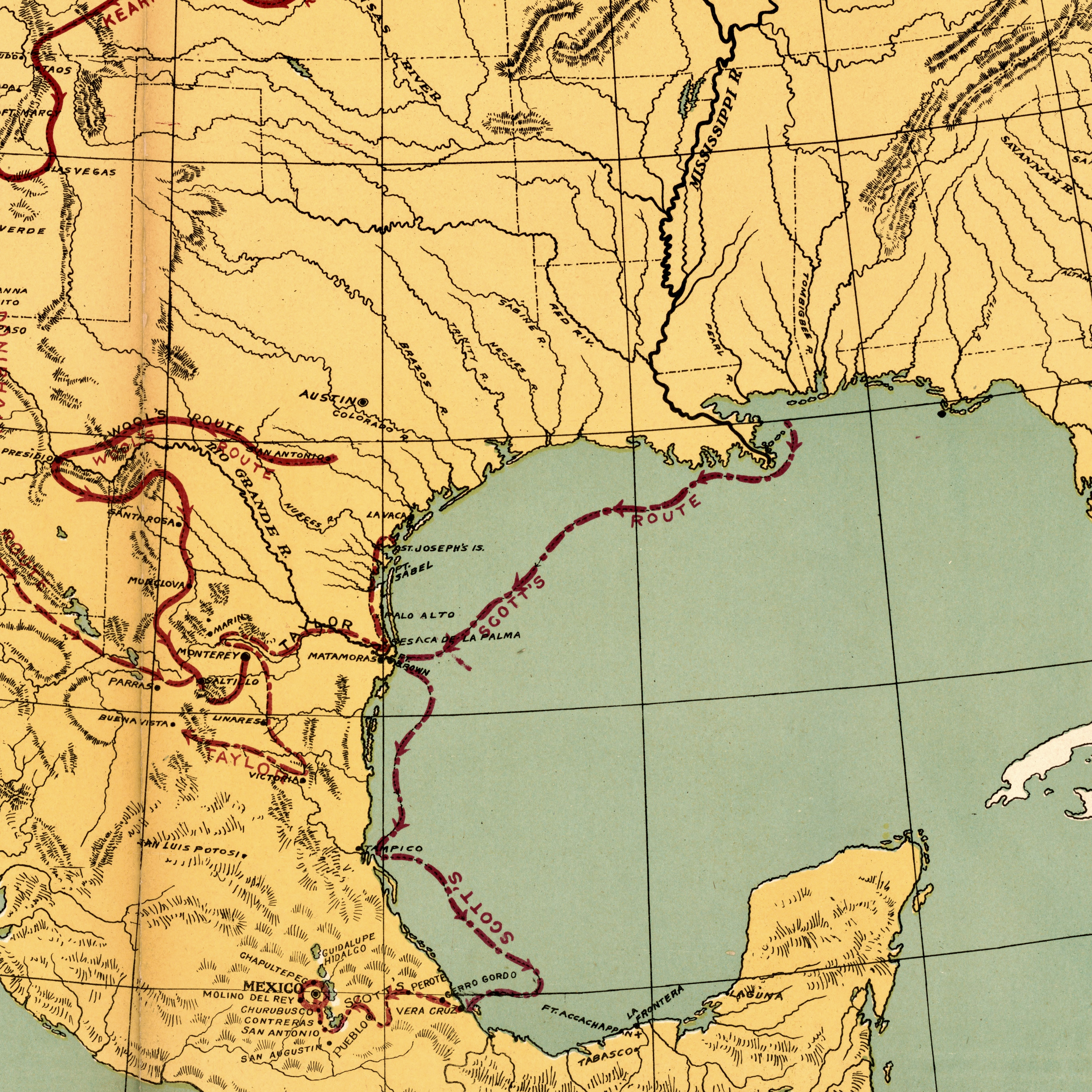
Detail showing the mouth of Mississippi River and location of Tampico, Tamaulipas on the Gulf of Mexico (Map of Mexican–American War campaigns from McConnell's Historical maps of the United States, LOC 2009581130-29)

John N. Forrest was recorded as sick in the military hospital at Tampico in January and February 1848. Forrest appeared on the company muster roll of March and April 1848, and he was last paid on April 24, 1848. On April 24 he was "discharged by surgeon's certificate of disability at Tampico Mex Apr 24 48" per his personnel record. The nature of the disability for which Forrest was discharged is unclear. Although Anderson's Rifles were never in combat, he was later said to have been "half-paralyzed cripple, shot through the lower spine" during the Mexican–American War. Captain Dorsey of Company C returned to Mississippi on June 21, 1848, on the Iona. On June 27, the Vicksburg Daily Whig described Tampico as an unhealthy place as evidenced by the sickly look of the returning soldiers of the Mississippi Battalion. Pvt. Forrest and company were officially mustered out on June 28, 1848, at Vicksburg.

On March 8, 1849, Forrest submitted an affidavit to the commissioner of pensions in Washington, D.C., recapitulating the dates of his military service and swearing that the surgeon's certificate of disability had been lost. On June 16, 1849, the pension department notified J. R. Connelly, of Hernando, De Soto County, Mississippi, that Forrest, claimant number 61430, had been issued 160 acres of land.

John Forrest's older brother, Nathan Bedford Forrest, and commanding officer, J. Patton Anderson—both later Confederate generals—lived in the same household in De Soto County, Mississippi at the time of the 1850 U.S. census.

== Slave trading ==
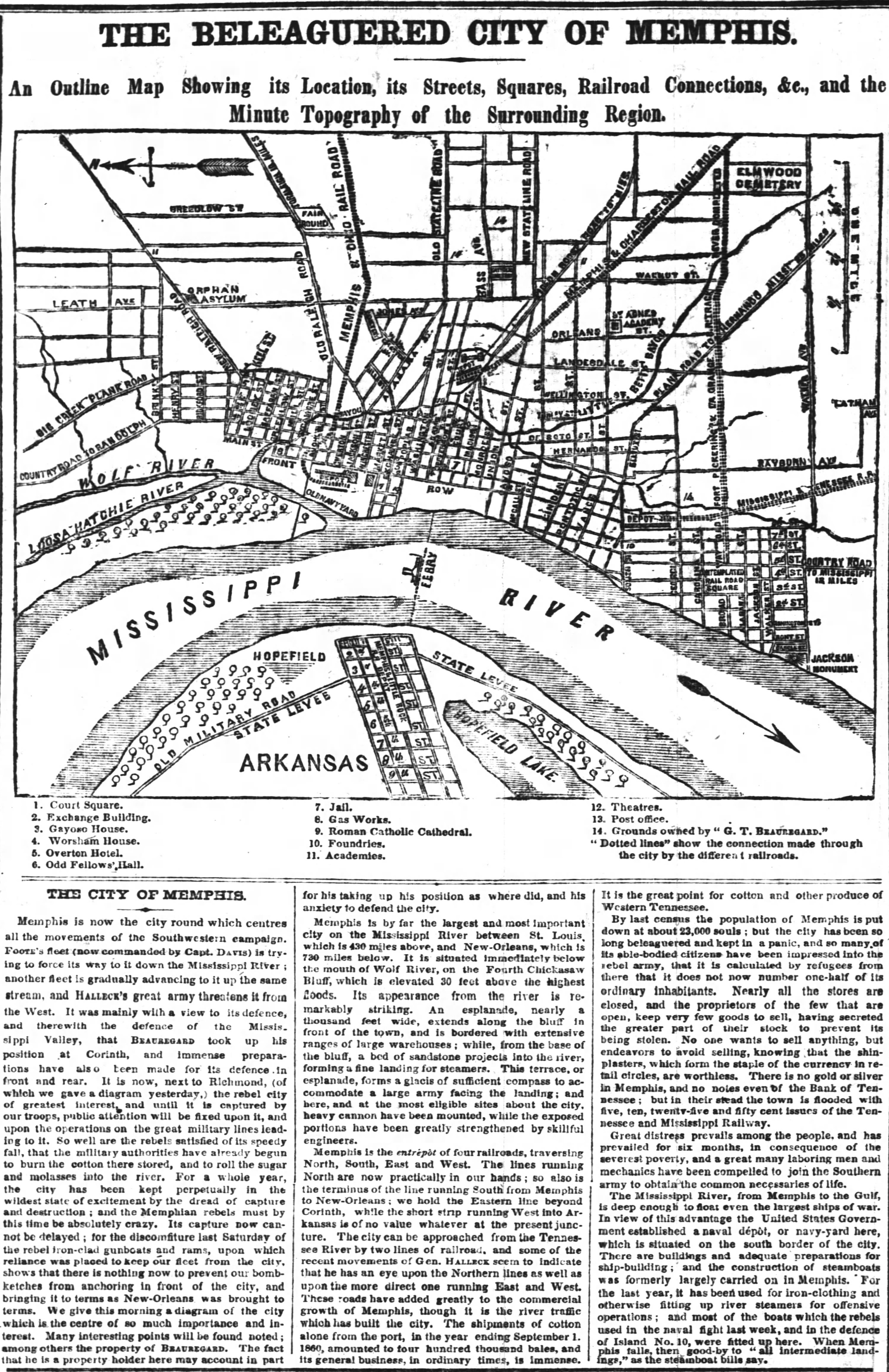
New York Times map of 1862 Memphis including location of Worsham House and the Memphis and Hernando plank road; Forrest's slave jail was on Adams between 2nd and 3rd; the open area marked Row served as a steamboat landing where Memphis slavers would load chained people for shipment to New Orleans or Vicksburg

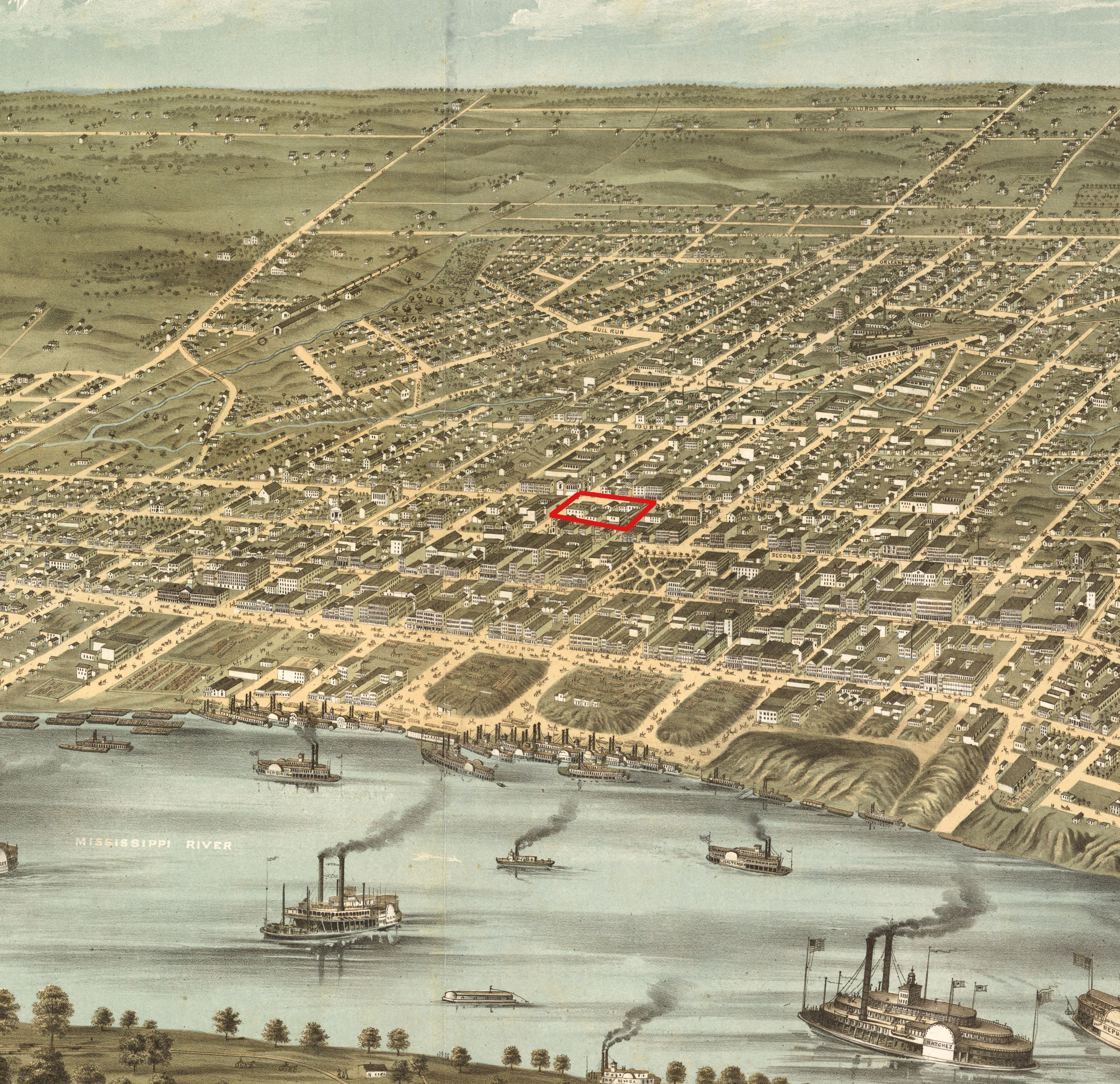
Location of 87 and 89 Adams marked in red on 1870 bird's-eye-view map (streets have since been renumbered; historical marker is in parking lot behind church)

Nathan Bedford Forrest's five younger brothers, including John, were "ideal junior partners" who contributed to a "building a formidable slave-trading operation." According to historian Frederic Bancroft in Slave-Trading in the Old South (1931), "By 1860, Forrest had demonstrated what success an...energetic man could achieve in a few years by buying and selling slaves instead of beasts and real estate. Since the decline of Bolton, Dickens & Co. he had become one of the best known and richest slave-traders in all the South...his five brothers—in sequence John, William, Aaron, Jesse, and Jeffrey—engaged in the same business with him." Bancroft wrote that "According to references during the Bolton trial, John (a cripple from a wound received in the Mexican War) and William were associated with N. B. F. in slave-trading as early as 1857."

In June 1858, T. I. Edmondson of Carroll County, Mississippi wrote a letter inquiring about the medical history of an "unsound slave" (Jim of Wilmington, North Carolina, born 1820s or 1830s, apparently subject to seizures) whom Edmondson had purchased from J. N. Forrest in Memphis in May. At some point, probably in the 1850s, John N. Forrest bought a house on a hill in west Grenada, Mississippi, in what was then Yalobusha County. The Forrests sold slaves in and around Grenada. As of the late 1920s a Grenada resident named Lida Owens held a bill of sale for "Susan, 17 years old of dark copper color, slave for life" sold by N. B. Forrest on July 28, 1859 to Mrs. H. A. Lake for US$1,250 (equivalent to $44,792 in 2025).

An unsigned 1864 newspaper article about Nathan Bedford Forrest and his brothers that was published in Northern newspapers in the aftermath of the Fort Pillow massacre described John Forrest as a "cripple and a gambler, who was a jailor and clerk for Bedford." Per the anonymous correspondent writing from East Tennessee:

The slave pen of old Bedford Forrest, on Adams street, was a perfect horror to all negroes far and near. His mode of punishing refractory slaves was to compel four of his fellow slaves to stand and hold the victim stretched out in the air, and then Bedford and his brother John would stand, one on each side, with long, heavy bull whips, and cut up their victims until the blood trickled to the ground. Women were often stripped naked with a bucket of salt water standing by, in which to dip the instrument of torture, a heavy leather thong, their backs were cut up until the blisters covered the whole surface, the blood of their wounds mingling with the briny mixture to add torment to the infliction. (Note: The use of the brine, a practice called salting, was a well-attested and widespread form of American torture.)

== 1862 shooting incident ==
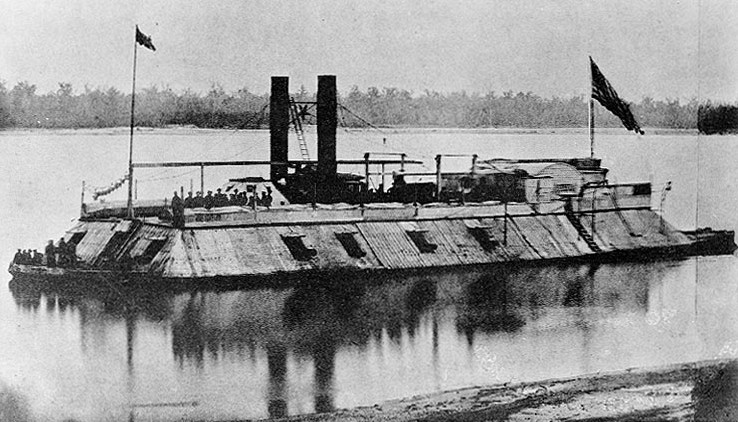
USS Carondelet anchored somewhere in the Mississippi River watershed c. 1862

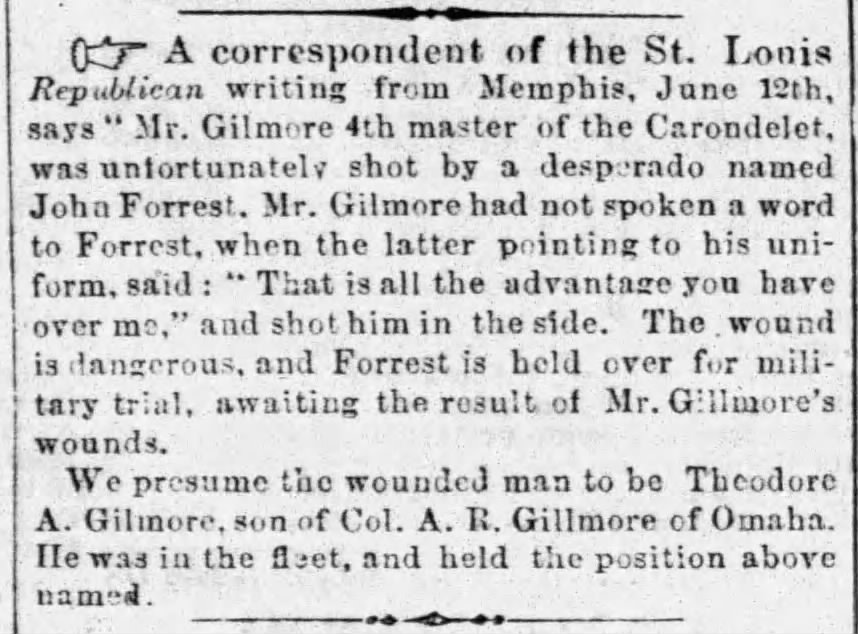
"A correspondent of the St. Louis Republican..." suggests that Forrest shot Gillmore more or less at random (Nebraska City News, June 21, 1862)

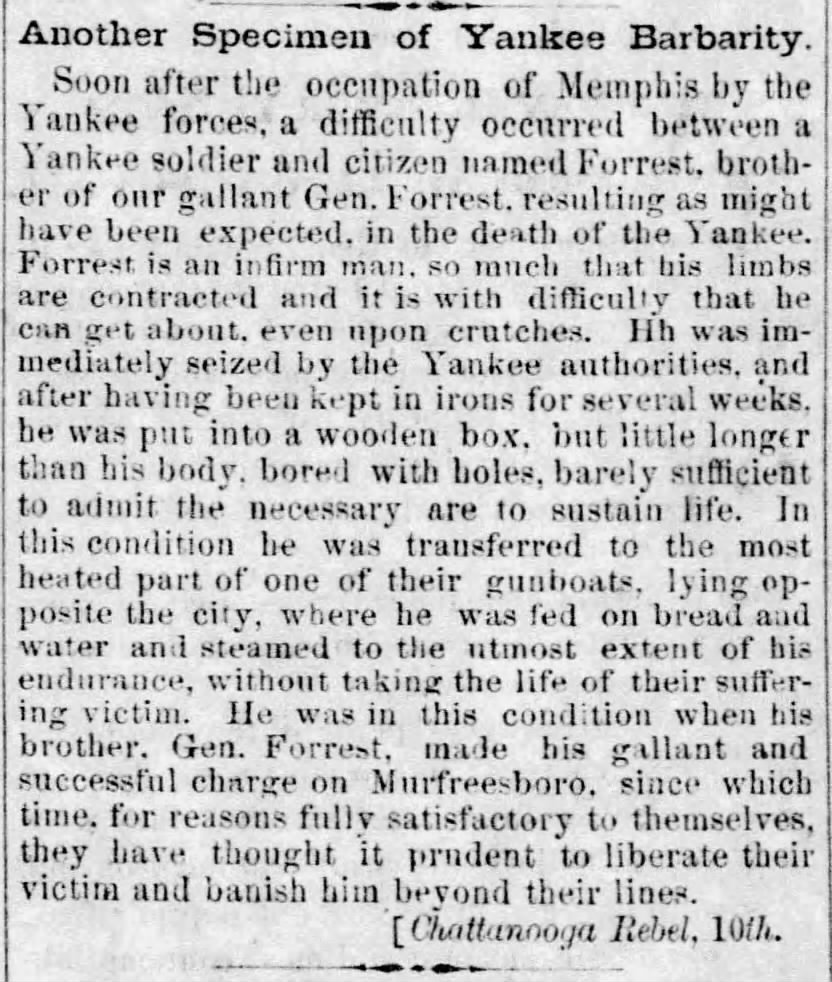
"Another Specimen of Yankee Barbarity" describes Forrest's detention and confinement on the Carondolet (Natchez Weekly Courier, September 3, 1862)

On June 6, 1862, following the First Battle of Memphis, the United States recaptured Memphis from the Confederacy. On June 11, 1862, while inebriated, John Forrest shot a master's mate of the USS Carondelet named Theodore S. Gillmore while both were present at a facility operated by sex worker Puss Pettus on Main Street in Memphis. According to a reporter from St. Louis, the two men not had not otherwise been interacting until Forrest "pointed at his uniform and said 'That is all the advantage you have over me'" and then shot Gillmore in the side. Forrest was arrested and taken aboard the Carondolet after the shooting. Per the Chattanooga Rebel, "After having been kept in irons for several weeks, he was put into a wooden box, but little longer than his body, bored with holes, barely sufficient to admit the necessary are [sic] to sustain life. In this condition he was transferred to the most heated part of one of their gunboats, lying opposite the city, where he was fed on bread and water and steamed to the utmost extent of his endurance." According to the Memphis Daily Union Appeal of July 4, "The United States naval officer who was shot by John Forrest, has expressed, in epistolary form, a strong desire to have him released from confinement, saying, that he forgave him, freely and pitied him much for his ill health and other infirmities." Forrest was eventually transferred to the city jail.

Bedford Forrest biographer John Allan Wyeth, who had served in Gen. Forrest's brigade as a young teenager, described a similar incident under the heading "John Forrest, Wounded in the Mexican War and Partially Paralyzed, Shoots a Federal Major in Memphis in 1864." This account conflicts on significant detail of motive and fight choreography when compared with to story outlined in contemporaneous newspaper articles. In Wyeth's account, Forrest used crutches as a result of being shot "through the lower part of the spinal cord" during the Mexican War. In 1862 he was living at the Worsham House hotel. After a U.S. Army officer insulted his mother during a visit to her plantation outside of Memphis, per Wyeth:

A day or two later, as John Forrest was sitting in front of the hotel, this officer passed near him, when he stopped him, called his attention to his conduct in the presence of his mother, and told him that if ever he repeated the offence he would break his crutch over his head. The Federal officer resented this remark, and began to abuse not only John Forrest but all the family in severe terms. At this the cripple raised himself from his chair, and, leaning upon one crutch, tried to strike the officer with the other. His antagonist seized the crutch as it was raised in the air, and kicked the remaining one from underneath the paralyzed man, who immediately fell to the sidewalk. Having full use of his arms, he drew a derringer from his pocket and shot the officer, who for weeks lay at the point of death, but finally recovered.

According to Wyeth, Colonel Forrest later successfully demanded John Forrest's release and the younger brother was not convicted of any crime. An account collected in the 1920s from local informants in Grenada, Mississippi also seemingly describes Forrest's captivity on the Carondelet: "The Yankees captured John Forrest, Nathan Bedford Forrest's brother, and placed him beside a boiler on a gunboat and burned him because he was N. B. Forrest's brother. This made N. B. Forrest very bitter. John Forrest had to use crutches after that."

A history of the Carondelet lists Gillmore as a crewman and describes his participation in the Battle of Island Number Ten but makes no mention of John N. Forrest. (Note: Master's Mate Gillmore survived his injuries, and the war. He went on to become an accountant in Syracuse, New York. The U.S. Congress approved an increase to his widow's pension in 1926.) According to a history of the sex commerce of 19th-century Memphis, on June 14, 1862, three days after the shooting, "the police shuttered a brothel kept by Puss Pettus...Pettus defiantly reopened her establishment, but the provost marshal closed it permanently a week later." (Note: Within two weeks after the U.S. had recaptured the city, amidst what had apparently been a bacchanal for soldiers and a massive spike in revenue for sex workers, "Provost Marshal John H. Gould found it necessary to issue a special order stating, 'Lewd women are prohibited from conversing with soldiers while on duty; nor will they be allowed to walk the streets after sunset. Anyone of the class indicated who shall violate this order will be conveyed across the river and will not be allowed to return within the limits of the city.' The same day that newspapers published the order, military police escorted the infamous Puss Pettus across the river." Based on her son's marriage record of 1888, Puss Pettus may have been this woman's legal name.)

== Marriage, death, burial, estate ==
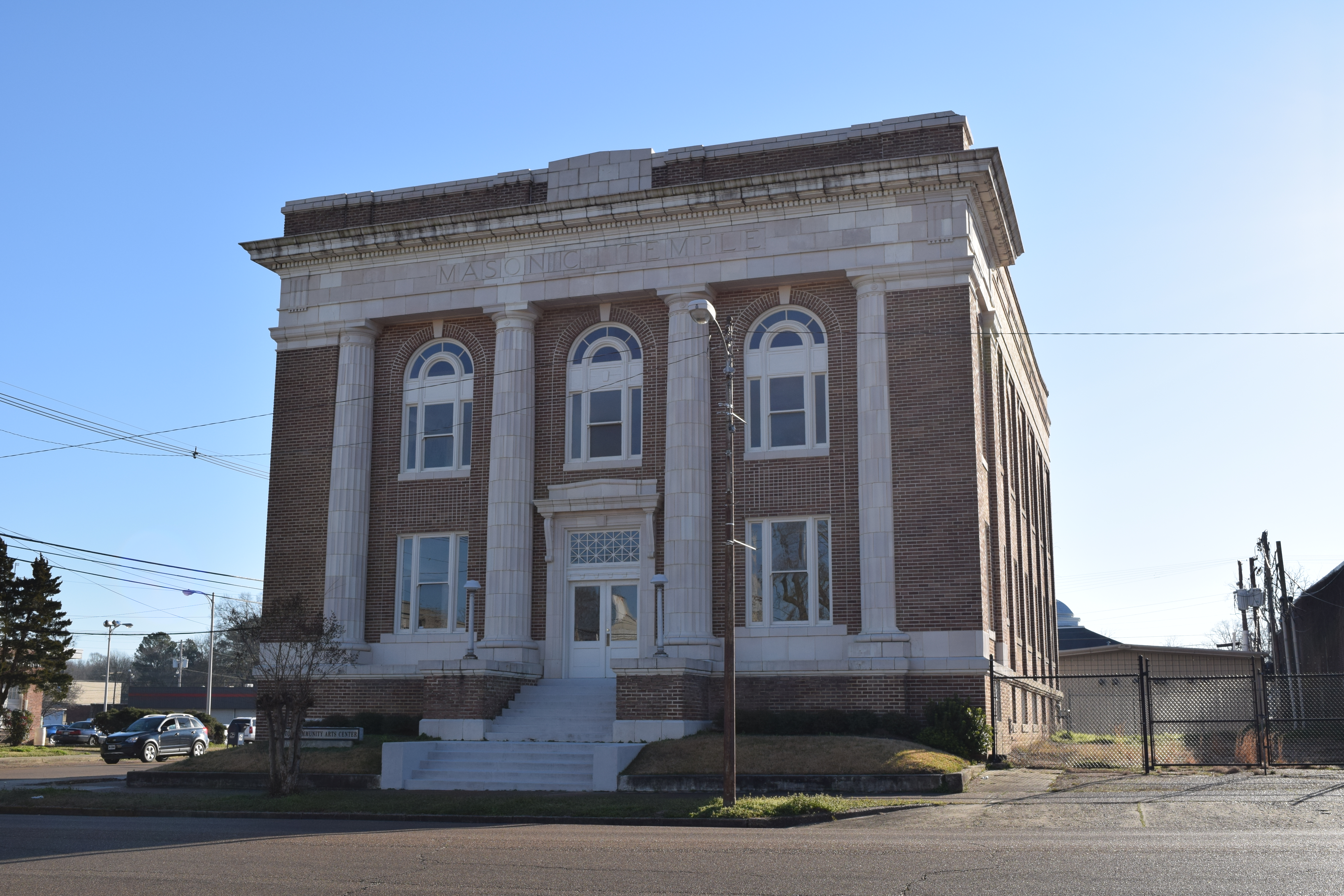
John N. Forrest lived for a time "back of the Masonic Temple" in Grenada, Mississippi; the building pictured is a later Masonic Temple structure, constructed 1925

Forrest married Hariette Price in Yalobusha County, Mississippi on July 28, 1864. According to a history of Grenada in the 19th century, John Forrest "lived for a while back of the Masonic Temple. He married Mrs. Price, who was Harriet Montjoy. John Forrest used to get drunk a great deal and when he would get drunk his favorite stunt was to play William Tell with his wife. He would put an apple on her head and get out his pistol to shoot. Harriet would always send for her mother; Mrs. Gomillion was the only one who could manage him. Mrs. Gomillion would always get her out of the room by sending her for something, and John Forrest was afraid to cross her." John Forrest died of a stomach disorder in Shelby County, Tennessee in 1867 at the age 39. John N. Forrest's funeral service was held at the Gayoso Hotel. Days after John Forrest's death, his widow began advertising for work as a mantuamaker, meaning a seamstress or dressmaker. Following his death, a piece of property in Grenada, Mississippi that had been titled to John Forrest was sold off in order to repay a debt of the estate.

Forrest was buried in Elmwood Cemetery in Memphis. In 1966 a grand-niece named Cecil Bradley applied for a veterans' headstone to be placed at his gravesite.

== See also ==
- History of slavery in Tennessee
- Slave markets and slave jails in the United States
- List of United States military and volunteer units in the Mexican–American War § Mississippi
- Tennessee in the American Civil War
- Mat Luxton
