= Jotham Horton =

Baptist minister murdered by police (1826–1866)

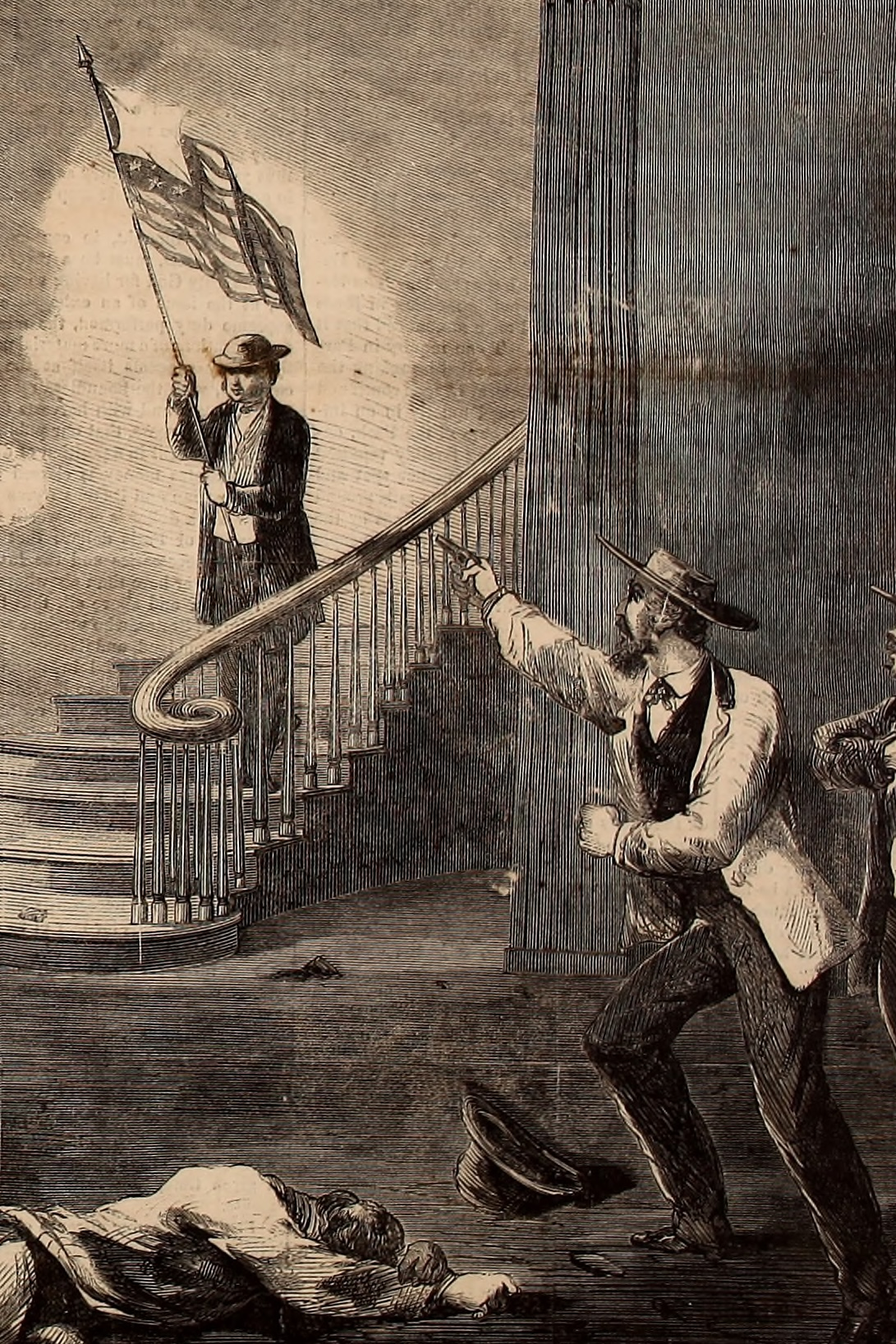
Detail of Theodore R. Davis image from Harper's Weekly cover: "Murder of the Rev. Mr. Horton in the vestibule of the Mechanics Institute"

Rev. Mr. Jotham Warren Horton (1826 – August 5, 1866) was a clergyman originally from New England and a supporter of black suffrage in Louisiana after the American Civil War who was assassinated by the New Orleans Police Department under New Orleans mayor John Monroe as part of the New Orleans massacre of 1866.

== Biography ==
The son of a Rev. Jotham Horton, Methodist of Nantucket and Bromfield, Horton was a graduate of Newton Theological Seminary. He was married in Acton, Massachusetts, on June 4, 1848, to Mary Rowell. Horton was the pastor of the Coliseum Baptist Church of New Orleans and had been asked to open the planned constitutional convention with a prayer.

According to a newspaper account published in November 1866, "Reverend Horton received five balls in his body and fell. Those balls were fired by policemen. Not satisfied with their work, they seized him battered his head with their billy clubs, stabbed him, then kicked and dragged him over the pavements to the first Police station. The mob followed behind cursing and trampling him with their shoes. Then thrusted him into a cell where he was left mangled and senseless." He was said to have been waving a white flag of truce when he was first shot. He died of his injuries on August 5. Before he died he asked his wife to make sure someone else covered a sermon he was expected to make at another church. His funeral was Wednesday, August 29 at Tremont Temple in Boston. He was buried at Mount Auburn.

Horton's Southern Unionist brother Gustavus Horton was military mayor of Mobile, Alabama in 1867. Two of Jotham Horton's nephews had served in the Confederate Army.

== See also ==
- J. B. Blanding
