= Jesse A. Forrest =

Confederate colonel, businessman (1834–1889)

- Jesse Forrest, 1860 census of Memphis, Tennessee
- Born: April 9, 1834
- Died: December 15, 1889 (aged 55)
- Relatives: Nathan Bedford Forrest (brother); John N. Forrest (brother); William H. Forrest (brother); Aaron H. Forrest (brother); Jeffrey E. Forrest (brother); Mat Luxton (half-brother)

Jesse Anderson Forrest (April 9, 1834 – December 15, 1889) was an American slave trader, Confederate cavalry colonel, livery stable owner, and cotton plantation owner of Tennessee and Arkansas, United States.

== Biography ==
Before the war, the Forrest brothers were engaged in the slave trade at Memphis, Tennessee, and up and down the Mississippi River. Nathan Bedford Forrest's five younger brothers were "ideal partners" for building an interstate trading network, and "over the course of a few years, all the Forrest brothers—including the two youngest, Jesse and Jeffrey—participated in building a formidable slave-trading operation." At the time of the 1860 U.S. census, "J. E. Forrest" lived in the seventh ward of Memphis with his wife Sarah, their four young children, and a man, Nicholas Innes, who listed his occupation as "pilot." Forrest listed his occupation as "negro trader," and he owned $3,000 in real property and $6,000 in personal property (which would have included enslaved people of whom he had legal ownership).

Jesse Forrest fought alongside his brother Lt. Gen. Nathan Bedford Forrest in the American Civil War, as well as under command of other Confederates such as Gideon J. Pillow. He enlisted as a private in the Tennessee Mounted Rifles and was a lieutenant colonel by 1862. News reports during and after the war describe him as a colonel; the Confederate Officers' Card Index lists his highest rank as lieutenant colonel. He was listed as colonel commanding the 21st Tennessee Cavalry Regiment when he was injured in a fight near Decatur in 1864. After the war he worked as an "extensive levee and railroad contractor, farmer, and dealer in livestock." A father of six, in later life he owned three large plantations at Walnut Bend, Arkansas. He died of "malarial hemaeturia" in Memphis, Tennessee in 1889.
