= Mat Luxton =

Confederate-American raider (1844–1924)

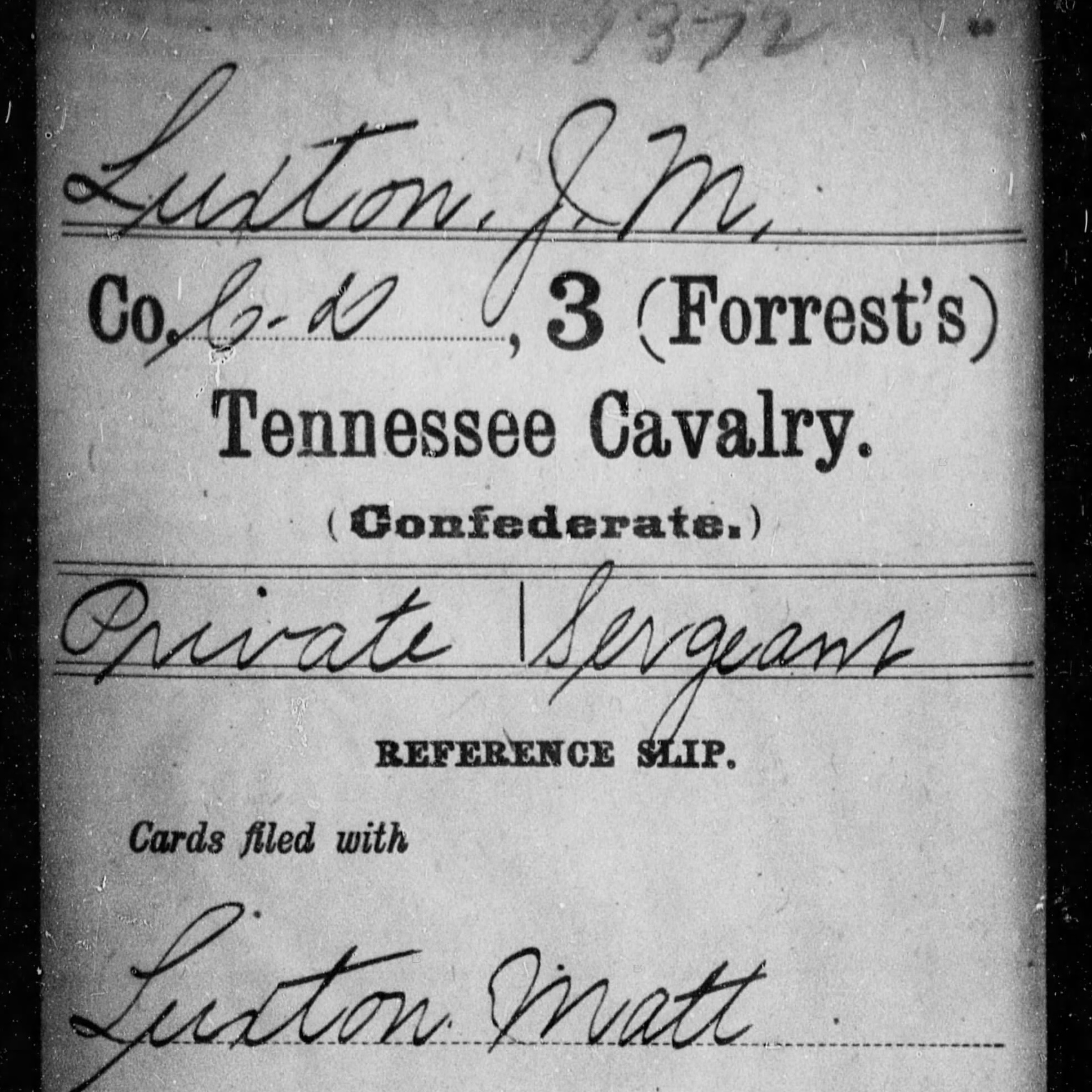
- Born: February 27, 1844; Mississippi, U.S.
- Died: January 22, 1924 (aged 79); Uvalde, Texas, U.S.

Mat Luxton (February 27, 1844 – January 22, 1924), formally James Madison Luxton, was a Confederate-aligned guerrilla and Texas deputy sheriff in the 19th-century United States.

== American Civil War ==
J. M. Luxton, age 18 at enlistment, was a younger half-brother of Nathan Bedford Forrest by their mother's second marriage. Luxton was described as "notorious" in at least two histories. The label guerrilla may be disputed; U.S. Army general Don Buell later told a military commission investigating his strategic decisions in 1862, "I object to this term 'guerrillas' as applied to these troops. They are as much troops as any in the rebel service. I think there is a difference between the cavalry of Morgan, Forrest, and Starnes, and what we understand by 'guerrillas.' I know of no reason for giving them a character which does not belong to them, for they are not 'guerrillas' in the proper sense of that term." Further to the point, another historian writes, "Given the fact that, North and South, the vast majority of the combatants were civilians in uniform, such a point may seem a distinction without a difference. As the noted military historian J. F. C. Fuller, observed, 'The Federal soldier was semi-regular and Confederate semi-guerrilla.'" Whether Mat Luxton was a cavalry raider or a guerrilla—defined as "small bands of unorganized bushwhackers"—was seemingly decided in the affirmative by a court of 1865, but may have been a fluid situation during the course of the war.

As of April 1865 Luxton was reportedly leading a band of "about 20." In May 1865, Gen. Washburn ordered that he be "disposed of by drumhead court-martial" if he was captured.

A typically "colorful" Forrest story was reported in July 1865, after the Confederate surrender: "A few days before Gen. Forrest left Grenada a messenger brought him a note from Mat Luxton, asking some favor, Forrest declined to accede to it, when the messenger reproached him for neglect, Forrest caught the messenger by the collar, dragged him to a tree, pulled a limb off, and with it thrashed the messenger finely. The incident is noteworthy as indicating the state of feeling existing between Forrest and Luxton. It is understood that Forrest strongly reprobated Luxton's course in West Tennessee, and sent several times to have him and his men arrested. He thinks mercy in this case would not be Justice." But wait there's more: "Mat. Luxton was paroled at Grenada with Forrest's command. Afterward he went up the railroad toward Panola. Luxton got into a dispute with a Jew, and drew a knife to stab him, when Forrest drew a pistol on Luxton and threatened to shoot him, and thus saved the Jew's life. When the latter went to Grenada he reported that Mat. Luxton was in town, and a guard was sent to arrest him. Col. Funk took his parole from him, and sent him to Memphis in irons, to be tried tor his numerous acts while operating as a guerrilla —Luxton reached Memphis on the steamer Pocahontas, in heavy irons, with ball and chain, under heavy guard, and is now in Irving Block."

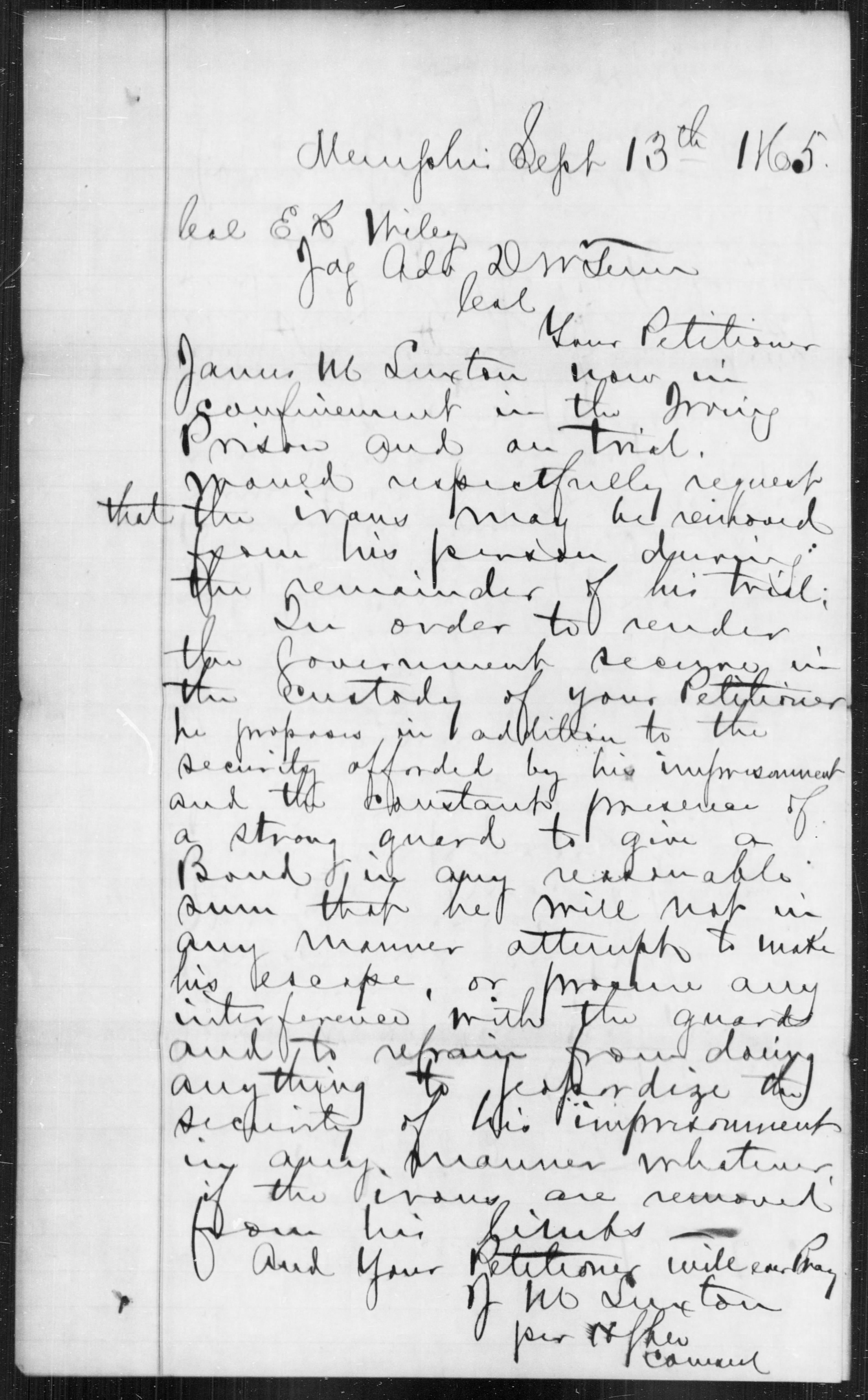
Letter of September 13, 1865 requesting removal of irons during trial, promises not to escape (Union Provost-Marshals' File of Paper Relating to Individual Civilians, 1861–1865, NAID 2133278 via Fold3)

According to the regimental history of the 7th Indiana Cavalry, "On the 7th of June, 1865, Lieutenant Blackford was detailed to serve on a military commission at Memphis, Tennessee, of which Colonel George W. McKeaig was president. Before that commission, Mat Luxton, a notorious guerrilla, and a half-brother of the rebel General N. B. Forrest, was brought for trial for his crimes. Owing to the difficulty the Government had in getting witnesses, the trial dragged along for eighty days...His friends offered thousands of dollars for his release. His mother, and Col. Forrest, his half brother, attended his trial almost daily. He was ably defended by Captain Henry Lee, a Union officer." On September 13, 1865, a letter was sent on his behalf, requesting removal of irons during trial, along with solemn promises that Luxton would not attempt to escape.

Luxton was convicted of murder and "being a guerrilla" and was sentenced to death. Luxton escaped from Irving Block prison in December 1865. The guards may have been bribed.

Recollections of 19th-century Grenada, Mississippi that were recorded by a university master's student in the 1920s mention Luxton:

John Forrest moved to the old Hundley house which was located back of the residence of Mrs. Ida Campbell. One night they had a dance at their home. Mrs. Belle Rose, Mrs. Ella Anderson, and her brother were present. Max Luxton, N. B. Forrest's step-brother came. He was afraid to come in the light because there was a price on his head. The Federals were after him because it was known he was a scout and had killed some Yankees. He stayed in the back room where there wasn't any light, with his bridle over his arm. As the girls would pass dancing, he would step in and turn them. The report got out that the Yankees were going to surround the house, so the dance broke up.

On January 19–20, 1866, there were reportedly two shootings in Grenada that were said to be associated with the Luxton trial: "On Friday last a man named Greene, while standing in his store door at Grenado, Miss., was shot by some person, unknown, and almost immediately killed. The night following, another man by the name of Tell, was called out of his house and shot dead by an assassin, who escaped. It is said that Tell was the party who gave information which led to the arrest of Mat Luxton several months ago, and that this was the cause of his death at the hands of some of Luxton's friends and former followers. Greene, it is said, was killed for expressing sympathy for Tell, and denouncing his murderers."

In February 1866, "two Germans" who had testified at Mat Luxton's trial were reportedly murdered at Grenada. (Note: For a one-dimensional yet telling account of the political and social conditions in Yalobusha County at this time, see Brown, Julia C. (1912). "Reconstruction in Yalobusha and Grenada Counties". Publications of the Mississippi Historical Society. XII. University of Mississippi: 282.)

== Wilcox ==
A separate guerrilla, real name Wilcox, operated as "J.M. Luxton" for a time. Wilcox was captured, tried, and hanged in April 1865.

== Later life ==
After the war Mat Luxton reportedly "had a store at Forrest Hill, on the Memphis and Charleston railroad, in 1866–67." Circa 1867 he worked as a deputy sheriff in Grimes County, Texas. He married in Texas in 1868. In 1920 at age 74, he was living with his daughter in Nolan County, Texas. Luxton died in Uvalde, Texas in 1924 and is buried in Reagan Wells Cemetery there under a veterans' headstone denoting his American Civil War service as a sergeant in the 3rd Tennessee Cavalry.

== See also ==
- William H. Forrest
- Champ Ferguson
- De Witt Clinton Fort
- Bibliography of Nathan Bedford Forrest
- USS Pocahontas (1852)
