= William H. Forrest =

American slave trader, guerrilla, and desperado (~1830–1875)

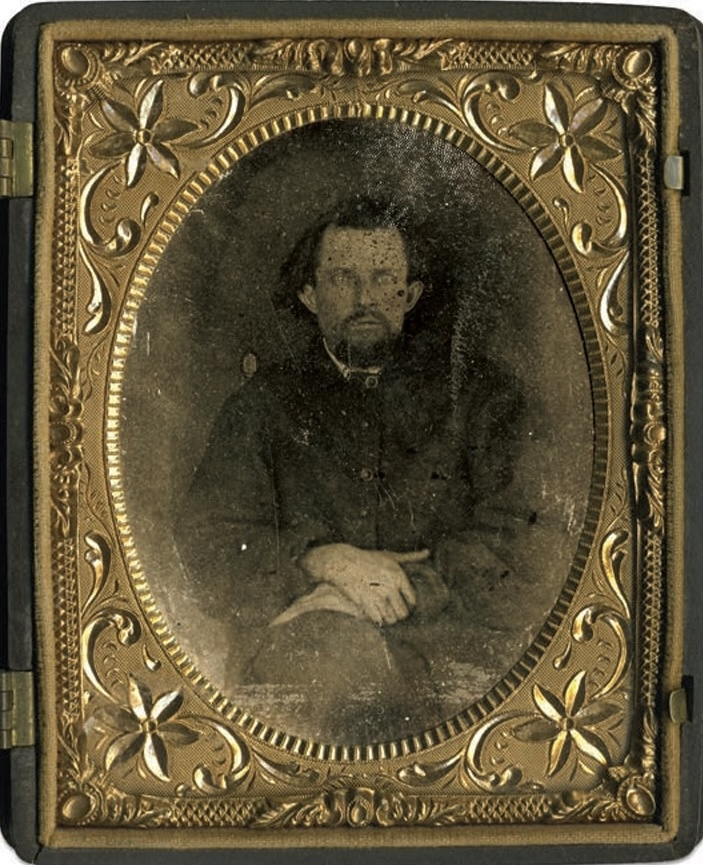
- Quarter-plate tintype, Matt Hagans Collection (Military Images, Spring 2018)
- Born: c. 1831; Tennessee, U.S.
- Died: March 14, 1875; Memphis, Tennessee, U.S.

William Hezekiah Forrest (c. 1831 – March 14, 1875), called Bill Forrest, was one of the six Forrest brothers who engaged in the interregional slave trade in the United States prior to the American Civil War. During the war he served under his brother Nathan Bedford Forrest's command as leader of a group of Confederate-aligned raiders called the Forty Thieves. After the war Forrest was involved in several shooting incidents and was implicated in the assassination of a Freedmen's Bureau sub-commissioner in 1866. Multiple accounts describe Forrest as an unstable and lethal "desperado." Forrest died in 1875 of either "dissipation" (alcohol dependence) or "stomach congestion."

== Early life ==
Bill Forrest was the fourth-born son of William and Miriam (Beck) Forrest, and he grew up in rural areas of Tennessee and northern Mississippi. The Forrest children were generally afforded little education as the family was preoccupied with subsistence farming and then animal trading. Later, Nathan Bedford Forrest's five younger brothers were "ideal junior partners" who contributed to a "building a formidable slave-trading operation." William H. Forrest began working for Bedford around 1857. Bill Forrest was described in a highly critical anti-Forrest article published in the aftermath of the Battle of Fort Pillow as "an extensive negro trader at Vicksburg." According to historian Jack Hurst, Bill Forrest frequented St. Louis where he collected "sizable" gangs of Missouri slaves for resale.

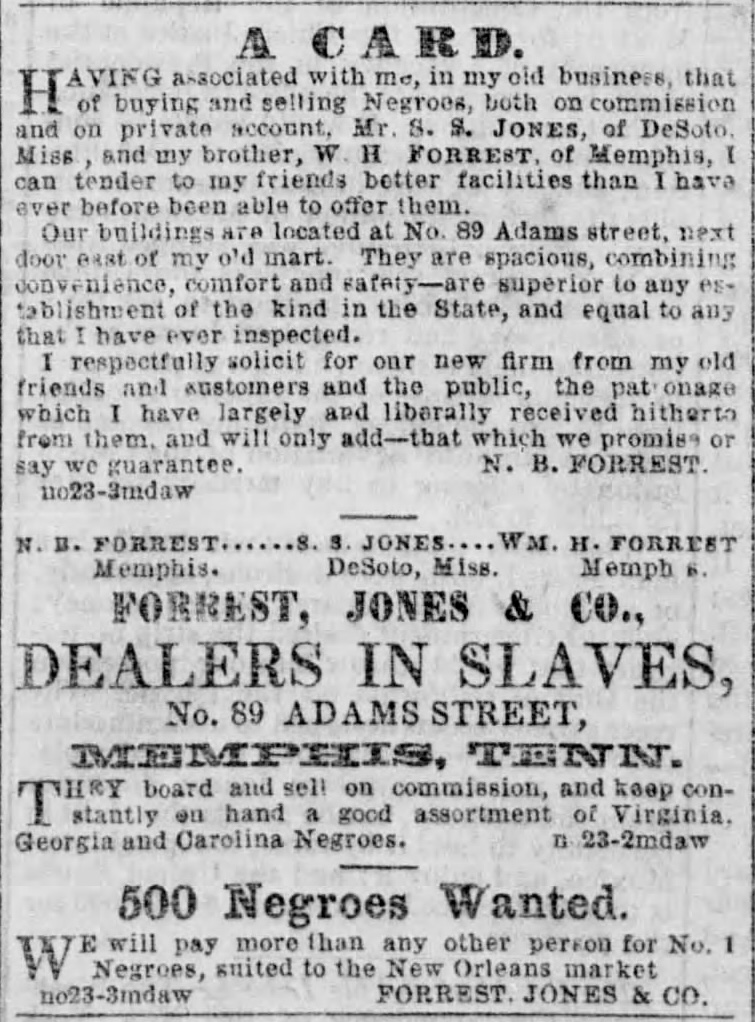
1859 advertisement in a Des Arc, Arkansas newspaper for the slave-trading firm in which William H. Forrest was a partner

In autumn 1853, when he was about 23 years old, Bill Forrest allegedly shot and killed James Holt of Vine Grove, Texas. Holt had founded that community and was its first postmaster. Forrest was arrested 18 years later in Gonzalez, Texas. At the 1871 trial he was acquitted of murder by a jury of 11 whites "and one negro."

== American Civil War ==
According to one database of Confederate military leadership, Forrest served as an officer in several Confederate cavalry units. He started out as a first lieutenant in the 11th Tennessee Cavalry Regiment, and then became a captain and was later promoted to major in a unit that ended the war as the 3rd Tennessee Cavalry Regiment. However, at least one military historian argues that Forrest primarily operated outside the mainline Confederate States Army command structure:

Perhaps no part of [N.B.] Forrest's organization is quite so characteristic of him as his use of scouts. Information is of tremendous importance in war. Forrest intuitively appreciated this from the very beginning; in his own unique way he organized the gathering of information extremely well. Trained regular soldiers are notoriously poor at mingling with civilians to gain information. Even volunteer soldiers in uniform are somewhat at a disadvantage. Forrest's Scouts, who were more or less continuously commanded throughout various organizations by his brother, Captain Bill Forrest, were never on the Confederate payroll. They came together in times of stress and fought bravely, mounted or on foot; however, they usually operated semi-independently. They were not spies; they were always armed and operated under direct control against the enemy. There was an informality about the Southern uniform, however, which allowed the scouts to appear to be civilians when it was desirable. Forrest was undoubtedly the best informed commander on either side.

— Jac Weller, "The Logistics of Nathan Bedford Forrest" (1953)

For at least part of the American Civil War, Forrest led a group colloquially known as the Forty Thieves. The nature of this group is described in Joel Chandler Harris's 1904 A Little Union Scout, wherein a character explains, "I was billeted with Captain Bill Forrest's company of Independents, sometimes known as the Forty Thieves, owing to their ability as foragers." An 1899 review of a Forrest biography described them similarly: "They drew no pay except from the enemy, and lived by foraging on the enemy when they could, and on friends when no enemy was at hand. Such troops, well directed, were particularly uncomfortable customers to those whom they wished to harass and disquiet."

In April 1863, Bill Forrest was wounded and captured at the Battle of Day's Gap—"after being unhorsed by a bullet that smashed one of his thigh bones." Union lieutenant colonel and later governor of Louisiana Henry C. Warmoth wrote almost 70 years later "My regiment fought Bill Forrest, brother of Nathan Bedford Forrest, at Decatur, Alabama, and one of my men shot him through the hips."

On May 21, 1864, Forrest and his men routed a scouting party of the 4th Missouri Cavalry Regiment (Union) (Col. George E. Waring Jr.) in a skirmish near Mount Pleasant, Mississippi.

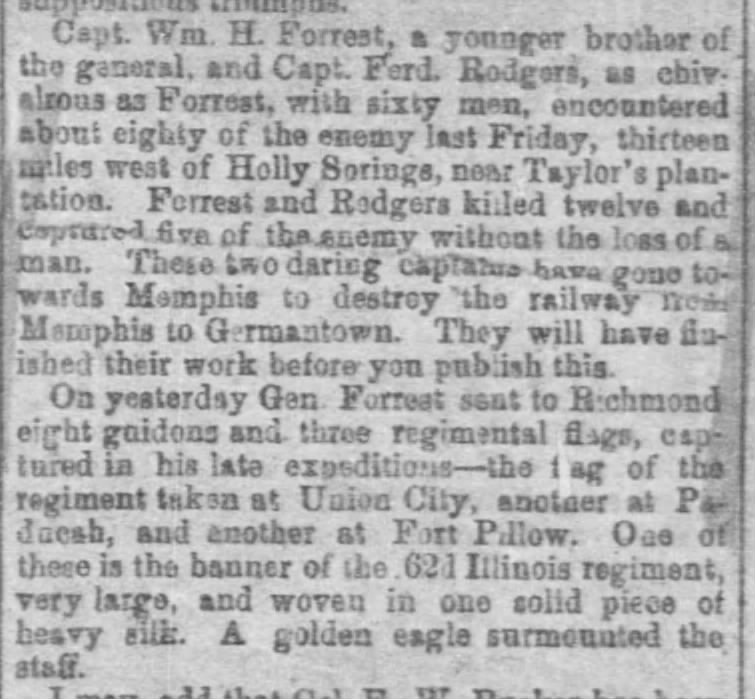
Forrest in a fight 14 miles (23 km) west of Holly Springs, Mississippi (Memphis Daily Appeal, May 31, 1864)

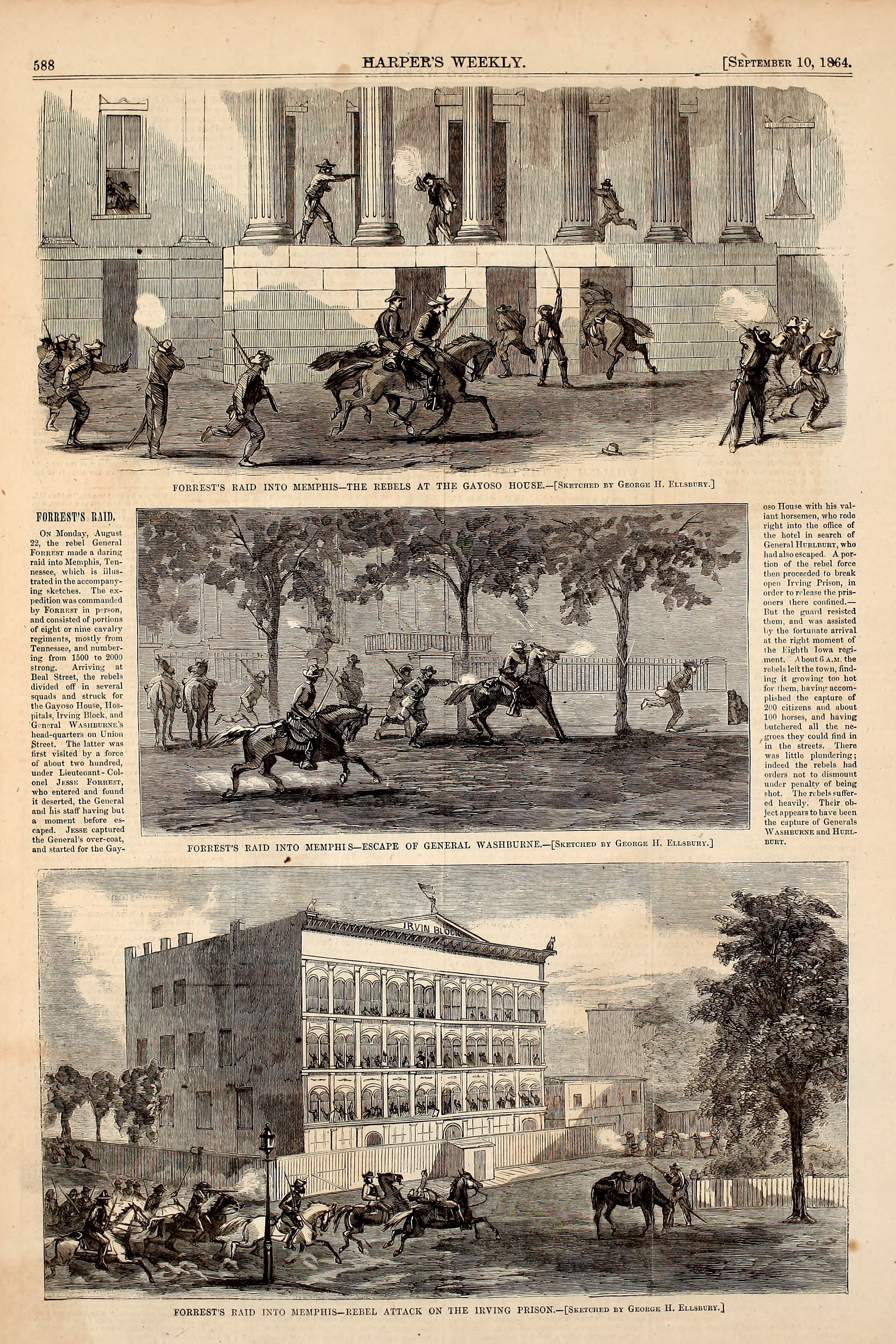
"Forrest's Raid" sketched by George H. Ellsbury (Harper's Weekly, September 10, 1864)

In August 1864, Bill Forrest was one of the leaders of Forrest's raid on Memphis, which ultimately yielded no major advantage but did plenty to embarrass U.S. Army officers who nominally controlled the town. A young Mississippian named William Brown Winter was in the unit led by Bill Forrest on the Memphis raid; "on the outskirts of Memphis they rode through a camp of black Union troops and shot it up." Forrest and his company rode their horses into the lobby of the elegant Gayoso Hotel, "where he thumped on his desk with the butt end of his revolver to gain the attention of the clerk," and "there gave further instructions to his men, who barred all egress and streamed through the corridors in search of their prey." Forrest's mission was capturing General Stephen A. Hurlbut, but Hurlburt "happened to be staying that night in the quarters of a colonel friend and thus missed capture." The U.S. Army gathered their forces in due course and began to run the rebels back out of town, and "a battery that Bill Forrest had run over but had not stopped to spike now gave the retiring raiders trouble, but they were soon withdrawing from the city with their captures, about six hundred men, a number of horses and mules, and private plunder." The hotel later installed a bronze plaque in the lobby commemorating the raid.

In April 1865, after Robert E. Lee had surrendered the Army of Northern Virginia at Appomattox Court House, but before Bedford Forrest resigned in May 1865, Bill Forrest continued to battle. According to one news account, "Seventeen men of the 11th New York Cavalry, under command of a Lieutenant, were bushwhacked near Germantown this morning by about 100 rebels under Capt. Bill Forrest, and all but one officer and two others killed, wounded or captured. A force of 100 Federals was sent in pursuit from Germantown, but failed to overtake the enemy. They found eight of their comrades, dead, along the road. Four were shot through the heart."

== After the war ==
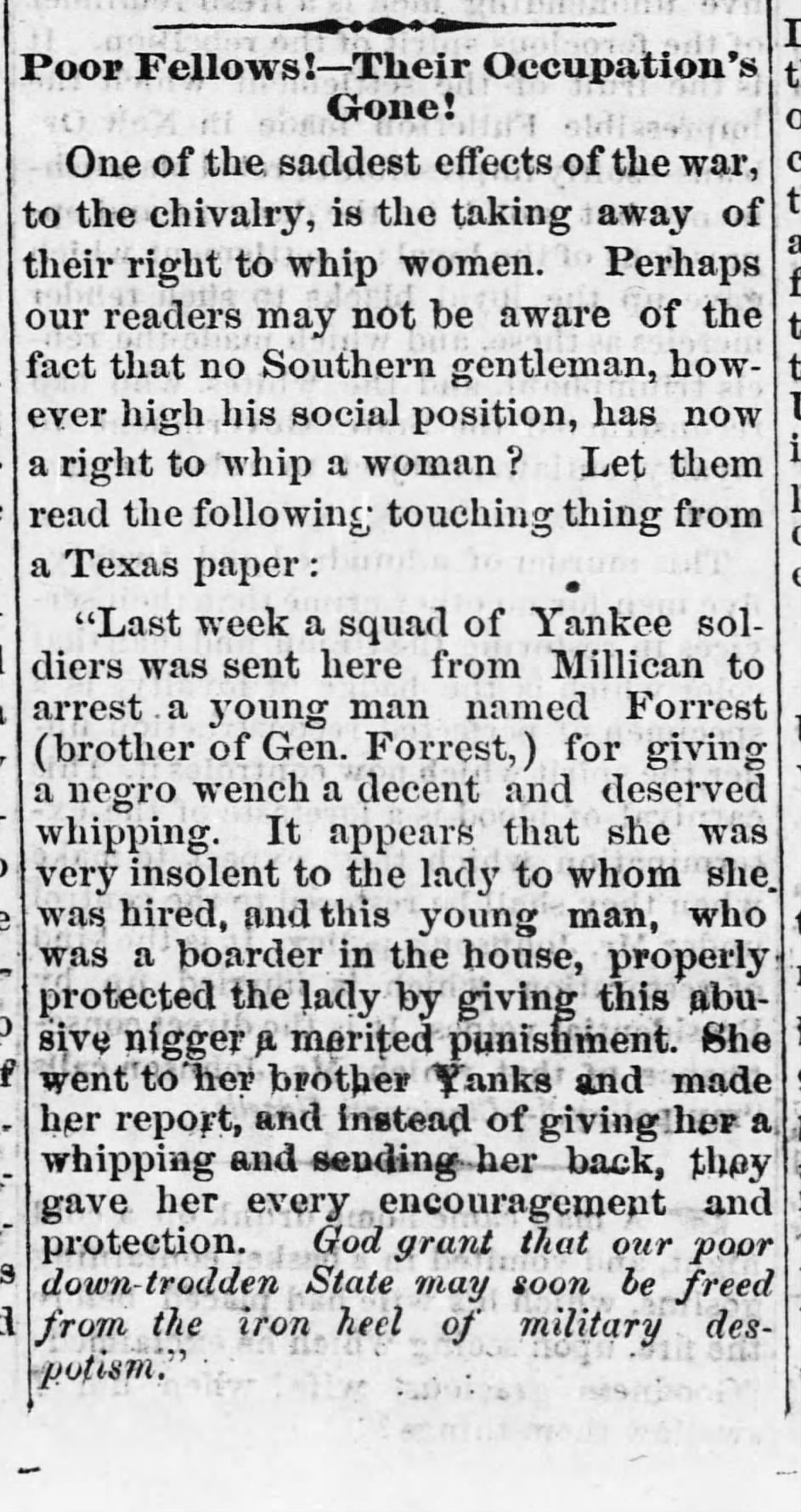
There were only four of the six Forrest brothers remaining at the end of the American Civil War ("Poor Fellows!—Their Occupation's Gone!" The Wyandot Pioneer, Wyandot, Ohio, August 9, 1866)

In 1930, Warmoth wrote of Bill Forrest, "He spent some time in New Orleans after the War and he well remembered our contests and the incidents of the battles which we fought. There was a pretty girl living near Cherokee Station. We fought and drove each other to and fro by this girl's home day after day for a week. She said that Colonel Forrest was her 'Rebel Sweetheart' and that I was her 'Yankee Sweetheart.'"

Post-bellum, William H. Forrest was involved in a number of shootings that made headlines in part due to his brother's fame. The most consequential of these was the assassination of a disabled U.S. Army veteran and Freedmen's Bureau sub-commissioner from Rhode Island named J. B. Blanding, who was shot twice in the head while out on an evening walk in Grenada, Mississippi, likely by a man named Tom Wilson. Forrest, described by the Freedmen's Bureau as the leader of a gang of local thugs, later clubbed a man who dared suggest there was anything amiss in Yalobusha County. The Freedmen's Bureau investigated the incident, which led to increased military presence in the region, but no arrests were ever made.

There were at least four other shootings involving Bill Forrest. The Memphis Avalanche commented about Forrest at the time of the 1874 incident in Hot Springs, Arkansas: "He has 'planted' his man and oftentimes men in very near all the Southern States and is about the last man for a noncombatant to rush up against." When William H. Forrest died in 1875, the Tuskaloosa Gazette of Tuscaloosa, Alabama wrote "Capt. Forrest was a brave man, and never took undue advantage of an enemy, however he was so dangerous that society will be better off because of his death."

Shootings (alleged)
Date	State	City or county	Opponent or victim	Allies or accomplices	Outcome	Notes
April 30, 1866	Mississippi	Grenada	Lt. J. B. Blanding	Tom Wilson	Blanding killed by three shots	Forrest named as prime suspect in news coverage and Freedmen's Bureau files
November 29, 1868	Tennessee	Memphis	Judge P. M. Dickinson, Officer Schoeke	Bedford Forrest, Jesse Forrest	Officer Schoeke gut-shot by Wm. H. Forrest, in critical condition as of newspaper deadline	Wm. H. Forrest arrested, $4,000 bail
November 1, 1869	Alabama	Marion	Col. John S. Smith		Smith killed	Smith attended Amherst College for two years and served as adjutant-general for the 20th Alabama and later an Alabama brigade; Forrest not arrested as of Thursday after Monday shooting
October 29, 1872	Mississippi	Aberdeen	Lucius Morgan, Steve Moore killed	Harry Cozart, "and another man"		Forrest escaped, others captured
June 26, 1874	Arkansas	Hot Springs	Billy Davis	n/a	Davis shot three times, one self-inflicted, doctors hopeful of his survival	Forrest arrested, $500 bond

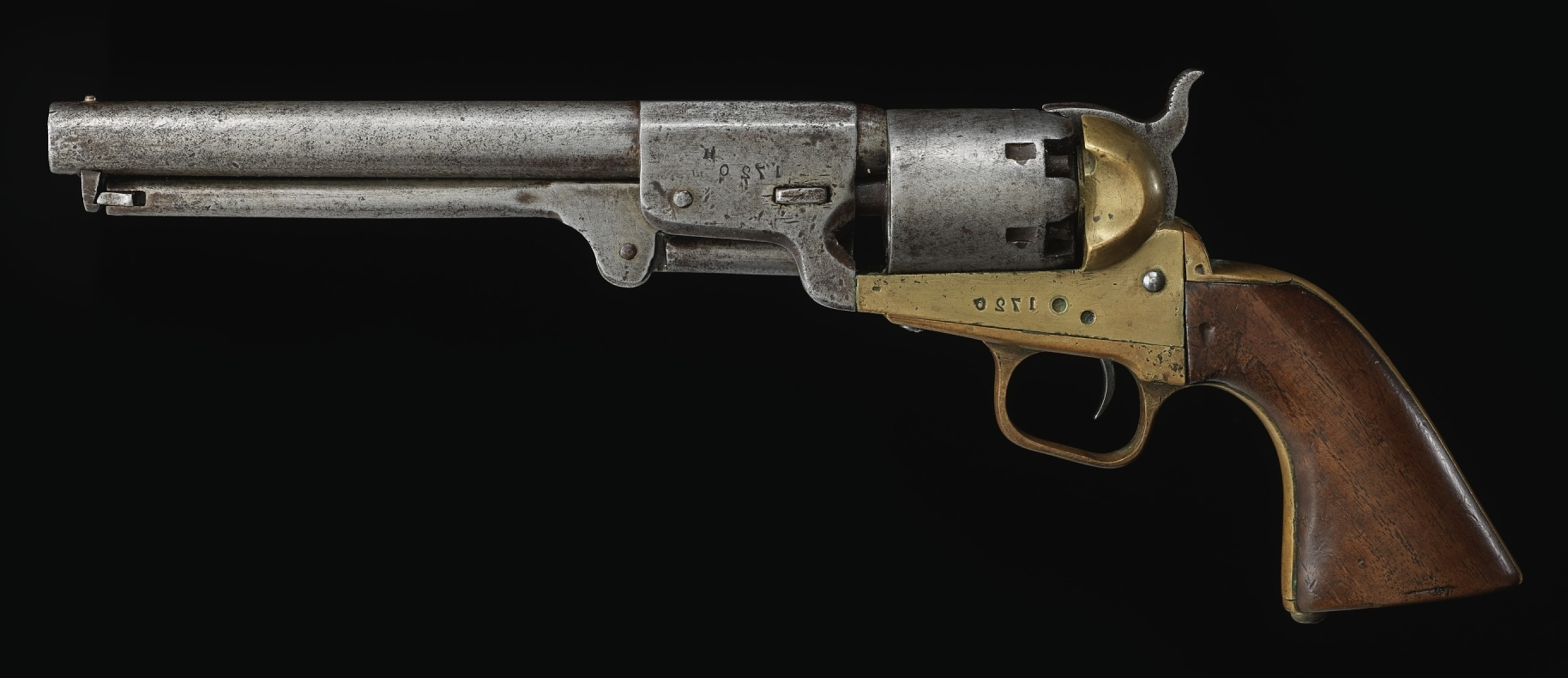
Confederate-manufactured version of Colt's Navy Six gun, a popular revolver (National Museum of American History)

Forrest died at his brother Jesse Forrest's house in 1875; the cause was said to be "congestion stomach." The journalist Lafcadio Hearn attended Nathan Bedford Forrest's funeral in 1877 (two years after the death of Bill Forrest) and reported his observations in the Cincinnati Commercial newspaper, writing:

It was a terrible family, this Forrest family. There were seven boys and three girls; the eldest of the sons being Nathan Bedford. All the sons grew up to be fighting men; and several were killed in the ranks of the Confederacy. There was only one of the seven, however, who turned out to be what we might really term a desperado, and that was Bill Forrest, the only man General Forrest used to say that he ever felt afraid of. (Note: A history of Reconstruction in Marshall County, Mississippi published in 1912 alleged that "Capt. Bill Forrest, brother of General Forrest, once said that Jim Millaney was the only man he was afraid of.") "No one living," said the General, "can tell when Bill's going to get mad." And whenever Bill got mad he shot, and he never missed his man. "He used to carry a 'navy' about this long," said my informant, putting his hands three feet apart, "and wore a long coat to hide it." Bill killed men almost at regular intervals, both before and after the war. I am told he killed many during the war, but that, I suppose, was legitimate. Since the war he slew men in Mississippi, and Alabama, and Georgia, and had to leave various cities in those various States because of these things. Where known he was feared, as a Western chronicler said of a border desperado, "much more than the Almighty." Yet he had many warm friends, and might have settled down into a man of peace had he not finally killed himself by dissipation.

== See also ==
- History of slavery in Tennessee
- List of American slave traders
- Forrest's Cavalry Corps
- List of Tennessee Confederate Civil War units
- Mat Luxton
