= List of Phi Kappa Tau members =

Phi Kappa Tau is a college fraternity that was founded in 1906 at Miami Univeristy in Oxford, Ohio. The following is a list of notable members of Phi Kappa Tau;. the dates following college names are fraternity initiation dates.

== Academia ==
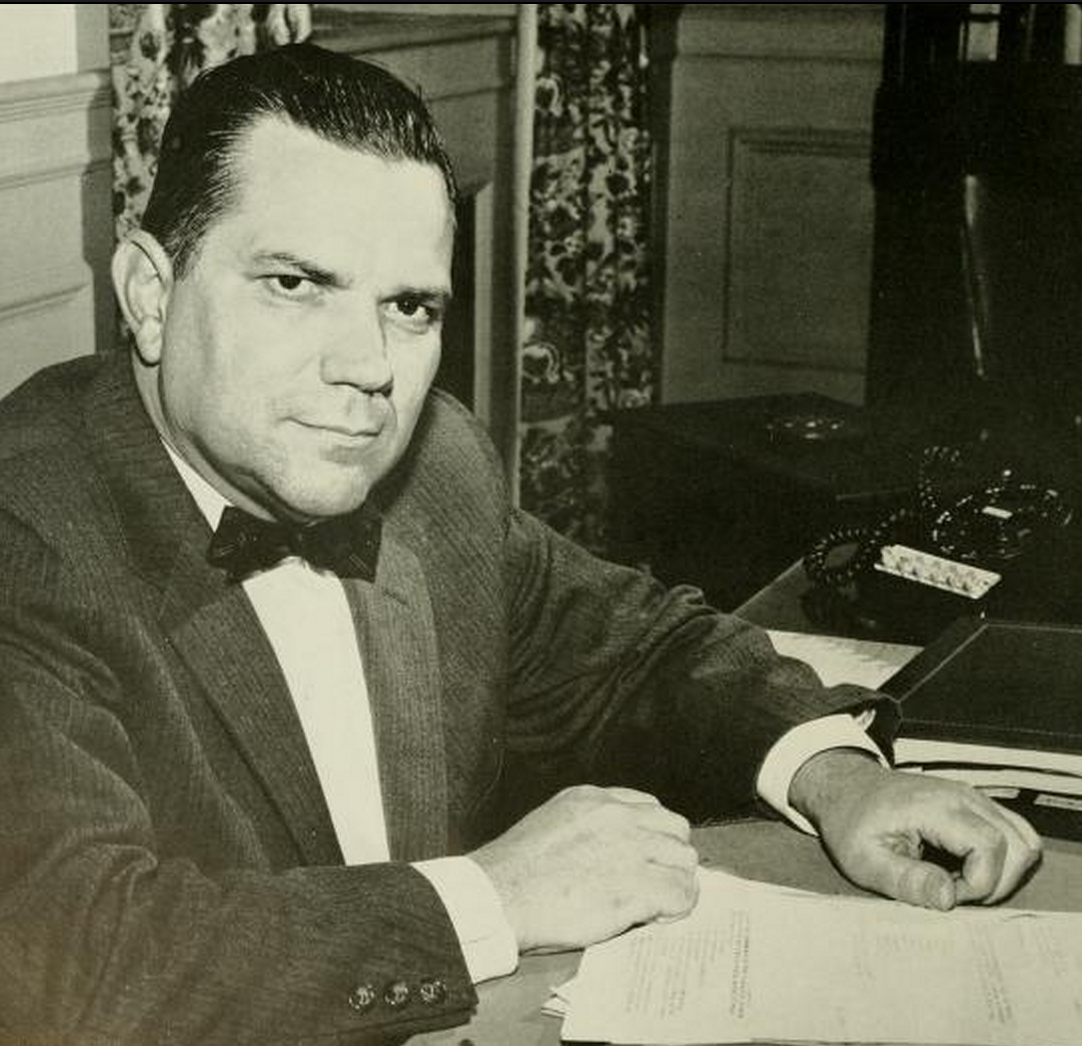
William Brantley Aycock, chancellor of UNC-Chapel Hill, 1957–1964

- William Brantley Aycock (North Carolina State University 1934), chancellor of University of North Carolina at Chapel Hill, 1957–1964
- Everett Smith Beneke (Miami University 1937), professor at Michigan State University; noted mycologist
- George O. Bierkoe (Muhlenberg College 1920), co-founder and first president of Endicott College, 1939–1971
- Edgar Ewing Brandon (Miami University 1906), acting president, Miami University, 1909–10, 1926–7
- Paul William Brosman (University of Illinois 1919), dean of the Tulane Law School, 1937–51
- Charles F. Chapman (Cornell University 1930), founder of Charles F. Chapman School of Seamanship
- Ward Darley, MD (University of Colorado 1924), president, University of Colorado, 1953–1956
- Paul H. Emmett, Ph.D. (Oregon State University 1925), chair of the Department of Chemical Engineering at Johns Hopkins University; member of the Manhattan Project
- Walter S. Gamertsfelder (Ohio University 1952), president, Ohio University, 1943–1945
- Benjamin Hudson, Ph.D. (Penn State 1974), professor of history and medievalist, Penn State University
- William N. Johnston (Westminster College 1969), president of Wesley College (Delaware)
- Grayson L. Kirk (Miami University 1921), president of Columbia University, 1953–1968
- Richard Kneedler (Franklin and Marshall 1962), president of Franklin and Marshall College, 1988–2002
- Paul Moyer Limbert (Franklin and Marshall 1921), secretary general of the World Alliance of YMCAs; president of Springfield College
- J. Sterling Livingston (University of Southern California 1937), professor of Harvard Business School, 1941–71
- Charles F. Marsh (College of William and Mary 1933), president of Wofford College, 1958–1968
- Robert Lee Mills (University of Kentucky 1935), president of Georgetown College, 1959–1978
- Roger Morse, Ph.D. (Cornell University 1948), chair of the Cornell department of entomology; expert on beekeeping
- O. Frederick Nolde (Muhlenberg College 1918), dean of the Lutheran Theological Seminary at Philadelphia; first director of the World Council of Churches Commission of the Churches on International Affairs (CCIA); contributor to the Universal Declaration of Human Rights
- Lee Oras Overholts (Miami University 1910), mycologist and professor, Penn State University
- Charles Lynn Pyatt (Transylvania University 1921), dean of the College of the Bible
- Alfred Rieber (Colgate University 1950), historian and professor
- William H. Shideler (Miami University 1906), founder and chair of the Department of Geology at Miami University; founder of Phi Kappa Tau
- Richard C. Starr (Indiana University 1955), phycologist; professor at Indiana University and University of Texas; National Academy of Sciences; Guggenheim Fellow
- William Strunk Jr. (Cornell University; member of local fraternity that became Alpha Tau chapter), author of Elements of Style
- Paul B. Thompson (Georgia Tech 1972), philosopher and professor emeritus, Michigan State University
- James J. Whalen (Franklin and Marshall 1947), president of Ithaca College, 1975–1997

== Business and philanthropy ==
- Ewing T. Boles (Centre College 1914), president, CEO, and chairman of the Ohio Company (now Fifth Third Bank)
- Nickolas Davatzes (St. John's 1960), president emeritus of A&E TV network
- Robert J. Dennis (RPI 1972), chairman, chief executive officer and president of Genesco
- Malcolm Forbes (Miami University, Hon. 1982), former publisher of Forbes magazine
- William F. Kerby (University of Michigan, 1927), former chairman, of Dow Jones and Company; editor of The Wall Street Journal
- Mark Mandala (University of Southern California, 1956), former president ABC Television
- Lee Miglin (University of Illinois, 1950), Chicago real estate developer and philanthropist
- Floyd R. Newman (Cornell University), founder, Allied Oil Co.
- William Schwendler (New York University 1932), chairman of the Grumman Aircraft Corporation
- Ernest H. Volwiler (Miami University, 1912), former chairman of Abbott Laboratories; co-inventor of Pentothal
- George Wedgworth (Michigan State 1947), Florida agriculture executive and leader

== Entertainment ==
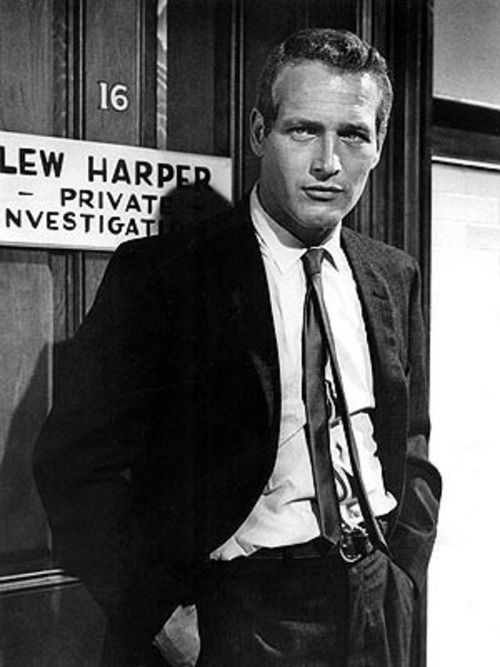
Paul Newman, Academy Award-winning actor, race-car driver, and philanthropist

- Ralph Arlyck (Colgate University 1959), independent filmmaker
- Frank P. Austin (University of Cincinnati 1957), celebrity interior designer, designed Playboy Mansion interiors
- Lennie Baker (Northeastern University 1966), co-founder and retired president of the group Sha Na Na
- Bob Balaban (Colgate University 1964), actor, director, author
- Richard Barsam (University of Southern California 1956), author and film historian
- John Beradino (University of Southern California 1936), actor, General Hospital (played Dr. Steve Hardy) (also see sports)
- Shelley Berman (University of Southern California Hon. 2005), actor and comedian
- Ned Brooks (Ohio State University 1922), moderator of NBC's Meet the Press, 1953–1965
- Marc Butan (Ohio State University 1992), film producer and founder of MadRiver Pictures
- Joseph W. Clokey (Miami University 1910), composer
- Jerry Clower (Mississippi State University 1949), comedian and member of the Grand Ole Opry
- Robert Dalva (Colgate University 1961), Academy Award-nominated film editor
- Frank Dungan (Bowling Green State University 1964), Emmy Award-winning TV writer/producer
- John Dykstra (Cal State-Long Beach 1966), winner of Academy Awards for visual effects and special effects
- Rick Evans (Nebraska Wesleyan University 1961), writer of In the Year 2525 as part of the group Zager and Evans
- Bob Heil (University of Illinois), noted rock sound engineer and inventor of the Heil Talk Box
- Lew Hunter (Nebraska Wesleyan University 1952), screenwriter; chair emeritus of UCLA screenwriting program
- Ben Johnston (William & Mary 1949), composer and professor of music
- Fred Knoth (University of Colorado 1927), special effects head at Universal Studios; 1954 Academy Award for Technical Achievement
- Paul Newman (Ohio University 1943), actor, philanthropist, director, race car driver, founder of Newman's Own
- Patton Oswalt (College of William & Mary 1989), actor, comedian
- Basil Poledouris (University of Southern California 1964), composer and conductor
- Stephen Sommers (University of Southern California 1983), movie director. producer and screenwriter
- John Stirratt (University of Mississippi 1986), bassist with the band Wilco
- Bruce Sussman (Franklin and Marshall College 1971), songwriter and librettist
- Ernest Vajda (University of Southern California 1938), playwright, novelist and screenwriter
- Kitt Wakeley (East Central Oklahoma 1987), Grammy Award-winning composer, songwriter, musician, and music producer
- Jackie Walker (University of California Los Angeles 1957), singer and songwriter
- Chad Warrix, Eastern Kentucky University 2012 (honorary), musician and songwriter
- Guy Williams (Mississippi State University 1989), 3-time Academy Award nominee for visual effects
- Matthew Yuricich (Miami University 1946), Academy Award winner for visual effects

== Law ==
- Jeffrey L. Amestoy (Hobart College 1965), former chief justice, Vermont Supreme Court; former attorney general of Vermont
- C. Clyde Atkins (University of Florida 1935), judge, U.S. District Court for the Southern District of Florida, 1966–99
- Guy K. Bard (Franklin and Marshall 1921), judge, U.S. District Court for the Eastern District of Pennsylvania, 1937, 1939–1952
- Richard Ervin (University of Florida 1926), chief justice, Florida Supreme Court, 1964–1975
- Lawrence H. Framme III (Centre College 1968), former chair, Democratic Party of Virginia
- Ralph M. Freeman (University of Michigan 1923), judge, U.S. District Court for the Eastern District of Michigan, 1954–1990
- John M. Gerrard (Nebraska Wesleyan University 1973), judge, U.S. District Court for the District of Nebraska; former Nebraska Supreme Court judge
- Robert E. Holmes (Ohio University 1941), justice, Ohio Supreme Court, 1978–1992
- David L. Huber (University of Louisville 1962), United States attorney for the Western District of Kentucky
- Harry Huge (Nebraska Wesleyan University 1956), internationally known trial attorney
- David M. Ishee (University of Southern Mississippi 1982), associate justice, Supreme Court of Mississippi
- James Lawrence King (University of Florida 1946), judge, U.S. District Court for the Southern District of Florida
- Richard G. Kopf (University of Nebraska-Kearney 1966), senior judge, U.S. District Court for the District of Nebraska
- James B. Milliken (Centre College 1918), judge, Kentucky Court of Appeals (now Kentucky Supreme Court), 1951–75; chief justice, 1956–57, 1963–64, 1971–73
- James Moeller (Nebraska Wesleyan University 1952), vice chief justice, Arizona Supreme Court, 1987–1998
- Hugh M. Morris (University of Delaware 1930), judge, U.S. District Court for the District of Delaware, 1919–30
- Theodore Olson (University of the Pacific 1961), former solicitor general of the United States
- Robert J. Parrillo (University of Colorado 1960), personal injury attorney
- Kenneth L. Ryskamp (University of Miami 1954), judge, U.S. District Court for the Southern District of Florida
- Lee Solomon (Muhlenberg College 1972), justice of the New Jersey Supreme Court
- Albert Lee Stephens, Jr. (University of Southern California 1933), judge, U.S. District Court for the Central District of California, 1961–2001
- Albert Lee Stephens, Sr. (University of Southern California Hon.), judge, U.S. Court of Appeals for the Ninth Circuit, 1937–1965

== Literature and journalism ==
- Jack L. Anson (Colgate University 1947), editor of Baird's Manual of American College Fraternities; former executive director of the North American Interfraternity Conference
- Joseph M. Bachelor (Miami University 1911), poet (pen name Joseph Morris), professor
- E. Garrett Bewkes IV (Colgate University 2007), publisher, National Review
- Joseph C. Goulden (University of Texas-Austin), best-selling author and political writer
- John McCallum (Washington State University 1946), writer

== Politics and government ==
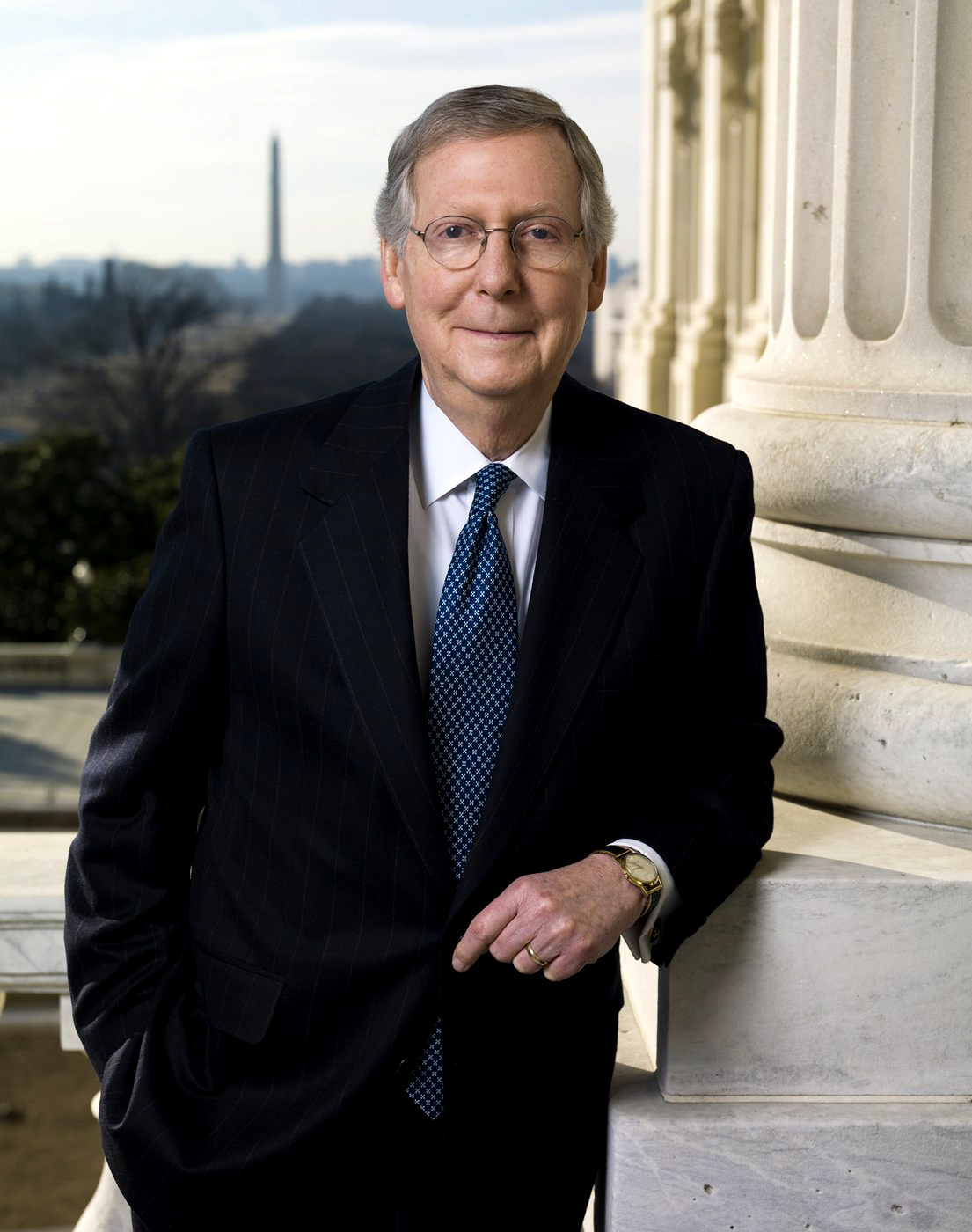
Mitch McConnell, U.S. senator (R-Kentucky)

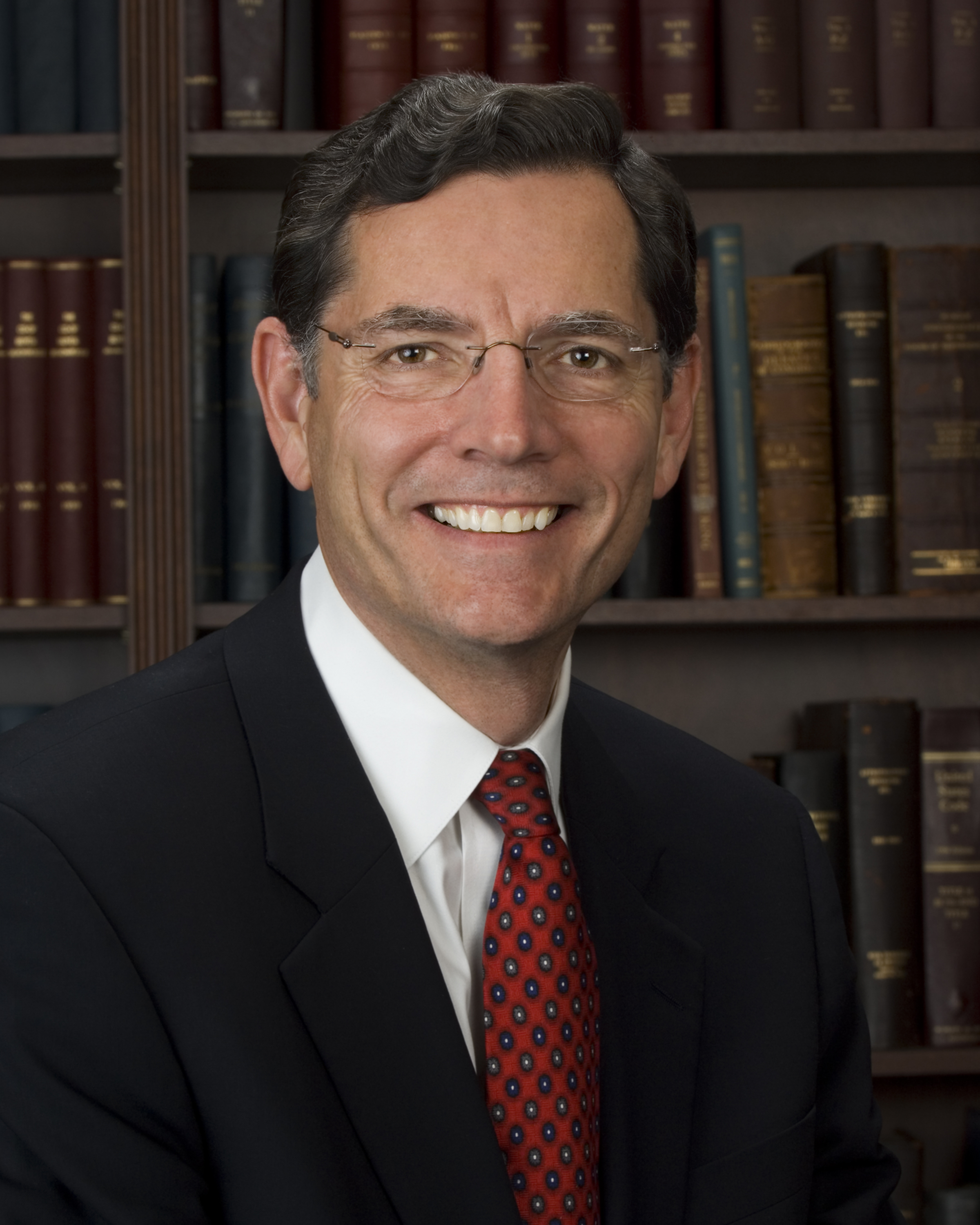
John Barrasso, U.S. senator (R-Wyoming)

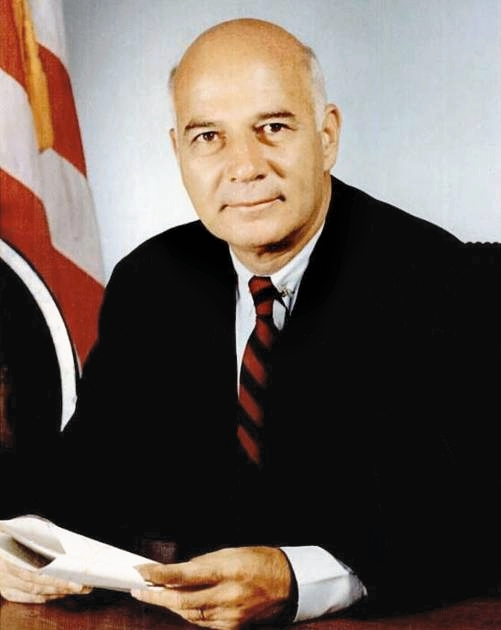
Paul Ignatius, former secretary of the Navy

- Spencer Bachus (Auburn University 1967), U.S. House of Representatives, Alabama
- David Baria (University of Southern Mississippi), Mississippi state senator 2008–2011, Mississippi House of Representatives, 2011–present
- John Barrasso (Rensselaer Polytechnic Institute 1971), U.S. senator, Wyoming
- Ray C. Bliss (University of Akron 1938), chairman of the Republican National Committee, 1965–1969
- John Y. Brown, Sr. (Centre College 1917), U.S. House of Representatives, Kentucky, 1933–35
- Randy Christmas (University of Miami 1948), mayor of Miami, Florida
- E. Virgil Conway (Colgate University 1948), chairman of the board of the MTA, New York City
- John Cosgrove (University of Florida 1968), attorney; member of the Florida House of Representatives; mayor of Cutler Bay, Florida
- C. Welborn Daniel (University of Florida 1947), member of the Florida House of Representatives, 1956–1964; member of the Florida Senate, 1963–1966, 1968–1971
- Mike Dovilla (Baldwin–Wallace College 1994), member of the Ohio House of Representatives, 2011–present
- Gerald A. Drew (University of California, Berkeley 1922), U.S. ambassador to Haiti and Bolivia
- John T. Elfvin (Cornell University 1938), judge, U.S. District Court for the Western District of New York
- Josh Fryday (California-Berkeley 1999), candidate for California lieutenant governor 2026
- Fred Hall (University of Southern California 1935), governor of Kansas, 1955–1957
- Joseph Hernandez (University of Florida 1996), entrepreneur; Republican candidate for New York State Comptroller, 2026
- William Gardner Hewes (University of Southern Mississippi 1981), mayor of Gulfport, Mississippi; Mississippi State Senate, 1982–2012; Mississippi Senate president pro tempore, 2008–2012
- Robert Hilkemann (Nebraska Wesleyan University 1966), Nebraska legislator
- Trent Kelly (University of Mississippi 1987), U.S. House of Representatives, Mississippi 2015–
- Tom Kunse (Michigan Technological University, Michigan House of Representatives 100th District 2022–
- William C. Lantaff (University of Florida 1931), U.S. House of Representatives, Florida, 1951–55
- Joseph M. Martinez Jr. (Florida State 1949), member, Florida House of Representatives
- Mitch McConnell (University of Louisville 1961), U.S. senator, Commonwealth of Kentucky
- William E. McVey (Ohio University 1915), U.S. House of Representatives, Illinois, 1951–58
- Ken Mehlman (Franklin and Marshall College 1985), Republican National Committee Chairman, 2005–07
- Robert Moak (University of Mississippi 1979), member, Mississippi House of Representatives
- James D. Oberweis (University of Illinois 1966), member, Illinois Senate; owner of Oberweis Dairy
- Verle Pope (University of Florida 1962), president of the Florida Senate, 1966–68
- John Redwine (University of Kansas 1969), former member, Iowa Senate
- Thomas C. Sawyer (University of Akron 1966), U.S. House of Representatives, Ohio, 1987–2003
- George V. Voinovich (Ohio University 1956), former US senator, Ohio
- Joseph R. Wright (University of Kentucky 1959), Kentucky Senate 1976–92, owner of Wright Implement

== Military ==
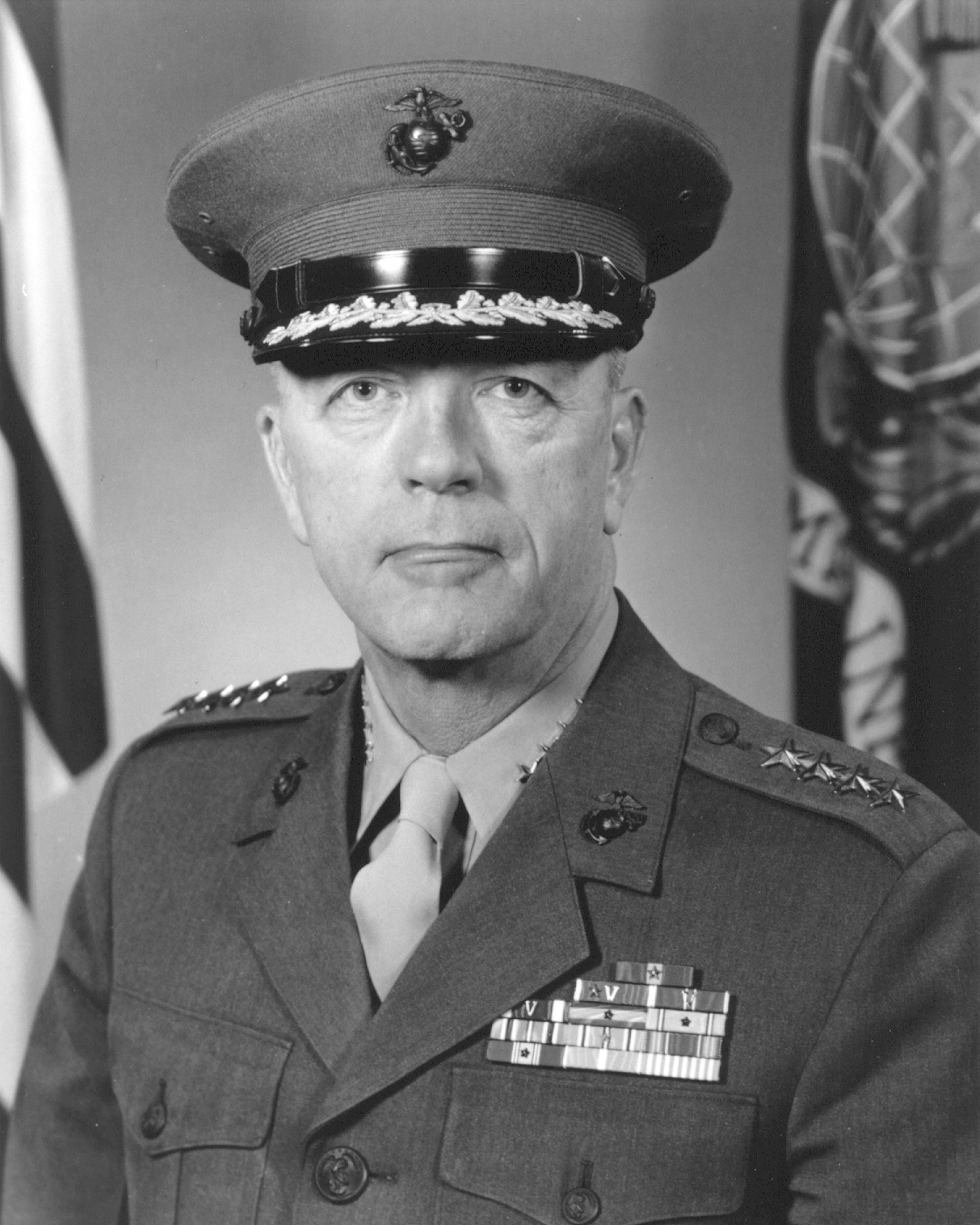
Gen. Leonard F. Chapman, Jr. commandant, United States Marine Corps 1968–1972

- Robert Arter (Ohio University 1947), retired major general, U.S. Army; commanding general, Sixth United States Army
- Donald V. Bennett (Michigan State University 1934), general, U.S. Army; 47th superintendent of the United States Military Academy, 1966–69
- Leonard F. Chapman, Jr. (University of Florida 1932), commandant, United States Marine Corps, 1968–1972
- Donald R. Delauter (University of Maryland, College Park 1952), retired brigadier general, U.S. Air Force
- George S. Howard (Ohio Wesleyan University 1928), former commander and music director of The United States Air Force Band
- Paul Robert Ignatius (University of Southern California 1938), secretary of the Navy, 1967–1969; former president of The Washington Post
- James G. Jones (Miami University 1953), retired major general, U.S. Air Force
- Rodney P. Kelly (Southern Illinois University-Carbondale 1963), retired major general, U.S. Air Force
- Robert J. Meder (Miami University 1936), member of the Doolittle Raiders of World War II
- Carl E. Mundy, Jr. (Auburn University 1955), retired general, commandant, United States Marine Corps, 1991–1995
- Jerry D. Page (University of Southern California 1936), major general, U.S. Air Force; commandant, Air War College
- Virgil A. Richard (Oklahoma State University 1957), retired brigadier general, U.S. Army
- Cornelius E. Ryan (University of California-Berkeley 1931), major general, United States Army
- Joseph K. Spiers (North Carolina State University 1956), retired major general, U.S. Air Force; commander of Oklahoma City Air Logistics Center, Tinker Air Force Base
- Colonel Walbrook D. Swank (Ohio State University 1933), command personnel officer, USAF
- Walter H. Yates, Jr. (University of Southern Mississippi 1962), retired major general, U.S. Army; deputy commanding general, Fifth United States Army

== Science, technology, and medicine ==
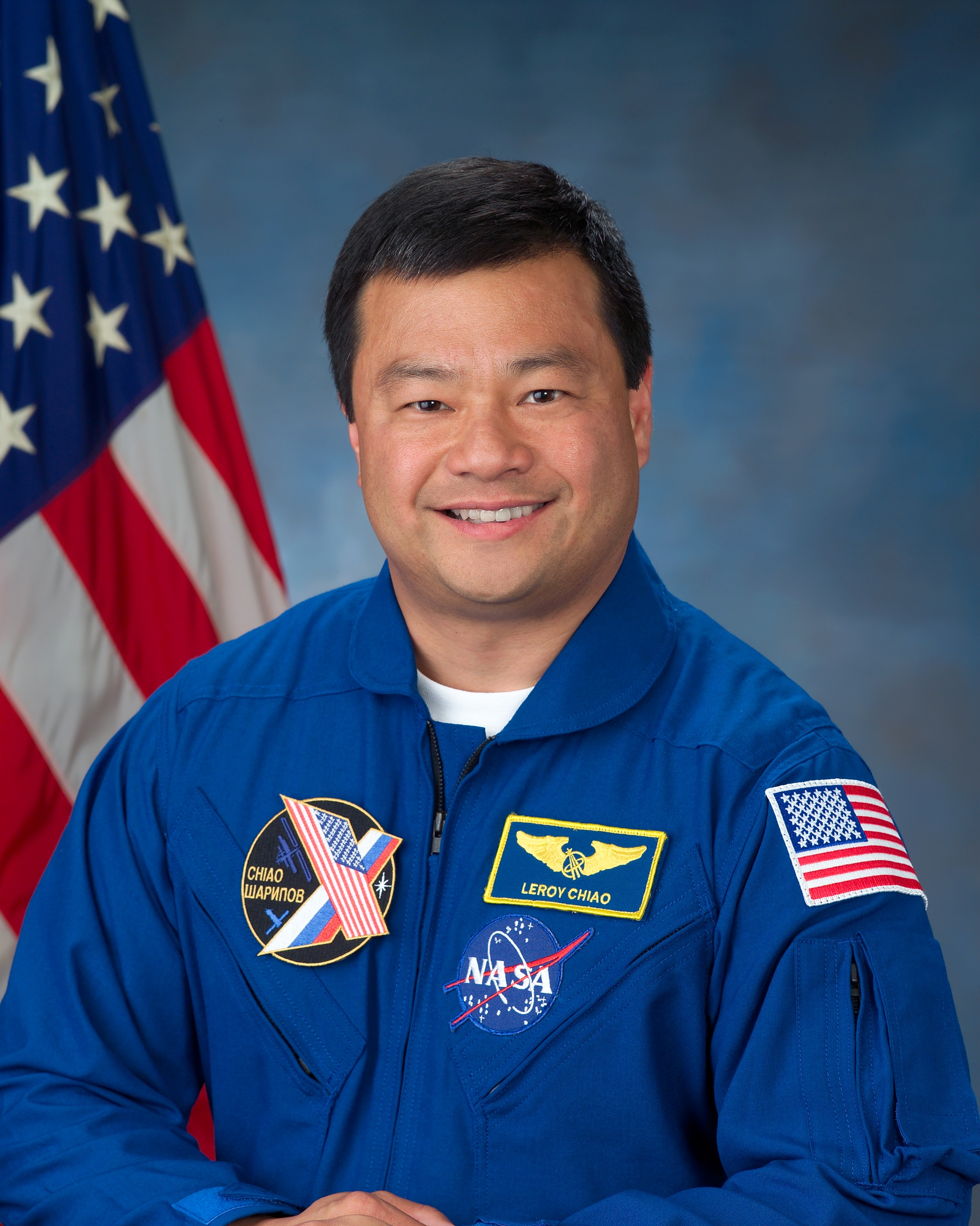
Leroy Chiao, astronaut

- Brett Adcock (University of Florida 2004), tech entrepreneur
- William F. Ballhaus, Jr. (University of California, Berkeley 1964), president and CEO of The Aerospace Corporation
- Charles Bassett (Ohio State University 1951), NASA astronaut
- Kenneth N. Beers, M.D. (Muhlenberg College 1949), NASA flight surgeon; professor emeritus at Wright State Medical School
- Taylor A. Borradaile (Miami 1906) chemist; founder of Phi Kappa Tau
- Leroy Chiao (University of California, Berkeley 1979), NASA astronaut
- Vincent T. DeVita, Jr., MD (College of William and Mary 1955), leading oncologist
- John R. Dunning (Nebraska Wesleyan University 1926), key player in the Manhattan Project to create the atom bomb
- John E. Fryer, M.D. (Transylvania University 1954), pioneering psychiatrist and gay rights advocate
- Paul C. Lauterbur (Case Western Reserve 1951), 2003 Nobel Laureate in medicine for work in developing the MRI
- Clyde Roper, Ph.D. (Transylvania University 1956), zoologist at the Smithsonian Institution
- M. Frank Rudy (Case Western Reserve 1948), inventor of Nike "Air" sole
- John G. Webster (Cornell University 1950), pioneer in biomechanical engineering

== Religion ==
- Martin Scott Field (Bethany College 1975), bishop, Episcopal Diocese of West Missouri
- David Moyer (Muhlenberg College 1970), former Anglican bishop

== Sports ==
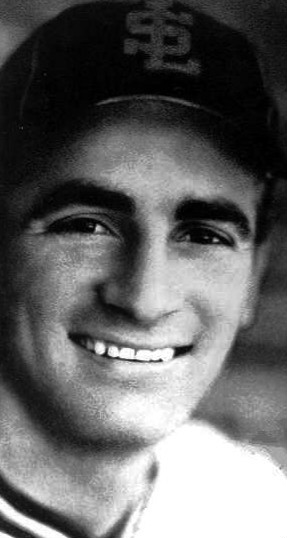
John Beradino, baseball player (St. Louis Browns) and actor

Matthew Mann, swimming coach, 1952 Olympics

- Bob Atha (Ohio State 1981), Ohio State football player
- Elliott Avent (North Carolina State University 1975), head baseball coach, NC State
- Johnny Baker (University of Southern California 1929), 1931 All-American football player at USC; athletic director at Sacramento State
- Babe Barna (West Virginia University 1934), professional baseball player, 1937–43
- Al Barry (University of Southern California 1953), pro football player with the Green Bay Packers, New York Giants, and Los Angeles Chargers
- Dick Bass (Miami University 1927), pitcher with the Washington Senators
- John Beradino (University of Southern California 1936), baseball player with the St. Louis Browns, Cleveland Indians, Pittsburgh Pirates (also see entertainment)
- Rob Bironas (Eastern Kentucky University 2012 (honorary), kicker with the Tennessee Titans
- Paul O. Bixler (Mount Union 1925), head football coach at Ohio State University, Colgate University; assistant coach and director of player personnel for the Cleveland Browns
- William R. "Bob" Boyd (University of Southern California 1949), men's basketball coach at University of Southern California, 1967–79
- Roger Counsil (Southern Illinois University 1957), national champion gymnastics coach, Indiana State University
- Dave Davis (University of Southern California 1958), Olympic shot-putter
- Paul Dekker (Michigan State University 1953), pro football player with the Washington Redskins and Hamilton Tiger-Cats
- Otis Douglas (College of William and Mary 1929), player with the Philadelphia Eagles, 1946–49; college football coach at Akron and Arkansas; pro coach at Akron, Baltimore and Calgary Canada
- Johnny Edwards (Ohio State University 1957), baseball player with the Cincinnati Reds, St. Louis Cardinals, Houston Astros; All-Star Team, 1963, 1964, 1965
- Byron Gentry (University of Southern California 1929), football player with the Pittsburgh Pirates (now Pittsburgh Steelers), 1937–1939
- Bob Goin (Bethany College 1956), athletic director at Florida State University and University of Cincinnati
- Marc Guley (Syracuse University 1936), head basketball coach at Syracuse University, 1951–62
- Hal Herring (Auburn University 1947), football player with the Buffalo Bills, 1949, and Cleveland Browns, 1950–52; assistant coach at Auburn University, Atlanta Falcons and San Diego Chargers
- Mike Hudock (University of Miami 1957), College All-Star center; professional player with the New York Titans and New York Jets
- Dave Hyde (Miami University 1980), sports columnist for the South Florida Sun-Sentinel
- Darrall Imhoff (University of California, Berkeley 1958), former NBA player; Olympic gold medalist
- Martin Kottler (Centre College 1930), charter member of the 1933 Pittsburgh Steelers
- Walt Kowalczyk (Michigan State University ), professional football player
- Wendell Ladner (The University of Southern Mississippi 1970), pro basketball player, ABA (Memphis Pros) and NBA (New York Nets)
- Ted Leitner (Oklahoma State University 1967), play-by-play broadcast announcer, San Diego Padres
- Keith Lincoln (Washington State University 1959), football player with the San Diego Chargers
- Dale Livingston (Western Michigan University 1965), football player with the Cincinnati Bengals and Green Bay Packers
- Frank Loebs (Purdue 1934), head football coach, Washington University
- Bill Mallory (Miami 1954), retired head football coach at Indiana University
- Matthew Mann (University of Michigan 1926), swimming coach, University of Michigan and 1952 Summer Olympics men's team
- Ray B. McCandless (Nebraska Wesleyan University 1923), college football, baseball and basketball coach
- Bud Metheny (College of William and Mary 1935), baseball player with the New York Yankees, 1943–46; coach, Old Dominion University
- Jess Mortensen (University of Southern California 1928), captain of the 1930 national champion track team at USC; coach of seven national champion track teams at USC
- Pete Newell (University of California, Berkeley 1958), retired general manager of the Los Angeles Lakers
- Bob Osgood (University of Michigan 1934), world champion hurdler
- Richard O. Papenguth (University of Michigan 1923), swimming coach, Purdue University and 1952 Summer Olympics women's team
- Otto Peltzer (University of California, Berkeley 1928), world record holding runner, 800 meters, 1000 meters and 1500 meters
- Leo Raskowski (Ohio State University 1929), All-American tackle, 1926 and 1927
- Ernie Steele (University of Washington 1942), pro football player with the Philadelphia Eagles
- Tony Steponovich (University of Southern California 1927), professional football player
- Wes Stock (Washington State University 1954), pitcher with the Baltimore Orioles and Kansas City Athletics; pitching coach for the Oakland A's and Seattle Mariners
- Roger Theder (Western Michigan University 1962), head football coach at the University of California, Berkeley, 1978–81
- Charlie Tyra (University of Louisville 1955), basketball player with the American Basketball League
- Rick Villarreal (Southern Mississippi 1976), former athletic director, University of North Texas
- Sam Voinoff (Purdue University 1933), NCAA champion golf coach, Purdue University
- Norbert "Nobby" Wirkowski (Miami University 1948), quarterback and coach with the Toronto Argonauts; football coach and athletic director at York University
- Curtis Youel (University of Southern California 1931), college football coach and athletic director

=== Other ===
- Ernie Allen (University of Louisville 1965), president of the National Center for Missing and Exploited Children
- David M. Brugge (University of New Mexico 1948), anthropologist, expert on the Navajo
- Carmen Cincotti (The College of New Jersey 2012), champion competitive eater
- Arthur A. Ford (Transylvania University 1919), psychic and spiritualist
- Jeffrey Miller (Michigan State University), transferred to Kent State University and was one of four students killed there by the Ohio National Guard in 1970
- Harold E. Puthoff (University of Florida 1955), electrical engineer and parapsychologist
