= Kirby Delauter =

American businessman and politician (born 1964)

Frederick County Council, District 5
- In office December 1, 2014 – December 1, 2018
- Preceded by: Office created
- Succeeded by: Michael Blue

Frederick Board of County Commissioners
- In office 2010–2014

Personal details
- Born: 1964 (age 61–62) Waynesboro, Pennsylvania
- Party: Republican
- Profession: Businessman

Military service
- Allegiance: United States
- Branch/service: United States Army
- Years of service: 1982–1988

Kirby Delauter (born 1964) is an American businessman and politician. He is a former Commissioner of Frederick County, Maryland, and a former member of the Frederick County Council, representing District 5.

Delauter served in the United States Army between 1982 and 1988. In 1993, he bought and became president of the family construction company W.F. Delauter & Son, which was founded by his grandfather and father.

He ran on Frederick County's Republican Conservative Team slate with three other candidates and was elected to a four-year term in 2010 on the Frederick Board of County Commissioners. His campaign platform stressed fiscal responsibility and making the county business friendly.

After the county commissioner government changed into a charter government, in 2014 he defeated Democratic candidate Mark Long in the Frederick County Council District 5 election for its first representative on the new county council. In January 2015, Delauter told a Frederick News-Post reporter on Facebook that he would sue her if she used his name again without his authorization. The incident received national and international coverage, and he apologized for his remarks.

== W.F. Delauter & Son ==
Delauter is the president of W.F. Delauter & Son, a development and construction company based in Emmitsburg, Maryland. He owns over half of the company. The company was paid $525,309 by Frederick County, Maryland, to improve the Libertytown, Maryland, pump station. According to The Baltimore Sun, the company "builds roads, water and sewer systems, storm water management and other forms of infrastructure". Founded in 1955 by Delauter's grandfather, Willie F. Delauter, and his father, Russell Delauter, he bought the company in 1993. W.F. Delauter & Son does business in Maryland, Pennsylvania and Virginia.

Frederick County paid W.F. Delauter & Son $72,557 for snow removal services in 2009. Delauter said that upon being elected county commissioner, he would recuse himself on voting on issues involving his company. He would continue to bid on county projects and would consult the county's Ethics Commission if there were any issues.

W.F. Delauter & Son announced in April 2024 that it was closing. The business filed for Chapter 11 bankruptcy protection in May 2024.

== Political career ==
=== Frederick Board of County Commissioners ===
Delauter was one of a group of three politically conservative, pro-development candidates elected to the council in 2010, he Billy Shreve and Blaine Young won and dominated the 5-person Council.

He was one among 11 candidates running for five seats in 2010. In his campaign for county commissioner, Delauter's campaign plank was to cut spending and make the county more business friendly. Saying the county was too big, he supported reducing expenses by privatizing county departments. Delauter aimed to make the county more business friendly by cutting taxes and fees, as well as simplifying the permit process. He ran on Frederick County's "Republican Conservative Team" slate with three other candidates, Blaine R. Young, Kirby Delauter, Billy Shreve and C. Paul Smith, who all won. Delauter finished in fifth place, receiving 35,536 votes in the election and a seat on the five-member county board. After he was elected, he was sworn in on the Great Frederick Fair land as a commissioner on December 1, 2010.

Delauter was assigned to be a liaison to the Agriculture Business Council, Frederick Municipal Airport Commission, Retirement Plan Committee, Roads Board, Social Services Board, and the Solid Waste Advisory Committee. After he received the next county commission meeting's agenda at the end of each week, Delauter used Saturday and Sunday to review it. If he wanted clarifications, he dispatched county employees to obtain the details. He said that by the Thursday meeting, he had formed a stance on most matters.

In February 2011, Delauter joined three other county commissioners in voting 4–1 to cut $2.3 million from the county's Head Start Program. His remarks generated controversy, and were covered in The Baltimore Sun and Maryland's The Gazette. During the county meeting, he had said that women can best take care of their children by remaining married and being stay-at-home mothers. He also had cited his wife as an example, noting that although she had attended college, she stayed at home for 18 years to care for their four children.

=== Frederick County Council ===
In 2014, after voters passed a charter government initiative, the county government changed from a five-member county commission into a charter government headed by a county executive and legislated by a seven-person county council. Delauter ran for a seat on the county council in 2014. In his Frederick County Council District 5 race, Delauter campaigned on a platform of continuing to make the county business friendly. He supported implementing tax increment financing paid for by the developers that would improve the county's infrastructure. He was endorsed by Emmitsburg Mayor Donald Briggs, Thurmont Commissioner Martin Burns, and Thurmont Police Chief Greg Eyler. Several officials crossed party lines to support Delauter's Democratic opponent, Mark Long, citing their disagreements with Delauter. Thurmont Commissioner Wayne Hooper, Thurmont Mayor John Kinnaird, and Myersville Mayor Wayne Creadick supported Delauter's Democratic opponent.

After winning the election 54.72 percent to 45.13 percent, Delauter was sworn in on December 1, 2014, at the Weinberg Center for the Arts. The ceremony, which cost about $2,000, included lunch, flowers, and technical expenses. To denote his unwavering commitment to fiscal prudence, Delauter paid the county $281.36 to cover around one-eighth the ceremony's cost. He further promised not to use both his council credit card and his council expense account (which gives council members a $2,500 annual allowance for traveling and conferences).

Delauter wrote a January 3, 2015, Facebook post addressed to then Frederick News-Post journalist Bethany Rodgers in which he said "Use my name again unauthorized and you'll be paying for an Attorney. Your rights stop where mine start." The post was in response to Rodgers' article the same day about a dispute over parking spots between the county executive and the county council members. Delauter characterized an earlier article from Rodgers as a "hit piece", saying he had told her not to contact him again.

Frederick News-Post editorial page editor Cliff Cumber wrote a January 6 editorial about Delauter's Facebook posts, titled "Kirby Delauter, Kirby Delauter, Kirby Delauter", in which he discussed the First Amendment and said "We will not bend to petty intimidation tactics." The editorial mentioned "Kirby Delauter" 26 times in the article's body, not including the fact that the paragraphs' initial letters spelled out "Kirby Delauter". Viewed over 500,000 times within 24 hours, the editorial was noticed by national publications, causing #kirbydelauter to trend on Twitter. The incident received coverage from the national media including The Washington Post, the Huffington Post, and the Chicago Sun-Times and worldwide from publications in Canada, Germany, and Australia. Delauter apologized for his Facebook posts, characterizing them as "wrong and inappropriate" and affirming that "[t]he first amendment is alive and well in Frederick County".

In May 2015, County Executive Jan Gardner and Council President Bud Otis jointly introduced a law that would block a company like Delauter's W.F. Delauter & Son from competing for county contracts if a county official was financially involved with the company. When Otis and Gardner issued a joint statement in response to an ethics commission's opinion without speaking with Delauter, Delauter called Otis "chickenshit". Delauter criticized Otis, a Republican, for being "too much of a coward" and for being too "in lockstep" with Gardner, a Democrat. Gardner and Otis criticized Delauter's accusations. On August 19, 2015, the council voted 4–3 in favor the law. Delauter responded to The Frederick News-Post that his company donates roughly $10,000 to $15,000 every year to charities and that because of the council's decision, his company was no longer financially able to make donations.

In 2016, Delauter spoke with presidential candidate Donald Trump at a rally. Delauter said he voted for Trump in the 2016 presidential election and has in his office a framed and signed Trump rally admissions ticket. In 2017, Delauter declared his candidacy for the Republican primary in the race for Frederick County Executive in 2018.

=== Frederick County Executive ===
In 2018, Delauter ran for Frederick County Executive. In the Republican primary election, Delauter lost, coming in second place with 33 percent of the vote.

== Personal life ==
Delauter was born in 1964 in Waynesboro, Pennsylvania, to Russell and Marlene Delauter and grew up in Thurmont, Maryland. In his youth, Delauter played on the Thurmont Little League Baseball team. He attended Catoctin High School from which he graduated in 1982. After graduating from high school, he joined the United States Army and served until 1988.

Delauter has been married since around 1986 or 1987 to Tina Delauter, with whom he has four children, Maureen, William, Emily, and Sam. Delauter's four children attended schools in the Frederick County Public Schools system.

Prior to becoming a county commissioner, Delauter was a member of the Emmitsburg Business and Professional Association, Thurmont Board of Appeals, and Thurmont Police Commission.
