= Delauter =

Delauter is a surname, derived from French.

Notable people named Delauter include:

- Chase DeLauter (born 2001), American baseball player
- Donald R. Delauter (born 1933), USAF brigadier-general
- Kirby Delauter (born 1964), American politician
