= Billy Shreve =

American politician

Frederick County Councilmember, at-large
- In office December 1, 2014 – December 1, 2018
- Preceded by: Office created

Personal details
- Born: November 16, 1967 (age 58) Frederick, Maryland
- Party: Republican
- Education: Frederick Community College _{A.A.}
- Website: www.believeinshreve.com

Billy Shreve (born November 16, 1967) is an American politician and realtor.

== Early years ==
Shreve was born and raised in Frederick County, Maryland. He graduated from Governor Thomas Johnson High School and received an associate's degree from Frederick Community College.

== Professional career ==
Shreve has worked in real estate since 1994. Shreve sells commercial real estate at the Frederick Land Company. He also sells residential homes for Natelli Communities, which developed Urbana, Maryland, and Main Street Homes.

Shreve also works as a ski and snowboard instructor at Whitetail Ski Resort in Mercersburg, Pennsylvania.

== Political career ==
=== Frederick County Board of Commissioners ===
Shreve was one of a group of three politically conservative, pro-development candidates elected to the council in 2010; the others were Kirby Delauter and Blaine Young. Together they dominated the 5-person Council.

==== 2006 campaign ====
In 2006, while serving as chairman of the Frederick County Board of Zoning Appeals, Shreve ran as a Republican for a seat on the Frederick County Board of Commissioners.

Shreve said he would consider cutting the county's expenses and increasing taxes in order to eliminate the county's budget deficit. Shreve said that the only people who complain about taxes are senior citizens on a fixed income. He said he would freeze property taxes for property owners over 65, on a fixed-income, who have lived in the county for at least.

Shreve advocated for reducing county fees for building permits and infrastructure such as sewer hookup, claiming doing so would reduce the cost of homes.

Shreve blamed overdevelopment on the lack of planning by Frederick County, rather than by the developers who built the homes. Shreve said that Frederick County should spend its budget on its infrastructure, such as roads, schools, and water and sewer systems. Shreve supported building a Beltway around Frederick. Shreve supported giving people financial incentives to commute to work outside of rush hours in order to improve traffic.

Shreve said he would encourage developers to build affordable housing by waiving certain fees for affordable-housing projects; those county fees pay for schools and libraries. He would also create a land trust that would own the land on which affordable housing could be built; homeowners would then only own their homes, not the land the home sits on.

Shreve's candidacy was endorsed by Frederick Countians for Real Republicans Political Action Committee.

Shreve lost the Republican primary, coming in sixth place with ten percent of the vote.

==== 2010 campaign ====
In 2009, Shreve announced he would run again for the Frederick County Board of Commissioners.

Shreve said that the five most important priorities in Frederick County were education, public safety, water, solid waste, and roads. He said that decreasing government spending, taxes, job creation, and illegal immigration were less important priorities.

Shreve's candidacy was endorsed by the Frederick County Teachers Association and the Frederick County Association of Realtors.

Shreve came in fourth place with ten percent of the vote in the Republican primary, advancing to the general election.

In the general election, Shreve won a seat on the Frederick County Board of Commissioners, coming in third place with twelve percent of the vote.

Responding to comments that the incoming Frederick County Board of Commissioners would have no women serving for the first time since 1978, Shreve said, "It would be like saying there are no Asians on the board, or no Hispanics. Everyone has their own issues, but I think in general, people are all alike."

Shreve was sworn in on December 1, 2010.

==== First term ====
The editorial board of The Frederick News-Post criticized Shreve for missing, arriving late, or leaving early for 4 out of 56 weekly Board of Education meetings. During one such meeting, Shreve left the meeting just before the vote on whether to approve the school budget. In a letter to the editor, Shreve debated the definition of the word meeting, the importance of the meetings, and whether he is legally required to attend the meetings.

As a cost-saving measure, Shreve said he would consider layoffs of ten percent or more of the county government's employees. Shreve also supported cutting funding to the county's critical farms program, which supports establishing new farms or enlarging established farms.

Shreve supported increasing the tuition at Frederick Community College.

Shreve opposed building a new library in Walkersville, saying that having a library in the Walkersville Middle School was sufficient.

When fellow Commissioner David Gray said that members of the Board of Commissioners should not treat it as a part-time position, Shreve disagreed. Shreve said he works between ten and twenty hours per week as a Commissioner. Shreve stated Commissioners should leave most aspects of governing to government employees, saying, "You don't add anything to the equation most of the time. Most of the time you just screw things up."

=== Frederick County Council ===
==== 2014 campaign ====
In 2014, Shreve ran as a Republican candidate for one of the two at-large positions on the first elected council of Frederick County. Shreve was one of thirteen candidates for the two at-large seats.

Shreve said that overcrowding was not a problem in county schools. Shreve said that he would prefer to have classes taught in trailers on school grounds rather than build more schools.

On the subject of teenagers who abuse prescription drugs, Shreve said the solution was to increase education.

Shreve and Bud Otis won the Republican primary election, advancing to the general election. Shreve received 24 percent of the vote.

In the general election, Shreve won an at-large seat on the Council with 25 percent of the total vote. Shreve was sworn in on December 1, 2014.

==== First term ====
Two weeks prior to the swearing-in ceremony, there was an orientation for future Frederick County Council members, where ethics rules, office setup, and communication were discussed. Shreve did not attend. The Maryland Association of Counties also held an orientation for newly elected officials, which Shreve did not attend.

Shreve abstained from virtually all budget-related votes, saying he would continue to do so until he has a larger staff that can advise him. Shreve abstained from over sixty such votes in 2015. When County Executive Jan Gardner invited each council member to meet with her to discuss the proposed budget, Shreve declined the offer. Shreve has also complained that he was not assigned a parking spot at the county's government building and that it took too long to get a key to his office.

Shreve opposed a proposal to increase the county's hotel tax from three percent to five percent, some of which would fund construction and improvements to conference halls and exhibit halls in the county. Shreve also opposed a bill to fund part of the construction of a hotel and conference center in downtown Frederick.

Shreve supported selling a county-owned nursing home, Citizens Care and Rehabilitation Center and Montevue Assisted Living, to a private company.

On a bill to make it easier for the Frederick County Sheriff's Office to enforce noise violations, Shreve voted against. Shreve said he opposed making it unlawful to operate an off-road vehicle within 300 feet of an adjoining property.

Shreve proposed cutting the county's budget for snow removal by $1.2 million. His proposal did not pass the council.

On a bill to make it unlawful to tamper with a fire hydrant, subject to a fine of up to $1,000, Shreve voted against the bill.

Shreve voted against a bill to increase identification of human-trafficking victims and create a provider network for comprehensive services to victims of human trafficking.

The Church of Scientology requested historical designation for Trout Run in order to use it as a Narconon rehabilitation center for drug addicts. Shreve was the only member of the council to vote in favor, saying that he was afraid the council would be sued if they did not approve it.

In 2016, Shreve organized a film contest for K–12 students aimed to create awareness against the use of drugs.

=== Maryland Senate ===
==== 2018 campaign ====
In 2018, Shreve ran to represent District 3 in the Maryland Senate. In the Republican primary election, Shreve came in second place with 24 percent of the vote.

== Electoral history ==
=== 2006 ===
2006 Republican Party Primary Election, Frederick County Board of Commissioners
Party	Candidate	Votes	%
Republican	Mike Cady	7,458	11
Republican	John R. Lovell Jr.	7,447	11
Republican	John L. Thompson Jr.	7,259	11
Republican	David P. Gray	7,000	10
Republican	Charles A. Jenkins	6,992	10
Republican	Billy Shreve	6,831	10
Republican	Joan McIntyre	6,053	9
Republican	Micky Fyock	4,085	6
Republican	Edward Lulie	4,052	6
Republican	Elaine Kessinger	3,424	5
Republican	Samie Conyers	2,674	4
Republican	Ronald S. Bird	2,249	3
Republican	Thomas C. Henderson	1,139	2
Republican	Stan Mazaleski	1,038	2

=== 2010 ===
2010 Republican Party Primary Election, Frederick County Board of Commissioners
Party	Candidate	Votes	%
Republican	Blaine Young	13,949	19
Republican	Paul Smith	8,859	12
Republican	Kirby Delauter	8,429	12
Republican	Billy Shreve	7,366	10
Republican	David Gray	5,809	8
Republican	Bob White	4,500	6
Republican	Alan Imhoff	4,367	6
Republican	Elaine Kessinger	4,301	6
Republican	Roy Taylor	3,812	5
Republican	Robert Craig	3,688	5
Republican	Dick Johnson	3,512	5
Republican	Micky Fyock	3,038	4

2010 General Election, Frederick County Board of Commissioners
Party	Candidate	Votes	%
Republican	Blaine Young	13,949	19
Republican	Paul Smith	8,859	12
Republican	Billy Shreve	36,507	12
Republican	David Gray	35,648	11
Republican	Kirby Delauter	35,536	11
Democratic	Janice Wiles	23,184	7
Democratic	Linda Norris	28,596	9
Democratic	Michael Kurtianyk	25,524	8
Democratic	Kai Hagen	29,537	9
Democratic	Ellis Burruss	23,993	8

=== 2014 ===
2014 Republican Party Primary Election, Frederick County Council
Party	Candidate	Votes	%
Republican	Billy Shreve	7,491	24
Republican	Bud Otis	6,291	20
Republican	Jennifer Charlton	5,151	17
Republican	Eric Besch	3,573	11
Republican	Justin M. Kiska	3,024	10
Republican	Dick Johnson	2,626	8
Republican	Wayne S. Creadick	2,504	8
Republican	Jonathon Pocius	454	1

2014 General Election, Frederick County Council
Party	Candidate	Votes	%
Republican	Bud Otis	39,756	27
Republican	Billy Shreve	35,879	25
Democratic	Susan Reeder Jessee	34,942	24
Democratic	Linda Marie Norris	34,214	24
	Write-in	161	0

=== 2018 ===
2018 Republican Party Primary Election, Maryland Senate, District 3
Party	Candidate	Votes	%
Republican	Craig Giangrande	4,912	76
Republican	Billy Shreve	1,521	24
