= 2012 United States House of Representatives elections in Maryland =

- November 6, 2012

All 8 Maryland seats to the United States House of Representatives
	Majority party	Minority party
Party	Democratic	Republican
Last election	6	2
Seats won	7	1
Seat change	▲1	▼1
Popular vote	1,626,872	858,406
Percentage	62.92%	33.20%
Swing	▲2.44%	▼3.74%

Democratic hold Democratic gain
Republican hold
Democratic
40–50%
50–60%
60–70%
70–80%
80–90%
Republican
40–50%
50–60%
60–70%

The 2012 United States House of Representatives elections in Maryland were held on Tuesday, November 6, 2012, to elect the eight U.S. representatives from the state of Maryland, one from each of the state's eight congressional districts. The elections coincided with the elections of other federal and state offices, including the quadrennial presidential election and an election to the U.S. Senate.

The new congressional map, drawn and passed by the Democratic-controlled Maryland General Assembly, was signed into law by Governor Martin O'Malley on October 20, 2011. The map made the 6th district, at that time represented by Republican Roscoe Bartlett, much more favorable to Democrats.

== Overview ==
United States House of Representatives elections in Maryland, 2012
Party	Votes	Percentage	+/–	Seats	+/–
Democratic	1,626,872	62.92%	+2.44%	7	+1
Republican	858,406	33.20%	-3.74%	1	-1
Libertarian	69,298	2.68%	+0.65%		-
Green	10,104	0.39%	+0.39%		-
Others	20,834	0.81%	+0.73%		-
Totals	2,585,514	100.00%	-	8	-

Popular vote
Democratic	62.92%
Republican	33.20%
Libertarian	2.68%
Green	0.39%
Others	0.81%

House seats
Democratic	87.50%
Republican	12.50%

== District 1 ==
2012 Maryland's 1st congressional district election
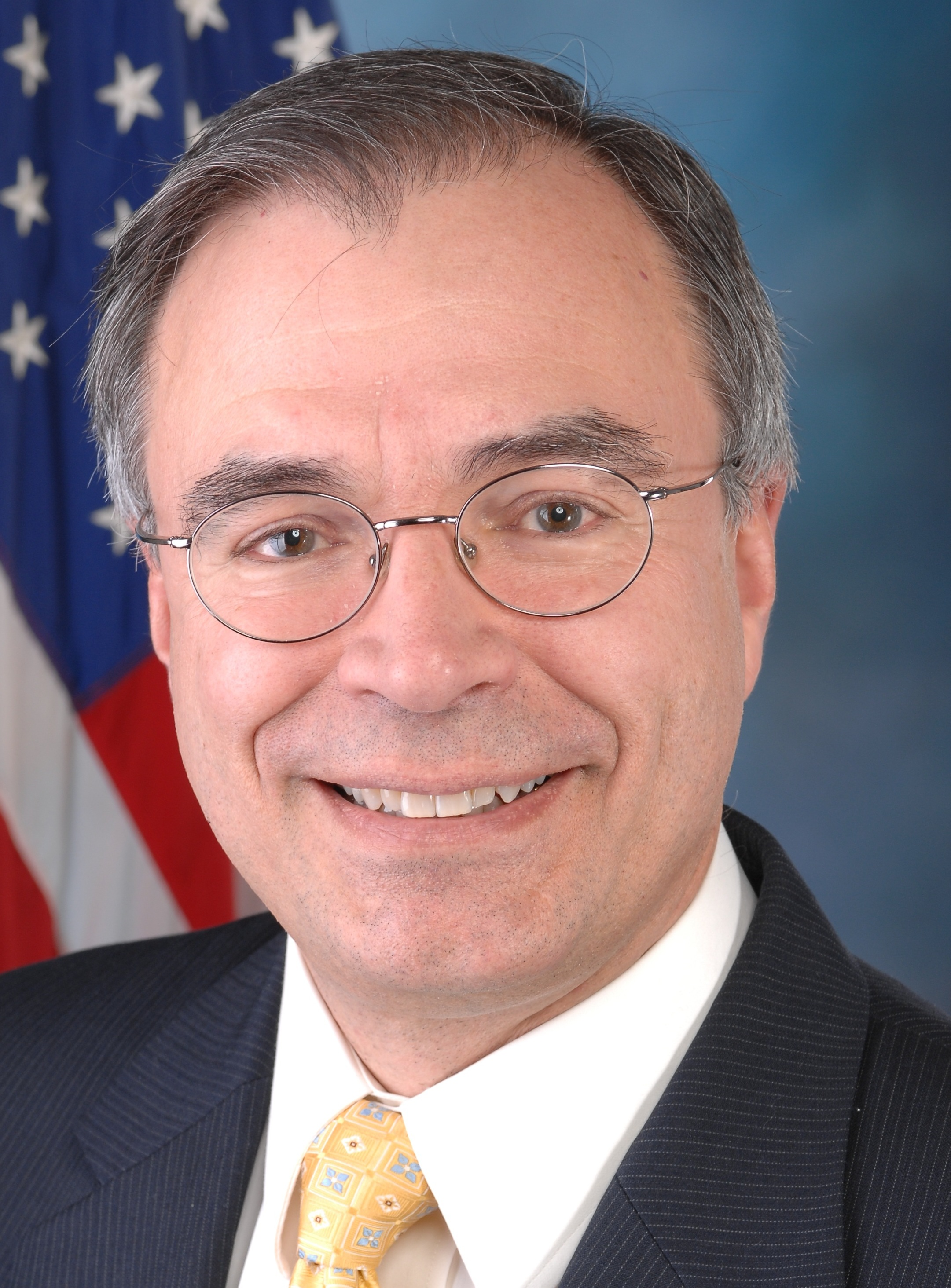

Nominee	Andy Harris	Wendy Rosen
Party	Republican	Democratic
Popular vote	214,204	92,812
Percentage	63.4%	27.5%
- County results Harris: 50–60% 60–70% 70–80%
U.S. Representative before election
Andy Harris
Republican
Elected U.S. Representative
Andy Harris
Republican

The redrawn 1st district includes Caroline, Cecil, Dorchester, Kent, Queen Anne's, Somerset, Talbot, Wicomico, and Worcester counties, as well as parts of Baltimore, Carroll, and Harford counties. Republican incumbent Andy Harris, who had been first elected in 2010, ran for re-election.

=== Republican primary ===
==== Candidates ====
===== Nominee =====
- Andy Harris, incumbent U.S. Representative

==== Primary results ====
Republican primary results
Party	Candidate	Votes	%
Republican	Andy Harris (incumbent)	44,599	100.0
Total votes		44,599	100.0

=== Democratic primary ===
==== Candidates ====
===== Nominee =====
- Wendy Rosen, businesswoman

===== Eliminated in primary =====
- John LaFerla, OB/GYN physician and former president of the Kent County Democratic Central Committee
- Kimberley Letke, businesswoman

===== Declined =====
- Frank Kratovil, former U.S. Representative

==== Primary results ====
Democratic primary results
Party	Candidate	Votes	%
Democratic	Wendy Rosen	10,907	43.1
Democratic	John LaFerla	10,850	42.8
Democratic	Kim Letke	3,564	14.1
Total votes		25,321	100.0

=== Libertarian primary ===
==== Nominee ====
- Muir Boda, asset protection manager

=== General election ===
==== Campaign ====
After Rosen won the primary, she was forced to withdraw from the race on September 10, 2012, after evidence surfaced that she had voted in both Maryland and Florida in the 2006 and 2008 elections. Rosen had property in Florida, and Maryland law allowed property owners to vote in local elections even if they live elsewhere. However, her Florida voting registration reportedly also gave her access to state and federal elections there, something which was not allowed by Maryland law. As the deadline for replacing a candidate on the general election ballot was August 28, members of the Democratic Central Committees of each county in the district had to choose a write-in candidate to run in November. Two potential candidates who indicated an interest were former U.S. Representative Wayne Gilchrest, who represented the 1st district as a Republican from 1991 to 2009, and LaFerla, who finished a close second in the primary. LaFerla was then endorsed as the Democratic write-in candidate.

==== Predictions ====
Source	Ranking	As of
The Cook Political Report	Safe R	November 5, 2012
Rothenberg	Safe R	November 2, 2012
Roll Call	Safe R	November 4, 2012
Sabato's Crystal Ball	Safe R	November 5, 2012
NY Times	Safe R	November 4, 2012
RCP	Safe R	November 4, 2012
The Hill	Safe R	November 4, 2012

==== Results ====
Maryland's 1st congressional district, 2012
Party	Candidate	Votes	%
Republican	Andy Harris (incumbent)	214,204	63.4
Democratic	Wendy Rosen	92,812	27.5
Democratic	John LaFerla (write-in)	14,858	4.4
Libertarian	Muir Wayne Boda	12,857	3.8
n/a	Write-ins	3,029	0.9
Total votes		337,760	100.0
Republican hold			

== District 2 ==
2012 Maryland's 2nd congressional district election
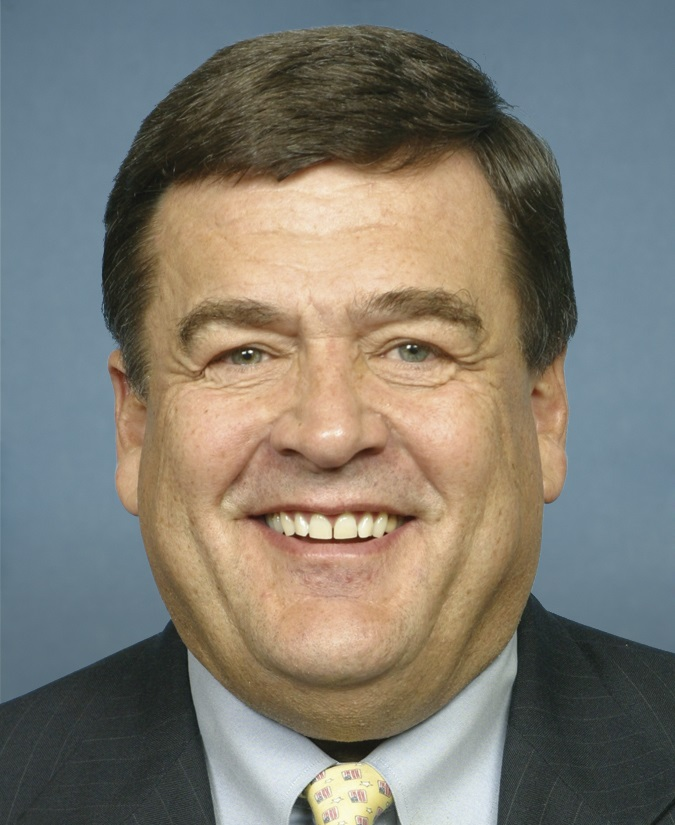

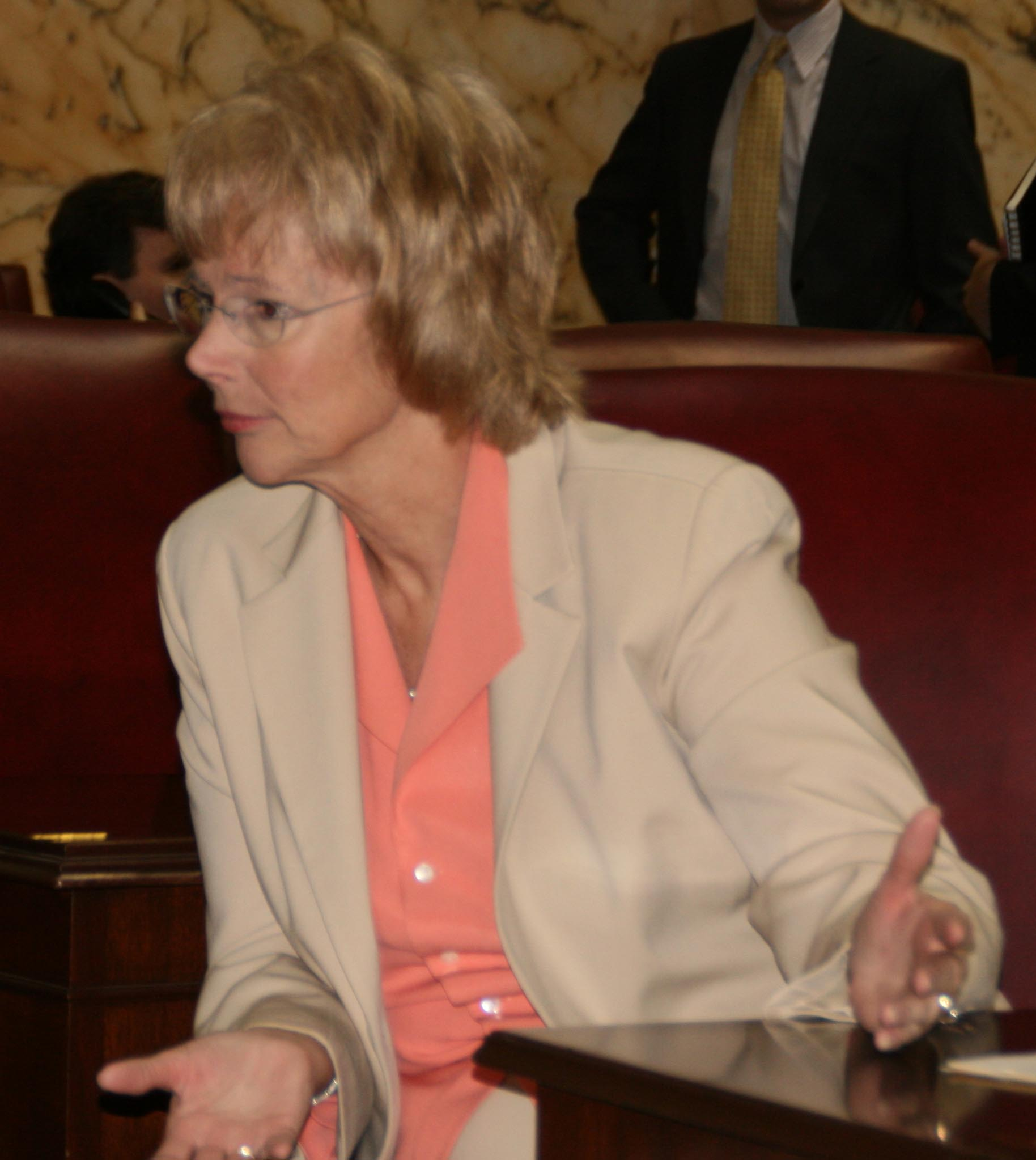
Nominee	Dutch Ruppersberger	Nancy Jacobs
Party	Democratic	Republican
Popular vote	194,088	92,071
Percentage	65.6%	31.1%
- County results Ruppersberger: 50–60% 60–70% 80–90%
U.S. Representative before election
Dutch Ruppersberger
Democratic
Elected U.S. Representative
Dutch Ruppersberger
Democratic

The redrawn 2nd district includes parts of Anne Arundel, Baltimore, Harford, and Howard counties, and parts of the city of Baltimore. Democrat Dutch Ruppersberger, who had represented the 2nd district since 2003, ran for re-election.

=== Democratic primary ===
==== Candidates ====
===== Nominee =====
- Dutch Ruppersberger, incumbent U.S. Representative

==== Primary results ====
Democratic primary results
Party	Candidate	Votes	%
Democratic	Dutch Ruppersberger (incumbent)	26,465	100.0
Total votes		26,465	100.0

=== Republican primary ===
==== Candidates ====
===== Nominee =====
- Nancy Jacobs, State Senator

===== Eliminated in primary =====
- Ray Bly, veteran
- Vladmir Degen
- Richard Impallaria, state delegate
- Howard Orton
- Larry Smith, former aide to U.S. Representative Andy Harris

===== Declined =====
- Pat McDonough, state delegate

==== Primary results ====
Republican primary results
Party	Candidate	Votes	%
Republican	Nancy Jacobs	12,372	58.9
Republican	Rick Impallaria	4,998	23.8
Republican	Larry Smith	2,392	11.4
Republican	Howard Orton	500	2.4
Republican	Ray Bly	415	2.0
Republican	Vlad Degen	324	1.5
Total votes		21,001	100.0

=== Libertarian primary ===
==== Nominee ====
- Leo Dymowski, Army veteran and attorney

=== General election ===
==== Predictions ====
Source	Ranking	As of
The Cook Political Report	Safe D	November 5, 2012
Rothenberg	Safe D	November 2, 2012
Roll Call	Safe D	November 4, 2012
Sabato's Crystal Ball	Safe D	November 5, 2012
NY Times	Safe D	November 4, 2012
RCP	Safe D	November 4, 2012
The Hill	Safe D	November 4, 2012

==== Results ====
Maryland's 2nd congressional district, 2012
Party	Candidate	Votes	%
Democratic	Dutch Ruppersberger (incumbent)	194,088	65.6
Republican	Nancy Jacobs	92,071	31.1
Libertarian	Leo Wayne Dymowski	9,344	3.2
n/a	Write-ins	437	0.1
Total votes		295,940	100.0
Democratic hold			

== District 3 ==
2012 Maryland's 3rd congressional district election
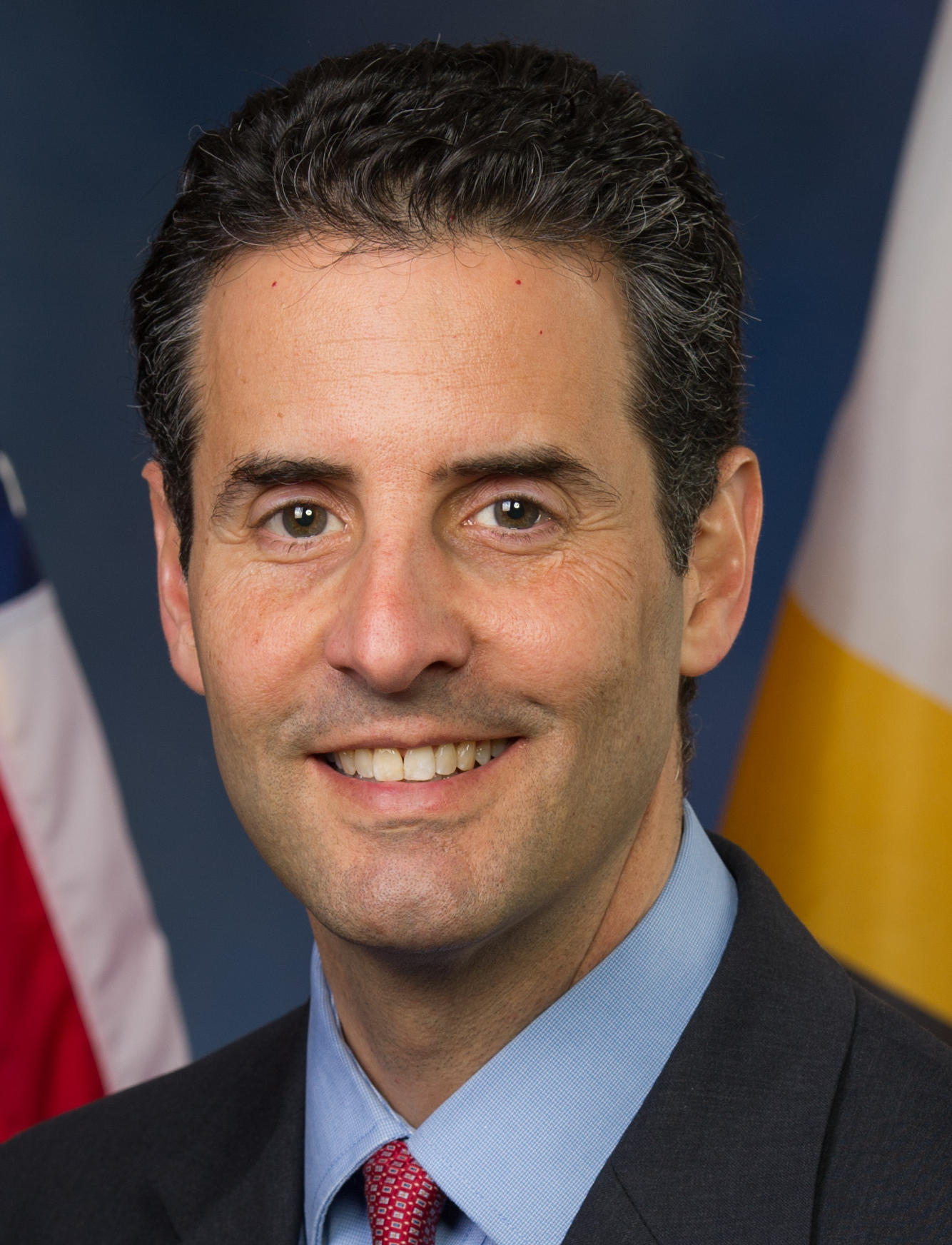

Nominee	John Sarbanes	Eric Delano Knowles
Party	Democratic	Republican
Popular vote	213,747	94,549
Percentage	66.8%	29.6%
- County results Sarbanes: 50–60% 60–70% 70–80%
U.S. Representative before election
John Sarbanes
Democratic
Elected U.S. Representative
John Sarbanes
Democratic

The redrawn 3rd district includes parts of Anne Arundel, Baltimore, Howard, and Montgomery counties, and parts of the city of Baltimore. Democrat John Sarbanes, who had represented the 3rd district since 2007, ran for re-election.

=== Democratic primary ===
==== Candidates ====
===== Nominee =====
- John Sarbanes, incumbent U.S. Representative

===== Eliminated in primary =====
- Dave Lockwood, management consultant

==== Primary results ====
Democratic primary results
Party	Candidate	Votes	%
Democratic	John Sarbanes	32,527	86.4
Democratic	Dave Lockwood	5,111	13.6
Total votes		37,638	100.0

=== Republican primary ===
==== Candidates ====
===== Nominee =====
- Eric Delano Knowles, bartender and Constitution Party nominee for governor for 2010

===== Eliminated in primary =====
- Armand Girard, retired teacher
- Thomas E. "Pinkston" Harris, nominee for this seat in 2008 and candidate for in 2010
- Draper Phelps

==== Primary results ====
Republican primary results
Party	Candidate	Votes	%
Republican	Eric Delano Knowles	6,845	33.5
Republican	Pinkston Harris	5,874	28.7
Republican	Armand Girard	4,809	23.5
Republican	Draper Phelps	2,935	14.3
Total votes		20,463	100.0

=== Libertarian primary ===
==== Candidates ====
===== Nominee =====
- Paul Drgos Jr, computer programmer

=== General election ===
==== Predictions ====
Source	Ranking	As of
The Cook Political Report	Safe D	November 5, 2012
Rothenberg	Safe D	November 2, 2012
Roll Call	Safe D	November 4, 2012
Sabato's Crystal Ball	Safe D	November 5, 2012
NY Times	Safe D	November 4, 2012
RCP	Safe D	November 4, 2012
The Hill	Safe D	November 4, 2012

==== Results ====
Maryland's 3rd congressional district, 2012
Party	Candidate	Votes	%
Democratic	John Sarbanes (incumbent)	213,747	66.8
Republican	Eric Delano Knowles	94,549	29.6
Libertarian	Paul R. Drgos, Jr.	11,028	3.4
n/a	Write-ins	535	0.2
Total votes		319,859	100.0
Democratic hold			

== District 4 ==
2012 Maryland's 4th congressional district election
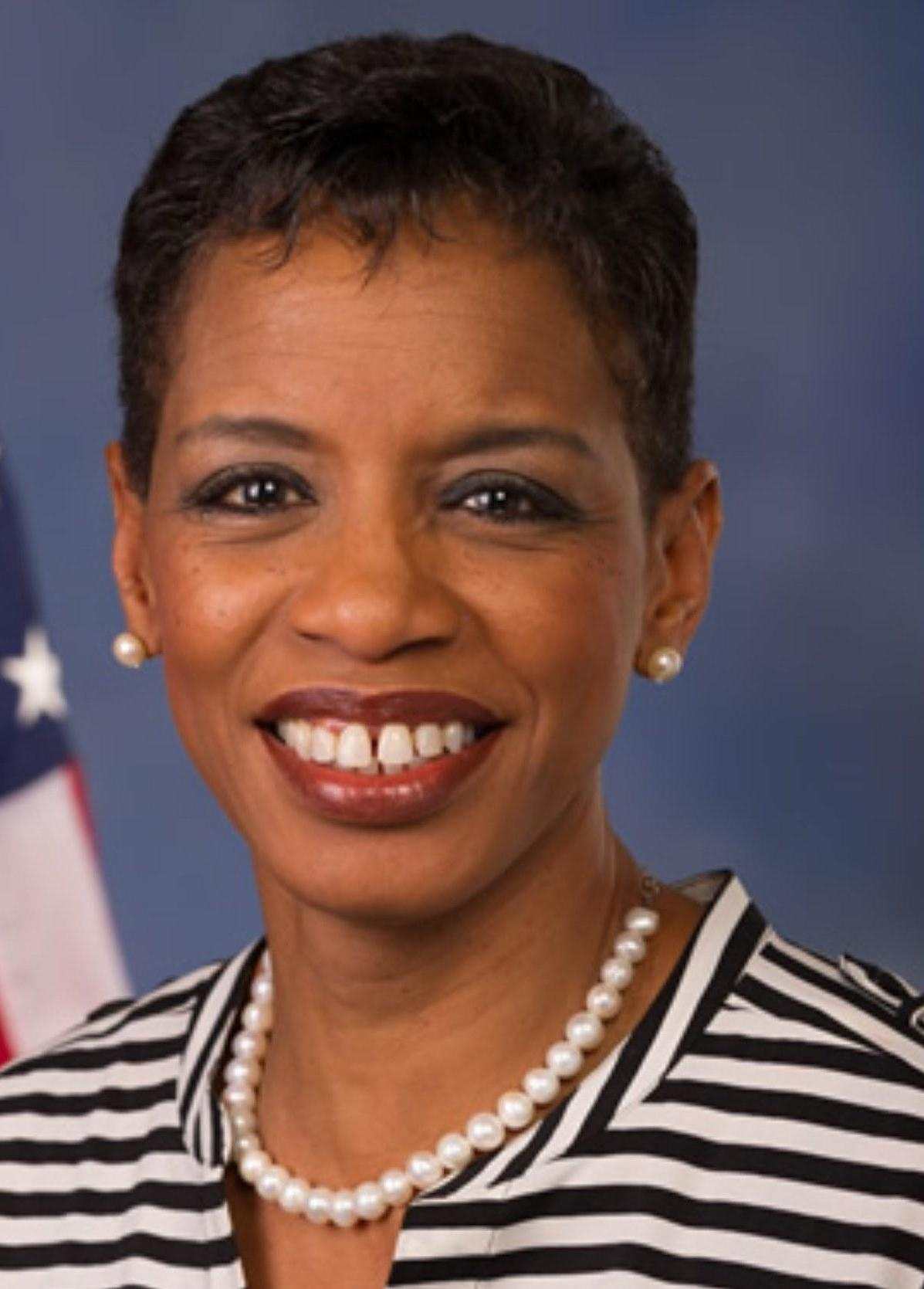

Nominee	Donna Edwards	Faith M. Loudon
Party	Democratic	Republican
Popular vote	240,385	64,560
Percentage	77.2%	20.7%
- County results Edwards: >90% Loudon: 50–60%
U.S. Representative before election
Donna Edwards
Democratic
Elected U.S. Representative
Donna Edwards
Democratic

The redrawn 4th district includes parts of Anne Arundel and Prince George's counties. Democrat Donna Edwards, who had represented the 4th district since 2008, ran for re-election.

=== Democratic primary ===
==== Candidates ====
===== Nominee =====
- Donna Edwards, incumbent U.S. Representative

===== Eliminated in primary =====
- Ian Garner, U.S. Navy veteran
- George McDermott, entrepreneur

===== Withdrawn =====
- Glenn Ivey, former Prince George's County State's Attorney

===== Declined =====
- Jaime Benoit, Anne Arundel County councilman

==== Primary results ====
Democratic primary results
Party	Candidate	Votes	%
Democratic	Donna Edwards (incumbent)	42,815	91.8
Democratic	George McDermott	2,359	5.1
Democratic	Ian Garner	1,464	3.1
Total votes		46,638	100.0

=== Republican primary ===
==== Candidates ====
===== Nominee =====
- Faith Loudon

===== Eliminated in primary =====
- Randy Gearhart
- Greg Holmes
- Charles Shepherd

==== Primary results ====
Republican primary results
Party	Candidate	Votes	%
Republican	Faith Loudon	9,175	61.3
Republican	Randy Gearhart	2,977	19.9
Republican	Charles Shepherd	1,443	9.6
Republican	Greg Holmes	1,370	9.2
Total votes		14,965	100.0

=== Libertarian primary ===
==== Candidates ====
===== Nominee =====
- Scott Soffen

=== General election ===
==== Predictions ====
Source	Ranking	As of
The Cook Political Report	Safe D	November 5, 2012
Rothenberg	Safe D	November 2, 2012
Roll Call	Safe D	November 4, 2012
Sabato's Crystal Ball	Safe D	November 5, 2012
NY Times	Safe D	November 4, 2012
RCP	Safe D	November 4, 2012
The Hill	Safe D	November 4, 2012

==== Results ====
Maryland's 4th congressional district, 2012
Party	Candidate	Votes	%
Democratic	Donna Edwards (incumbent)	240,385	77.2
Republican	Faith M. Loudon	64,560	20.7
Libertarian	Scott Soffen	6,204	2.0
n/a	Write-ins	363	0.1
Total votes		311,512	100.0
Democratic hold			

== District 5 ==
2012 Maryland's 5th congressional district election
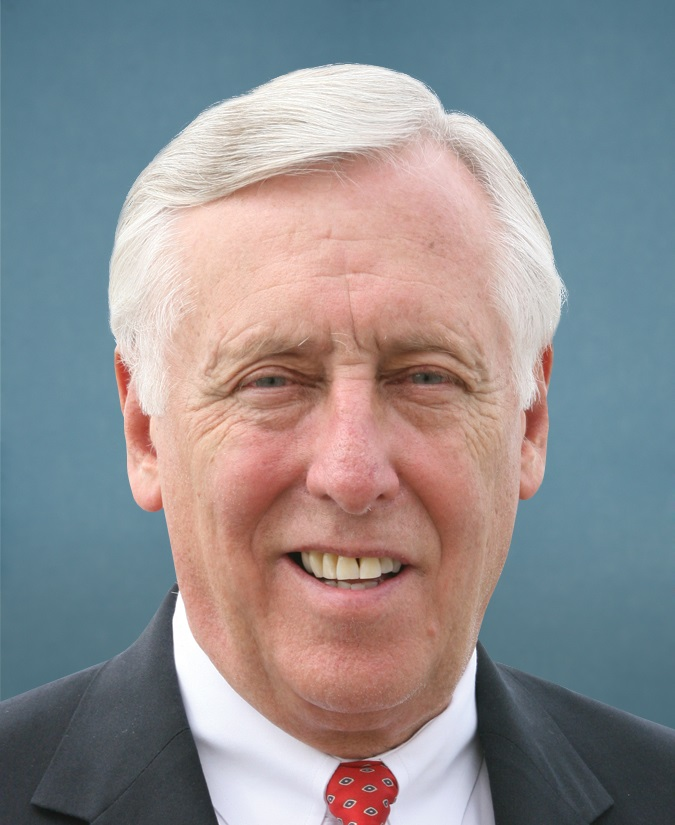

Nominee	Steny Hoyer	Tony O'Donnell
Party	Democratic	Republican
Popular vote	238,618	95,271
Percentage	69.4%	27.7%
- County results Hoyer: 40–50% 50–60% 60–70% 80–90% O'Donnell: 40–50%
U.S. Representative before election
Steny Hoyer
Democratic
Elected U.S. Representative
Steny Hoyer
Democratic

The redrawn 5th district includes Calvert, Charles, and St. Mary's counties, as well as parts of Anne Arundel and Prince George's counties. Democrat Steny Hoyer, who had represented the 5th district since 1981, ran from re-election

=== Democratic primary ===
==== Candidates ====
===== Nominee =====
- Steny Hoyer, incumbent U.S. Representative

===== Eliminated in primary =====
- Cathy Johnson Pendleton, publishing company founder

==== Primary results ====
Democratic primary results
Party	Candidate	Votes	%
Democratic	Steny Hoyer	36,961	84.7
Democratic	Cathy Johnson Pendleton	6,688	15.3
Total votes		43,649	100.0

=== Republican primary ===
==== Candidates ====
===== Nominee =====
- Tony O'Donnell, Minority Leader of the Maryland House of Delegates

===== Eliminated in primary =====
- David Hill, motorcycle technician
- Glenn Troy Morton, author

===== Declined =====
- Charles Lollar, nominee for this seat in 2010

==== Primary results ====
Republican primary results
Party	Candidate	Votes	%
Republican	Tony O'Donnell	17,329	73.7
Republican	David Hill	3,289	14.0
Republican	Glenn Morton	2,903	12.3
Total votes		23,521	100.0

=== Libertarian primary ===
==== Candidates ====
===== Nominee =====
- Arvin Vohra, aeducator and entrepreneur

=== Green primary ===
==== Candidates ====
===== Nominee =====
- Bob Auerbach

=== General election ===
Jeremy Stinson, an unaffiliated candidate, did not secure a ballot nomination and ran as a write-in candidate.

==== Predictions ====
Source	Ranking	As of
The Cook Political Report	Safe D	November 5, 2012
Rothenberg	Safe D	November 2, 2012
Roll Call	Safe D	November 4, 2012
Sabato's Crystal Ball	Safe D	November 5, 2012
NY Times	Safe D	November 4, 2012
RCP	Safe D	November 4, 2012
The Hill	Safe D	November 4, 2012

==== Results ====
Maryland's 5th congressional district, 2012
Party	Candidate	Votes	%
Democratic	Steny Hoyer (incumbent)	238,618	69.4
Republican	Tony O'Donnell	95,271	27.7
Green	Bob Auerbach	5,040	1.5
Libertarian	Arvin Vohra	4,503	1.3
n/a	Write-ins	388	0.1
Total votes		343,820	100.0
Democratic hold			

== District 6 ==
2012 Maryland's 6th congressional district election
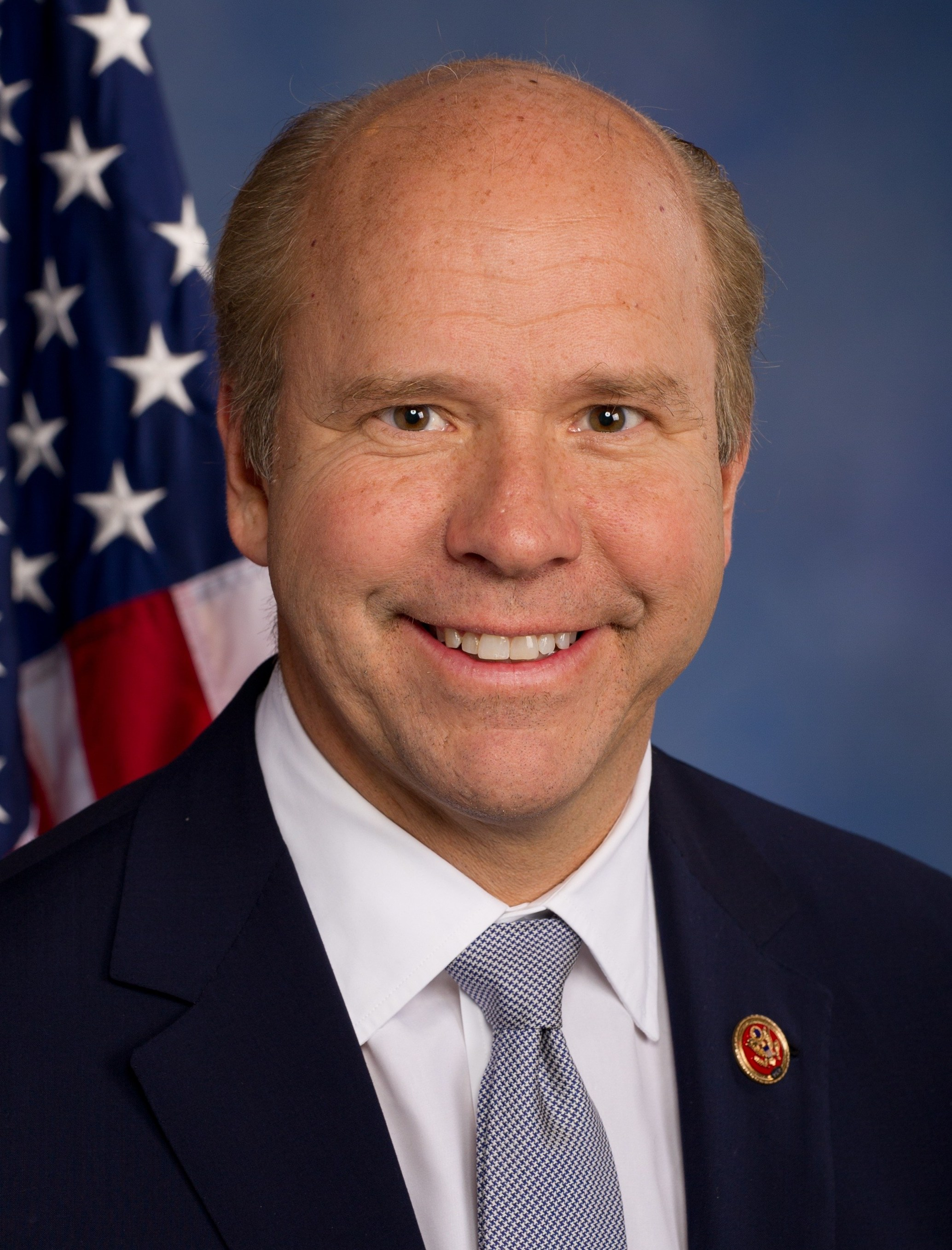

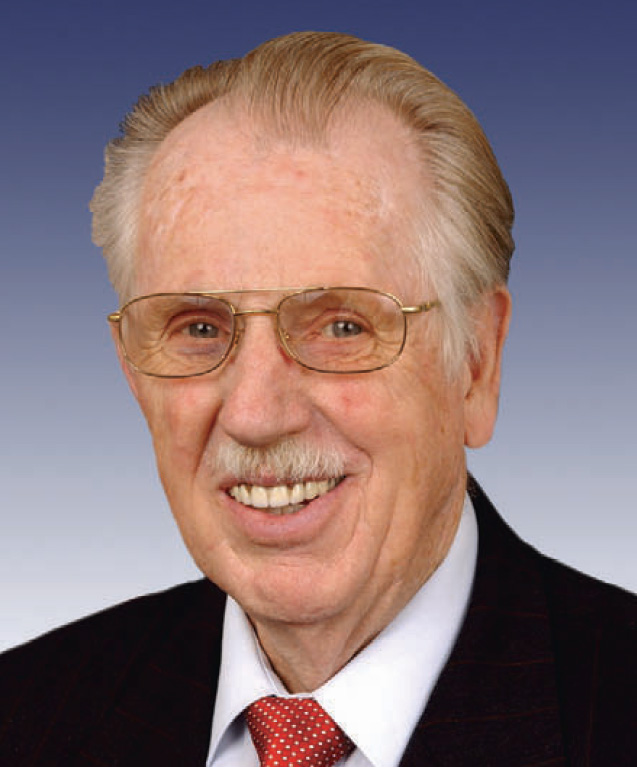
Nominee	John Delaney	Roscoe Bartlett
Party	Democratic	Republican
Popular vote	181,921	117,313
Percentage	58.8%	37.9%
- County results Delaney: 40–50% 50–60% 60–70% Bartlett: 50–60% 60–70%
U.S. Representative before election
Roscoe Bartlett
Republican
Elected U.S. Representative
John Delaney
Democratic

The redrawn 6th district includes Allegany, Garrett, and Washington counties, as well as parts of Frederick and Montgomery counties. Republican Roscoe Bartlett, who had represented the 6th district since 1993, ran for re-election.

=== Republican primary ===
==== Candidates ====
===== Nominee =====
- Roscoe Bartlett, incumbent U.S. Representative

===== Eliminated in primary =====
- Kathy Afzali, state delegate
- David R. Brinkley, state senator
- Robert Coblentz, systems analyst for the American Public University System and vice president of the Washington County Republican Club
- Robin Ficker, former state delegate and perennial candidate
- Peter James, farmer and nominee for the 4th district in 2008
- Joseph Krysztoforski, retired entrepreneur
- Brandon Rippeon, businessman

===== Declined =====
- Alex X. Mooney, chairman of the Maryland Republican Party and former state senator
- Bud Otis, Rep. Bartlett's former chief of staff
- Christopher B. Shank, state senator

==== Endorsements ====
Roscoe Bartlett

Newspapers

- The Gazette

==== Debate ====
2012 Maryland's 6th congressional district Republican primary debate
No.	Date	Host	Moderator	Link	Republican	Republican	Republican	Republican	Republican	Republican	Republican	Republican
Key: P Participant A Absent N Not invited I Invited W Withdrawn												
Key: P Participant A Absent N Not invited I Invited W Withdrawn					Kathy Afzali	Roscoe Bartlett	David R. Brinkley	Robert Coblentz	Robin Ficker	Peter James	Joseph Krysztoforski	Brandon Rippeon
1	Mar. 12, 2012	AARP Maryland; Maryland Reporter; Montgomery College Germantown	Len Lazarick	YouTube	P	P	P	P	P	P	P	P

==== Primary results ====
Republican primary results
Party	Candidate	Votes	%
Republican	Roscoe Bartlett (incumbent)	17,600	43.6
Republican	David R. Brinkley	7,987	19.8
Republican	Kathy Afzali	4,115	10.2
Republican	Joseph Krysztoforski	3,073	7.6
Republican	Robin Ficker	2,854	7.1
Republican	Brandon Rippeon	2,843	7.0
Republican	Robert Coblentz	970	2.4
Republican	Peter James	933	2.3
Total votes		40,375	100.0

=== Democratic primary ===
==== Candidates ====
===== Nominee =====
- John Delaney, commercial banker

===== Eliminated in primary =====
- Charles Bailey
- Robert J. Garagiola, state senator
- Ron Little, member of the Montgomery County Board of Social Services
- Milad Pooran, doctor and Air Force veteran

===== Withdrawn =====
- Duchy Trachtenberg, former member of the Montgomery County Council

===== Declined =====
- Doug Duncan, former Montgomery County Executive
- Mark Shriver, state delegate

==== Endorsements ====
John Delaney

Executive branch officials

- Bill Clinton, former President of the United States

U.S. Representatives

- Donna Edwards, U.S. representative from Maryland's 4th congressional district (2008–present)

State officials

- Peter Franchot, Comptroller of Maryland

Newspapers

- The Gazette
- The Washington Post

Individuals

- Dee Dee Myers, former White House Press Secretary
Rob Garagiola

U.S. Representatives

- Steny Hoyer, U.S. representative from Maryland's 5th congressional district (1981–present)

State officials

- Anthony Brown, Lieutenant Governor of Maryland (2007–present)
- Martin O’Malley, Governor of Maryland (2007–present)

==== Primary results ====
Democratic primary results
Party	Candidate	Votes	%
Democratic	John Delaney	20,414	54.2
Democratic	Rob Garagiola	10,981	29.1
Democratic	Milad Pooran	3,590	9.5
Democratic	Charles Bailey	1,572	4.2
Democratic	Ron Little	1,131	3.0
Total votes		37,688	100.0

=== Libertarian primary ===
==== Candidates ====
===== Nominee =====
- Nickolaus Mueller

=== General election ===
==== Campaign ====
Facing a district that had been significantly redrawn to favor the Democrats (going from a seat that McCain carried with 57%, Obama would have carried the redrawn seat with 56%), the Bartlett campaign faced further difficulties when the Federal Election Commission fined Bartlett $5,000 for repeatedly failing to submit accurate campaign finance disclosure reports.

When Todd Akin made his controversial comments about female biology, Bartlett immediately repudiated them, adding, "There is no room in politics for these types of statements... As a human physiologist I know there is no scientific backing to Todd's claims." He reiterated that his view on abortion exceptions has been "the same for twenty years. I'm pro-life, with exceptions for the life of the mother, rape and incest... I'm so avidly pro-life I'm against corporal punishment."

However, it was later revealed that in 2001 Bartlett had supported a constitutional amendment which did not include the rape and incest exceptions.

==== Endorsements ====
Roscoe Bartlett (R)

Organizations

- National Republican Congressional Committee "Patriot" Program
John Delaney (D)

Executive branch officials

- Bill Clinton, former President of the United States

U.S. Representatives

- Donna Edwards, U.S. representative from Maryland's 4th congressional district (2008–present)

State officials

- Peter Franchot, Comptroller of Maryland

Organizations

- Democratic Congressional Campaign Committee "Red to Blue" Program

Newspapers

- The Washington Post

==== Debates ====
- Complete video of debate, October 17, 2012

==== Polling ====
Poll source	Date(s) administered	Sample size	Margin of error	Roscoe Bartlett (R)	John Delaney (D)	Nickolaus Mueller (L)	Undecided
Baltimore Sun/OpinionWorks	October 20–25, 2012	610	± 4.0%	41%	42%	—	16%
Greenberg Quinlan Rosner Research (D-Delaney)	July 23–25, 2012	400	± 4.9%	42%	44%	6%	8%
Garin-Hart-Yang (D-Delaney)	April 9–11, 2012	402	± 5.0%	39%	48%	—	13%

==== Predictions ====
Source	Ranking	As of
The Cook Political Report	Likely D (flip)	November 5, 2012
Rothenberg	Likely D (flip)	November 2, 2012
Roll Call	Likely D (flip)	November 4, 2012
Sabato's Crystal Ball	Likely D (flip)	November 5, 2012
NY Times	Lean D (flip)	November 4, 2012
RCP	Likely D (flip)	November 4, 2012
The Hill	Lean D (flip)	November 4, 2012

==== Results ====
Maryland's 6th congressional district, 2012
Party	Candidate	Votes	%
Democratic	John Delaney	181,921	58.8
Republican	Roscoe Bartlett (incumbent)	117,313	37.9
Libertarian	Nickolaus Mueller	9,916	3.2
n/a	Write-ins	399	0.1
Total votes		309,549	100.0
Democratic gain from Republican			

== District 7 ==
2012 Maryland's 7th congressional district election
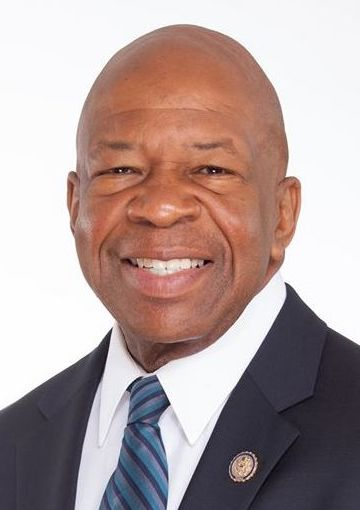

Nominee	Elijah Cummings	Frank C. Mirabile
Party	Democratic	Republican
Popular vote	247,770	67,405
Percentage	76.5%	20.8%
- County results Cummings: 50–60% 60–70% >90%
U.S. Representative before election
Elijah Cummings
Democratic
Elected U.S. Representative
Elijah Cummings
Democratic

The redrawn 7th district includes parts of Baltimore and Howard counties, and parts of the city of Baltimore. Democrat Elijah Cummings, who had represented the 7th district since 1996, ran for re-election.

=== Democratic primary ===
==== Candidates ====
===== Nominee =====
- Elijah Cummings, incumbent U.S. Representative

===== Eliminated in primary =====
- Ty Busch
- Charles Smith

==== Primary results ====
Democratic primary results
Party	Candidate	Votes	%
Democratic	Elijah Cummings	49,625	92.8
Democratic	Charles Smith	2,438	4.6
Democratic	Ty Busch	1,396	2.6
Total votes		53,459	100.0

=== Republican primary ===
==== Candidates ====
===== Nominee =====
- Frank Mirabile

===== Eliminated in primary =====
- Justin Kinsey

==== Primary results ====
Republican primary results
Party	Candidate	Votes	%
Republican	Frank Mirabile	10,849	69.8
Republican	Justin Kinsey	4,695	30.2
Total votes		15,544	100.0

=== Libertarian primary ===
==== Candidates ====
===== Nominee =====
- Ronald Owens-Bey

=== General election ===
==== Predictions ====
Source	Ranking	As of
The Cook Political Report	Safe D	November 5, 2012
Rothenberg	Safe D	November 2, 2012
Roll Call	Safe D	November 4, 2012
Sabato's Crystal Ball	Safe D	November 5, 2012
NY Times	Safe D	November 4, 2012
RCP	Safe D	November 4, 2012
The Hill	Safe D	November 4, 2012

==== Results ====
Maryland's 7th congressional district, 2012
Party	Candidate	Votes	%
Democratic	Elijah Cummings (incumbent)	247,770	76.5
Republican	Frank C. Mirabile	67,405	20.8
Libertarian	Ronald M. Owens-Bey	8,211	2.5
n/a	Write-ins	432	0.1
Total votes		323,818	100.0
Democratic hold			

== District 8 ==
2012 Maryland's 8th congressional district election
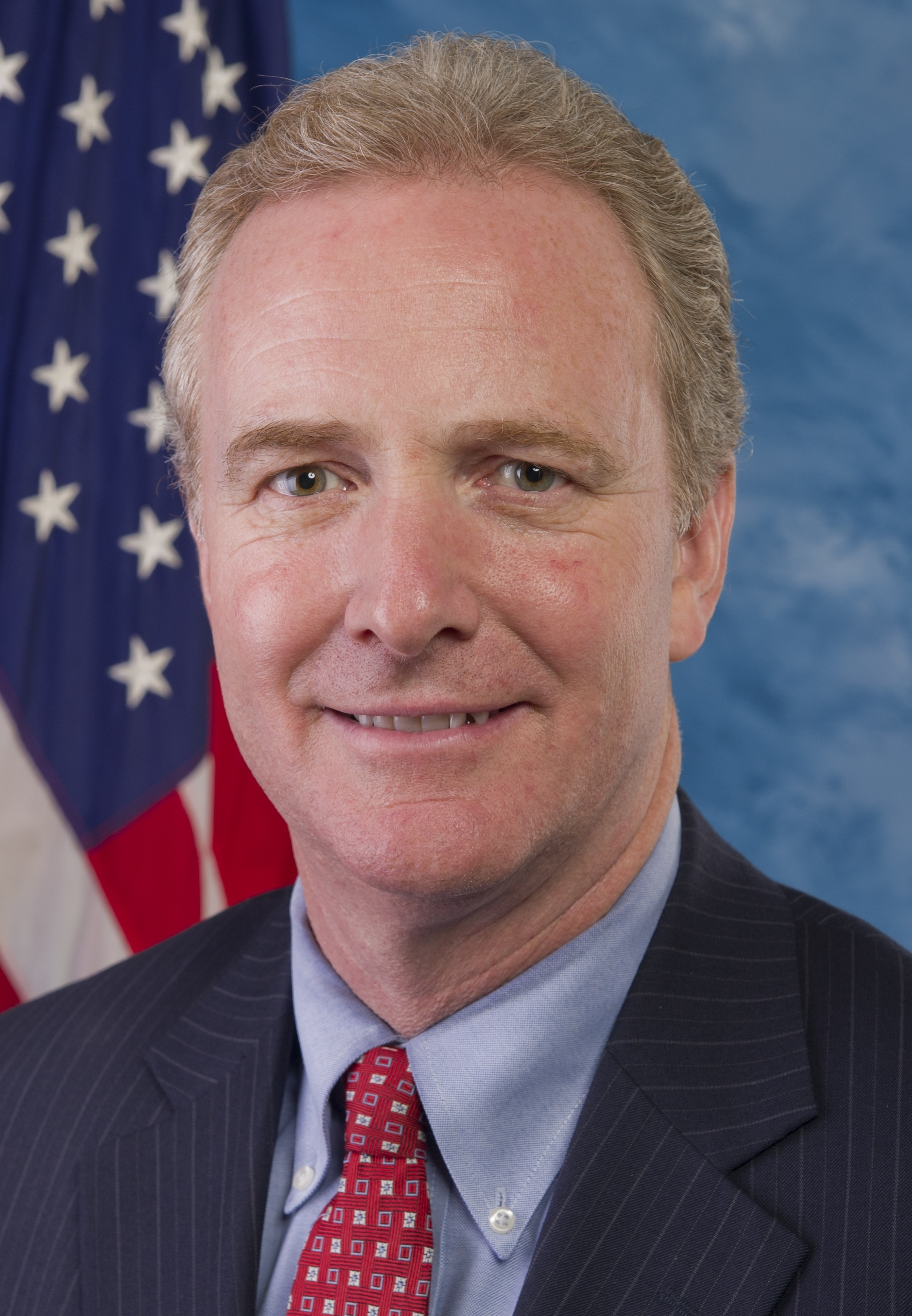

Nominee	Chris Van Hollen	Kenneth Timmerman
Party	Democratic	Republican
Popular vote	217,531	113,033
Percentage	63.4%	32.9%
- County results Van Hollen: 70–80% Timmerman: 50–60% 60–70%
U.S. Representative before election
Chris Van Hollen
Democratic
Elected U.S. Representative
Chris Van Hollen
Democratic

The redrawn 8th district will include parts of Carroll, Frederick, and Montgomery counties. Democrat Chris Van Hollen, who had represented the 8th district since 2003, ran for re-election.

=== Democratic primary ===
==== Candidates ====
===== Nominee =====
- Chris Van Hollen, incumbent

===== Eliminated in primary =====
- George English, retired economist

==== Primary results ====
Democratic primary results
Party	Candidate	Votes	%
Democratic	Chris Van Hollen (incumbent)	35,989	92.2
Democratic	George English	3,041	7.8
Total votes		39,030	100.0

=== Republican primary ===
==== Candidates ====
===== Nominee =====
- Kenneth Timmerman, author and reporter

===== Eliminated in primary =====
- Gus Alzona, accountant
- Shelly Skolnick, attorney
- Dave Wallace, businessman

==== Primary results ====
Republican primary results
Party	Candidate	Votes	%
Republican	Ken Timmerman	13,340	46.2
Republican	Dave Wallace	9,319	32.3
Republican	Shelly Skolnick	3,671	12.7
Republican	Gus Alzona	2,542	8.8
Total votes		28,872	100.0

=== Libertarian primary ===
==== Candidates ====
===== Nominee =====
- Mark Grannis, attorney

=== Green primary ===
==== Candidates ====
===== Nominee =====
- George Gluck, computer consultant

=== General election ===
==== Predictions ====
Source	Ranking	As of
The Cook Political Report	Safe D	November 5, 2012
Rothenberg	Safe D	November 2, 2012
Roll Call	Safe D	November 4, 2012
Sabato's Crystal Ball	Safe D	November 5, 2012
NY Times	Safe D	November 4, 2012
RCP	Safe D	November 4, 2012
The Hill	Safe D	November 4, 2012

==== Results ====
Maryland's 8th congressional district, 2012
Party	Candidate	Votes	%
Democratic	Chris Van Hollen (incumbent)	217,531	63.4
Republican	Kenneth Timmerman	113,033	32.9
Libertarian	Mark Grannis	7,235	2.1
Green	George Gluck	5,064	1.5
n/a	Write-ins	393	0.1
Total votes		343,256	100.0
Democratic hold			

Official campaign websites
- District 1
  - Andy Harris campaign website
  - John LaFerla campaign website
  - Kim Letke campaign website
  - Wendy Rosen campaign website
  - Muir Boda campaign website
- District 2
  - Nancy Jacobs campaign website
  - Dutch Ruppersberger campaign website
  - Larry Smith campaign website
  - Leo Dymowski campaign website
- District 3
  - Armand Girard campaign website
  - Dave Lockwood campaign website
  - John Sarbanes campaign website
  - Paul Drgos campaign website
- District 4
  - Donna Edwards campaign website
  - Ian Garner campaign website
  - Faith Loudon campaign website
- District 5
  - David Hill campaign website
  - Steny Hoyer campaign website
  - Glenn Morton campaign website
  - Anthony O'Donnell campaign website
  - Cathy Johnson Pendleton campaign website
  - Arvin Vohra campaign website
- District 6
  - Kathy Afzali campaign website
  - Charles Bailey campaign website
  - Roscoe Bartlett campaign website
  - David Brinkley campaign website
  - Robert Coblentz campaign website
  - John Delaney campaign website
  - Robert Garagiola campaign website
  - Joseph Krysztoforski campaign website
  - Ron Little campaign website
  - Milad Pooran campaign website
  - Brandon Rippeon campaign website
- District 7
  - Elijah Cummings campaign website
- District 8
  - Gus Alzona campaign website
  - George Gluck campaign website
  - Ken Timmerman campaign website
  - Chris Van Hollen campaign website
  - Dave Wallace campaign website
  - Mark Grannis campaign website
