= Limbert =

Limbert is both a surname and a given name. Notable people with the surname include:

Surname:

- Charles Limbert designer and founder of the Limbert Furniture Company.
- John Limbert, American diplomat
- Marc Limbert (born 1973), Welsh football midfielder
- Paul Moyer Limbert (1897–1998), American Secretary General of the World Alliance of YMCA

Given name:

- Limbert Méndez (born 1982), Bolivian football defender
- Límbert Pizarro (born 1976), Bolivian football midfielder
