= Parrillo =

Parrillo is an Italian surname. Notable people with the surname include:

- Benjamin John Parrillo, American actor, writer and director
- Lucio Parrillo (born 1974), Italian artist
- Robert J. Parrillo (born 1941), American businessman and lawyer
- Vincent N. Parrillo (born 1938), American sociologist

== See also ==
- Jason Parillo (born 1974), American Mixed Martial Arts (MMA) coach
