= Safeway Insurance Group =

- Company type: Private
- Industry: Financial services
- Founded: 1959
- Headquarters: Westmont, Illinois, United States
- Area served: Alabama; Arizona; Arkansas; California; Colorado; Georgia; Illinois; Louisiana; Mississippi; New Mexico; Tennessee; Texas
- Key people: Donna Jonynas (CEO); William J. Parrillo (Founder); Chris Hidalgo (President)
- Products: Auto Insurance.
- Revenue: $420 Million (2015)
- Number of employees: 483 (2015)
- Website: www.safewayInsurance.com

Safeway Insurance Group is a privately held insurance company, providing primarily automobile insurance.

== History ==
Safeway Insurance was founded in 1959 by the Parrillo family. The family is an historic private investor in the Chicago Sun-Times.

== Description ==
Safeway Insurance is currently headquartered in Westmont, Illinois in the United States.

Safeway Insurance Group is the largest, privately held, family owned insurance company in the United States. In addition to its headquarters, Safeway maintains field offices in some of the states it conducts business in.

Safeway currently conducts business in Alabama, Arizona, Arkansas, California, Colorado, Georgia, Illinois, Louisiana, Mississippi, New Mexico, Tennessee, Texas and Utah.

Subsidiaries:

- Safeway Insurance Company
- Safeway Direct Insurance Company
- Safeway Insurance Company of Alabama
- Safeway Insurance Company of Arkansas
- Safeway Insurance Company of Georgia
- Safeway Insurance Company of Louisiana
- Safeway Financial Holding Company

== Governance ==
Robert J. Parrillo, William's brother, is a key shareholder.
