= Harry Huge =

American lawyer (1937–2020)

Harry Huge (September 16, 1937 – April 27, 2020) was an American practicing attorney, philanthropist, and venture capitalist with offices in Charleston, South Carolina.

Huge was the plaintiff's attorney in the case of Blankenship v. Boyle, a ruling which enabled a more democratic process in selection of mine union leadership. Thereafter, in 1972, Huge was appointed as a trustee of the union's pension fund by new UMWA leader Arnold Miller. Huge was chairman of the United Mine Workers Health and Retirement Fund, which provided health and pension benefits to more than a million coal miners and their families.

During the coal strike of 1968, the Daily Diary of President Jimmy Carter indicates that, on the evening of February 24, 1978, after meetings to discuss the coal strike, the President spoke first with Edgar Speer, chairman of the board of directors of U.S. Steel Corporation, then with Harry Huge, counsel to the UMW, and then went to the press room and issued a statement on the tentative settlement of the coal strike.

Huge served as a Trustee regarding several asbestos settlement trusts, including the Shook & Fletcher Asbestos Settlement Trust, Armstrong World Industries Asbestos Personal Injury Settlement Trust, and the Owens-Corning/Fibreboard Asbestos Personal Injury Trust.

Huge also was appointed as Special Master for the U.S. District Court for the District of Columbia in a case involving the crash of a U.S. Air Force plane in Vietnam that was carrying Vietnamese orphans to the United States at the end of the Vietnam war.

Huge was co-counsel representing some 4,000 family members of the victims of the September 11, 2001 attacks in the United States District Court for the Southern District of New York. In late 2002, he was appointed co-prosecutor with the Chief German Federal Prosecutor by the German Federal Criminal Court in the trials of Hamburg cell terrorists. In other capacities, he served from 1977 to 1981 as a member of the President's General Advisory Committee on Arms Control and Strategic Weapons.

Huge had co-authored articles in the New Republic, with Robert Coles, including: "Strom Thurmond Country: The Way It Is in South Carolina," (November 30, 1968); "FBI on the Trail of the Hunger-Mongers," (December 21, 1968); "Black Lung: Mining As a Way of Death," (January 25, 1969); "Thorns on the Yellow Rose of Texas," April 19, 1969; "Peonage in Florida," (October 19, 1969). Also, "In Jamie Whitten's Back Yard," (New South, Spring 1969).

Letters from Harry Huge to Robert Coles can be found in the Robert Coles papers (Collection No. 4333) at the University Library of the University of North Carolina at Chapel Hill.

Harry Huge had represented Eric Olson, with regard to claims that the CIA murdered Olson's father, scientist Frank Olson. CIA; What Did the C.I.A. Do to His Father?, Ignatieff, M. (New York Times, April 1, 2001).

Three books have been written about Harry Huge's trial work. Huge was also recently awarded the Fourth Class Order of the Cross of Terra Mariana from Estonia for his work on behalf of that nation's drive toward independence.

Huge was a graduate of Nebraska Wesleyan University where he was a member of Phi Kappa Tau fraternity and of the Georgetown Law School. In 2017, Harry and Reba Huge were awarded honorary degrees from the College of Charleston for their significant contributions to the College.

During the 2007–08 presidential campaign, Huge made contributions first to John Edwards (Q1/2007), then to Hillary Clinton(Q4/2007), then to John McCain(Q3/2008).

In 2017, Harry Huge established Change Ventures, a new venture capital fund that backs Baltic founders (excluding Russia).

Huge died on April 27, 2020, at the age of 82.
