= Walbrook D. Swank =

Walbrook D. Swank Walbrook "Wally" Davis Swank (November 20, 1910 - May 4, 2008) was a World War II officer and a noted historical author.

Walbrook Swank was born in Harrisonburg, Virginia. He was a graduate of Ohio State University and a life member of the OSU Alumni Association, and a member of the Phi Kappa Tau fraternity.

== World War II service ==
Col. Swank received numerous awards for meritorious and outstanding service with the United States Air Force during World War II and the Korean War, and a Distinguished Service Citation from the Secretary of the Treasury.

== Postwar activities ==
After the war, Colonel Swank served on the War Department Personnel Research Council and as a member of the board of directors for the Army and Air Force Civilian Welfare Fund for 19 years. Col. Swank "...was a member of the Federal Personnel Councils of Cincinnati, Ohio, Chicago, Illinois, San Francisco, Calif., and Anchorage, Alaska." Colonel Swank was the personnel officer on the staffs of the commanding generals of the Air Materiel Command and Seventeenth Air Force Service Command, Pacific Overseas Air Technical Service Command and the Alaskan Air Command.

== Author ==
Col. Swank was an author of numerous Civil War stories and authored 17 books, several of them relating to historical events, activities and people of Louisa County, Virginia. Colonel Swank also wrote about Abraham Lincoln's sense of humor, and incidents concerning Ulysses S. Grant. He also produced four books on the history of World War II.

== Organizations ==
- Military Officers Association of America
- Military Order of Foreign Wars
- Military Order of the Stars and Bars
- Sons of Confederate Veterans. Col. Swank was the founder and first commander of the Trevilian Station Camp.
- World War II Memorial Society and founding member
- American Air Museum in Britain
- Society of Civil War Historians
- Col. Swank was a past president of the Worthington, Ohio Kiwanis Club and a former member of the Columbus, Ohio Junior Chamber of Commerce.
- Thomas Jefferson Chapter, Virginia Society of the Sons of the American Revolution

Colonel Swank died on May 6, 2008, and is interred at Bethphage Christian Church, Frederick's Hall, Virginia.

The "Colonel Walbrook D. Swank Collection" of the Louisa County Public Library is named in his honor.

== Awards ==
- Distinguished Service Citation
- United Daughters of the Confederacy Jefferson Davis Medal
- United Daughters of the Confederacy Cross of Military Service
- Letters of Commendation from the Senate of the Commonwealth of Virginia for his contributions to the heritage and culture of the American South.
- Military Order of the Stars and Bars, Sir Moses Ezekiel Award for Achievement in literature
- Military Order of the Stars and Bars Henry Timrod Southern Culture Award
- Sons of Confederate Veterans Bonnie Blue Society

== Bibliography of published works ==
- Bates, Frank W., and Walbrook D. Swank. Pacific Odyssey: History of the USS Steele During WWII. Shippensburg, PA, US: Burd Street Press, 1998.
- Swank, Walbrook D. Clash of Sabres: Blue and Gray. Columbia, Ohio: Avonelle Associates, 1981.
- Swank, Walbrook D. Eyewitness to War, 1861–1865. [Mineral, Va.]: W.D. Swank, 1990.
- Gill, John, and Walbrook D. Swank. Courier for Lee and Jackson: 1861-1865 Memoirs. Shippensburg, PA: Burd Street Press, 1993.
- Carter, William R., and Walbrook D. Swank. Sabres, Saddles, and Spurs. Shippensburg, PA: Burd Street Press, 1998.
- Swank, Walbrook D. Clash of the Sabres: Blue and Gray. Raleigh, N.C.: Pentland Press, 1996.
- Swank, Walbrook D. The War & Louisa County, 1861–1865. Mineral, Va. (Route 2, Box 433, Mineral 23117): W.D. Swank, 1986.
- Cave, Robert Catlett, and Walbrook D. Swank. Raw Pork and Hardtack: A Civil War Memoir from Manassas to Appomattox. Shippensburg, PA: Burd Street Press, 1996.
- Peyton, John William, and Walbrook D. Swank. Eyewitness to War in Virginia, 1861-1865: The Civil War Diary of John William Peyton. Shippensburg, Pa: Burd Street Press, 2003.
- Peyton, George Quintus, and Walbrook D. Swank. Stonewall Jackson's Foot Cavalry: Company A, 13th Virginia Infantry. Shippensburg, Pa: Burd Street Press, 2001.
- Swank, Walbrook D. Jokes, Laughter, Humor and Funny Stories. Mineral, VA: Walbrook D. Swank, 2006.
- Cave, Robert Catlett, and Walbrook D. Swank. Defending the Southern Confederacy: The Men in Gray. Shippensburg, Pa: Burd Street Press, 2001.
- Anderson, Carter S., and Walbrook D. Swank. Train Running for the Confederacy, 1861–1865. Mineral, Va. (Box 433, Mineral 23117): W.D. Swank, 1990.
- Swank, Walbrook D. Confederate War Stories, 1861-1865: Vignettes, Anecdotes, Tales, Memoirs. Shippensburg, PA: Burd Street Press, 1991.
- Swank, Walbrook D. Battle of Trevilian Station: The Civil War's Greatest and Bloodiest All Cavalry Battle, with Eyewitness Memoirs. Shippensburg, PA, US: W.D. Swank, 1994.
- Swank, Walbrook D. Confederate Letters and Diaries, 1861–1865. Mineral, Va. (Rt. 2, Box 433, Mineral 23117): W.D. Swank, 1988.
- Swank, Walbrook D. Civil War Stories: Letters, Memoirs, Anecdotes : Union and Confederate. Shippensburg, PA, US: Burd Street Press, 1996.
- Swank, Walbrook D. A Treasury of Confederate Heritage: A Panorama of Life in the South. Shippensburg, Pa: Burd Street Press, 2003.
- Swank, Walbrook D. My WWII Diary and the War Effort with War News Day by Day. Shippensburg, PA, US: Burd Street Press, 1996.
- Swank, Walbrook D. Inside the Barracks: World War II Humor. Shippensburg, PA: Burd Street Press, 2000.
- Swank, Walbrook D. Ballads of the North and South in the Civil War. Shippensburg, PA: Burd Street Press, 1996.
- Swank, Walbrook D. Old Abe's Jokes: Humorous Stories Told of and by Abraham Lincoln. Shippensburg, PA: Burd Street Press, 1996.
- Swank, Walbrook D. Grant Captured!: Lt. Gen. Ulysses S. Grant, Commander in Chief, Armies of the United States, a Prisoner of War. Shippensburg, PA: White Mane Pub. Co, 2007.
