= E. Garrett Bewkes IV =

American publisher

Garrett Bewkes
- Born: Eugene Garrett Bewkes IV
- Education: Colgate University (BA); American University (GrDip)
- Occupation(s): Publisher, columnist
- Known for: National Review

Eugene Garrett Bewkes IV is an American businessman in the media industry, and currently is Publisher of National Review. Bewkes formerly worked for the New York Post, Grooveshark, and Turning Broadcasting Systems.

== Life and education ==
Bewkes attended Eaglebrook School and Deerfield Academy in Deerfield, Massachusetts like other members of his family. His uncle is media executive Jeff Bewkes. He graduated from Colgate University in Hamilton, New York with a degree in Peace and Conflict Studies. He also attended and completed a graduate certificate program in Applied Politics from American University.

Bewkes lives and remains active in Connecticut politics with his husband, Brad. The two of them together Co-Founded and Co-Preside over the Connecticut Chapter of Log Cabin Republicans, an organization that advocates that diversity and inclusion in the Republican Party is important and a winning strategy. Bewkes also served as Connecticut's 27th District Representative to the GOP's State Central Committee until 2021, as well as was an inaugural class graduate of the Charter Oak Leadership Program.

== National Review ==
Bewkes joined National Review in 2016 in the role of Publisher, a business strategy and management-centric position, with the mission of expanding the publication's reach. Two of his first projects were the reformatting and rebuilding of the publication's website with an eye towards accessibility, and the founding of "NRPlus", an exclusive paid-for community.

In 2019, Bewkes was named to Ad Age's annual "40 under 40" list for his work at the publication. In 2020, Bewkes was given a similar recognition when Editor & Publisher Magazine named him to their list of "25 Under 35" list of young professionals, and again in 2021 given a similar accolade by Maverick PAC in their annual Future 40 honoree series.

In 2022, Bewkes and National Review briefly came under attack from far-right publications for his leadership of the longtime conservative publication due to his being gay and married Despite their concerns, National Review was publishing criticism of pro-LGBT legislation while Bewkes was seemingly advocating for it in his personal and political life.
