= Rick Villarreal =

American athletic director

Rick Villarreal is the former CEO of the NIL and former athletic director at the University of North Texas in Denton, Texas.

He resigned in 2016 after 16 years at the University of North Texas. He was formerly a football coach at Southern Miss, LSU, and TCU. As well as the Associate Athletic Director at Southern Miss.

Rick is married to his wife D’Lynn Villarreal and has 3 kids, Justin Villarreal, Kimberly Thaggard, and Richard(Tony) Villarreal Jr..
