= Bud Otis =

American publisher and politician (1938–2025)

Frederick County Councilmember, at-large
- In office December 1, 2014 – December 1, 2018
- Preceded by: Office created

Personal details
- Born: Harold F. Otis; September 13, 1938 Indiana, U.S.
- Died: June 28, 2025 (aged 86)
- Party: Unaffiliated _{(2016–present)} Republican_{(until 2016)}
- Education: Andrews University
- Website: www.budotis.com

Harold F. "Bud" Otis (September 13, 1938 – June 28, 2025) was an American Elder of the Seventh-day Adventist Church and an American publisher and politician.

== Early years ==
Otis attended Andrews University where he earned a bachelor's degree in business administration in 1965.

== Professional career ==
Otis was president of the Review and Herald Publishing Association from 1978 to 1988. In 1981, when Otis moved the company to new, $14 million facility in Hagerstown, Maryland, the publishing house had 350 employees and an annual payroll of $6.7 million.

From 1989 to 1990, Otis served as assistant to the president of the General Conference of Seventh-day Adventists. Based in Silver Spring, Maryland, the General Conference is the governing organization of the worldwide Seventh-day Adventist Church.

Otis was president of Family Enrichment Resources from 1991 to 1997.

Otis served as chair of the Board of Directors of the Maj. Gen. Boyd C. Cook Foundation from 2012 to 2013.

Otis died on June 28, 2025, at the age of 86.

== Political career ==
Otis was the campaign chair for Ruthann Aron's campaign for U.S. Senate in 1994.

Otis joined U.S. Representative Roscoe G. Bartlett's staff in 2001, and he served as his chief of staff beginning in 2003. Bartlett considered not running for reelection in 2012, and Otis resigned from Bartlett's staff in December 2011 when the fact that he was actively lining up support to run for his boss's seat before Bartlett had decided to retire, made it impossible for him to continue as chief of staff. Otis ended up deciding not to run for the office.

Otis served as chair of the Ethics Commission of Frederick County from 2012 to 2013.

Otis joined as a campaign adviser for David E. Vogt, who ran for U.S. Representative in 2014. Vogt ended up withdrawing from the race.

Otis became a member of the Board of Elections of Frederick County in 2015.

=== Frederick County Council ===
In 2014, Otis ran as the Republican candidate for one of the two at-large positions on the first elected council of Frederick County. Otis was one of thirteen candidates for the two at-large seats.

Otis campaigned to reduce traffic by increasing the number of jobs in the county. Otis wanted to make sure roads were being built in pace with development, but he did not want development to be so dense that residents fail to interact with each other. Otis said he would reduce the county's budget spending and increase long-term planning for future expenses, such as building roads and schools.

Otis and Billy Shreve won the Republican primary election; Otis received 20 percent of the vote.

In the general election, Otis won an at-large seat on the Council with 27 percent of the total vote. Otis was sworn in on December 1, 2014.

Following his election to the Council, the editorial board of the Frederick News-Post endorsed Otis for council president. The county voted 4–3 to elect Otis president of the Council. Otis joined with three Democrats in repealing a law making English the official language of Frederick County.

Otis changed his party affiliation from Republican to unaffiliated on May 19, 2016. Otis said, "I think the direction of the Republican Central Committee is not where the majority of this county is, among Republican voters."
