= Robert J. Dennis =

CEO of Genesco

- Education: Rensselaer Polytechnic Institute
- Occupation: Businessman
- Known for: Previous Chairman of Genesco

Robert J. Dennis is an American businessman. He served as the chairman, chief executive officer and president of Genesco.

== Early life ==
Robert J. Dennis graduated from Rensselaer Polytechnic Institute, where he became a member of Phi Kappa Tau Fraternity and received a bachelor's degree, followed by a master's degree. He received a master's degree in business administration from the Harvard Business School.

== Career ==
Dennis worked for McKinsey & Company from 1984 to 1997. He worked for the Asbury Automotive Group from 1997 to 1999.

Dennis became the chief executive officer of Hat World, Inc. in 2001. When it was acquired by Genesco in June 2004, he became Genesco's senior vice president. He was appointed as its executive vice president and chief operating officer in 2005. He served as its chief executive officer and president and chairman until 2020.

Dennis served on the board of directors of Teavana Holdings from July 2011 to December 2012, when it was acquired by Starbucks. He has served on the board of directors of the Corrections Corporation of America since February 2013 and the Hospital Corporation of America since February 2014.

== Philanthropy ==
Dennis serves on the boards of trustees of the United Way of Metropolitan Nashville and the Nashville Symphony. He also serves on the board of visitors of the Owen Graduate School of Management at Vanderbilt University.
