= Donald R. Delauter =

United States Air Force general

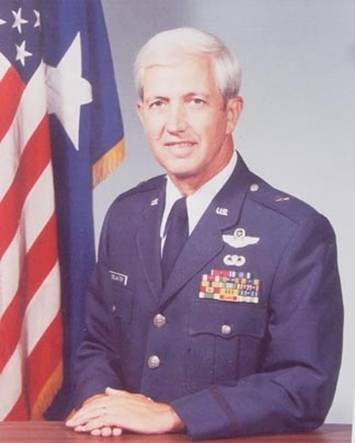
- Born: April 9, 1933 (age 93); Myersville, Maryland
- Military career
- Allegiance: United States of America
- Branch: United States Air Force
- Service years: 1956–1987
- Rank: Brigadier general
- Commands: Command Planning Staff, Headquarters NORAD, at Peterson Air Force Base, Colorado
- Awards: Defense Superior Service Medal; Legion of Merit with oak leaf cluster Distinguished Flying Cross; Meritorious Service Medal with oak leaf cluster Air Medal with 12 oak leaf clusters

Donald Raphael Delauter (born April 9, 1933) is a retired U.S. Air Force brigadier general and former director of the Command Planning Staff, Headquarters NORAD, at Peterson Air Force Base, Colorado.

Delauter earned a Bachelor of Science degree in agricultural economics from the University of Maryland, College Park, in 1955, a master of business administration degree from Ohio State University in 1968; and a master of education degree from Boston University at Stuttgart, West Germany, in 1977. He graduated from the Naval War College with highest distinction in 1975.

He entered active duty in March 1956 and was awarded his wings in May 1957. As a young pilot, he was a member of the famed 8th Tactical Fighter Squadron, the Black Sheep. He served as a fighter pilot in Vietnam in 1968–1969, flying 275 combat missions.

After graduating from the Naval War College, Delauter was assigned to headquarters of the U.S. European Command, Stuttgart, West Germany. In April 1978, he became vice-commander of the 32nd Tactical Fighter Squadron at Camp New Amsterdam, Netherlands, as that unit began conversion from F-4 Phantoms to F-15 Eagles. He assumed command of the squadron in November 1979 and also served there as United States' country representative.

General Delauter moved to 4th Allied Tactical Air Force headquarters at Heidelberg, West Germany, in August 1981 and served as assistant chief of staff for the Offensive Operations Division until November 1982. He then became the 4th Allied Tactical Air Force's deputy chief of staff for support. In October 1983, General Delauter became commander of the 23rd North American Aerospace Defense Command Region and Tactical Air Command Division at Tyndall Air Force Base, Florida. He retired in 1987 to become a commercial pilot.

== Awards and decorations ==
His military decorations and awards include the Defense Superior Service Medal, Legion of Merit with oak leaf cluster, Distinguished Flying Cross, Meritorious Service Medal with oak leaf cluster, Air Medal with 12 oak leaf clusters, Air Force Commendation Medal, Army Commendation Medal and Air Force Outstanding Unit Award Ribbon with "V" device and five oak leaf clusters.

- Defense Superior Service Medal
- Legion of Merit with one oak leaf cluster
- Distinguished Flying Cross
- Meritorious Service Medal with oak leaf cluster
- Air Medal with twelve oak leaf clusters
- Air Force Commendation Medal
- Army Commendation Medal
- Air Force Outstanding Unit Award with Valor Device and five oak leaf clusters

== Books ==
Donald Delauter is the author of three books of memoirs:

- "When the Eagle Soared" (2014)
- "The Lane Once Traveled" (2015)
- "Good As It Gets: My Best Job - Commander 32nd Fighter Squadron
