= The Gazette (Maryland) =

Weekly newspaper in Maryland

- Type: Weekly newspaper
- Owners: The Washington Post (1992–2013); Nash Holdings (2013–2015)
- Founder: Earle Hightower
- Founded: 1959; 67 years ago
- Ceased publication: June 18, 2015
- Language: English
- Headquarters: Gaithersburg, Maryland, U.S.
- Website: gazette.net

The Gazette published weekly community newspapers serving Montgomery, Prince George's, Frederick, and Carroll counties in Maryland, including a subscription-based weekend edition covering business and politics throughout the state. The group of papers consistently won awards from the Suburban Newspapers of America, and regional awards. It was based in Gaithersburg.

In June 2015, Nash Holdings said it would close the newspapers.

== History ==
The community newspaper group published ten Montgomery County editions (Germantown, Silver Spring/Takoma Park, Gaithersburg, Bethesda, Potomac, Burtonsville, Wheaton, Rockville, Olney and Damascus), two Carroll County editions (Mount Airy and Sykesville/Eldersburg) and eight Prince George's County editions (Largo, Hyattsville, College Park, Upper Marlboro, Bowie, Landover, Laurel and Clinton). The Gazette had been publishing weekly newspapers in the Maryland suburbs since 1959.

The Frederick County editions ceased publication in May and October 2013.

Jeff Bezos purchased the Gazette newspapers on August 5, 2013, as part of his $250 million cash purchase of the media holdings of The Washington Post Company. The transaction completed on October 1. Bezos established Nash Holdings LLC to acquire and control the Gazette.

In 2015, Nash Holdings announced it would close the Gazette, and cease publishing both its Montgomery County and Prince George's County editions. The closure, which was effective June 18, 2015, affected 69 employees and 12 reporters.

== Editions ==
- Montgomery Gazette

== Contributors ==
Contributors to the publication include notable writers, political activists and editors such as:

- Rob Redding
