= Paul Moyer Limbert =

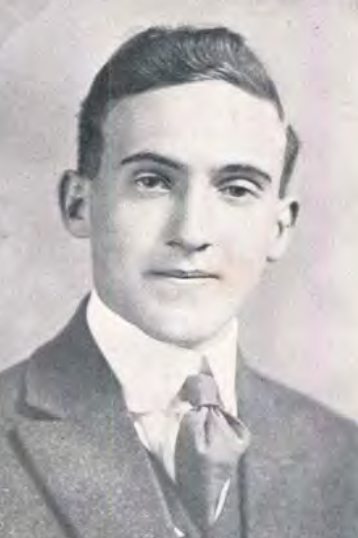
- Limbert, from the 1918 yearbook of Franklin and Marshall College
- Born: May 27, 1897; Grove City, Pennsylvania, U.S.
- Died: December 24, 1998 (aged 101); Black Mountain, North Carolina, U.S.
- Occupations: Clergyman, educator, college president, YMCA executive

Paul Moyer Limbert (May 27, 1897 – December 24, 1998) was a clergyman, educator and Secretary General of the World Alliance of YMCAs.

== Early life and education ==
Limbert was born in Grove City, Pennsylvania, the son of George Elias Limbert and Flora Moyer Limbert. He earned a bachelor's degree at Franklin and Marshall College in 1918 and divinity degree at the Lancaster Theological Seminary in 1922. He earned a master's degree from Union Theological Seminary, and a Ph.D. from Teachers College, Columbia University in 1929.

== Career ==
Limbert lectured and taught at many American universities. He was an assistant professor of religion at Franklin and Marshall College from 1923 to 1931. He was president of Springfield College from 1946 to 1952. In 1952, he was named Secretary General of the World Alliance of YMCAs in Geneva, Switzerland. During his tenure, the YMCA celebrated its centennial in 1955, and Limbert visited many YMCAs in over sixty nations. "It was an eye-opener to get into all these different countries and see the YMCAs in different settings," he later recalled.

After his term ended, Limbert traveled, lectured and wrote articles dealing with YMCA history. He was president of the Association of Retired YMCA Directors for nine years. In 1983, he received the Cook Memorial Award, from the Western North Carolina chapter of the United Nations Association. In 1985, at age 88, he was named as the first inductee into the YMCA Hall of Fame. In 1994, he attended the 150th anniversary of the YMCA in London, at Westminster Abbey.

== Publications ==
- Denominational Policies in the Support and Supervision of Higher Education (1929)
- What Children Think about War (1933)
- Educating for Civic Responsibility: A Guide to Policy and Practice in Public Affairs Education (1941)
- Christians Face War (1944)
- Christian Emphasis in YMCA Program: A Guide to Policy and Practice for Young Men's Christian Associations (1944)
- The Promise of Association: A History of the Mission and Work of the YMCA at the University of Illinois, 1873-1997 (1997, with Scott Joseph Peters)
- Reliving a Century (1997)

== Personal life ==
Limbert married Anna Myers. She died in 1984. He was survived by their two daughters when he died at the age of 101 in 1998, at a retirement community he helped to establish, in Black Mountain, North Carolina.
