= Robert J. Parrillo =

American businessman and attorney

Robert John Parrillo (born March 14, 1941), is an American businessman and attorney. Parrillo is a founder and managing partner of Parrillo, Weiss, & O'Halloran, a Chicago-based law firm specializing in personal injury and insurance cases. Parrillo was also the largest shareholder of Safeway Insurance Group, which was founded by his brother, William Parrillo.

== Education ==
Parrillo graduated from the University of Colorado Boulder and earned his juris doctor from Northwestern University School of Law. Parrillo is an active alumni and donor to Northwestern Law School. He has dedicated the Parrillo Courtroom, and has funded the Parrillo CPS Scholarship which is designed to aide Chicago Public School students.

== Business interests ==
As of 1990, Robert Parrillo was the largest shareholder of Safeway Insurance Group owning approximately 40 percent of Safeway's stock. The Safeway Insurance Group is the largest, privately held, family owned insurance company in the United States.

=== Parrillo, Weiss, & O'Halloran ("PWO") ===
In 1967 Parrillo founded the law firm which in 2012 was named Parrillo, Weiss, & O’Halloran (PWO). In 2005, Parrillo was named an Illinois super lawyer by the Thomson Reuter super lawyers rating service.

PWO primarily defends insurance companies in automobile accident injury claims. PWO has previously been the most active in Cook County's mandatory arbitration system, and handled the most jury trials in Cook County, which boasts the largest unified court system in the nation.

=== Sun-Times Media Group ===
In 2009, Parrillo was among a ten-member group of investors (along with his brother William, Jim Tyree and Rocky Wirtz) that purchased the Sun-Times Media Group. Parrillo served as lead director. The investor group is credited for rescuing the Chicago Sun-Times from bankruptcy and ensuring that Chicago remained a two-newspaper town.

== Other pursuits ==
As of 2006 Parrillo owned three penthouses, in Chicago on Wacker Drive, on Lake Shore Drive, and at the Waldorf-Astoria Hotel, Chicago

Parrillo has filed lawsuits as a plaintiff. In 1983, Parrillo represented his future wife, Elizabeth Ackerman, in a $1.6 million breach of contract suit. Parrillo has also sued Panasonic, American Airlines, S.A.S., William H. Kelly Co., Hayman Co., and United Airlines.
