= The Frederick News-Post =

Newspaper in Frederick, Maryland, US

- Type: Daily newspaper
- Format: Broadsheet
- Owner: Ogden Newspapers Inc.
- Publisher: Geordie Wilson
- Founded: 1883; 143 years ago (as The News)
- Headquarters: 351 Ballenger Center Drive; Frederick, Maryland 21703; 39.39615°N 77.42576°W
- Sister newspapers: The Frederick Post (1916–2002) (merged to form The Frederick News-Post)
- OCLC number: 31371730
- Website: fredericknewspost.com

The Frederick News-Post is the local newspaper of Frederick County, Maryland. In addition to discussing local news, the newspaper addresses international, national, and regional news. The paper publishes six days per week.

== History ==
On October 15, 1883, a Frederick printing company first published The News, an evening newspaper that would eventually become The Frederick News-Post. William T. Delaplaine, grandfather of the current president of Great Southern, began his business career in Frederick in 1880 when he opened a small printing shop. He expanded the operation by establishing the first daily newspaper in Frederick, The News, in October 1883. The business was incorporated in June 1888.

A competing daily newspaper, The Frederick Post, began publication in December 1910, and several years later was purchased by Great Southern, which remained a family-owned business. Surviving members of the third generation of the founder are Mr. Delaplaine and Mrs. Frances A. Randall, and fourth-generation members were involved in the businesses.

In 1916, through a business deal, The News acquired The Frederick Post, publishing The News in the evenings and The Frederick Post in the morning.

In 2002, the two papers were merged to create a single morning edition known as The Frederick News-Post. The Sunday edition created in October of that year created a true daily paper published 365 days a year.

Publisher George E. Randall died in 2004. He was a fourth-generation descendant of the founder. His brother, Myron Randall, Junior was named president and publisher. William B. Randall, Myron Randall's son and a fifth-generation family member, joined the company.

The News-Post moved into a new building in April 2008, with a new high-speed, six-tower TKS press capable of printing 70,000 copies an hour.

In early November 2008, Randall Family LLC, publisher of The Frederick News-Post, laid off 16 employees, four from the newsroom. The total layoffs represented about 7% of the company's workforce, and were the result of a dramatic drop in advertising revenue over the preceding two years. It was the first time in company history that layoffs had been issued.

In 2009, The Frederick News-Post suspended its Monday edition, making the paper available six days a week. Employees were forced to take five-day furloughs, and the company reduced its pension benefits to employees.

In 2011, The Frederick News-Post named Geordie Wilson as publisher. Wilson previously had served as publisher of the Concord Monitor of Concord, New Hampshire, and as publisher of the Monadnock Ledger (now the Monadnock Ledger-Transcript) of Peterborough, New Hampshire. Myron Randall remained president of Randall Family LLC.

In 2012, The Frederick News-Post resumed Monday publication, citing subscriber demand. The revived Monday edition had a tabloid format, as opposed to the larger broadsheet format used by the paper the rest of the week, and it had a business and sports focus.

On May 1, 2017, the Randall family sold the News-Post to Ogden Newspapers Inc., a family-owned newspaper group from Wheeling, West Virginia.

In May 2020, due to financial struggles and the impact of the coronavirus pandemic, The Frederick News-Post combined its Saturday and Sunday editions, printing a weekend edition on Saturdays. It also increased the single copy price of its newspaper from $1 to $2 for Monday–Friday editions, and from $2 to $3 for Saturday editions.
