= Nathan Bedford Forrest (disambiguation) =

Nathan Bedford Forrest was a Confederate General in the American Civil War.

Nathan Bedford Forrest may also refer to:

- Nathan Bedford Forrest II (1872–1931), his grandson, leader of the Sons of Confederate Veterans and Grand Dragon the Second Era Ku Klux Klan
- Nathan Bedford Forrest III (1905–1943), son of the above, general in World War II
