= Gender issues in the American Civil War =

During the American Civil War, sexual behavior, gender roles, and attitudes were affected by the conflict, especially by the absence of menfolk at home and the emergence of new roles for women such as nursing. Clothing adapted to these new roles, becoming more practical and functional as women took on additional responsibilities. The advent of photography and easier media distribution, for example, allowed for greater access to sexual material for the common soldier, while the changes in women's clothing reflected broader societal adjustments to the war's demands.

== Nursing ==
=== Union ===
During the Civil War (1861–65), the United States Sanitary Commission, a federal civilian agency, handled most of the medical and nursing care of the Union armies, together with necessary acquisition and transportation of medical supplies. Dorothea Dix, serving as the commission's Superintendent, was able to convince the medical corps of the value of women working in 350 Commission or Army hospitals. North and South, over 20,000 women volunteered to work in hospitals, usually in nursing care. They assisted surgeons during procedures, gave medicines, supervised the feedings and cleaned the bedding and clothes. They gave good cheer, wrote letters the men dictated, and comforted the dying. A representative nurse was Helen L. Gilson (1835–1868) of Chelsea, Massachusetts, who served in Sanitary Commission. She supervised supplies, dressed wounds, and cooked special foods for patients on a limited diet. She worked in hospitals after the battles of Antietam, Fredericksburg, Chancellorsville, Gettysburg. She was a successful administrator, especially at the hospital for black soldiers at City Point, Virginia. The middle-class women North and South who volunteered provided vitally needed nursing services and were rewarded with a sense of patriotism and civic duty in addition to opportunity to demonstrate their skills and gain new ones, while receiving wages and sharing the hardships of the men.

Another representative for nurses working for the Union armies was Louisa May Alcott, who was a volunteer nurse for six weeks in Georgetown of Washington, D.C. Alcott wrote letters to her family, chronologicalizing her time as a volunteer nurse. She can be quoted in her remarks regarding the soldiers saying how much she "yearned to serve the dreariest of them all."

Mary Livermore, Mary Ann Bickerdyke, and Annie Wittenmeyer played leadership roles. After the war some nurses wrote memoirs of their experiences; examples include Dix, Livermore, Sarah Palmer Young, and Sarah Emma Edmonds. Clara Barton (1821–1912) gained fame for her nursing work during the American Civil War. She was an energetic organizer who established the American Red Cross, which was primarily a disaster relief agency but which also supported nursing programs.

=== Confederate nurses ===
Several thousand women were just as active in nursing in the Confederacy, but were less well organized and faced severe shortages of supplies and a much weaker system of 150 hospitals. Nursing and vital support services were provided not only by matrons and nurses, but also by local volunteers, slaves, free blacks, and prisoners of war.

== Homefront ==
=== Union ===
Union military occupation in the South during the Civil War led to significant disruptions in traditional gender roles. As Confederate men were absent from home, Southern women took on new responsibilities, including managing plantations and negotiating with Union forces. Some women used these interactions to assert greater authority over their households, challenging established patriarchal structures (Whites, 2015). While men were fighting, many Northern wives needed to learn how to farm and do other manual labor. Besides having to tend to the home and children while the men were away at war, women also contributed supplies. Quilts and blankets were often given to soldiers. Some had encouraging messages sewn on them. They also sent shirts, sheets, pillows, pillowcases, coats, vests, trousers, towels, handkerchiefs, socks, bandages, canned fruits, dried fruits, butter, cheese, wine, eggs, pickles, books, and magazines.

=== Confederacy ===
At the start of the war, Southern women zealously supported the men going off to war. They saw the men as protectors and invested heavily in the romantic idea of men fighting to defend the honor of their country, family, and way of life. Mothers and wives were able to keep in contact with their loved ones who had chosen to enlist by writing them letters. African American women, on the other hand, had experienced the breakup of families for generations and were once again dealing with this issue at the outbreak of war.

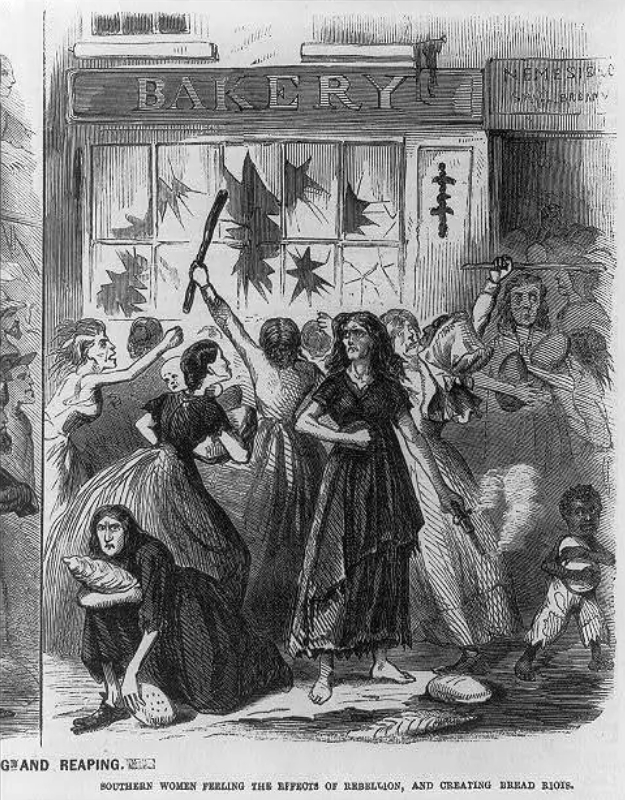
Richmond bread riot, 1863

By summer 1861, the Union naval blockade virtually shut down the export of cotton and the import of manufactured goods. Food that formerly came overland was cut off.

Women had charge of making do. They cut back on purchases, brought out old spinning wheels and enlarged their gardens with peas and peanuts to provide clothing and food. They used ersatz substitutes when possible, but there was no real coffee and it was hard to develop a taste for the okra or chicory substitutes used. The households were severely hurt by inflation in the cost of everyday items and the shortages of food, fodder for the animals, and medical supplies for the wounded. The Georgia legislature imposed cotton quotas, making it a crime to grow an excess. But food shortages only worsened, especially in the towns.

The overall decline in food supplies, made worse by the collapsing transportation system, led to serious shortages and high prices in urban areas. When bacon reached a dollar a pound in 1863, the poor women of Richmond, Atlanta and many other cities began to riot; they broke into shops and warehouses to seize food. The women expressed their anger at ineffective state relief efforts, speculators, merchants and planters. As wives and widows of soldiers they were hurt by the inadequate welfare system.

Upper-class plantation mistresses often had to manage the estates which the younger men had left behind. Overseers of the slaves were exempt from the draft, and usually remained on the plantations. Historian Jonathan Wiener studied the census data on plantations in black-belt counties, 1850–70, and found that the War did not drastically alter the responsibilities and roles of women. The age of the groom increased as younger women married older planters, and birth rates dropped sharply during 1863-68 during Reconstruction. However, plantation mistresses were not more likely to operate plantations than in earlier years, nor was there a lost generation of women without men.

== Clothing and Gender ==
=== Importance of Clothing ===
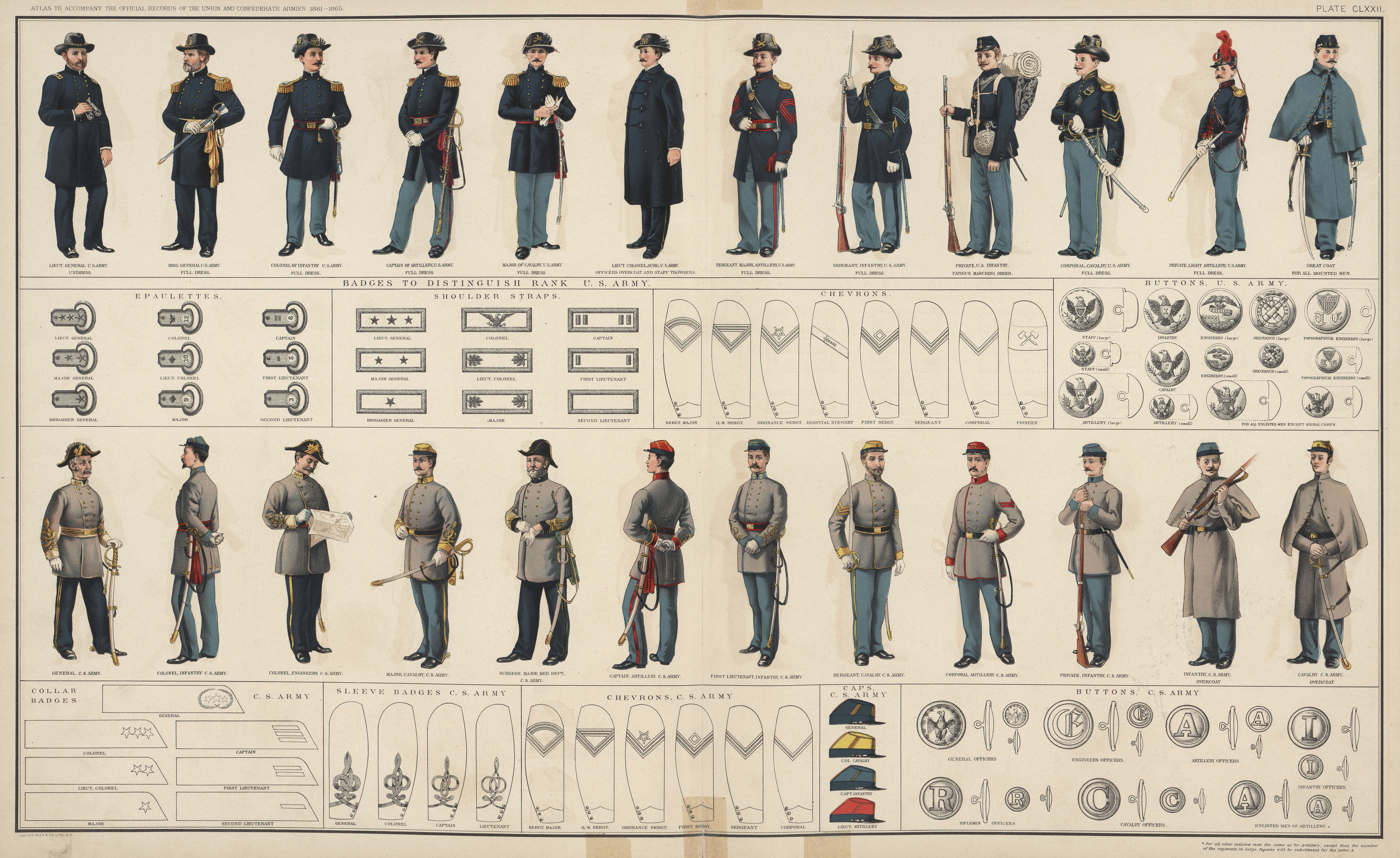
Illustrations of Union (blue) and Confederate (gray) uniforms from the "Atlas to Accompany the Official Records of the Union and Confederate Armies" (1895).

During the American Civil War, clothing played a pivotal role. It served as a visual language that reinforced and performed gender roles, with women's attire often reflecting their new responsibilities and societal expectations. Clothing choices were not merely practical but also symbolic, as individuals used garments to express allegiance to the Union or Confederacy, with items like homespun fabrics and battle flags becoming potent symbols of patriotism and political stance. Moreover, clothing was a key tool in reinforcing gender norms, as women who disguised themselves as men to enlist in the army used clothing to conceal their gender, while traditional feminine attire continued to emphasize domestic roles. Through these expressions, clothing became an integral part of the cultural and social fabric of the era, influencing perceptions of identity, status, and allegiance.

=== Men's clothing ===
Military uniforms played a crucial role in distinguishing between Union and Confederate soldiers. Union soldiers typically wore dark blue wool uniforms, while Confederates wore gray or butternut-colored uniforms, which often became weathered and faded to a brownish hue. The uniforms were not only functional but also symbolic, reflecting allegiance and military hierarchy. The differences in materials, colors, and styles were significant, with the Union having access to industrial-scale production of wool uniforms, whereas the Confederacy relied more on cotton and homespun fabrics due to supply constraints.

In civilian life, the war impacted men's clothing through shortages and displays of mourning. As resources were diverted to the military, civilian clothing became simpler and more practical. Men's fashion was influenced by military styles, with elements like shoulder pads and straight silhouettes becoming more common.

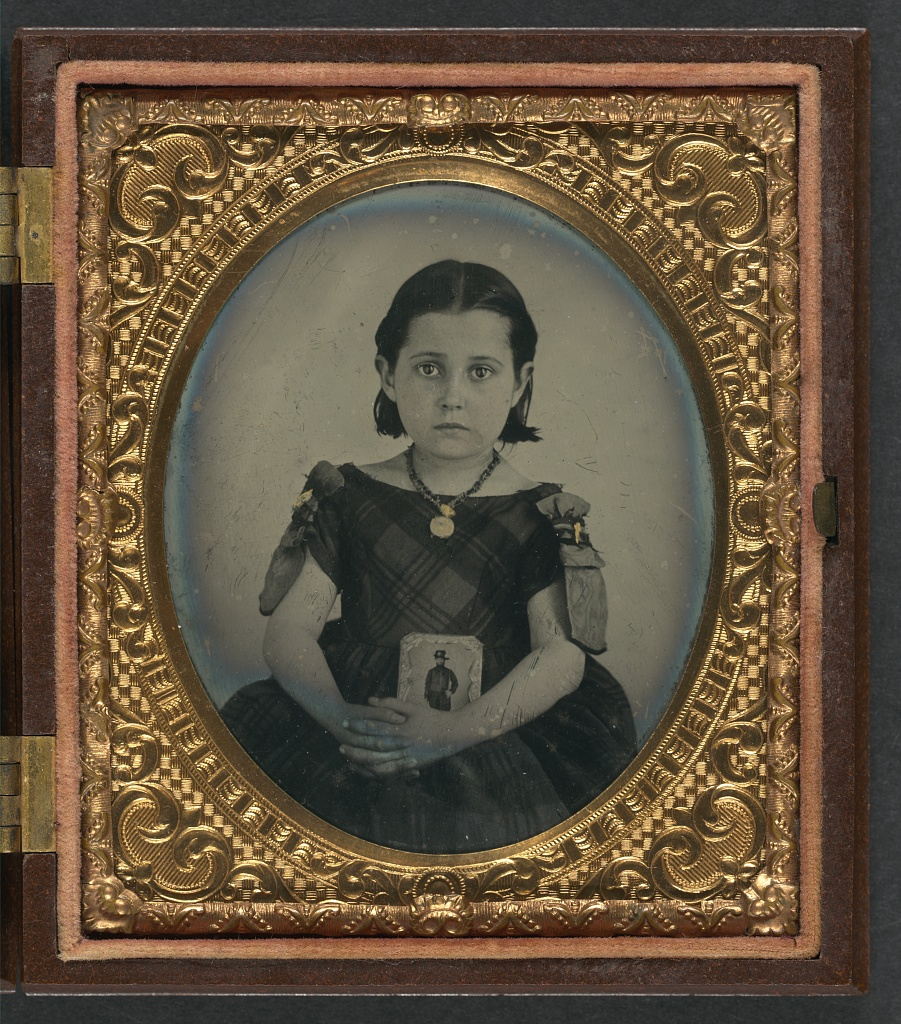
Unidentified girl in mourning dress holding framed photograph of her father as a cavalryman with sword and Hardee hat

Mourning attire, particularly for women, was a significant social expectation during the Civil War. Traditionally, widows and families of the deceased wore black dresses, veils, and accessories made of specific fabrics like crepe. However, wartime shortages and inflation made it difficult for many families to obtain appropriate mourning clothes. As a result, some had to repurpose existing garments or forego traditional mourning attire altogether, which could lead to social stigma or personal distress. The inability to properly observe mourning customs underscored the broader impact of the war on daily life and social rituals.

Clothing as identity was also prevalent, as it distinguished between classes, occupations, and political affiliations. For instance, wealthy individuals maintained elaborate attire to signify their status, while those in lower classes adopted simpler, more practical clothing. Clothing choices could also express political allegiance, with symbols and colors used to show support for either the Union or the Confederacy. Overall, clothing during the Civil War served as a powerful tool for expressing identity, allegiance, and social status.

Class differences were evident in both military and civilian clothing. Wealthier officers often commissioned custom-tailored uniforms with finer fabrics and elaborate insignia, while enlisted men, especially in the Confederacy, sometimes wore uniforms made from homespun materials or whatever was available. In civilian life, affluent men could afford to keep up with fashion trends and import fabrics, even during shortages, whereas working-class men wore practical, often patched or repurposed garments. For example, a Southern planter might still appear in a well-made wool suit, while a laborer wore coarse cotton or linen, highlighting the persistent social divide.

=== Women's clothing ===
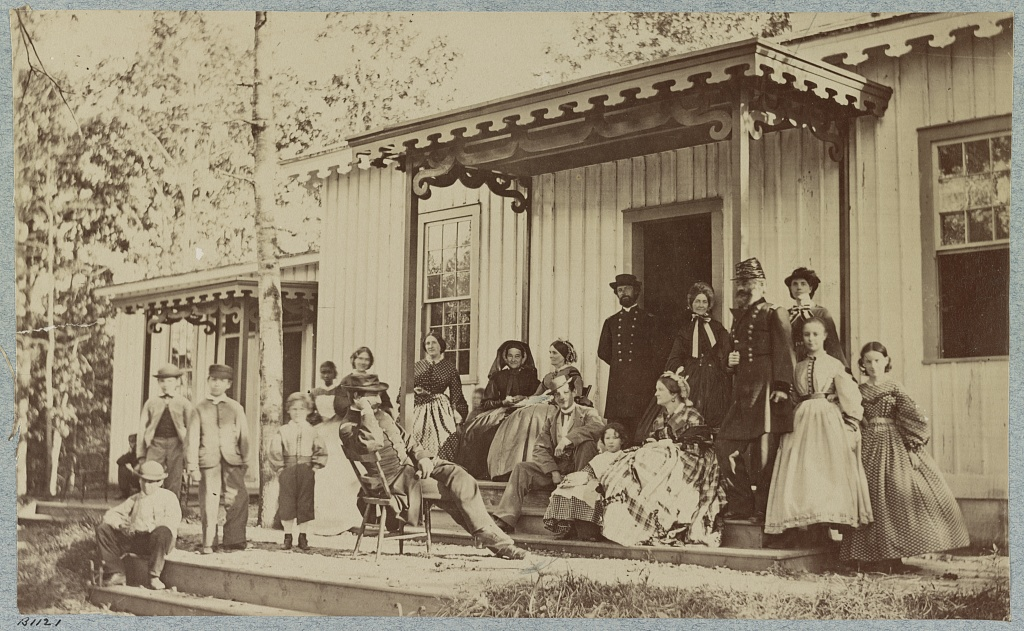
Gen. S. P. Heintzelman and group, convalescent camp, near Alexandria, Va.

During the American Civil War, women's clothing underwent significant changes due to wartime shortages and demands. On the homefront, women adapted their fashion by using homespun fabrics, which became a symbol of Southern patriotism and resilience in the face of blockades that limited access to new materials. Clothing was often repurposed, with women altering existing garments to create new outfits or using household materials to craft clothing. As women took on more practical roles, simpler styles became more common, reflecting their engagement in war work such as nursing and managing farms.

Clothing also served as a form of symbolic expression, with women wearing colors or displaying emblems associated with their allegiance to either the Union or the Confederacy. For example, Confederate women expressed their political views through clothing. They sewed Confederate flags into their dresses, wore secessionist colors, and made uniforms for soldiers, using fashion as a form of political statement. They also actively contributed to the war effort by creating clothing and blankets for soldiers.

Meanwhile, women who disguised themselves as soldiers to enlist in the army used clothing as a crucial tool for concealment. They would bind their chests and obtain and alter men's clothing to maintain their disguise, facing challenges in sustaining this deception amidst the rigors of military life.

=== Dr. Mary Edwards Walker ===
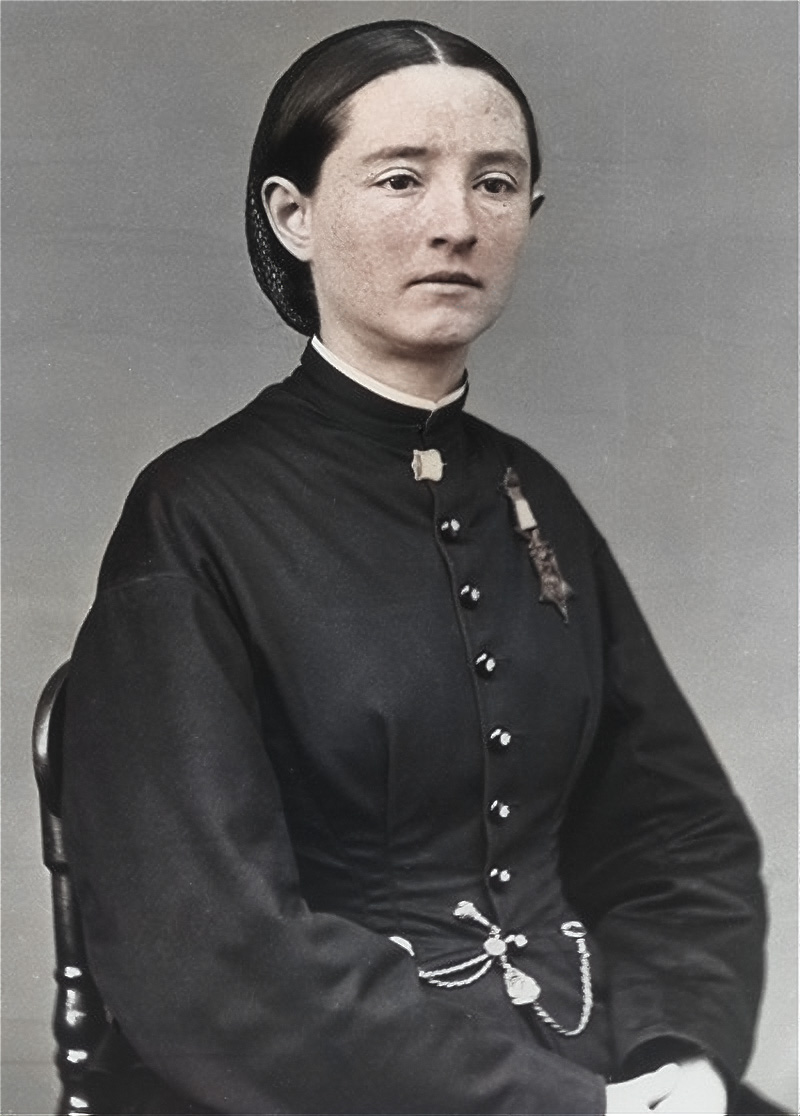
Mary Edwards Walker

Dr. Mary Edwards Walker was a pioneering surgeon during the Civil War and the only woman to receive the Medal of Honor. She is now also recognized on the U.S. quarter coin. During the war, she challenged gender norms and, unlike women who disguised themselves as men to enlist, Walker openly wore men's clothing, arguing that such clothing was more practical for her medical duties. Her refusal to conform to traditional women's dress sparked controversy and even led to her arrest on several occasions, but also made her a powerful symbol of women's rights. Walker's clothing choices highlighted the intersection of gender, profession, and social expectations, leaving a lasting impact on both medical and women's history.

=== Clothing of the enslaved people ===
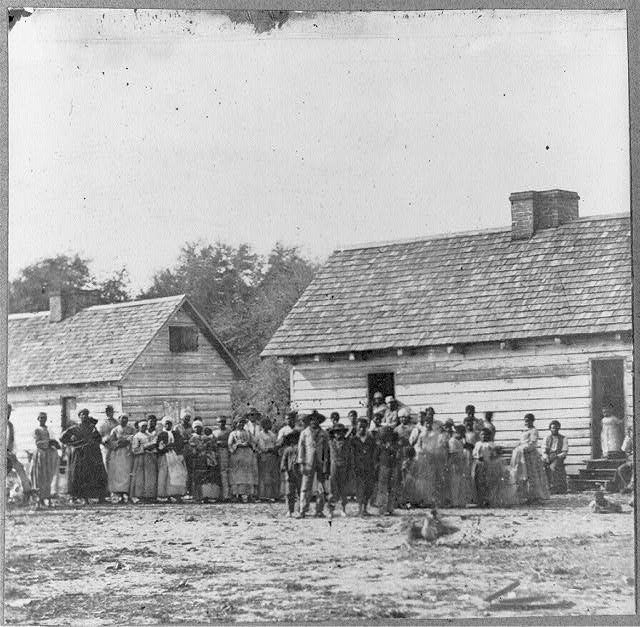
Large group of enslaved people standing in front of buildings on Smith's Plantation, Beaufort, South Carolina

The clothing provided to enslaved individuals was typically minimal, plain, and of poor quality. Slave owners distributed coarse fabrics like osnaburg, a rough unbleached linen, which was used to make basic garments such as shirts and shifts. These fabrics were chosen for their durability rather than for their comfort or fashion, reflecting the dehumanizing conditions of slavery. Clothing was also used as a tool of control, with slave codes dictating what enslaved people could wear, often limiting them to "negro cloth" or similar inexpensive materials.

However, clothing also played a significant role in the pursuit of freedom. For those escaping enslavement, clothing could be a means of disguise or a symbol of dignity. Enslaved individuals who managed to acquire finer garments often used them to blend in with free society, aiding their escape. Despite the hardships of bondage, enslaved women cared about their appearance and found creative outlets in their attire. House slaves often dressed better than field workers and sometimes received discarded clothing from their mistresses. After emancipation, shedding old clothing became a symbolic act of freedom, as newly freed individuals adopted new attire to express their identity and celebrate their liberation.

== Female soldiers ==
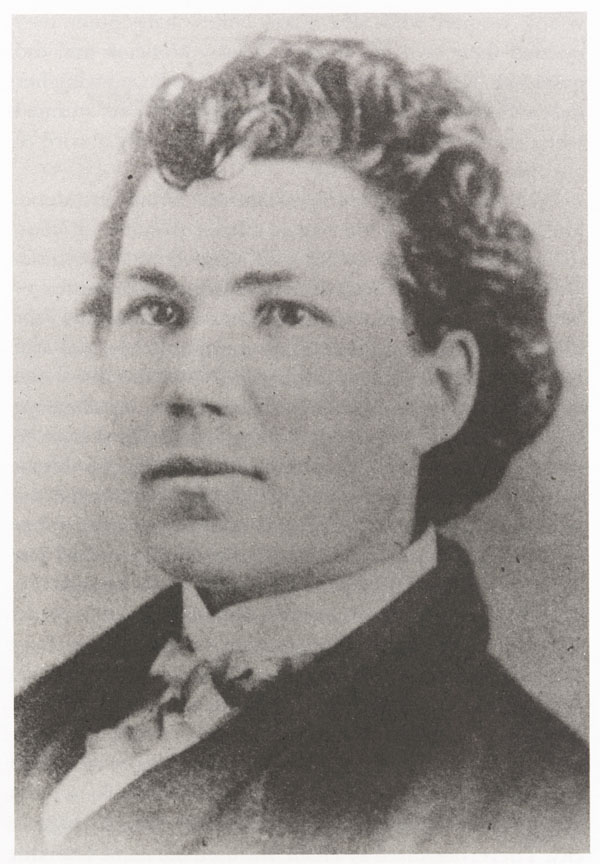
Sarah Emma Edmonds, i.e. Franklin Thompson

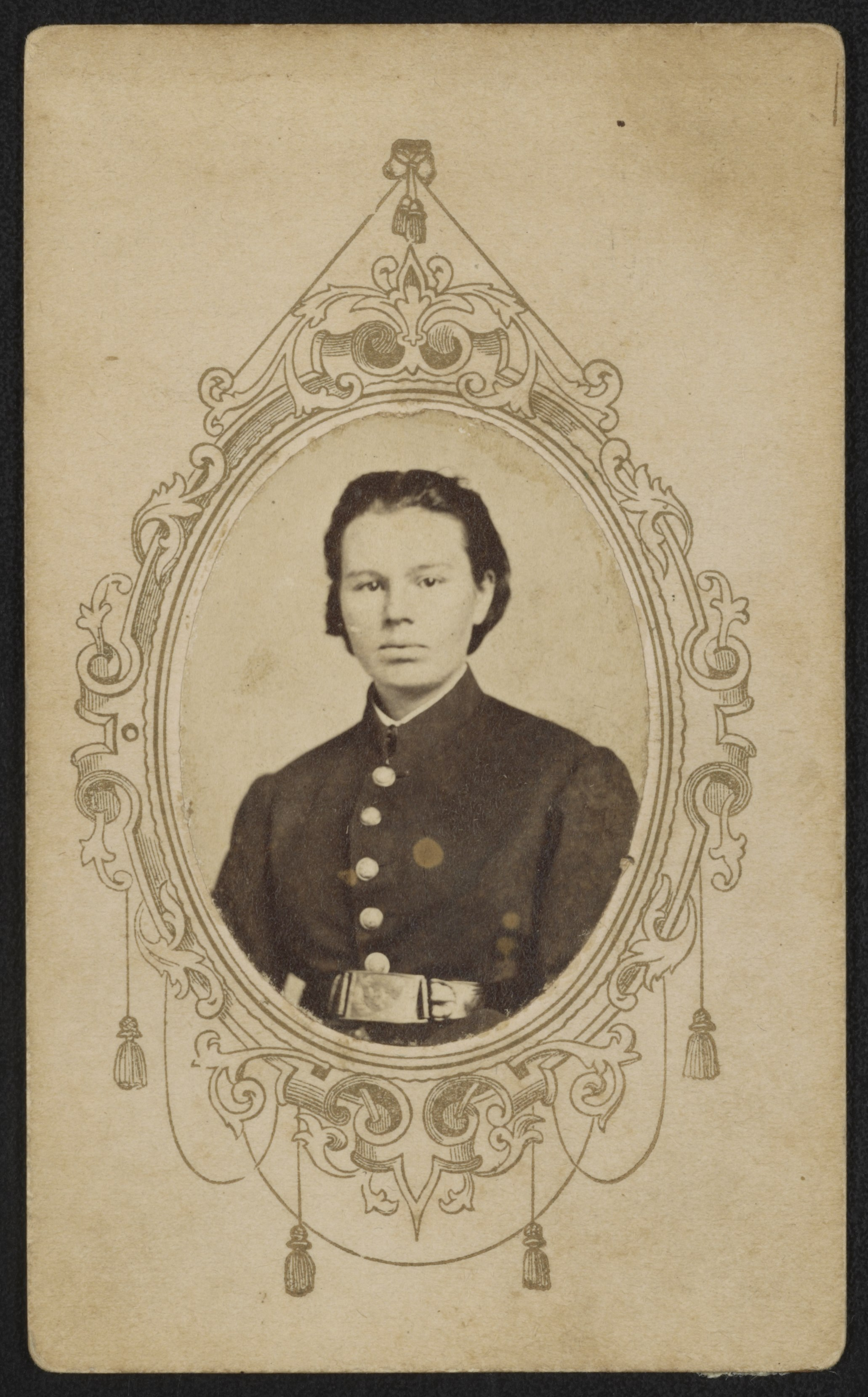
Frances Hook, also known as Private Frank Miller, Frank Henderson, and Frank Fuller, was discovered to be a woman when she was wounded at the Battle of Fredericktown, Missouri. Afterwards, she enlisted in another regiment and was captured at Florence, Alabama, and imprisoned in Atlanta where again she was discovered to be a woman.

The number of female soldiers in the war is estimated at between 400 and 750, although an accurate count is impossible because the women had to disguise themselves as men. A Union officer was once quoted regarding how a Union sergeant was "in violation of all military law" by giving birth to child, and this was not the only case where the true sex of a soldier was discovered due to childbirth. A captured Confederate officer whose true sex was previously unknown by the guards gave birth in a Union prison camp.

The Civil War was generally a time of challenges to traditional gender norms, as women mobilized themselves to participate in the war effort and left the home in droves to serve as charity workers, nurses, clerks, farm laborers, and political activists. Across the Confederacy, upper-class women assembled all-female home guard militias, drilling firearms usage and training to protect their plantations, properties, and neighborhoods from Union invasion. Military training became mandatory at some private girls' academies. One female militia in LaGrange, Georgia—a uniquely militarily vulnerable city, poised halfway between the industrial powerhouse of Atlanta and the original Confederate capital at Montgomery, Alabama—engaged in diplomatic negotiations with the invading Union army in April 1865, using the threat of violence to obtain a promise that their city would not be ransacked. As concerted a challenge to gender norms as these all-female militias would seem to pose, however, the participants were careful to otherwise keep well within gender norms, and to avoid the impression of usurping male protective roles.

The most dramatic and extreme challenge to gender roles, then, came with those women who participated in the Civil War as fully enlisted combatants. Though not particularly well known today, it is estimated that there are over 1000 women who enlisted in both the Union and Confederate armies under assumed male identities. The female soldiers were not operating within a vacuum, responding blindly to the stimulus of war. Unlike the members of the all-female militias, the female enlisted soldiers were drawn disproportionately from working- and lower-middle-class backgrounds—and therefore represented a radically different cultural milieu. Mid-nineteenth-century working-class culture, for example, was generally familiar—if not comfortable—with female cross-dressing, with the phenomenon being prominently featured in popular theatrical and literary pieces with mass audiences.

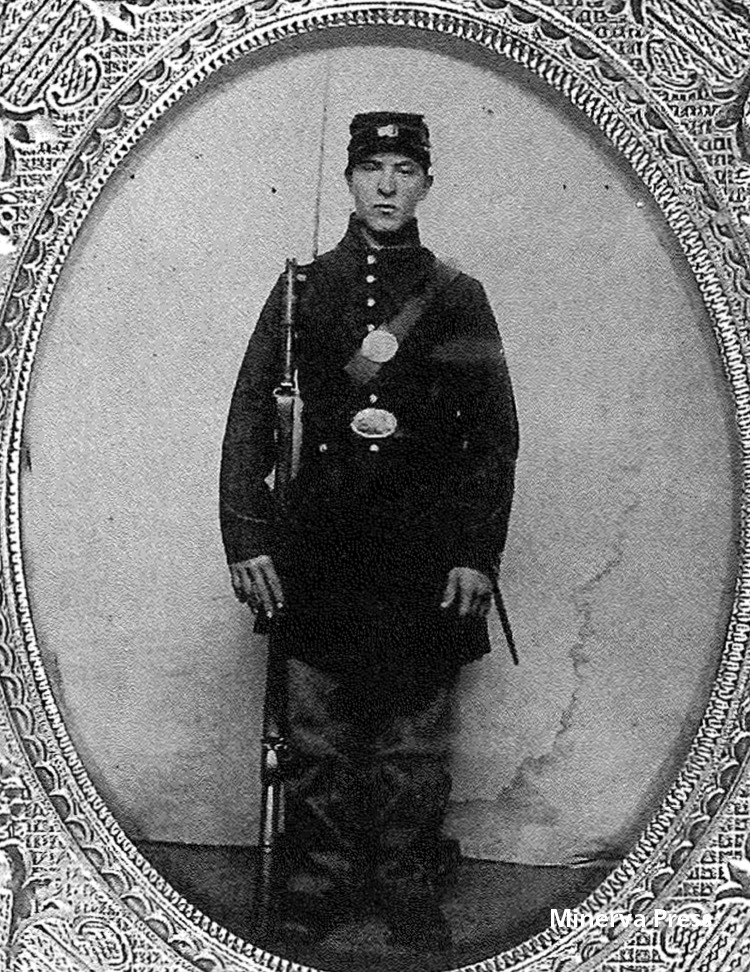
Sarah Rosetta Wakeman, i.e. Pvt. Lyons Wakeman of the 153rd New York Volunteer Infantry

Women had different motivations for joining the army, just as did their male counterparts. A common reason was to escape pre-arranged marriages. Sarah Edmonds, for example, left her home in maritime Canada and fled to the United States to avoid marriage—but took the ultimate protective step of dressing as a man and enlisting in the Union Army to avoid detection. Loreta Janeta Velazquez, on the other hand, was driven to enlist by more personal motivations; inspired by the example of Joan of Arc and other historical women warriors, she was idealistic about feminine potential on the battlefield, insisting that, "when women have rushed to the battlefield, they have invariably distinguished themselves." Sarah Rosetta Wakeman had been living as a man long before the outbreak of the war, hoping to find better-paying work on the riverboats of New York rather than as a female domestic servant. She was, therefore, compelled to enlist by an economic imperative; the prospect of steady pay as an enlisted soldier in the Union Army appeared to be preferable to the instability of day labor. Whatever the original motivations of the individual female soldiers, however, they ultimately took part in the war on similar terms as their male brothers-in-arms.

The existence of illicit female soldiers was an open secret in both the wartime Union and Confederacy, with stories commonly shared in both soldiers' letters and newspaper articles. Awareness trickled out into the general public—and civilians were fascinated by these women warriors. This curiosity is reflected in the literature of the period. Wartime romance novels idealised these women as heroines sacrificing themselves for love of country and menfolk, while Frank Moore's popular 1866 history Women and the Civil War: Their Heroism and Their Sacrifice prominently featured an entire chapter on the female soldiers of the war. Although it establishes the fact that women warriors were objects of curiosity for the American public, Moore significantly softened and romanticised their experiences in order to make them more palatable to a general audience. For instance, Moore refers to one particular female soldier as an "American Joan of Arc", attempting to frame her wartime exploits within a recognisable paradigm of holy war and divine inspiration.

Regardless of generally warm popular opinion, however, female soldiers actually faced significant suspicion and opposition from within the armies themselves. Female soldiers were generally successful at physically disguising themselves; their shorter height, higher voices, and lack of facial hair escaped comment in an army heavily dominated by adolescent boys, while their own feminine shapes could be obscured through breast-binding. Recruits deemed to be of ambiguous gender, for example, were often subjected to improvised tests to check their gendered responses. One such test was to toss a soldier an apple; if he held out his shirttails to catch the apple as if in an apron, he would be deemed to be a woman, and would be subject to further investigation. Female soldiers who were most successful at blending into military life were those who had been presenting as male even before they had enlisted: Sarah Wakeman, for example, had been living as a man and working on canal boats in New York prior to joining the Union army, while Jennie Hodgers had likewise assumed a masculine identity long before the outbreak of the war.

Women who passed the scrutiny of their fellow soldiers, however, were nonetheless expected to perform to the same standard—and so female soldiers largely blended in with their male fellows-in-arms, performing the same duties with fairly minimal risk of exposure. Those who were caught typically were exposed while wounded and receiving medical care in battlefront hospitals. Others, however, escaped detection for the entire war, and returned home to resume their normal lives and feminine gender expression—with a few notable exceptions. Female veteran Sarah Edmonds, the runaway Canadian bride, lived under the masculine identity of Franklin Thompson for the rest of her life, and even was granted a pension for her service by Congress in 1886, while Jennie Hodgers continued living as Albert Cashier before being discovered and forced back into feminine dress after having been institutionalized for dementia in 1913. The participation of so many women in the Civil War, however, was an uncomfortable subject for the US Army for many decades; the fact of female service was officially denied by the army until well in the twentieth century.

== Rape ==
Some soldiers engaged in acts of rape. The Confederate records were destroyed, but a perusal of only five percent of Federal records reveal that over thirty court martial trials were held due to instances of rape; death by hanging or firing squad being the usual punishment if convicted. Sometimes, offering money for sex to a white woman of good standing was considered almost tantamount to rape; in the case of an Illinois private at Camp Dennison, for example, the perpetrator spent a month at the guardhouse for offering a mother a dollar and her daughter three dollars for sex. Federal troops who committed rape while invading the Southern states mostly took advantage of black women rather than white women, and black soldiers were usually punished more severely for the crime than their white counterparts. Even so, the fear of rape was omnipresent among white southern women facing the prospect of invasion without male protection; although specific numbers of victims are difficult to trace, the threat of sexual violence committed by Union soldiers lingered in Southern cultural memory long after the war ended.

On April 24, 1863, Union President Abraham Lincoln signed the Lieber Code, which amongst other things contained one of the first explicit prohibitions on rape. Paragraphs 44 and 47 of the Lieber Code contained provisions prohibiting several crimes including "(...) all rape (...) by an American soldier in a hostile country against its inhabitants (...) under the penalty of death, or such other severe punishment as may seem adequate for the gravity of the offense." Thus, the only enforcement mechanisms were the military commanders themselves, having the right to execute the soldiers immediately.

== Homosexuality ==
The term "homosexuality" was not coined until thirty years after the war ended. However, no army soldiers were disciplined for such activity, although three pairs of Union Navy sailors were punished, all in 1865.

There was only one case of male prostitution reported during the war. The Richmond Dispatch reported on May 13, 1862, that since the moving of the Confederacy's capital to Richmond that "loose males of the most abandoned character from other parts of the Confederacy" had moved to Richmond and "prostitutes of both sexes" openly displayed themselves in carriages and on sidewalks.

Scholars have tried to ascertain if certain Civil War figures were homosexual. The most notable of these was Confederate major general Patrick Cleburne, although it is still disputed.

== In camp ==
At camp, "barracks favorites" were available. These were inexpensive novels of a sexual nature. Photographs of nudity were available as well, and were purchased by both enlisted men and officers. These twelve by fifteen inch pictures cost $1.20 for a dozen, or ten cents for a single picture. These were usually pictures of nude women doing innocent things; nude women that were engaging in actual sexual activity were usually not white, but either black or Native American. With the soldiers being far away from their wives and sweethearts, it is speculated these were used for masturbation, and not just for entertainment. Only three of the novels are still known to exist; they are located at the Kinsey Institute of Indiana University in Bloomington, Indiana.

However, this is not to say women were not available for sex. Prostitutes were among the camp followers following behind marching troops. Popular legend has it that they were so common around the Army of the Potomac when Union general Joseph Hooker was in command that the term "hooker" was coined to describe them; however, the term had been in use since 1845. The number of prostitutes around Hooker's division only "cemented" the term.

This led to many cases of venereal disease. Among white Union soldiers there was a total of 73,382 syphilis cases and 109,397 gonorrhea cases. The total rate of venereal disease among the white Union troops was 82 cases per 1,000 men, where before and after the war the rate was 87 of 1,000. Union black troops, however, had rates of 34 per 1,000 for syphilis and 44 per 1,000 for gonorrhea. Cases were most prominent around larger cities like Nashville, Tennessee; New Orleans; Richmond, Virginia; and Washington, D.C. Numbers for Confederates are unknown, but are assumed to be less, due to Confederate soldiers being less likely to be in cities.

== Prostitution ==
Prostitution experienced its largest growth during 1861–1865. Some historians have speculated that this growth can be attributed to a depression, and the need for women to support themselves and their families while their husbands were away at war. Other historians considered the growth of prostitution to be related to the women wanting to spread venereal disease to the opposing troops. The term "public women" was coined for the women that became prostitutes. There was moral outrage at this rising employment, and law officials classified the people they arrested as such. The word "hooker" predates the Civil War, but became popularized due to Union General Joseph Hooker's reputation of consorting with prostitutes. After the outbreak of war, the number of brothels skyrocketed. In 1864, there were 450 brothels in Washington, and over 75 brothels in nearby Alexandria, Virginia. A newspaper estimated there were 5,000 public women in the District and another 2,500 in Alexandria and Georgetown, bringing the total to 7,500 by the war's third year. However, it was the towns located just outside the camps where prostitution was most prominent. These small towns were overrun by the sex trade when army troops set up nearby camps. One soldier wrote home to his wife, "It is said that one house in every ten is a bawdy house—it is a perfect Sodom."

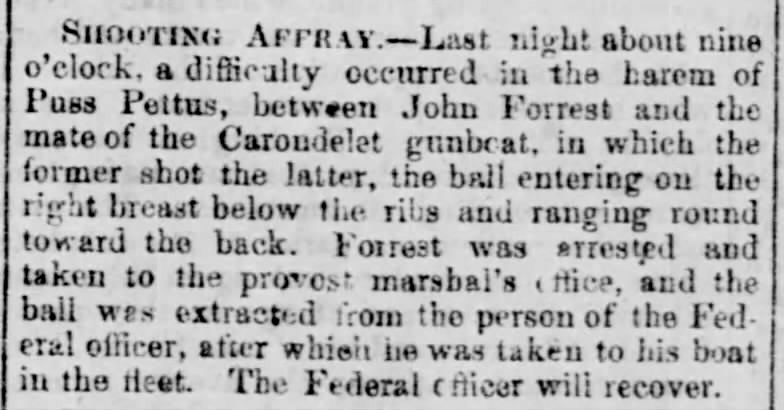
Days after the Union recaptured the city, Memphis slave trader John N. Forrest, a brother of Confederate officer Nathan Bedford Forrest, shot a mate of the USS Carondelet in the parlor of Puss Pettus's Main Street brothel ("Shooting Affray" Memphis Daily Appeal, June 13, 1862)

The most notorious area for prostitution was in Tennessee. Before the outbreak of the war, Nashville recorded 207 prostitutes; however, in 1863 reports claimed to have at least 1,500 prostitutes. The area where these prostitutes could be found was known as Smokey Row. In an infamous campaign to rid the city of the "public women", Lt. Col. George Spalding loaded the women on to the steamboat Idahoe. The women were sent to Louisville, where they were not allowed off the ship and sent further along to Cincinnati. Many of the women became sick due to lack of food and were forced to turn around and return to Nashville. Once they arrived back in Nashville, Lt. Col. Spalding created a system of registration similar to European ones. He inadvertently created the first legal system of prostitution. This is the set of regulations he set up:

- That a license be issued to each prostitute, a record of which was to be kept at this office, together with the number and street of her residence.
- That one skillful surgeon be appointed as a board of examination whose duty it was to be to examine personally, every week, each licensed prostitute, giving certificate soundness to those who were healthy and ordering into hospital those who were in the slightest degree diseased.
- That a building suitable for a hospital for the invalids was to be taken for that purpose, and that a weekly tax of fifty cents was to be levied on each prostitute for the purpose of defraying the expense of said hospital.
- That all public women found plying their vocation without a license and certificate were to be at once arrested and incarcerated in the workhouse for a period of not less than thirty days.

Prostitution experienced a large growth and spread across the North and South, and was one of the few industries to cross enemy lines throughout the duration of the war.

== Legacy ==
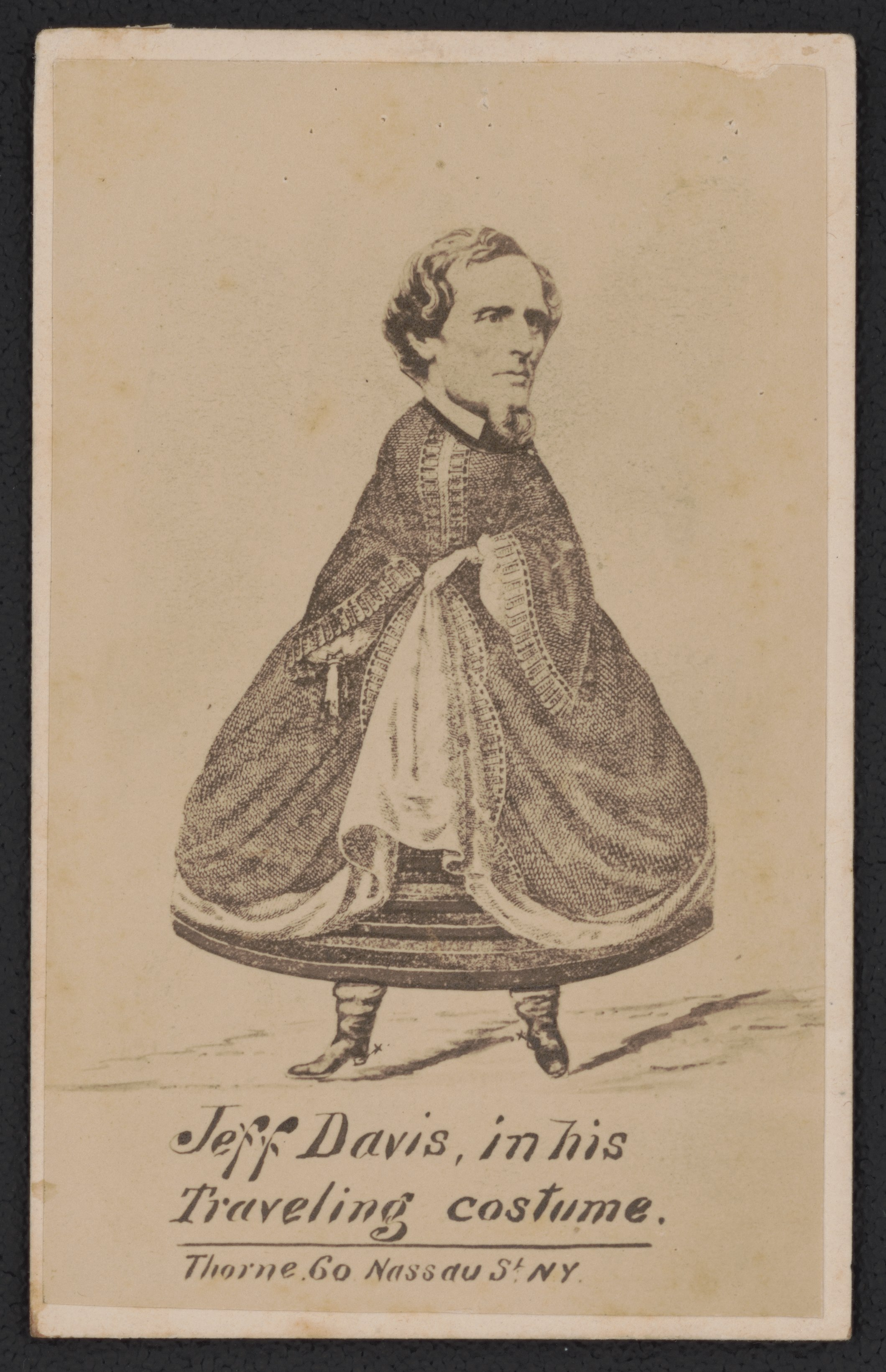
Caricature of Jefferson Davis

After the war, many Southern men felt their manhood diminished in a manner some historians dubbed a "crisis of gender"; a crisis exacerbated after Confederate president Jefferson Davis was apprehended by Union soldiers wearing his wife's shawl for warmth. The false rumor quickly spread in the North that Davis was caught during his escape while dressed as a woman. Period drawings depicting Davis in full women's dress (bonnet included) were used to ridicule the Confederacy's former president.

Women in the US were able to engage in the different societal spheres following the civil war. Typically, when women are allowed to stay post-civil war in positions that they gained in the social and political spheres, there is less chance of civil war recurring, whereas in the economic sphere, if women keep those positions, then there is a higher chance of civil war recurring.

One thing that came from the spread of pornography during the war was the rise of anti-pornography forces; in particular, the Comstock laws.

== See also ==
- American Civil War spies
- Gender history
- History of women in the United States
- Medicine in the American Civil War
- Women in the American Revolution
