= Kansas Raiders =

1950 film by Ray Enright

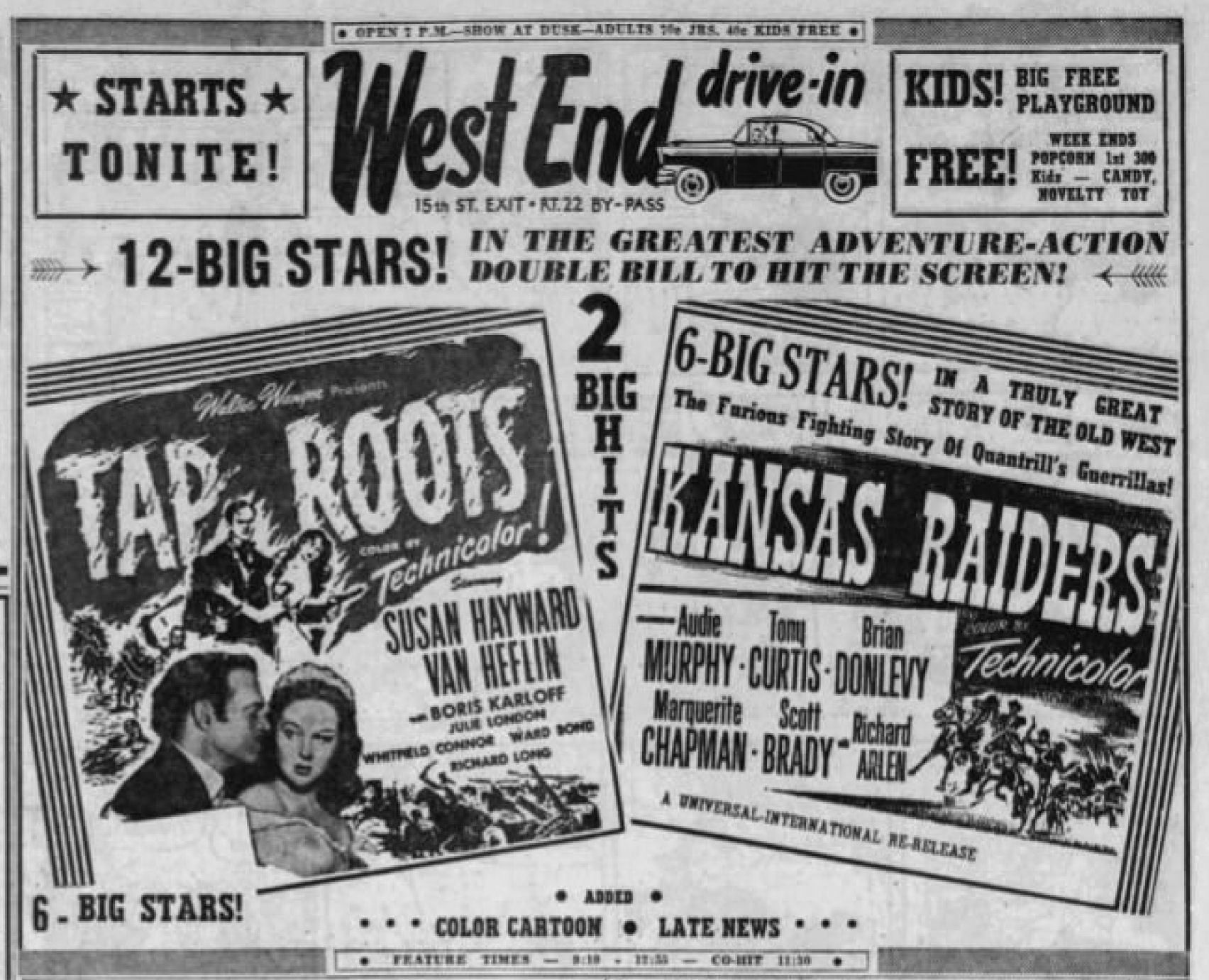
- 1956 newspaper advertisement
- Directed by: Ray Enright
- Screenplay by: Robert L. Richards
- Story by: Robert L. Richards
- Produced by: Ted Richmond
- Starring: Audie Murphy; Brian Donlevy; Marguerite Chapman; Scott Brady
- Cinematography: Irving Glassberg
- Edited by: Milton Carruth
- Color process: Technicolor
- Production company: Universal International Pictures
- Distributed by: Universal Pictures
- Release date: November 15, 1950 (United States)
- Running time: 80 minutes
- Country: United States
- Language: English
- Box office: $1.2 million (US rentals)

Kansas Raiders is a 1950 American Western film directed by Ray Enright and starring Audie Murphy, Brian Donlevy, Marguerite Chapman and Scott Brady. It is set during the American Civil War and involves Jesse James coming under the influence of William Quantrill.

== Plot ==
Jesse James and his friends—brother Frank, brothers Cole and Jim Younger and Kit Dalton—arrive in Lawrence, Kansas and are falsely accused of being members of Quantrill's Raiders. They are about to be lynched but are saved by the intervention of a Union officer.

The men are released and they join Quantrill. Jesse at first admires Quantrill but comes to question his devotion after seeing atrocities committed by Quantrill and his troops. He also falls for a woman named Kate Clarke. Events in their home state of Missouri mean that the James brothers cannot return without being prosecuted for serious crimes, so they elect to stay with Quantrill and benefit from the protection that he offers.

The raiders take part in the Lawrence Massacre, in which Jesse and his men rob their first bank. Jesse prevents the senseless murder of a helpless Union officer and kills Quantrill's second in command, Bill Anderson. When the Confederates disown Quantrill for his war crimes, most of the raiders abandon him, except for Jesse. Quantrill is blinded during an escape, and neither Jesse nor Kate can bring themselves to abandon him. When Union troops surround their hideout, they are led by the same Union officer whose life Jesse had saved. He allows them a grace period of until sunrise to surrender.

Quantrill engages in a gunfight with Union troops to afford Jesse and his group a chance to escape through the rear exit. Jesse leaves Kate and leads his friends into a life of crime. Quantrill is responsible for teaching the five men the arts of robbery, murder and notoriety.

== Cast ==
- Audie Murphy as Jesse James
- Brian Donlevy as Quantrill
- Marguerite Chapman as Kate Clarke
- Scott Brady as Bill Anderson
- Tony Curtis as Kit Dalton
- Richard Arlen as Union Captain
- Richard Long as Frank James
- James Best as Cole Younger
- John Kellogg as Red Leg leader
- Dewey Martin as James Younger
- George Chandler as Willie
- Charles Delaney as Pell
- Richard Egan as First Lieutenant
- David Bauer as Tate (as Dave Wolfe)

== Home media ==
Universal Pictures released the film on DVD in 2007 as part of its Classic Western Round-Up, Volume 1 set, a two-disc set featuring three other films (The Texas Rangers, Canyon Passage and The Lawless Breed). The same set was rereleased in 2011 as part of Universal's 4 Movie Marathon DVD series, repackaged as the Classic Western Collection. In 2014, the film was bundled in a different Universal set, Classic Westerns, 10 Movie Collection, but without the option to view subtitles.
