= Puss Pettus =

19th-century American prostitute

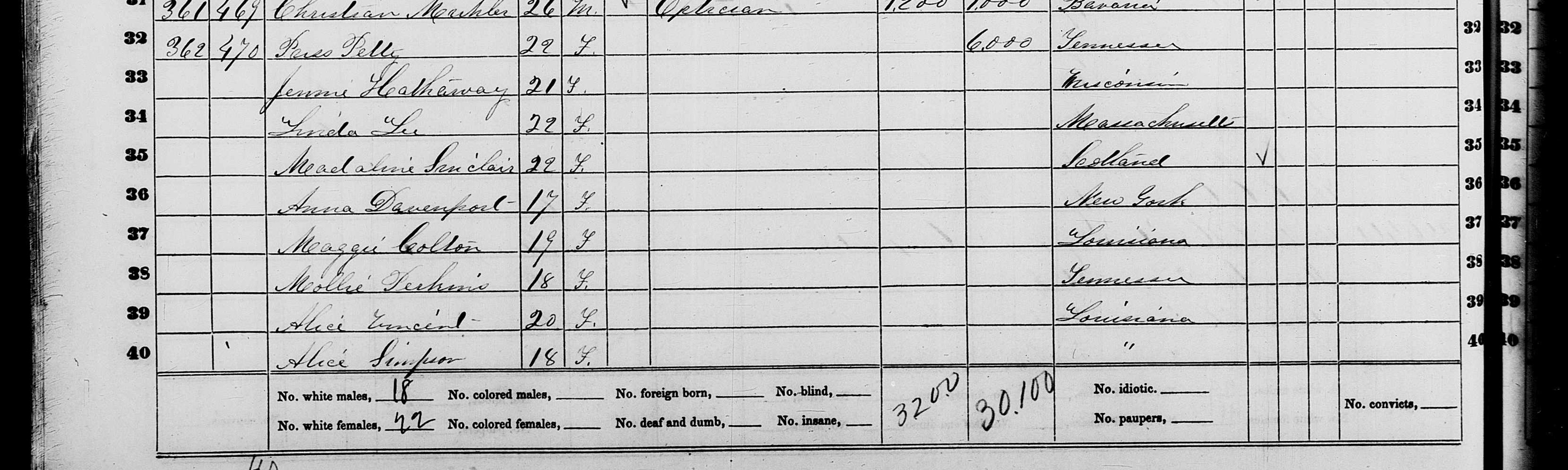
- Puss Petty's house in 1860 Memphis was occupied by several seemingly unmarried young ladies in their teens and early 20s; Petty reported owning personal property worth US$6,000 (equivalent to $215,000 in 2025)

Puss Pettus was a 19th-century American prostitute. She was a successful business owner in Tennessee, best known for running a brothel in Memphis during the American Civil War.

== Biography ==
Pettus originally worked in Nashville in the Middle Tennessee region of the state, as she was arrested there circa 1855, during regular vice sweeps. The routine was that brothel keepers were arrested at "approximately monthly intervals, fined...according to the number of prostitutes they housed, and then released...This loose system effectively taxed madams according to how many operatives they claimed."

Pettus later relocated to Memphis in West Tennessee. Perhaps one reason that Pettus was often described as "notorious" is that when Memphis brothels were policed, "in the main the keepers of brothels, not the inmates, faced charges of prostitution...Only in rare cases were the brothel operatives arrested." Pettus was arrested many times for operating what the newspapers usually called a bagnio or house of ill repute. Her place was located downtown, near the steamboat landing, close to the slave market and the major hotels. She was down the street from the Gayoso Hotel—specifically, "left down Gayoso Avenue and passing near to where a bridge crossed the bayou Gayoso, stood the brothels of Emma Piquet (or Pickett) and Puss Pettus." In November 1860, Pettus was charged with forging a slave pass, "an offense punishable by time in the penitentiary. Although found not guilty, the charge offers a tantalizing suggestion of cooperation between enslaved people and sex workers".

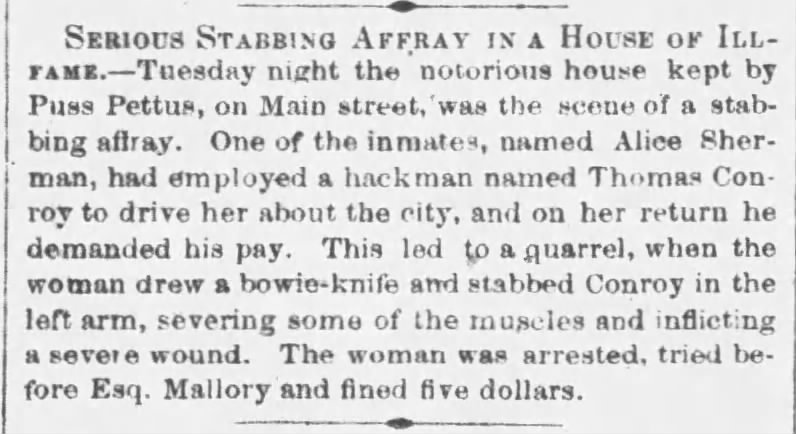
"Stabbing Affray" (Memphis Daily Avalanche, March 28, 1861)

Days after secessionist Memphis was recaptured by Union troops on June 6, 1862, Nathan Bedford Forrest's Confederate-aligned brother John N. Forrest shot a U.S. Navy master's mate named Theodore Gilmore in a parlor at Pettus' brothel. According to a history of American Civil War-era prostitution, "Less than two weeks after Union troops entered Memphis...Provost Marshal John H. Gould found it necessary to issue a special order stating, 'Lewd women are prohibited from conversing with soldiers while on duty; nor will they be allowed to walk the streets after sunset. Anyone of the class indicated who shall violate this order will be conveyed across the river and will not be allowed to return within the limits of the city.' The same day that newspapers published the order, military police escorted the infamous Puss Pettus across the river." A sense of the general character of Pettus and her work friends is conveyed by a July 1862 newspaper description of the "fast women of Memphis...The Cyprians are often young and comely, and are expensively dressed, though frequently with sober and excellent taste. They are too broad to be bound by political creed or formulas. They are universal."

One of the sex workers in Pettus' employ was named Louisa Fisher; Pettus accused Fisher of theft after Fisher after she said something to the effect of being "$350 ahead of the old cow". Pettus and Fisher's occupations were an open secret but during the court proceedings Pettus fell back on the euphemistic job description "boarding house keeper".

Pettus may have had as many as 11 children.

== See also ==
- Annie Cook – American madam (c. 1840–1878)
- Tennessee in the American Civil War
- Gender issues in the American Civil War § Prostitution

== Sources ==
- Brock, Darla (1996). "Memphis's Nymphs Du Pave: 'The Most Abandoned Women in the World'". West Tennessee Historical Society Papers. Memphis, Tennessee: West Tennessee Historical Society. ISSN 0361-6215.
- Cole, Danielle Jeannine (2007). Public Women in Public Spaces: Prostitution and Union Military Experience, 1861–1865 (M.A. thesis). University of Tennessee, Knoxville.
- ——— (2009). "'Upon the Stage of Disorder': Legalized Prostitution in Memphis and Nashville, 1863–1865". Tennessee Historical Quarterly. 68 (1): 40–65. ISSN 0040-3261. JSTOR 42628111.
- Smith, Aran Tyson (2016). The Bawdy Bluff: Prostitution in Memphis, Tennessee, 1820–1900 (Thesis). Oxford, Miss.: University of Mississippi. ID 1418.
