= Lena Angevine Warner =

American nurse and activist (1869–1948)

Lena Angevine Warner (1869–1948) was an American nurse and activist, sometimes referred to as "Tennessee's pioneer nurse". She also founded the Tennessee Nurses Association and the Tennessee Health Association and was the first superintendent of nurses at the City of Memphis Hospital.

== Early life and education ==
Warner was born in Grenada, Mississippi. Her immediate family died during the Yellow Fever epidemics of 1877 and 1878, after which she was raised by her grandmother.

Warner attended St. Mary’s Episcopal School in Memphis, Tennessee and was among the first students accepted at the Memphis Training School for Nurses (1887).

== Career and research ==
When the Spanish-American War began in 1898, President McKinley called for volunteer nurses to help support efforts in Cuba to counter the numerous viruses such as cholera, malaria, smallpox, yellow fever, and bubonic plague all spreading across the country. Warner volunteered and was named Chief Executive Nurse, making her the only female officer in the United States Army at the time.

Following the Spanish-American War, Warner was invited back to Cuba to support experiments related to Yellow Fever alongside Dr. Walter Reed and other distinguished medical staff. The team was able to determine that Yellow Fever was carried by the Aedes Aegypti mosquito.

After returning to Memphis, she founded the Tennessee Nurses Association and the Tennessee Health Association, organized Red Cross chapters, and served as the state chairperson for the Red Cross Nursing Department from 1910 to 1932.

Warner moved to Knoxville in 1916 to fight epidemics of influenza and cholera until her eventual retirement in 1946 at 79.

== Death ==
Warner is buried at Elmwood Cemetery in Memphis.
