= Lanier University =

Baptist university in Atlanta, Georgia, US

- Type: Private
- Active: 1917–1922
- Religious affiliation: Baptist
- Location: Atlanta, Georgia, United States; 33°47′29″N 84°20′56″W

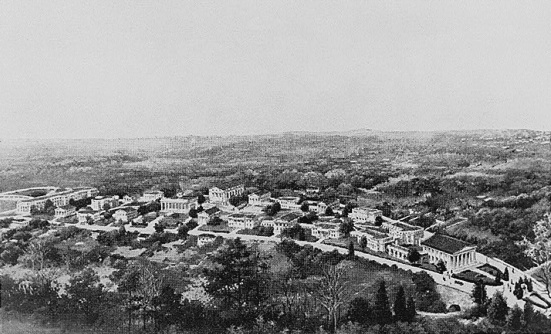
Lanier University as it was planned. Only the rightmost building, Arlington Hall, was built

Lanier University was a short-lived private university, located in today's Morningside-Lenox Park neighborhood of Atlanta, Georgia, in the United States. It was notable for its connections with the second Ku Klux Klan, which was also based in Atlanta and which owned the university for a time.

Charles Lewis Fowler, a Baptist minister, founded Lanier in 1917. He hoped for financing from Coca-Cola magnate Asa Candler but instead got backing from the Georgia Baptist Association. Lanier was to be Georgia's first co-ed Baptist college. The university was named in honor of Sidney Lanier, the "poet of the Confederacy."

== Design ==
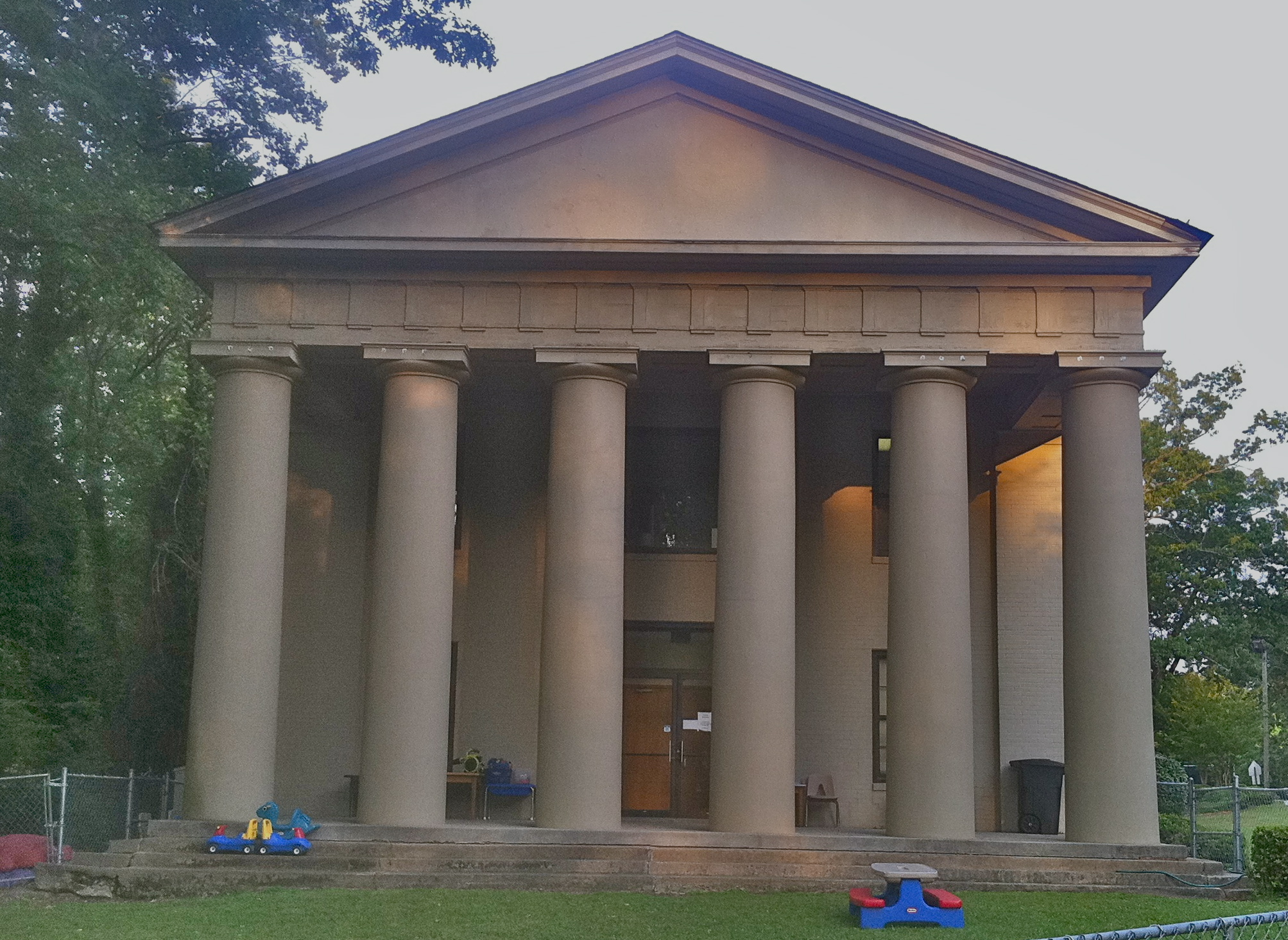
Former Arlington Hall

Architect A. Ten Eyck Brown made architectural plans for the new campus in Morningside on a crescent-shaped strip of land (see illustration). At the head of this strip, at University Drive and Spring Valley Lane, would stand a replica of the Custis-Lee Mansion in Arlington, Virginia. This was built and named Arlington Hall. The University Park subdivision was developed around the university in 1921, and University Drive is also a reminder of that time.

== Operations and demise ==
Among its faculty was William Joseph Simmons, founder and leader of the second Ku Klux Klan. Simmons was a "professor of southern history" at Lanier.

Financial problems plagued the school; in 1921, the school was sold to the Ku Klux Klan, which owned it for a year, with Nathan Bedford Forrest II (grandson of the Confederate general by the same name) as secretary and business manager. "The central idea involved in this proposition of the operation of Lanier University by the Knights of the Ku Klux Klan is to do what few universities are doing in this country, and that is to teach pure Americanism," Forrest told The New York Times. "Most of our large universities now are turning out socialists, cynics, and atheists."

Forrest predicted the Klan-run Lanier would enroll 1,000 to 2,000 students within a year. Instead, it failed in less time than that, closing on September 1, 1922. It was sold that October.

== Synagogue ==
In 1949 Congregation Shearith Israel, then in Summerhill, bought the property from the estate of Walter E. King and to use as a synagogue. During this time Summerhill was deteriorating due to the construction of the Downtown Connector freeway, and many Jews were moving from there to Morningside, where many would later join to fight the construction of the I-485 freeway through Morningside.

As of 2026, Arlington Hall is occupied by Riverstones Academy, a preschool, while the synagogue is in buildings behind it to the east.
