= Robert J. Morgan =

Confederate colonel (1826–1899)

- Born: March 25, 1826; LaGrange, Georgia, U.S.
- Died: July 23, 1899 (aged 73); Aberdeen, Mississippi, U.S.
- Resting place: Elmwood Cemetery, Memphis, Tennessee, U.S.
- Education: University of Georgia
- Occupations: Lawyer, planter
- Political party: Whig Party (before 1861); Democratic Party (after 1861)
- Spouses: Mary H. Battle; Martha F. Fort
- Children: 2 son, 1 daughter
- Relatives: Tomlinson Fort (father-in-law)

Judge Robert J. Morgan (1826–1899) was an American lawyer, planter and Confederate veteran. Born and educated in Georgia, he became a lawyer in Memphis, Tennessee, and planter in adjacent Mississippi. During the American Civil War, he served as a colonel in the infantry of the Confederate States Army from 1861 to 1863, and as Adjutant-General to Lieutenant-General Leonidas Polk in 1863–1864. He served as Chancellor on the Chancery Court of Shelby County, Tennessee, from 1870 to 1878.

== Early life ==
Robert J. Morgan was born on March 25, 1826, in LaGrange, Georgia. His father, John E. Morgan, was a planter, banker, merchant, and Confederate official during the American Civil War. His mother, Mary T. Brown, was the niece of Jarrell Beasley, who served in the Georgia Legislature. Morgan was of English descent on his paternal side.

Morgan graduated from the University of Georgia in 1847. He served as a legal clerk to Bull & Ferrell, and he was admitted to the bar in 1849.

== Career ==
Morgan was a partner in Morgan & Ferrell, a law firm in LaGrange, from 1849 to 1859. He moved to Memphis, where he practised the law and became a planter in adjacent Mississippi.

As a Whig, Morgan was opposed to secession until 1861, when he joined the Democratic Party. During the American Civil War, Morgan served in the Confederate States Army. He was the founder of the 36th Tennessee Infantry Regiment in Chattanooga, Tennessee, in 1861, and served as its Colonel until 1863. He was stationed in Cumberland Gap and fought in Tennessee, Georgia and Kentucky. He took part in the Battle of Murfreesboro and the Battle of Chickamauga. From 1863 to 1864, he was Adjutant-General to Lieutenant-General Leonidas Polk, up until Polk's death. He then served in the Confederate States War Department until 1865, when he was paroled in Atlanta, Georgia.

Morgan returned to legal practise in Memphis in 1865. He served as city attorney for Memphis from 1867 to 1870. He served as Chancellor on the Chancery Court of Shelby County, Tennessee, from 1870 to 1878. He retired in 1878 and returned to his private legal practise.

Morgan gave a speech at the founding ceremony of Vanderbilt University in Nashville, Tennessee, in 1874. Meanwhile, his name was suggested as a possible candidate for the Tennessee gubernatorial race, but he continued to serve as Chancellor until 1878.

When Swami Vivekananda visited Nashville to give a lecture, Morgan introduced him by saying to the crowd that "European Americans and Indians are both members of the "Aryan" race." (sic)

== Personal life ==
Morgan married Mary H. Battle, the daughter of Dr. Andrews Battle, in 1851. After she died in 1852, he married Martha F. Fort, the daughter of Congressman Tomlinson Fort and a cousin of Colonel James Fannin. They had two sons, Tomlinson Fort Morgan (died as an infant) and John E. Morgan; and daughter, Mary Louisa "Lou" Morgan, who was first married to John A. Keightley. They divorced and she was remarried 30 May 1892 to Col. Terry White Witt.

== Death ==
Morgan died on July 23, 1899, in Aberdeen, Mississippi. He was buried at Elmwood Cemetery in Memphis, Tennessee.
