= Nathan Bedford Forrest III =

United States Army Air Forces general (1905–1943)

- Brigadier General Nathan Bedford Forrest III
- Born: Nathan Bedford Forrest III; April 6, 1905; Memphis, Tennessee, U.S.
- Died: June 13, 1943 (aged 38); Kiel, Nazi Germany
- Burial place: Arlington National Cemetery
- Relatives: Nathan Bedford Forrest II (father); Mary Forrest Bradley (aunt); Nathan Bedford Forrest (great-grandfather)
- Military career
- Allegiance: United States
- Branch: United States Army Air Corps; United States Army Air Forces
- Service years: 1928–1943
- Rank: Brigadier General
- Units: Second Air Force; Eighth Air Force
- Conflicts: World War II †
- Awards: Distinguished Service Cross; Purple Heart

Nathan Bedford Forrest III (April 6, 1905 – June 13, 1943) was an American brigadier general of the United States Army Air Forces who was the first American general to be killed in action in the European Theater of World War II. Forrest was a great-grandson of Confederate general Nathan Bedford Forrest and an early officer of the United States Army Air Corps in 1929. Forrest was killed in action when his plane was shot down during a raid over Nazi Germany in June 1943.

== Early life and education ==
Forrest at West Point in 1928.

Nathan Bedford Forrest III was born on April 6, 1905 in Memphis, Tennessee, the son of Nathan Bedford Forrest II and Mattie Patterson (Patton). His paternal great-grandfather was Nathan Bedford Forrest, the famed Confederate general and leader of the Ku Klux Klan. On November 22, 1930, he married Frances Brassler. According to the Arlington National Cemetery website, he did not have any children, making him the final male Forrest in his great-grandfather's legitimate direct line.

== Career ==
Forrest graduated from West Point in 1928 and was commissioned a second lieutenant in the cavalry of the United States Army. In 1929, he transferred to the Air Corps, gaining rank rapidly and graduating from the Air Corps Tactical School in December 1939. Promoted to brigadier general in 1942, Forrest was serving as chief of staff of the Second Air Force when he flew missions as an observer with the Eighth Air Force in England.

== Death ==
On June 13, 1943, Forrest was reported missing in action while leading a bombing raid on the German submarine yards at Kiel when his B-17 Flying Fortress was shot down by anti-aircraft fire. The other squadron members reported seeing parachutes and hoped the general had survived. However, on September 23, 1943, Forrest's corpse washed up near a seaplane base on the island of Rügen in Germany. He was buried on September 28, 1943, in a small cemetery near Wiek.

His family was presented his Distinguished Service Cross, which he was awarded posthumously for staying at the controls of his B-17 bomber while his crew bailed out. The plane exploded before Forrest could bail out. By the time the Seenotdienst (the German air-sea rescue) arrived, only one of the crew was still alive in the water.

=== Distinguished Service Cross citation ===
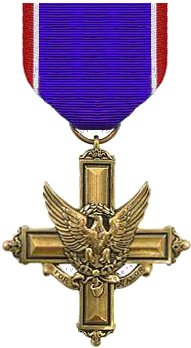

The President of the United States of America, authorized by Act of Congress July 9, 1918, takes pleasure in presenting the Distinguished Service Cross to Brigadier General Nathan Bedford Forrest, III (ASN: 0-17124), United States Army Air Forces, for extraordinary heroism in connection with military operations against an armed enemy while serving as Chief of Staff for the SECOND Air Force and an Observer in a B-17 Heavy Bomber of the EIGHTH Air Force, while participating in a bombing mission on 13 June 1943, against enemy ground targets in the European Theater of Operations. While in command of a bomber division of an operational bombing mission against a vital military target, the formation was subjected to heavy antiaircraft fire and enemy aircraft attacks, during which a number of the planes in the division were shot down, and the plane in which General Forrest was flying was damaged before reaching the target. In the face of the strongest opposition yet encountered on a bombing mission, and with complete disregard for personal safety, General Forrest led his command to the target and accomplished his mission from which he did not return. His leadership, skill, and extraordinary heroism on this occasion were an inspiration to all officers and men of the Air Force in this theater, and reflect the highest credit upon himself and the Armed Forces of the United States. General Forrest has been officially reported as missing in action.

== Legacy ==
In 1947, two years after the war ended, his widow requested that he be returned to the United States and buried in Arlington National Cemetery. He was buried in Section 11 at Arlington on November 15, 1949.

== Dates of rank ==
- June 9, 1928 second lieutenant
- February 4, 1934, first lieutenant
- June 9, 1938, captain
- January 31, 1941, major
- January 5, 1942, lieutenant colonel
- March 1, 1942, colonel
- November 2, 1942, brigadier general

== In popular culture ==
Alternate history novelist Harry Turtledove makes Forrest III a significant character in the Southern Victory series, and a minor character in the standalone novel Joe Steele. The Southern Victory version is an officer of a still-extant Confederacy in the 1940s.

== See also ==
- List of people who disappeared mysteriously at sea
- Thomas Jonathan Jackson Christian Jr., another great-grandson of a notable Confederate general who was a high-ranking USAAF pilot killed in action in the ETO in World War II
