= Mae Glover =

American country blues singer (1906–1985)

- Also known as: Lillie Mae Glover, Sister Jones, Big Sister, Jessie Brown, Sally Sad, Mae Muff, Side Wheel Sally Duffie, Bessie Jones, May Armstrong, Big Memphis Ma Rainey
- Born: Lillie Mary Hardison; September 9, 1906; Columbia, Tennessee, United States
- Died: March 27, 1985 (aged 78) Iuka, Mississippi, United States
- Genres: Country blues
- Occupation: Singer
- Instrument: Vocals
- Years active: 1920s–1950s
- Labels: Various including Gennett, Supertone, Sun

Mae Glover (September 9, 1906 – March 27, 1985) was an American country blues singer. Over a lengthy career she recorded under various pseudonyms and performed regularly in her adopted hometown, earning her the nickname of "the Mother of Beale Street."

== Early life ==
She was born Lillie Mary Hardison in Columbia, Tennessee, United States, and relocated with her family to Nashville, Tennessee as a young child. In 1920, at the age of 13, she ran away to join the Tom Simpson Traveling Medicine Show. In 1982, Glover explained in an interview that "I wanted to sing the blues, but my father was a pastor and the blues were looked on in those days, as dirty music. And for me to stay in Nashville would have been a disgrace for my family". Glover undertook travel with various tent and sideshows including, the Rabbit Foot Minstrels, the Bronze Mannequins, the Vampin' Baby Show, the Georgia Minstrels, Harlem in Havana, and Nina Benson's Medicine Show, appearing as either a blues singer or comedian. By 1928, she had stopped roaming and settled down in Memphis, Tennessee, married a cook, Willie Glover, and became a regular performer on Beale Street, where she ultimately earned the sobriquet, "the Mother of Beale Street."

== Performing career ==
Her first recordings took place in April 1927, when under the name May Armstrong, she waxed six numbers in Memphis, including "Joe Boy Blues" and "Nobody Can Take", for the Gennett label. In August the same year, she recorded six sides billed as Side Wheel Sally Duffie. On July 29, 1929, and on this occasion in Richmond, Indiana, she recorded four songs billed as simply Mae Glover. In July 1929, Glover used the pianist John Byrd as accompaniment, and Byrd himself cut two religious titles for Gennett. They were credited to Rev. George Jones and Congregation. It is likely that the 'Sister Jones' appearing on the recording is Mae Glover. A number from that time which was credited to Glover was the innuendo-laden, "Gas Man Blues". In addition, Glover moved in to the dirty blues sphere again with "Shake It Daddy", with the lyrics: "He shakes it in the morning, he shakes it at midnight, Keep on shakin' it, daddy, 'til you know you're shakin' it right, Lord, the way you shake it'll make me lose my appetite, The way you shake it will make me lose my appetite". On February 24, 1931, Glover employed the pianist Charles O'Neil and trumpet player James Parker, in recording "Forty Four Blues", released on both Supertone and Champion. Another release of that song entitled "Big Gun Blues", was issued on Varsity, using the name of Mae Muff.

Glover also gave live performances across Memphis at various locations including the Peabody Hotel, The Midnight Rambles, Coca-Cola Club, Citizens Club, Hotel Improvement, and the Manhattan Club. Following the death of Glover's idol, Ma Rainey in December 1939, Glover often performed billed as Ma Rainey II (or some variation thereof). She continued to work regularly on stage, but did not record again until 1953, when she used the name "Big Memphis Ma Rainey", in waxing two sides for Sun Records. It is thought that over the years she recorded under several different names, including Lillie Mae Glover, Sister Jones, Big Sister, Jessie Brown, Sally Sad, Mae Muff, Side Wheel Sally Duffie, Bessie Jones, May Armstrong, and Big Memphis Ma Rainey.

She reappeared in the 1970s, singing both solo and with the traveling Memphis Blues Caravan. She was also involved in the recording of an album, Memories of Beale Street: Prince Gabe and the Millionaires with the Original Memphis Sound. Around this time a local restaurateur hired Glover to sing with the Blues Alley All Stars. She became a favorite at this time, due to her regaling both lusty songs and risque banter.

== Awards ==
In 1977, Glover received the Beale Street Music Festival Award, got 'Tennessee's Outstanding Achievement Award' two years later, and was inducted into the Hall of Fame of Music and Entertainment in Chicago in 1981.

== Later life and death ==
She underwent heart surgery but, despite failing health, continued to perform. She required further treatment in hospital and upon leaving those premises in December 1984, she traveled to Iuka, Mississippi, to reside with a friend.

Glover died in Tishomingo County Hospital, Iuka, Mississippi, on March 27, 1985, at the age of 76. She left no immediate family. Glover was accorded an obituary in the Los Angeles Times. She was honored with a procession down Beale Street in Memphis, Tennessee. The funeral procession, with a horse-drawn carriage carrying the casket, was led by Prince Gabe and the Famous Millionaires, a Memphis blues band. About 1,000 spectators were drawn to the funeral.

She was interred in at Elmwood Cemetery, Memphis, Tennessee. The inscription on her headstone reads: "I don't care what Mr. Crump don’t allow, I’m gonna barrelhouse anyhow".

== Discography ==
=== Compilation albums ===
Year	Title	Record label
1987	Lillian Glinn & Mae Glover	Story of the Blues
1993	Completed Recorded Works (1927–1931)	Document Records
