= Clara Robertson =

American clairvoyant (1857–1883)

Clara Robertson Zent
- Born: Clara Robertson unknown 1857; Bolivar, Tennessee
- Died: 1883 (aged 25–26); Arkansas
- Resting place: Elmwood Cemetery (Memphis, Tennessee)
- Occupation: Spiritual Medium
- Known for: Discovering the ghost of "Pink Lizzie"
- Spouse: John Zent
- Parents: JR Robertson; Mary Robertson

Clara Robertson Zent (1857 – 1883) was a 19th century clairvoyant and medium. Robertson came to public attention in 1871 when the account of the schoolgirl in Memphis, Tennessee who had seen a ghost became sensationalized in local and national papers. The school, hurt in part by the scandal, closed in 1871. Robertson went on to become a performing clairvoyant and medium in local theaters. She appeared on stage, and offered séances and mediumship services until she died, aged 25, in 1883.

== Early life and education ==
Clara Robertson was born in Hardeman County, Tennessee in 1857. She was the daughter of Joseph R. Robertson and Mary Craig Robertson. Her father was a Methodist preacher and a lawyer.

The family moved from Bolivar, Tennessee to DeSoto Street in Memphis in 1868, when Clara was 11. She attended the Linden School for two years.

In the fall of 1870, she started at the Brinkley Female College, a new private girls’ school in Memphis opened in 1868 on South Fifth Street. Robertson came to public attention while a student at Brinkley Female College when she reported seeing a ghost in February 1871. The ghostly apparition of a little girl of approximately eight appeared to Clara multiple times, and was reported widely in the local press before becoming a national sensation. Other girls also reported seeing the ghost. The Daily Memphis Avalanche described the ghost as having "a sad expression" and wearing a "tattered dress of faded pink, which was partly covered in a green and slimy mould." Accounts of the period say that the pink-clad apparition spoke to Clara and revealed its name as Lizzie Davie, leading to the moniker “Pink Lizzie.” Town folk thought the ghost was the daughter of Colonial Davie who had built the Brinkley mansion, which housed the school.

Roberston refused to go back to school after seeing the ghost, and Brinkley Female College, hurt in part by the scandal, closed in 1871. Robertson didn't continue her schooling but instead became a professional spiritual medium, with her father as a promoter and agent, from 1871-1876.

== Career ==
In March 1871, weeks after the first ghostly sighting, the Memphis Public Ledger wrote that the Daily Memphis Avalanche's “ghost reporter” declared Clara Robertson to be a “full-fledged writing medium and clairvoyant,” and that “she sees other spirits…with eyes closed while she is in a state of trance.”

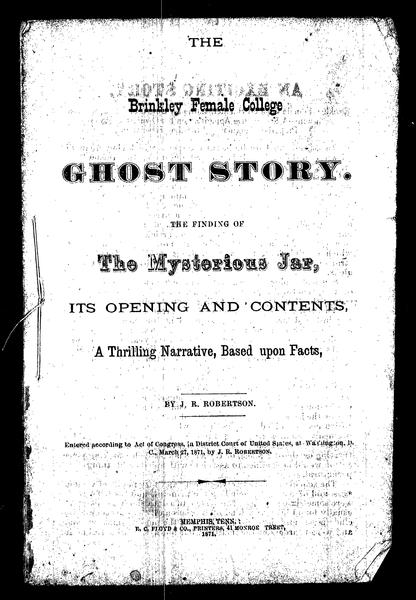
The Brinkley Female College ghost story [electronic resource] : the finding of the mysterious jar, its opening and contents ; a thrilling narrative, based upon facts

Robertson's father published a compilation of the story in May 1871 entitled The Brinkley Female College GHOST STORY: The Finding of The Mysterious Jar, its opening and contents. A Thrilling Narrative, Based Upon Facts. He offered the pamphlets for sale from his office at 53 Union Street, and they were also carried by newsstands and book stores in the city, for 30¢ a piece. The pamphlet, and her onstage appearances, led to her local and national notoriety as a spiritualist for a number of years.

Robertson appeared on stage on 1 May 1871 at the Greenlaw Opera House in a trance state. Admission cost 75¢. Robertston also appeared on stage on 18 October 1871 at the Assembly Hall, with the "medium detective" Professor Von Vleck in an onstage battle, in a format popular in the 19th century, in which one performer attempted to debunk the supernatural claims of the other.

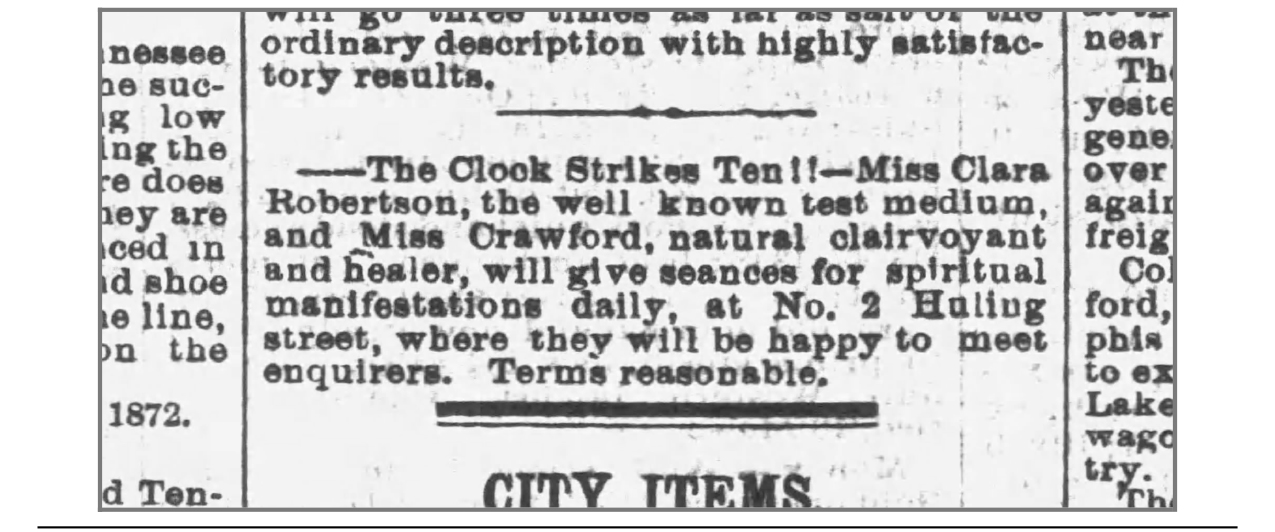
An advertisement for Clara's mediumship services in an 1872 newspaper

Clara also offered séances and mediumship services both independently and with a “natural clairvoyant and healer" Miss Crawford at No 2 Huling Street in downtown Memphis. These services were advertised in the Daily Memphis Avalanche.

== Personal life and death ==
In 1876, Robertson met and married widower John Zent, a man of modest means and 33 years her senior. In 1877, the couple had a son, David. Her husband sold lumber and worked various odd jobs and the couple and their son shared a tenement in the Market Street Slums in Pinch District, Memphis.No

Clara died in 1883 of consumption, while visiting her father, in Wittsburg, Arkansas. She was 25 or 26. She is buried in Elmwood Cemetery with her husband, their son, and her husband’s first wife.
