= Robert F. Looney =

American military officer (1824–1899)

Robert F. Looney (August 5, 1824 – November 19, 1899) was an American soldier, lawyer, and businessman. Elected colonel of the 38th Tennessee Regiment, Looney served in the Confederate Army during the American Civil War, fighting in the battle of Shiloh. After the war, Looney worked on the preservation commission for the Shiloh National Military Park, which had been established by Congress in December 1894.

== Early life and prewar career ==
One of the twelve children of Abram and Elizabeth Looney, Robert Fain Looney was born in Maury County, Tennessee in 1824. In 1845, Looney was admitted to the bar and began practicing law in Columbia, Tennessee. Looney married Louisa M. Crofford in 1847 and the couple remained in Columbia until 1852, when they moved to Memphis. This marriage produced nine children.

== Civil War ==
Despite his antebellum position as a Henry Clay Whig opposed to secession, Looney raised the 38th Tennessee regiment and led it through two years of campaigns in Tennessee and Georgia. Looney's service at the battle of Shiloh was especially notable. Raging in southwestern Tennessee from the dawn of April 6 through April 7, 1862, the battle of Shiloh christened the Western theater and resulted in more battle mortalities in two days than in all previous American wars combined. During this crucial conflict, Looney led a charge that captured at least 1000 prisoners, including Union General Benjamin M. Prentiss. Moreover, in the mid-afternoon of April 7, Looney led the 38th Tennessee on the final charge before the Confederate retreat.

Looney and his regiment fought in numerous other engagements, including Perrysville, Murfreesboro, Farmington, and Corinth. On April 10, 1863, Looney was captured by Union troops outside of Wythe, Tennessee, where he was on an apparent Confederate recruiting mission. Looney returned to active combat until he surrendered at Oxford, Mississippi in 1865.

== Postwar life and the Shiloh National Military Park ==
After the war, Looney returned to his Memphis law office, where he practiced until 1870. During the last few decades of the nineteenth century, Robert F. Looney was an active member of the Democratic Party, delivering endorsement speeches on behalf of party candidates. Although Looney himself never ran for public office, he was a delegate to the Chicago National Democratic Convention in 1884, which nominated Cleveland for the presidency.

From 1895 until his death in 1899, Looney served on the commission for the Shiloh National Military Park, which had been established by Congress on December 27, 1894. Appointed by Secretary of War Daniel S. Lamont to represent the Army of Mississippi, Looney worked alongside fellow ex-Confederate Captain James W. Irwin as well as former adversaries, including Union Colonel Cornelius Cadle, General Don Carlos Buell, and Major David W. Reed. This commission convened on April 2, 1895 and worked to mark where the major skirmishes occurred on the battlefield and to construct monuments in memory of both the Union and Confederate soldiers.

On November 19, 1899, Looney died in his Memphis home. He is buried in Elmwood Cemetery in Memphis, Tennessee.
