= Ron Wilson (American politician) =

American politician, convicted of fraud

Ronald Gene Wilson

Member of the Anderson County Council from District 6
- In office 2007–2010
- Succeeded by: Ken Waters

68th Commander-in-Chief of the Sons of Confederate Veterans
- In office 2002–2004
- Preceded by: Edwin L. Deason
- Succeeded by: Denne A. Sweeney

Personal details
- Born: 1943 (age 82–83) Tennessee, U.S.
- Party: Republican
- Spouse: Cassandra Kendall
- Occupation: Businessman, politician
- Criminal information
- Criminal information
- Status: Sentence commuted December 12, 2024, by President Joe Biden
- Conviction: Fraud
- Penalty: Served to 20 years of prison; commuted

Ronald Gene "Ron" Wilson (born 1943) is an American businessman convicted of his role in a $90 million Ponzi scheme in 2012. He was a member of the Anderson County Council from 2006 to 2010. Prior to this he served as the 68th Commander-in-Chief of the Sons of Confederate Veterans from 2002 to 2004.

== Sons of Confederate Veterans ==
Wilson served as Commander-in-Chief of the Sons of Confederate Veterans from 2002 to 2004. During that time, he disparaged and limited the participation of those within the Sons of Confederate Veterans leadership that he and others termed "moderates", and worked to more closely ally the group with secessionist advocates and white supremacists, including Kirk D. Lyons, Boyd Cathey, and others, and also with groups like the avowedly secessionist League of the South.

== Political career ==
Wilson ran unsuccessfully in 2004 for a seat in the South Carolina Senate representing Anderson County. In 2006 was elected as the Republican member for District 6 in the Anderson County Council. Wilson also served on the South Carolina Board of Education.

== Investment scandal ==
On November 13, 2012, Wilson was sentenced to almost 20 years in prison for operating a "Ponzi Scheme" from 2001 to 2012 that swindled investors of almost $90,000,000. In the scheme, he convinced retirees, friends, business associates, fellow members of the SCV and others to take cash from retirement accounts and insurance policies, as well as more liquid cash, and invest in his silver investment business, Atlantic Bullion & Coin, Inc. He promised he would monitor "key indicators", invest accordingly, and rake in large profits. He never bought silver for most of his clients, telling them that the silver was in a Delaware depository. (The depository had never heard of Wilson.) As with all Ponzi schemes, new invested money was instead used to pay earlier investors and keep the scheme alive. Besides time served, his sentence requires restitution of $57,401,009. A web site has been set up to assist victims of the Wilson scheme in making claims, as well as providing news and information. Several investors who received unearned profits were sued to retrieve the money.

In 2014, Wilson received an additional six months on his prison sentence due to attempts to hide assets that involved his brother and ex-wife, as reported by Matthew Cox to the United States Secret Service. In 2021, he was removed to a halfway house, then to home confinement. He was to remain on probation until 2029.

On December 12, 2024, Wilson was commuted by President Joe Biden. Thus, ending his sentence on December 22, 2024.

== See also ==
- List of commanders-in-chief of the Sons of Confederate Veterans

Non-profit organization positions
Preceded by Edwin L. Deason	Commander-in-Chief of the Sons of Confederate Veterans; 2002–2004	Succeeded by Denne A. Sweeney
Political offices
Unknown	Member of the Anderson County Council from District 6; 2007–2010	Succeeded by Ken Waters
