= List of members of the Sons of Confederate Veterans =

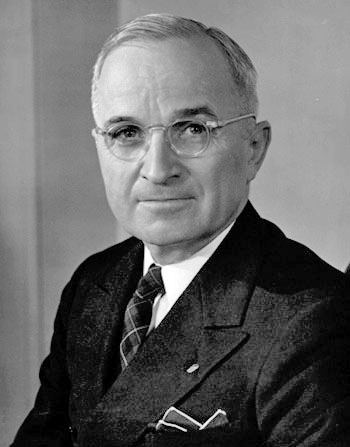
President Harry Truman

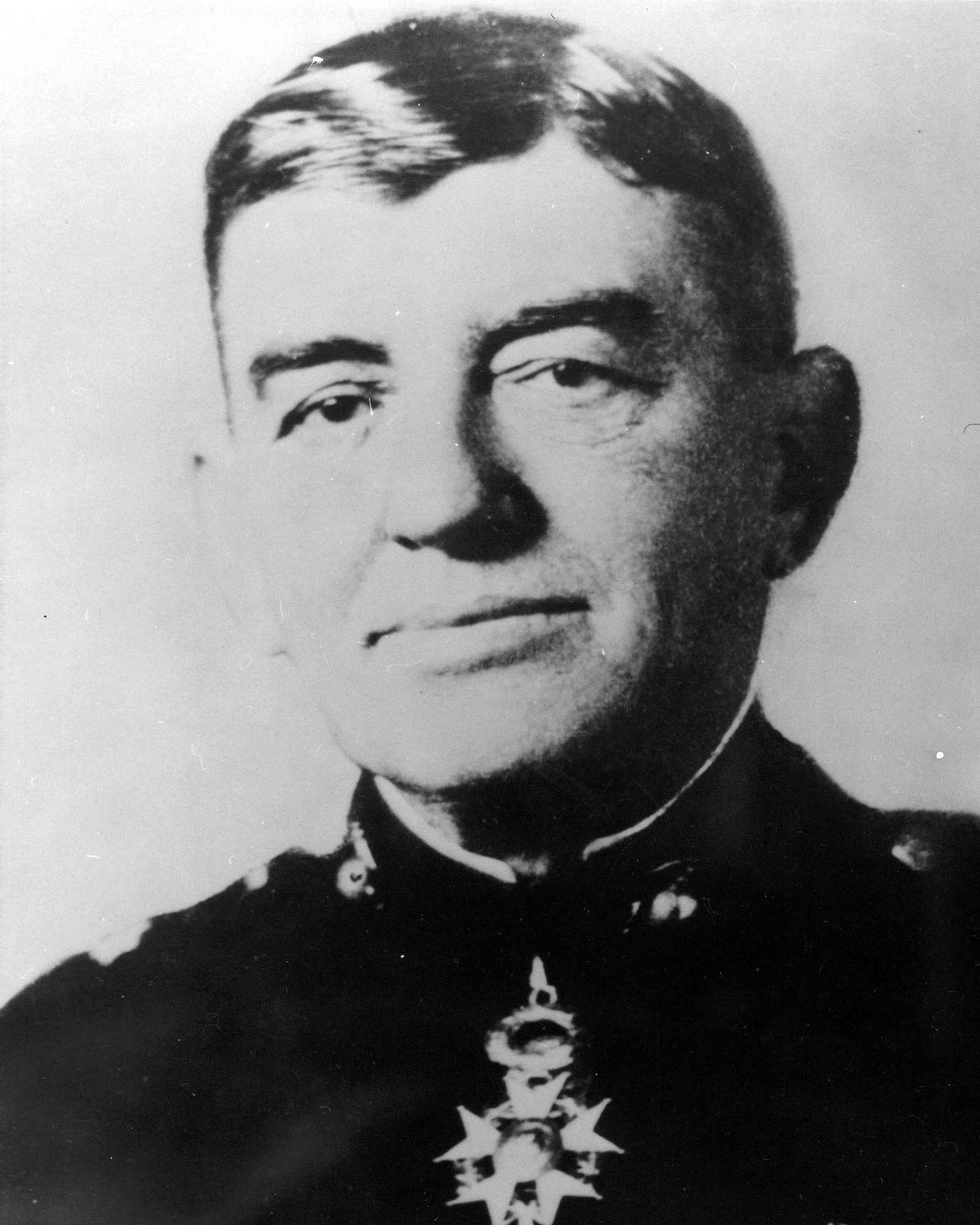
Lieutenant General John Lejeune

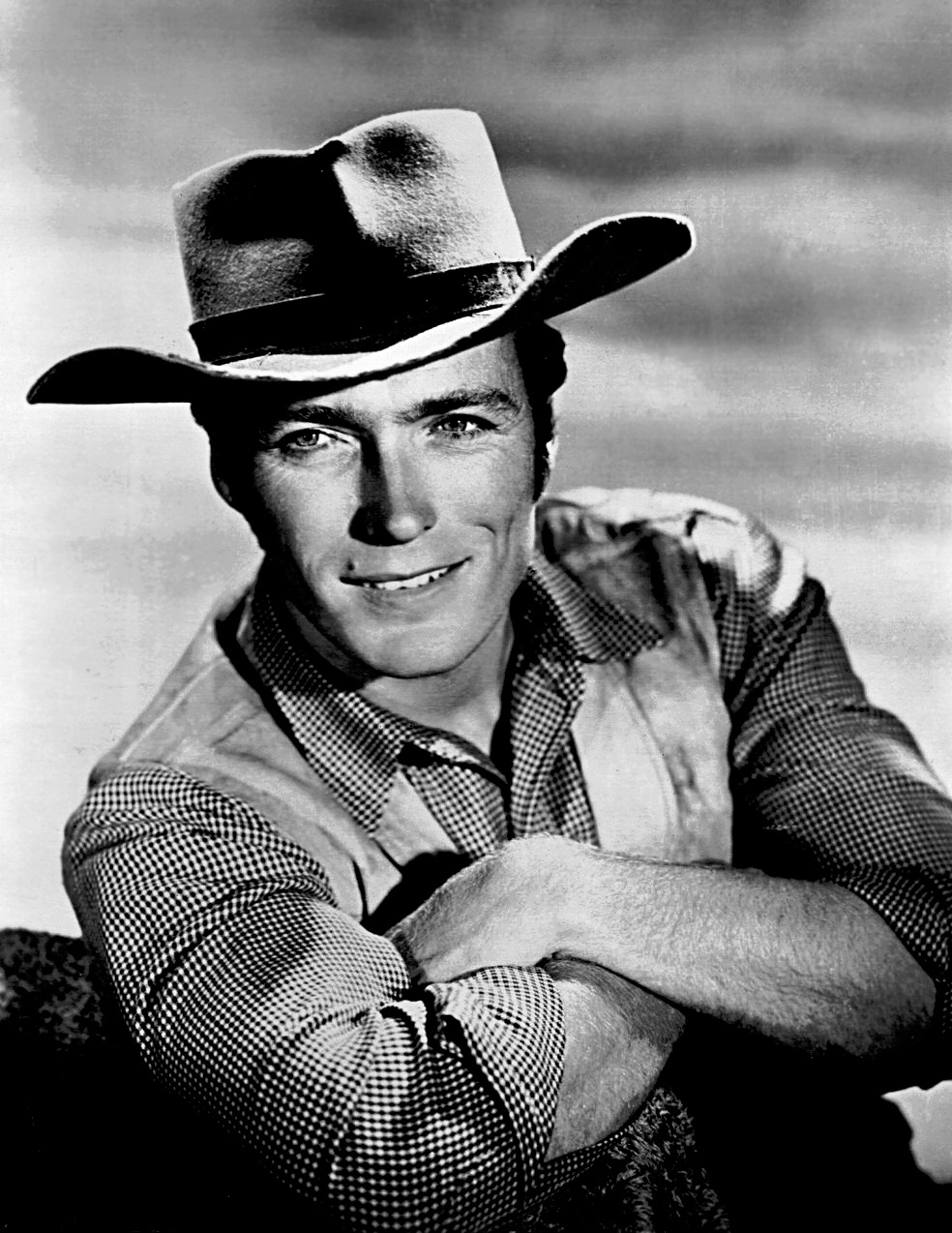
Academy Award winner Clint Eastwood

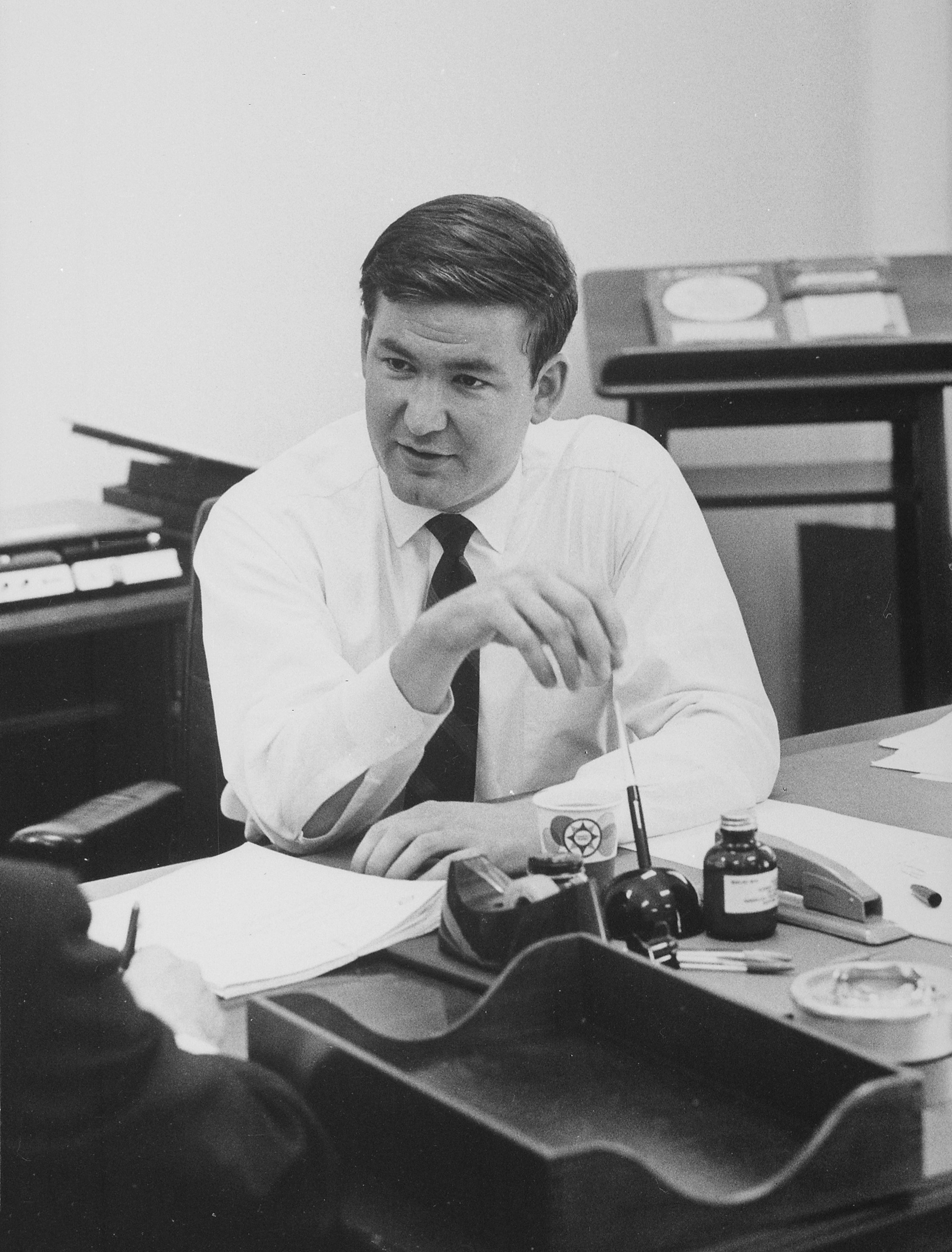
Journalist, writer, and media consultant Pat Buchanan

Notable members of the Sons of Confederate Veterans have included:

- Trace Adkins (born 1962), country singer-songwriter
- Ellis Arnall (1907–1992), Georgia governor
- W. Tate Brady (1870–1925), merchant, politician, Ku Klux Klan member, and a "founder" of Tulsa, Oklahoma.
- Phil Bryant (born 1954), Mississippi governor
- Pat Buchanan (born 1938), journalist, writer, media consultant, and U.S. presidential candidate
- Frank Buckles (1901–2011), United States Army corporal and the last surviving American military veteran of World War I
- R. Gregg Cherry (1891–1957), North Carolina governor
- John E. Courson (born 1944), South Carolina state senator
- Sam Currin, United States Attorney for Eastern North Carolina and judge on the North Carolina Superior Court
- Fred Henry Davis (1894–1937), lawyer and judge who served in several elected offices in Florida
- Bobby DeLaughter (born 1958), Mississippi state prosecutor, judge, and author
- Clint Eastwood (born 1930), film actor, director, producer, composer, pianist, and politician
- H. K. Edgerton (1948–2026), African-American activist for Southern heritage
- Charles R. Farnsley (1907–1990), U.S. representative from Kentucky
- Orval Faubus (1910–1994), Arkansas governor
- Nathan Bedford Forrest II (1871–1931), businessman and activist who served as the 19th Commander-in-Chief of the Sons of Confederate Veterans
- MacDonald Gallion (1913–2007), Alabama attorney general
- Gordon Gunter (1909–1998), marine biologist and fisheries scientist
- Dorsey B. Hardeman (1902–1992), Texas state senator
- Harry B. Hawes (1869–1947), U.S. senator from Missouri
- Jesse Helms (1921–2008), U.S. senator from North Carolina and U.S. presidential candidate
- Douglas Selph Henry Jr. (1926–2017), member of the Tennessee General Assembly, serving in both the House and Senate
- Brandon Herrera (born 1995), YouTuber and gun rights activist
- James Hylton (1934–2018), race car driver
- John Karl "Jack" Kershaw Nashville, Tennessee attorney, sculptor, and co-founder of the League of the South.
- Donald Livingston, Emory University professor and co-founder of the Abbeville Institute
- Trent Lott (born 1941), U.S. senator from Mississippi
- Creighton Lovelace (born 1981), pastor of Danieltown Baptist Church in Forest City, North Carolina
- Loy Mauch (born 1952), member of the Arkansas House of Representatives
- Robert Stacy McCain (born 1959), journalist, writer, and blogger
- William David McCain (1907–1993), archivist and college president
- Glenn F. McConnell (born 1947), president of the College of Charleston and the 89th lieutenant governor of South Carolina
- Arieh O'Sullivan (born 1961), former Israeli soldier, author, journalist, and defense correspondent
- Arthur Ravenel Jr. (1927-2023), businessman and a Republican politician from Charleston, South Carolina
- Charley Reese (1937–2013), newspaper columnist
- Absalom Willis Robertson (1887–1971), U.S. senator from Virginia, father of televangelist Pat Robertson
- Lloyd M. Robinette (1881–1951), Virginia lawyer and politician
- Floyd Spence (1928–2001), U.S. representative from South Carolina,
- Walbrook D. Swank (1910–2008), World War II officer and a noted historical author
- Strom Thurmond (1902–2003), governor, U.S. senator from South Carolina, and U.S. presidential candidate
- Harry S. Truman (1884–1972), 33rd president of the United States
- William M. Tuck (1896–1983), governor and U.S. representative from Virginia
- Danny Verdin (born 1964), South Carolina state senator
- Bradley Walker (1877–1951), Nashville attorney and athlete
- Alexander W. Weddell (1876–1948), diplomat
- Robert Wilkie (born 1962), United States Secretary of Veterans Affairs
- Guinn Williams (1871–1948), U.S. representative from Texas
- Joe Wilson (born 1947), U.S. representative from South Carolina
- Ron Wilson (born 1943), businessman convicted of his role in a $90 million Ponzi scheme in 2012, 68th Commander-in-Chief of the Sons of Confederate Veterans
- Nelson W. Winbush (born 1929), African-American educator
- Scott Wyatt (born 1969), politician
