= Sarah Palmer Young =

Sarah A. Graham Palmer Young
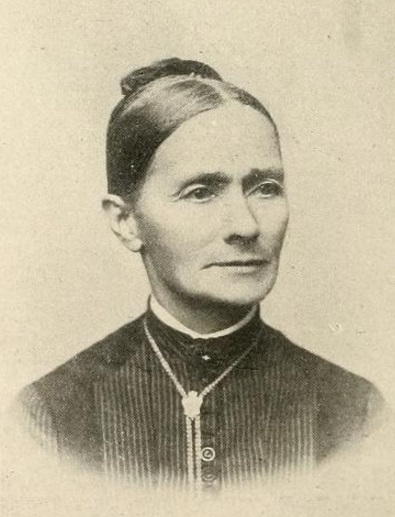
- Born: Sarah A. Graham; August 19, 1830; Ithaca, New York, US
- Died: April 6, 1908 (aged 77); Des Moines, Iowa, US
- Other names: "Aunt Becky"
- Occupation: Nurse

Sarah Graham Palmer Young (August 19, 1830 - April 6, 1908) worked as a regimental nurse during the American Civil War. In 1867, she published The Story of Aunt Becky's Army-Life, an account of her wartime experiences.

== Early life and marriages ==
She was born in Ithaca, New York as Sarah A. Graham.

She married Abel O. Palmer, who died before 1862, and married David C. Young on April 6, 1867, after the Civil War.

== Nursing during the Civil War ==
Palmer left Ithaca on September 3, 1862, following the 109th New York Volunteer Infantry Regiment to Laurel, Maryland and leaving her two daughters in the care of relatives.

The regiment initially served at Annapolis Junction, Maryland, guarding the railroad to Washington, D.C.

In one anecdote she told, during the Siege of Petersburg Palmer wanted to send a seriously ill patient to Washington but the doctor in charge objected. She managed to obtain a ticket for him and sent him off, leading to an angry argument with the doctor the following day. Later she embellished this story to include multiple patients, and claimed that the doctor took his complaint to Union general Ulysses S. Grant. According to Palmer's later account, Grant "laughed and said 'I've got nothing to say. Aunt Becky outranks me!'"

At some point she acquired the nickname "Aunt Becky"; it is not clear if this nickname was applied to her during her civilian life before the American Civil War, or if the nickname was given by her patients or colleagues. One secondary source claims that patients often called her "Mother", a nickname she disliked, and she encouraged using the different nickname after a soldier suggested she looked like his Aunt Becky.

== After the Civil War ==
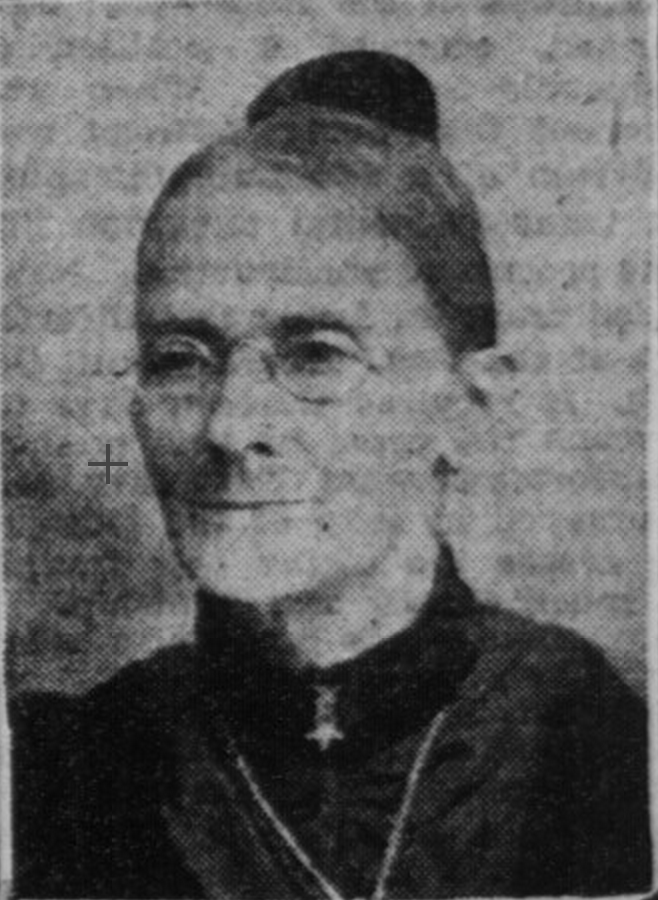
Palmer, from a photograph published in 1903

The Story of Aunt Becky's Army-Life was co-authored with Sylvia Lawson Covey. Palmer had kept a full diary of her nursing experiences, but most of the diary was lost, leaving only around three months of material and Palmer's account was therefore largely dictated from memory.

After her remarriage in 1867, her family moved to Des Moines, Iowa the following year. Palmer continued to be interested in the welfare of soldiers, and on the outbreak of the Spanish–American War Palmer raised funds for the Iowa Sanitation Commission, which provided medical supplies for the soldiers, and became the Commission's president.

She died on April 6, 1908.
