= Annie Cook =

American madam (c. 1840–1878)

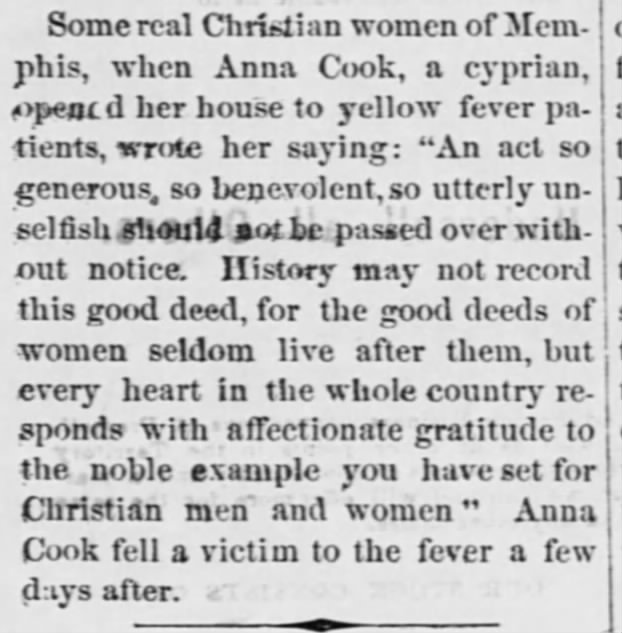
- "Some real Christian women of Memphis..." Weekly Republican, November 2, 1878
- Born: c. 1840
- Died: September 11, 1878
- Occupation: Madam
- Employer: Self employed
- Known for: Nursing patients during the 1873 and 1878 Yellow fever epidemics in Memphis, Tennessee

Annie Cook (c. 1840 – September 11, 1878) was a madam who converted her Memphis, Tennessee brothel into a hospital and nursed patients suffering during the Yellow fever epidemics of 1873 and 1878. She has been called the Mary Magdalene of Memphis.

== Biography ==
=== Brothel ===
It is believed that Cook, whose real name is unknown, was raised in Ohio and was of German descent. She moved to Memphis after the Civil War and opened a brothel called Mansion House.

=== Yellow fever ===
Memphis experienced Yellow fever epidemics in 1873 and 1878. During these outbreaks, Cook converted Mansion House to a makeshift hospital and nursed many who were suffering. Her work was recognized in local publications and she received a commendation from the Christian women of Louisville.

=== Death ===
Cook died from Yellow fever on September 11, 1878, during the Lower Mississippi Valley yellow fever epidemic of 1878. The Howard Association paid to have her grave moved to Elmwood Cemetery.
