= Kit Dalton =

American Confederate captain

Benjamin "Kit" Dalton
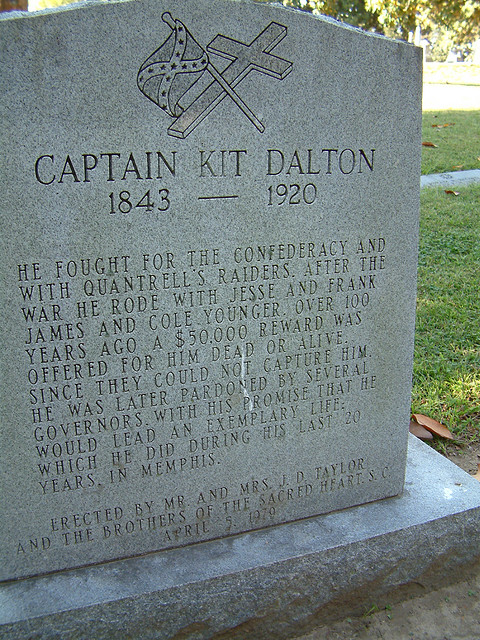
- Headstone of Captain Kit Dalton in Elmwood Cemetery
- Born: January 23, 1843
- Died: April 3, 1920 (aged 77)

Captain Kit Dalton (23 January 1843 – 3 April 1920) was an American Confederate Army captain.

"He fought for the Confederacy and with Quantrill's Raiders. After the war, he rode with Jesse & Frank James and Cole Younger over 100 years ago. A$50,000 reward was offered for him dead or alive; since they could not capture him, he was later pardoned by several governors with his promise that he would lead an exemplary life, which he did during his last 20 years, in Memphis."

Kit Dalton is buried at Elmwood Cemetery, in the section known as Confederate's Rest.
