= Mary Forrest Bradley =

American historian (1869–1965)

Tennessee Division President of the United Daughters of the Confederacy

Personal details
- Born: Mary Forrest; August 2, 1869 Oxford, Mississippi, U.S.
- Died: October 21, 1965 (aged 96) Memphis, Tennessee, U.S.
- Resting place: Elmwood Cemetery
- Spouse: Thomas J. Bradley (1892–1917; his death)
- Children: 5
- Relatives: Nathan Bedford Forrest II (brother); Nathan Bedford Forrest (grandfather)
- Occupation: historian

Mary Forrest Bradley (August 12, 1869 – October 21, 1965) was an American historian. A granddaughter of Confederate States Army general and Ku Klux Klan Grand Wizard Nathan Bedford Forrest, Bradley was a prominent figure within the United Daughters of the Confederacy. She was instrumental in promoting the pseudo-historical Lost Cause narrative through her writing and her support for the installation of Confederate monuments in Tennessee.

== Early life and family ==
Bradley was born Mary Forrest on August 12, 1869, in Oxford, Mississippi, the daughter of Captain William Montgomery Bedford Forrest. She was a sister of Nathan Bedford Forrest II. The family moved to Memphis, Tennessee when she was a child. She was the granddaughter of General Nathan Bedford Forrest, an officer in the Confederate States Army who later became the Grand Wizard of the Ku Klux Klan.

== Adult life ==
As General Forrest's granddaughter, Bradley was dedicated to promoting recognition for his contributions to the Confederate States of America during the American Civil War, attending many society and historical events centered on glorifying him. She received thousands of letters weekly about her grandfather from people across the United States. A prominent society figure, she was president of the Nathan Bedford Forrest Chapter of the United Daughters of the Confederacy and also served as president of the Tennessee Division of the organization. During her term as state president, she laid a wreath of roses at the statue Sam Davis at the Tennessee State Capitol. She used her social position and family connection to promote the construction and installation of Confederate monuments, condemn literature and other artistic works that painted the Antebellum and Confederate South in a negative or critical light, and glorify her grandfather and other Confederate military and political figures. She authored a biography on her grandfather, which was read to members of the United Daughters of the Confederacy.

In 1916, Bradley laid the cornerstone of a monument to her grandfather, in accordance with Masonic rites, during a ceremony in which Generals D.C. Kelly and John B. Gordon were present. Inside the monument were documents including a list of the charter members of the Confederate Southern Memorial Association, a poem by Virginia Frazer Boyle, and the scores of "The Star-Spangled Banner", "The Girl I Left Behind", "Yankee Doodle Dandy", and "Dixie" enclosed within a copper box.

In November 1926, she protested the filming of Uncle Tom's Cabin in Memphis and condemned the novel, calling it a "rank injustice to the South" and claimed that the story was "false" and "a direct insult to the old true South."

In 1952, Bradley was the guest of honor at a gathering of approximately three hundred people at Forrest Park in Memphis, for a 131st birthday celebration of her late grandfather. The event included a speech given by Judge Carl N. Stokes and thousands of flowers being dropped overhead by the Weekend Warriors of the Naval Air Force Reserve.

Bradley was also a member of the Tennessee Historical Society.

== Death ==
She died at Methodist University Hospital in Memphis on October 21, 1965. Her funeral was held at the Memphis Funeral Home, followed by a private graveside service at Elmwood Cemetery.
