= Elmwood Cemetery (Memphis, Tennessee) =

Historic cemetery in Shelby County, Tennessee

- U.S. National Register of Historic Places
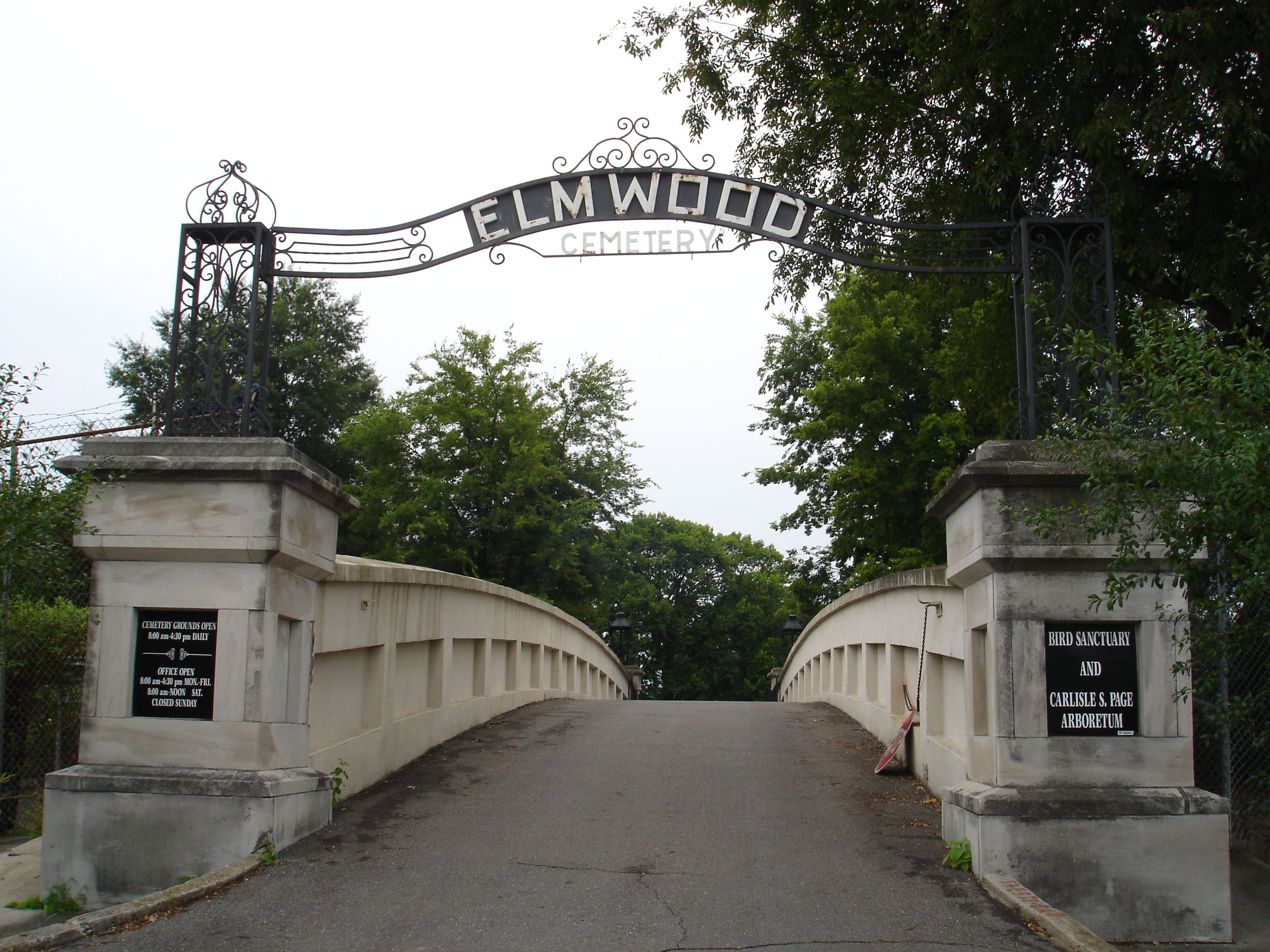

- Location within Tennessee
- Location: Memphis, Tennessee, US
- Coordinates: 35°07′19″N 90°01′45″W
- NRHP reference No.: 78002632; 0200023
- Added to NRHP: May 22, 1978; March 20, 2002

Elmwood Cemetery is the oldest active cemetery in Memphis, Tennessee. It was established in 1852 as one of the first rural cemeteries in the South.

== Origins ==
On 28 August 1852, fifty prominent Memphis citizens each contributed $500 for stock certificates in order to purchase 40 acres (160,000 m^{2}) of land for the cemetery; they envisioned that this land would be a park for the living as well as the dead, where family outings, picnics, and social gatherings could occur. It was meant to be a place where beautiful gardens were tended and individual monuments celebrated both life and death. The name for the place was chosen in a drawing: several proposed names were put into a hat and Elmwood was drawn, with the stockholders stating they were "well pleased" with the selection. Ironically, they had to hurriedly order some elms trees from New York to place among the native oaks of Memphis, since there were no elms in the area. After the American Civil War, the property was expanded to 80 acres (320,000 m^{2}) for another $40,000. In the 1870s, the original corporation controlling the cemetery was dissolved and it became one of the oldest nonprofits in Tennessee.

== Civil War burials ==
About 1,000 Confederate soldiers and veterans are buried in Confederate Soldiers Rest, located in the cemetery's Fowler Section. Many other Confederates are buried elsewhere in the cemetery. The first burial in Confederate Soldiers Rest was William (Thomas) Gallagher on June 17, 1861, and the last interment was John Frank Gunter on April 1, 1940. Among the Confederate generals buried there are James Patton Anderson, a former U.S. Congressman who commanded the Army of Tennessee in 1862, Colton Greene, Preston Smith and William Henry Carroll. Other burials include Isham G. Harris, Tennessee's Confederate-era governor, Thomas Battle Turley, CSA private and U.S. Senator from Tennessee, and William Graham Swan, a Confederate congressman and mayor of Knoxville.

Union soldiers also were buried at Elmwood in the 1860s, but almost all were removed in 1868 and reinterred in Memphis National Cemetery. Union general, William Jay Smith is interred at Elmwood.

Also interred at Elmwood is renowned Civil War author Shelby Foote, famous for his comprehensive three volume, 3000-page history of the war The Civil War: A Narrative. He is buried beside the family plot of Confederate General Nathan Bedford Forrest. Forrest himself was also originally buried at Elmwood, but in 1904 the remains of Forrest and his wife Mary were disinterred and moved to a Memphis city park originally named Forrest Park in his honor, that has since been renamed Health Sciences Park.

== Yellow Fever burials ==
There were several outbreaks of yellow fever in Memphis during the 1870s, the worst outbreak occurring in 1878, with over 5,000 fatalities in the city itself and 20,000 along the whole of the Mississippi River Valley. Some 2,500 of the Memphis victims are buried in four public lots at Elmwood; among them are doctors, ministers, nuns, travelers, and even sex workers who died while tending to the sick.

== Notable burials ==
- Charles W. Adams (1817–1878), military officer
- Stephen Adams (1807–1857), politician
- James Patton Anderson (1822–1872), politician
- Finis L. Bates (1848–1933), lawyer
- Thea Bowman (1937–1970), religious leader and civil rights activist
- Mary Forrest Bradley (1869–1965), historian
- William Henry Carroll (1810–1868), military officer
- James Ronald Chalmers (1831–1898), politician and military officer
- Robert Reed Church (1839–1912), businessman
- Jeremiah Watkins Clapp (1814–1898), politician
- Annie Cook (c. 1840–1878), madam
- E. H. Crump (1874–1954), politician
- Kit Dalton (1843–1920), military officer
- Andrew Jackson Donelson (1799–1871), politician and diplomat
- Henry T. Ellett (1812–1887), politician and judge
- Francis Fentress (1873–1900), lawyer and judge
- John Calvin Fiser (1838–1876), military officer
- Shelby Foote (1916–2005), novelist and historian
- Jeffrey E. Forrest (c. 1837–1864), slave trader and military officer
- Nathan Bedford Forrest (1821–1877), farmer, military officer, and Klansman
- Nathan Bedford Forrest II (1871–1931), businessman and Klansman
- Mae Glover (1906–1985), country blues singer
- James Robinson Graves (1820–1893), preacher and writer
- Colton Greene (1833–1900), military officer
- Elkanah Greer (1825–1877), military officer
- George Gordon (1836–1911), military officer and politician
- George W. Guess (c. 1822–1868), politician
- Landon Carter Haynes (1816–1875), politician
- Joseph Brown Heiskell (1823–1913), politician
- Napoleon Hill (1830–1909), businessman
- Asa Hodges (1822–1900), politician
- Benjamin Hooks (1925–2010), civil rights activist and minister
- Wayne Jackson (1941–2016), musician
- Spencer Jarnagin (1792–1851), politician
- James C. Jones (1809–1859), politician
- Thomas J. Latham (1831–1911), politician
- John W. Leftwich (1823–1870), politician
- Robert F. Looney (1824–1899), military officer
- Robert B. Macon (1859–1925), politician
- Estes Mann (1894–1958), architect
- John Donelson Martin (1830–1862), military officer
- Kenneth McKellar (1869–1957), politician
- Robert J. Morgan (1826–1899), military officer
- Bill Ramsey (1920–2008), baseball player
- Robert V. Richardson (1820–1870), military officer
- Clara Robertson (1857–1883), clairvoyant
- Bolton Smith (1861–1935), lawyer
- Maxine Smith (1929–2013), academic and civil rights activist
- William Jay Smith (1823–1915), politician
- William Graham Swan (c. 1821–1869), politician
- Georgia Tann (1891–1950), child trafficker
- Jacob Thompson (1810–1885), politician
- Thomas B. Turley (1845–1910), politician
- Isham G. Harris (1818–1897), politician
- Alice Mitchell (1872–1898), murderer
- John Rowlett Paine (1879–?), politician
- Gideon Johnson Pillow (1806–1878), military officer
- Alfred Jefferson Vaughan Jr. (1830–1899), military officer
- Lucius M. Walker (1829–1863), military officer
- H. Casey Young (1828–1899), politician
