= Nathan Bedford Forrest II =

American neo-Confederate and Ku Klux Klan official

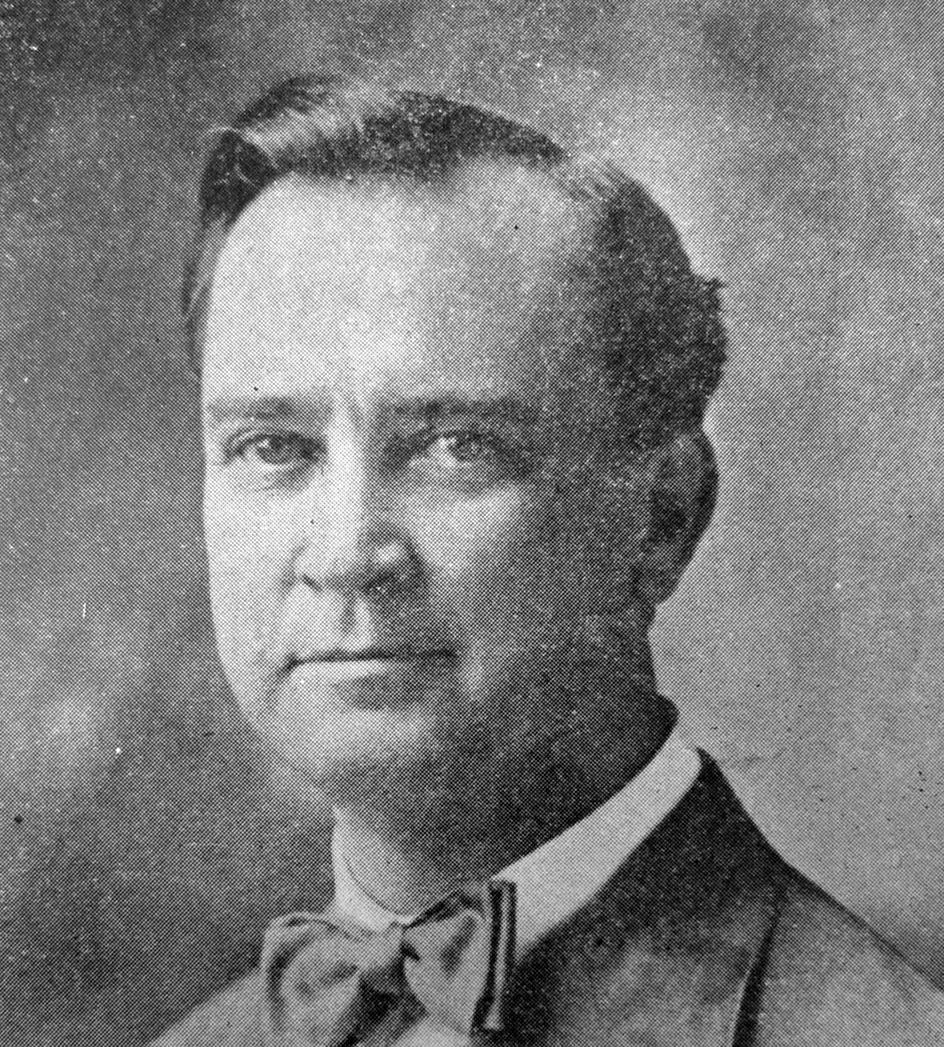
- Nathan Bedford Forrest II in 1918
- Born: April 6, 1872; Oxford, Mississippi, U.S.
- Died: March 11, 1931 (aged 58); White Springs, Florida, U.S.
- Resting place: Elmwood Cemetery; Memphis, Tennessee, U.S. 35°07′20.8″N 90°01′46.4″W
- Occupation: Businessman
- Title: 19th Commander-in-Chief of the Sons of Confederate Veterans
- Term: 1919–1921
- Predecessor: Carl W. Hinton
- Successor: Edgar Scurry
- Spouse: Mattie Patton (m. 1904)
- Children: 5, including Nathan Bedford III
- Relatives: Mary Forrest Bradley (sister); Nathan Bedford Forrest (grandfather)

Nathan Bedford Forrest II (April 6, 1872 – March 11, 1931) was an American businessman who served as the 19th Commander-in-Chief of the Sons of Confederate Veterans from 1919 to 1921.

== Early life ==
Nathan Bedford Forrest II was born on April 6, 1872, in Oxford, Mississippi, as the third son of Jane Taylor (née Cook) and William Montgomery Forrest. His father served as a captain in the Confederate States Army. He was the grandson of Confederate general Nathan Bedford Forrest. He was high school classmates with James R. Venable.

== Career ==
At the age of 25, Forrest engaged in the Klondike Gold Rush for four years as a miner and prospector. In Memphis, Tennessee, Forrest was a railroad and levee contractor and was associated with his father's work.

Forrest was adjutant general of the Sons of Confederate Veterans for 14 years. On October 9, 1919, he was elected as commander-in-chief of the Sons of Confederate Veterans, succeeding Carl Hinton. In 1921, he did seek re-election. He was succeeded by Edgar Scurry. In the Confederate Veteran, Forrest claimed that in 1915 he and Tate Brady were making plans together for an "active campaign throughout Oklahoma" on behalf of the Sons of Confederate Veterans. He served as secretary and business manager at Lanier University in Atlanta, a college that was sold to the Klan in 1921.

In 1915, Forrest was aide to William Joseph Simmons during the Ku Klux Klan revival. Forrest became an exalted cyclops of the Nathan Bedford Forrest Klan No. 1 in Atlanta. In July 1922, he was appointed as Grand Dragon of the Ku Klux Klan in Georgia. He was succeeded in the position by Samuel Green. In 1922, he moved from Biloxi, Mississippi, to Atlanta. He was no longer active with the Klan, but held an honorary title of klokann, a national body office. He was imperial kligrapp (national secretary of the Klan) for five years until he left the position due to poor health. He was one of six klansmen in the 1923 imperial kloncilium that settled financial disputes between William Joseph Simmons and Hiram Wesley Evans. He was on the Klan's strategy board at the 1924 Democratic National Convention.

== Personal life ==
Forrest married Mattie Patton, daughter of Helen (née Coulter) and Thomas Newton Patton, on June 1, 1904. Her father served under Forrest's grandfather in the Civil War. They had two sons and three daughters, Ford Tyler, Nathan Bedford III, Mary Helen, Nancy, and Martha. His son Nathan Bedford III was a senior officer of the United States Army Air Forces killed in action in the European Theater of World War II. His sister was historian Mary Forrest Bradley.

Forrest was a member of the Sardis Lodge; the Free and Accepted Masons, Mount Herman chapter; the Royal Arch Masons, Jason Burr council; the Royal and Select Masons; the Atlanta Commandery No. 9 of the Knights Templar; the Arctic Brothers; the Yukon Pioneers; and the North Avenue Presbyterian Church. Towards the end of his life, he lived in Atlanta.

Forrest had a stroke in 1930. He died on March 12, 1931, in White Springs, Florida, while visiting there. He was buried at Elmwood Cemetery in Memphis, Tennessee.

== See also ==
- List of commanders-in-chief of the Sons of Confederate Veterans

Non-profit organization positions
Preceded by Carl W. Hinton	Commander-in-Chief of the Sons of Confederate Veterans; 1919–1921	Succeeded by Edgar Scurry
