= MPRP =

MPRP may refer to:

- Muslim People's Republic Party
- Mongolian People's Revolutionary Party (disambiguation)
- Maine Power Reliability Program
- Maryland Piedmont Reliability Project
