= Andrew Duck =

American politician (born 1962)

Member-elect of the Maryland House of Delegates from the 4th district
- Assuming office January 13, 2027
- Succeeding: April Fleming Miller

Personal details
- Born: 1962 (age 63–64)
- Party: Democratic
- Spouse: Whitney McDyer
- Children: 3
- Education: Texas State University; Oklahoma State University

Military service
- Allegiance: United States
- Branch/service: United States Army; United States Marine Corps
- Years of service: 1982–2004
- Rank: Captain
- Unit: I Marine Expeditionary Force
- Battles/wars: Gulf War; Iraq War

Andrew J. Duck (born 1962) is an American politician and U.S. Army veteran who is a member-elect of the Maryland House of Delegates from the 4th district. A member of the Democratic Party, he was the party's nominee in Maryland's 6th congressional district in the 2006 and 2010 elections, losing to Republican incumbent Roscoe Bartlett.

== Early life and education ==
Duck was born in 1962, and was one of seventeen children. He was raised in Berwyn Heights, Maryland, and graduated from Middletown High School before attending Texas State University, where he earned a Bachelor's degree in public administration, and the University of Oklahoma, where he took graduate courses in economics.

== Career ==
Duck enlisted in the U.S. Army in 1982 as a company clerk after his son was born prematurely and he could not find an insurance company because it was considered a pre-existing condition. He was stationed in Bosnia three times from 1995 to 2000, afterwards returning to the U.S. to become a stockbroker for Merrill Lynch. He re-enlisted when the Gulf War started, and was assigned to be trained as a Korean linguist. When the Iraq War started in 2003, he was deployed as an intelligence liaison officer to the I Marine Expeditionary Force of the U.S. Marine Corps. He was also stationed in West Germany and South Korea. Duck retired as a captain in 2004, out of frustration with the Bush administration's handling of the Iraq War. Afterwards, Duck worked for Northrop Grumman and as a contractor supporting the U.S. Department of Defense.

=== Political involvement ===
During the 2004 United States presidential election, Duck co-founded "Frederick for Kerry". In 2006, he ran for the U.S. House of Representatives in Maryland's 6th congressional district, challenging Republican incumbent Roscoe Bartlett. Duck garnered national attention as an military intelligence officer and critic of the Iraq War, but was defeated in the general election on November 7, 2006, receiving 38.4% of the vote. Duck ran for Congress in the 6th district again in 2008, but lost to Frederick mayor Jennifer Dougherty in the Democratic primary election. Afterwards, Duck was appointed to fill a vacancy in the Frederick County Democratic Central Committee. Duck ran for Congress a third time in 2010, winning the Democratic primary but losing to Bartlett in the general election with 33.2% of the vote.

In November 2016, following businessman Donald Trump's victory in the 2016 United States presidential election, Duck organized a "Love Trumps Hate" rally in Frederick. He also helped form the community organization Frederick Cares, which held forums to help bridge the local political divide. He also became involved with organizing with Our Revolution in western Maryland. In June 2017, Duck filed to run for Congress in Maryland's 6th congressional district, seeking to succeed Democratic incumbent John Delaney. In the Democratic primary, he criticized eventual-nominee and multimillionaire David Trone, saying Trone was buying the seat. Duck was defeated in the Democratic primary by businessman David Trone in June 2018, placing fifth with 4.9% of the vote.

In 2020, Duck ran to be a delegate at the 2020 Democratic National Convention, pledged to U.S. senator Elizabeth Warren.

In 2022, Duck ran for the Maryland House of Delegates in District 4 alongside his son, Brandon Duck, and daughter, Millicent Hall. The Duck family was defeated by Republican nominees Barrie Ciliberti, April Fleming Miller, and Jesse Pippy in the general election.

=== Maryland House of Delegates ===
In 2026, Duck again ran for the Maryland House of Delegates in District 4. He placed first in the Democratic primary in June 2026, and defeated Republicans April Fleming Miller and Jason Keckler in the general election on November 3, 2026. Duck will be sworn in on January 13, 2027, and will be a member of the Ways and Means Committee.

== Political positions ==
=== Education ===
During his 2008 congressional campaign, Duck supported repealing the No Child Left Behind Act.

=== Energy ===
During his 2006 congressional campaign, Duck supported increasing funding for U.S. Department of Energy research programs and establishing a tax credit program for conservation efforts, including improved insulation, improved energy controls, the re-engineering of factories, and the use of mass transit. He also criticized Bartlett for voting to increase corporate average fuel economy standards in 2005.

During his 2026 House of Delegates campaign, Duck opposed expanding Frederick County's zoning overlay of areas where data centers would be allowed, but added that he did not oppose all data centers. He also said that he would oppose the rapid expansion of data centers until he sees a rapid increase in generating electricity in order to prevent electricity price increases. Duck criticized the Maryland Piedmont Reliability Project, saying that the proposed power line was not being handled in a transparent manner.

=== Health care ===
During his 2008 congressional campaign, Duck supported establishing universal health care, which he said would lower medical costs overall by increasing preventive care and decreasing visits to the emergency room by uninsured individuals. He also criticized Bartlett for voting against extending the State Children's Health Insurance Program. In April 2026, Duck supported establishing a state-level Medicare for All program in Maryland.

=== Immigration ===
During his 2010 congressional campaign, Duck opposed making Arizona SB 1070 a federal law, saying that federal officials should instead enforce the current federal law. During his 2018 congressional campaign, he supported extending temporary protected status for immigrants from countries such as Nicaragua, El Salvador, Nepal, and Honduras, and criticized Frederick County's 287(g) program.

=== Iraq War ===
During his 2006 congressional campaign, Duck supported closing the Guantanamo Bay detention camp and bringing European allies into the Iraq War. During his 2008 congressional campaign, Duck supported withdrawing U.S. combat troops from the Iraq War, but supported leaving trainers for Iraqi Ground Forces.

=== Redistricting ===
During his 2018 congressional campaign, Duck supported national redistricting reform and criticized Maryland's 6th congressional district as gerrymandered. He also supports early voting, automatic voter registration, and same-day voter registration.

=== Social issues ===
During his 2006 congressional campaign, Duck described himself as pro-life, but opposed banning abortions.

=== Taxes ===
During his 2026 House of Delegates campaign, Duck supported establishing an alternative minimum tax to "limit the amount of income that can be avoided with tax loopholes, to prevent millionaires from getting away with paying nothing in taxes, while working people are forced to pay the costs of needed public services".

=== Transportation ===
During his 2008 congressional campaign, Duck supported adding high-occupancy vehicle lanes to Interstate 270 from Clarksburg, West Virginia to Frederick, Maryland, and supported expanding MARC Train services.

== Electoral history ==
2006 Maryland's 6th congressional district election
Primary election
| Party | Candidate | Votes | % |
|---|---|---|---|
| Democratic | Andrew Duck | 22,903 | 59.2% |
| Democratic | Barry J.C. Kissin | 15,780 | 40.8% |
| Total votes | | 38,683 | 100.0% |
General election
| Republican | Roscoe Bartlett (incumbent) | 141,200 | 59.0% |
| Democratic | Andrew Duck | 92,030 | 38.4% |
| Green | Robert E. Kozak | 6,095 | 2.5% |
| Write-in | | 128 | 0.1% |
| Total votes | | 239,453 | 100.0% |

2008 Maryland's 6th congressional district Democratic primary election
| Party | Candidate | Votes | % |
|---|---|---|---|
| Democratic | Jennifer Dougherty | 25,967 | 44.2% |
| Democratic | Andrew Duck | 21,629 | 36.8% |
| Democratic | Robin L. Deibert | 5,800 | 9.9% |
| Democratic | Larry John Smith | 4,162 | 7.1% |
| Democratic | Rick Lank | 1,222 | 2.1% |
| Total votes | | 58,780 | 100.0% |

2010 Maryland's 6th congressional district election
Primary election
| Party | Candidate | Votes | % |
|---|---|---|---|
| Democratic | Andrew Duck | 21,605 | 65.4% |
| Democratic | Chris Graves | 11,449 | 34.6% |
| Total votes | | 33,054 | 100.0% |
General election
| Republican | Roscoe Bartlett (incumbent) | 148,820 | 61.4% |
| Democratic | Andrew Duck | 80,455 | 33.2% |
| Libertarian | Dan Massey | 6,816 | 2.8% |
| Constitution | Michael Reed | 5,907 | 2.4% |
| Write-in | | 191 | 0.1% |
| Total votes | | 242,189 | 100.0% |

2018 Maryland's 6th congressional district Democratic primary election
| Party | Candidate | Votes | % |
|---|---|---|---|
| Democratic | David Trone | 24,103 | 40.0% |
| Democratic | Aruna Miller | 18,524 | 30.7% |
| Democratic | Nadia Hashimi | 6,304 | 10.5% |
| Democratic | Roger Manno | 6,257 | 10.4% |
| Democratic | Andrew Duck | 2,949 | 4.9% |
| Democratic | Chris Graves | 982 | 1.6% |
| Democratic | George English | 650 | 1.1% |
| Democratic | Christopher Hearsey | 531 | 0.9% |
| Total votes | | 60,300 | 100.0% |

2022 Maryland House of Delegates 4th district election
Primary election
| Party | Candidate | Votes | % |
|---|---|---|---|
| Democratic | Andrew Duck | 7,764 | 34.4% |
| Democratic | Millicent A. Hall | 7,703 | 34.1% |
| Democratic | Brandon Duck | 7,137 | 31.6% |
| Total votes | | 22,604 | 100.0% |
General election
| Republican | Jesse Pippy (incumbent) | 30,670 | 19.1% |
| Republican | April Fleming Miller | 29,717 | 18.5% |
| Republican | Barrie Ciliberti (incumbent) | 29,705 | 18.5% |
| Democratic | Andrew Duck | 24,489 | 15.2% |
| Democratic | Millicent A. Hall | 23,361 | 14.5% |
| Democratic | Brandon Duck | 22,628 | 14.1% |
| Write-in | | 93 | 0.06% |
| Total votes | | 160,663 | 100.0% |

2026 Maryland House of Delegates 4th district election
Primary election
| Party | Candidate | Votes | % |
|---|---|---|---|
| Democratic | Andrew Duck | 7,265 | 28.3% |
| Democratic | Jerry Donald | 7,036 | 27.4% |
| Democratic | Alleria Stanley | 6,008 | 23.4% |
| Democratic | Paul Gilligan | 5,331 | 20.8% |
| Total votes | | 25,640 | 100.0% |
General election
| Democratic | Jerry Donald | 29,901 | 17.7% |
| Democratic | Andrew Duck | 29,106 | 17.3% |
| Republican | Jesse Pippy (incumbent) | 28,015 | 16.6% |
| Democratic | Alleria Stanley | 27,888 | 16.5% |
| Republican | April Fleming Miller (incumbent) | 27,084 | 16.1% |
| Republican | Jason E. Keckler | 26,530 | 15.7% |
| Write-in | | 87 | 0.1% |
| Total votes | | 168,611 | 100.0% |

== Personal life ==
Duck is married to Whitney McDyer Duck, whom he met after graduating high school at age 16 and marrying after the birth of his first son, Brandon. Together, they have three children. Whitney unsuccessfully ran for the Frederick County Board of Education in 2006.

Duck is a Catholic.
