= April Fleming Miller =

American politician (born 1970)

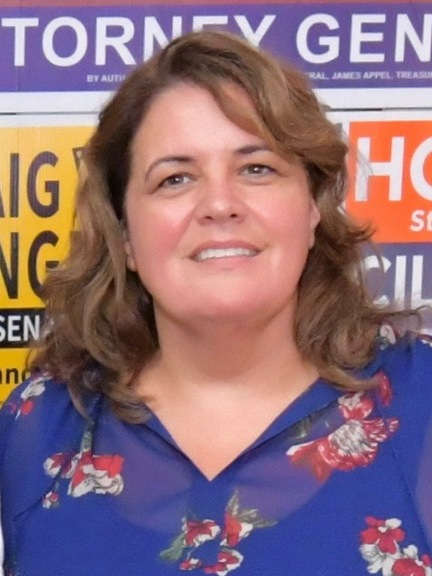
- Miller in 2018

Member of the Maryland House of Delegates from the 4th district
- Incumbent
- Assumed office January 11, 2023 Serving with Jesse Pippy and Barrie Ciliberti
- Preceded by: Dan Cox

Member and Vice Chair of the Frederick County Board of Education
- In office 2010–2018
- Preceded by: Seat established
- Succeeded by: Jay Mason

Personal details
- Born: October 5, 1970 (age 56) Washington, D.C., U.S.
- Party: Republican
- Education: University of Maryland, Baltimore County (BA); Salus University (PhD)
- Occupation: Optometrist

April Fleming Miller (born October 5, 1970) is an American politician who is a member of the Maryland House of Delegates for District 4 in Frederick County, Maryland. She was previously an at-large member of the Frederick County Board of Education from 2010 to 2018.

== Background ==
Miller graduated from Middletown High School in 1988. She later attended the University of Maryland, Baltimore County, where she earned a Bachelor of Arts degree in biology/psychology in 1992, and the Salus University, where she earned her Doctorate of Optometry in 1996. Miller is an optometrist at Evich and Nathan Optometry and Optical Center in Frederick, Maryland.

Miller served on the Frederick County Board of Education from 2010 to 2018, and was elected its vice president in 2017. She was defeated in the 2018 general election after serving two terms on the board. In January 2020, Governor Larry Hogan appointed Miller to a five-year term on the Frederick Community College Board of Trustees, succeeding former board chair Debra Borden.

In 2022, Miller was one of four Republicans to run for the Maryland House of Delegates in District 4. She won the Republican primary, coming in second place behind incumbent state Delegate Jesse Pippy with 25.8 percent of the vote.

== In the legislature ==
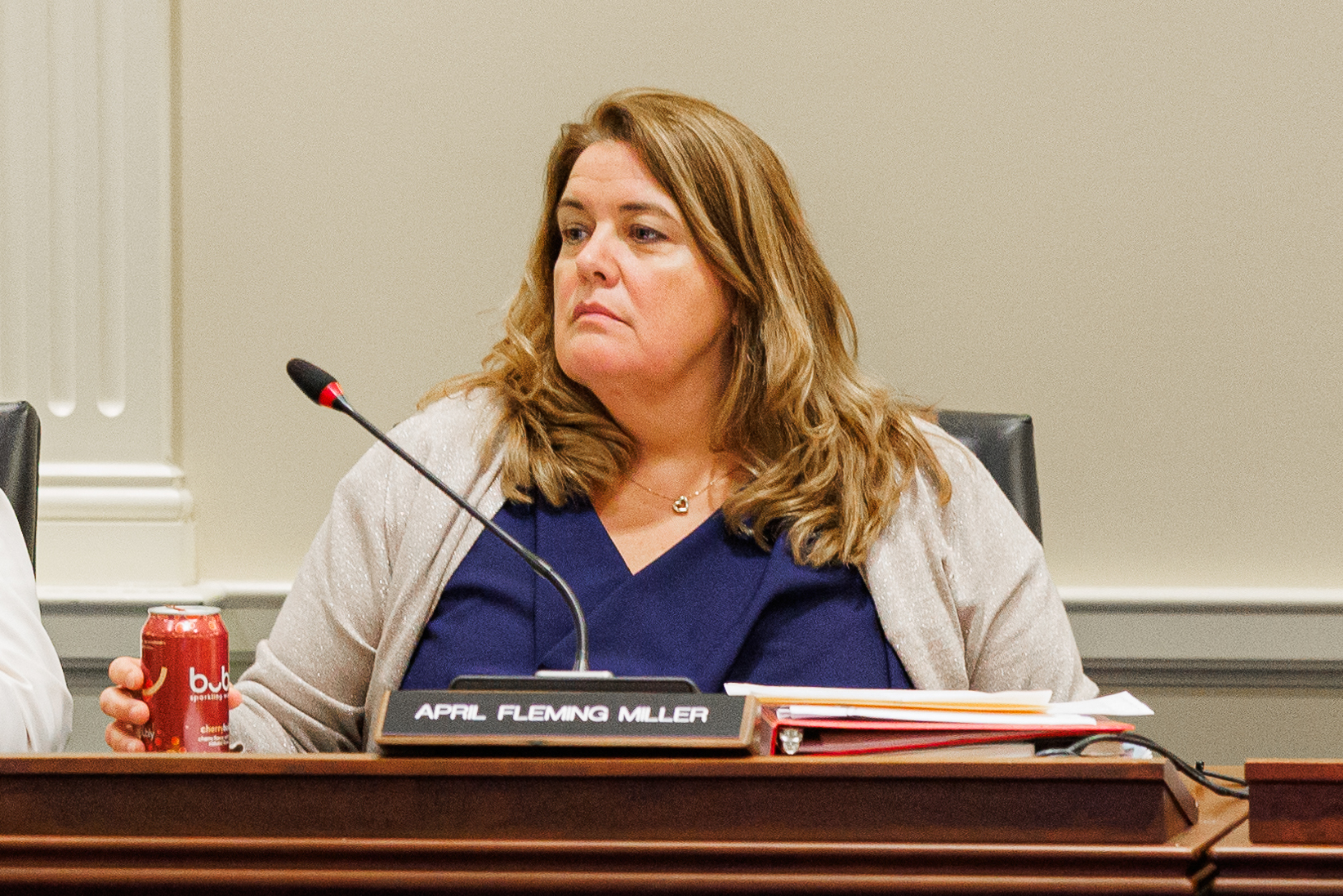
Miller in the Ways and Means Committee, 2024

Miller was sworn into the Maryland House of Delegates on January 11, 2023. She was a member of the House Ways and Means Committee.

Miller ran for a second term in the 2026 Maryland House of Delegates election, in which she lost re-election to Jerry Donald and Andrew Duck.

== Political positions ==
Miller identifies as a "common-sense conservative".

=== COVID-19 pandemic ===
In October 2021, Miller said she opposed COVID-19 vaccine mandates for students.

=== Development initiatives ===
During the 2026 legislative session, Miller introduced a bill to place strict environmental and noise restrictions on data centers, as well as limits to local jurisdictions' ability to approve data center construction on agricultural lands. In August 2026, during debate on a proposed constitutional amendment on redistricting, she introduced an amendment that would impose a temporary statewide moratorium on hyperscale data center construction.

In April 2026, Miller expressed concerns with the Maryland Piedmont Reliability Project, which she said would be disruptive to agriculture and other activities in Frederick County.

=== Education ===
Miller does not support the Blueprint for Maryland's Future, a sweeping education reform bill passed in 2021, saying that she would like the Maryland General Assembly to pause its implementation as schools recovered from the COVID-19 pandemic. In April 2026, Miller supported reexamining the Blueprint to address education issues that arose after the COVID-19 pandemic.

In 2011, Miller expressed sympathy with a parent complaint that the textbook Social Studies Alive! Our Community and Beyond was politically tilted, saying "I think it disrespects our country, because it doesn't say a lot positive about it, and I think that's detrimental to unity." In 2012, Miller objected to allowing Toni Morrison's Song of Solomon to be available in high schools, saying that while she did not want to ban books, she thought the school board should be more involved in evaluating books used in schools.

In February 2015, Miller testified in support of a bill requiring parents to provide consent before schools could survey students about their drug use or sexual activity.

In April 2016, Miller introduced a policy that required refusals by students or parents to take federally and state-mandated tests to be "honored without question".

In June 2017, Miller voted against a contract with the Frederick County Teachers Association, opposing the contract's four-year salary scale transition plan by saying that it did not benefit students and their families.

=== Energy ===
In April 2026, Miller supported repealing regulations to address climate change in order to generate more electricity in Maryland.

=== Social issues ===
During the 2024 legislative session, Miller introduced a bill that would require abortion care providers to notify law enforcement if they suspect a patient is a victim of sex trafficking, and would make not doing so a misdemeanor offense.

=== Taxes ===
In April 2026, Miller defended Maryland's hospitals following a whistleblower report accusing the state's hospitals of setting up offshore, for-profit insurance companies instead of buying policies from traditional commercial insurers to avoid paying Maryland's captive insurance tax.

== Electoral history ==
Frederick County Board of Education primary election, 2010
Candidate	Votes	%
Brad W. Young	18,197	18.2
James C. Reeder, Jr.	11,325	11.3
April Fleming Miller	7,464	7.5
Janice Spiegel	7,226	7.2
Colleen E. Cusimano	6,985	7.0
Jean Smith	6,927	6.9
Sarah McAleavy	5,849	5.9
Aubrey Harbaugh	5,597	5.6
Omari Patterson	5,372	5.4
Roger A. Smith	4,424	4.4
Barrie Ciliberti	4,332	4.3
Yonnas Kefle	3,898	3.9
Robert Joseph Johnson	3,847	3.9
Otto "Butch" Gross	3,381	3.4
Earl Wahlquist	2,906	2.9
Glenn E. Dexter	2,154	2.2

Frederick County Board of Education election, 2010
Candidate	Votes	%
Brad W. Young	43,414	21.3
James C. Reeder, Jr	30,780	15.1
Jean Smith	25,470	12.5
April Fleming Miller	23,352	11.5
Colleen E. Cusimano	23,177	11.4
Janice Spiegel	21,055	10.4
Aubrey Harbaugh	18,032	8.9
Sarah McAleavy	17,525	8.6
Write-in	542	0.3

Frederick County Board of Education election, 2014
Candidate	Votes	%
Liz Barrett	35,673	15.5
Brad W. Young	32,632	14.2
Colleen E. Cusimano	31,147	13.6
April Fleming Miller	29,700	12.9
Kenneth P. Kerr	29,657	12.9
Mike Ferrell	26,104	11.4
Millicent Hall	23,984	10.4
Richard S. Vallaster, III	20,470	8.9
Write-in	422	0.2

Frederick County Board of Education election, 2018
Candidate	Votes	%
Brad W. Young	50,179	17.7
Karen Yoho	39,242	13.8
Liz Barrett	38,146	13.4
Jay Mason	37,971	13.4
April Fleming Miller	35,938	12.6
Cindy Rose	31,968	11.2
Camden Raynor	28,191	9.9
Kim L. Williams	21,321	7.5
Write-in	1,206	0.4

Maryland House of Delegates District 4 Republican primary election, 2022
Party	Candidate	Votes	%
Republican	Jesse Pippy	10,450	33.4
Republican	April Fleming Miller	8,055	25.8
Republican	Barrie Ciliberti	7,361	23.5
Republican	Heath S. Barnes	5,398	17.3

Maryland House of Delegates District 4 election, 2022
Party	Candidate	Votes	%
Republican	Jesse Pippy	30,670	19.09
Republican	April Fleming Miller	29,717	18.50
Republican	Barrie Ciliberti	29,705	18.49
Democratic	Andrew Duck	24,489	15.24
Democratic	Millicent A. Hall	23,361	14.54
Democratic	Brandon Duck	22,628	14.08
Write-in		93	0.06
