= Democratic revolution (disambiguation) =

Democratic revolution is a revolution that installs a democratic government.

Democratic revolution may refer also to:

== Political parties ==
- Democratic Revolution, a Chilean political party
- Party of the Democratic Revolution, a Mexican political party

== Revolutions ==
- 1990 Democratic Revolution in Mongolia, a revolution leading to the fall of communism in Mongolia
- Hawaii Democratic Revolution of 1954, a nonviolent revolution that took place in Hawaii

== See also ==
- Bourgeois-democratic revolution, a term used in Marxist theory
- Front for Democratic Revolution, a coalition of mass organizations in El Salvador
- National Democratic Revolution, the official agenda of the African National Congress
- New Democracy or New Democratic Revolution
- Revolutionary Party, a list of political parties
