= RWP =

RWP can refer to:-

- Rana Wickrama Padakkama, Sri Lankan decoration
- Radio with Pictures, New Zealand programme
- Revolutionary Workers Party (disambiguation)
- RWP, IATA code for Benazir Bhutto International Airport (defunct)
- RWP, IATA code for PAF Base Nur Khan
