= Lara Westdorp =

American politician

Member-elect of the Maryland Senate from the 4th district
- Assuming office January 13, 2027
- Succeeding: William Folden

Personal details
- Born: Lara Lynn Roholt; 1967 or 1968 (age 58–59)
- Party: Democratic
- Education: Ohio State University; Indiana University

Lara Roholt Westdorp (born 1967/1968) is an American politician who is a member-elect of the Maryland Senate from the 4th district. She is a member of the Democratic Party.

== Early life and education ==
Lara Lynn Roholt was born 1967 or 1968 to Ronald and Linda Roholt. She earned a Bachelor's degree from Ohio State University in 1990 and a graduate degree from Indiana University in 1992.

== Career ==
In the 1990s, Westdorp worked for the Office of Management and Budget and the U.S. House Armed Services Committee. She later served as the chairwoman of the Frederick County Board of Zoning Appeals and as the chief of staff to then-state senator Ronald N. Young. She also served as the president of the Women's Democratic League of Frederick County and campaigned for Heather Mizeur during the 2014 Maryland gubernatorial election. Westdorp owns a Frederick-based reflexology business.

=== Maryland Senate ===
In 2025, Westdorp filed to run for the Maryland Senate in District 4, challenging incumbent Republican William Folden. During her campaign, she opposed the Maryland Piedmont Reliability Project and tariffs imposed by the second Trump administration, and supported reforms to the Blueprint for Maryland's Future to reduce its tax burden on local governments. In the general election, Westdorp collaborated with Democratic nominees for the Maryland House of Delegates, Frederick County Council, and school board to coordinate door-knocking efforts, with candidates splitting up turf and spreading each other's literature to cover the entire district. Westdorp defeated Folden in the general election on November 3, 2026.

Westdorp will be sworn in on January 13, 2027. She will be a member of the Senate Judicial Proceedings Committee.

== Personal life ==
On Apri 22, 1995, Westdorp married National Institutes of Health employee Andrew Frederick Westdorp. At the time, the couple lived in Rockville, Maryland.
