= People's Revolutionary Party =

People's Revolutionary Party is a name used by several political parties around the world:

- East Turkestan People's Revolutionary Party
  - East Turkestan Revolutionary Party, sometimes misidentified as the above party
- Ethiopian People's Revolutionary Party
- Kampuchean People's Revolutionary Party, now the Cambodian People's Party
- Lao People's Revolutionary Party
- Mongolian People's Revolutionary Party (disambiguation)
- People's Revolutionary Party (Burma)
- People's Revolutionary Party (Chile)
- People's Revolution Party (Congo)
- People's Revolutionary Party (South Korea)
- People's Revolutionary Party (Vietnam)
- Peoples Revolutionary Party of India
- People's Revolutionary Party of Kangleipak, rebel group in Manipur, India

== See also ==
- Revolutionary Party (disambiguation)
