= Jesse Pippy =

American politician (born 1982)

- Pippy in 2026

Member of the Maryland House of Delegates from the 4th district
- Incumbent
- Assumed office January 9, 2019 Serving with April Fleming Miller, Barrie S. Ciliberti
- Preceded by: Kathy Afzali

Personal details
- Born: Jesse Tyler Pippy; August 6, 1982 (age 44) Greenville, North Carolina, U.S.
- Party: Republican
- Spouse: Lindsey Carpenter (m. 2014)
- Children: 2
- Education: Christopher Newport University (BA); University of Maryland, Baltimore (JD)

Jesse Tyler Pippy (born August 6, 1982) is an American politician and lawyer who has served as a member of the Maryland House of Delegates representing District 4, which encompasses parts of Frederick County, since 2019. A member of the Republican Party, he has served as the chamber's minority whip since 2023.

== Early life and education ==
Pippy was born August 6, 1982. He grew up in a military family and lived in Europe and Asia. He attended Christopher Newport University, where he earned a B.A. degree in political science and then a J.D. degree at the University of Maryland School of Law.

== Political career ==
=== Early political career ===
Pippy first got involved with politics in 2014 when he unsuccessfully ran for the Maryland Senate in District 12. Afterwards, he became the chair of the Frederick County Young Republicans organization. In 2016, he was appointed by Governor Larry Hogan to serve as Commissioner on the Frederick County Board of License Commissioners, succeeding chairman Dick Zimmerman; he was later elected Chairman. Pippy resigned from the liquor board on August 7, 2018.

In August 2017, Pippy filed to run for the Maryland House of Delegates in District 4. He won the general election, receiving 19.7 percent of the vote.

=== Maryland House of Delegates ===
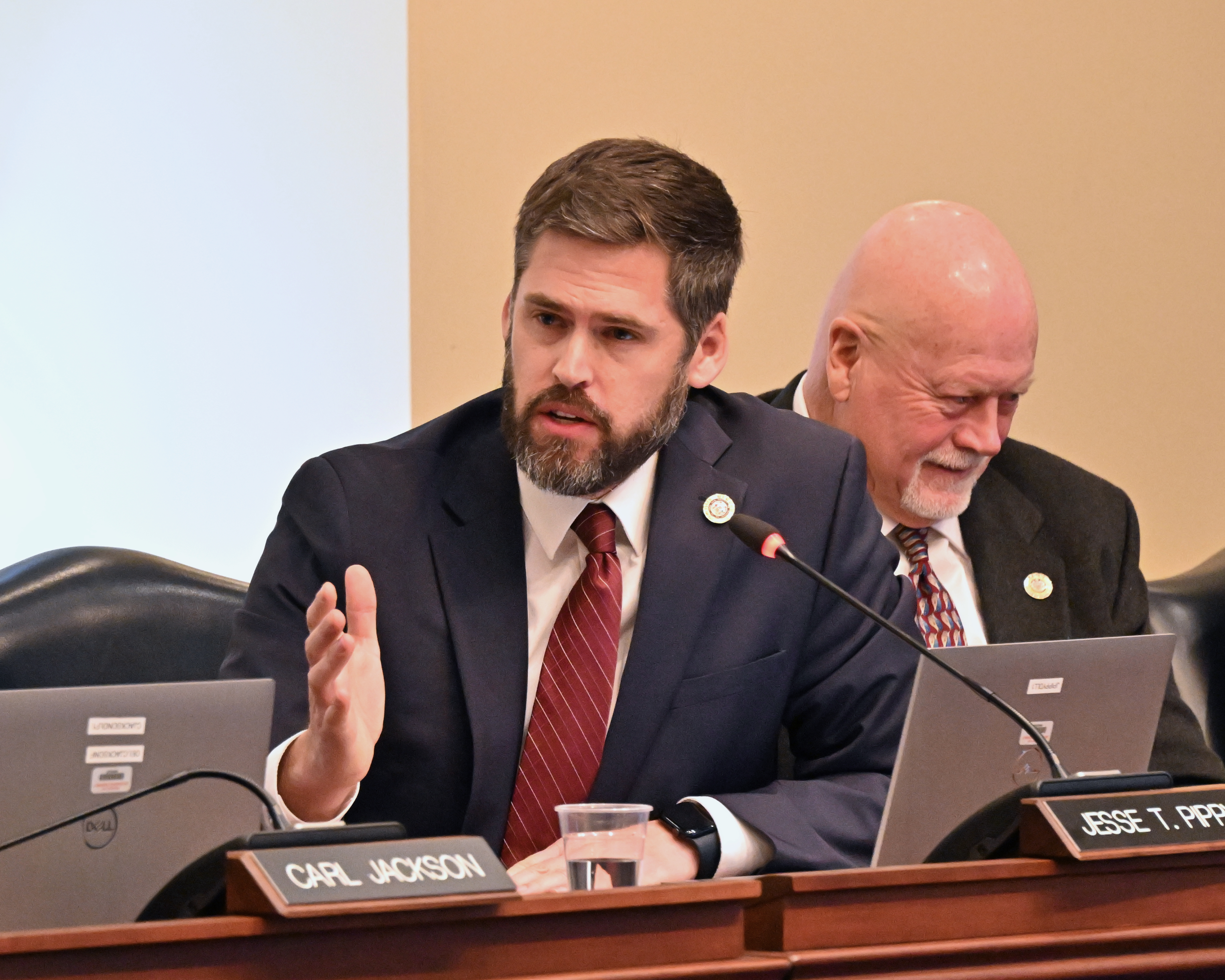
Pippy in the House of Delegates Economic Matters Committee, 2023

Pippy was sworn in to the Maryland House of Delegates on January 9, 2019. He was a member of the Judiciary Committee from 2019 to 2020, afterwards serving on the Economic Matters Committee since 2021. Pippy is also a member of the Frederick County Delegation, serving as its chair from 2020 to 2021 and since 2023, as well as the Maryland Legislative Latino Caucus, the Maryland Legislative Sportmen's Caucus, and the Maryland Veterans Caucus.

In June 2021, Pippy announced he would seek the State Senate seat in District 4 being vacated by Michael Hough, but in September 2021 he withdrew his candidacy. In February 2022, he announced that he would seek re-election to the House of Delegates.

== Political positions ==
=== Abortion ===
In March 2022, during a debate on legislation that would expand abortion access, Pippy introduced an amendment that would allow only physicians to provide abortion services. The House of Delegates voted to reject the amendment on a vote of 40–84.

=== Business ===
In March 2021, Pippy voted against legislation that would require businesses to create telework policies. In February 2026, he introduced a bill that would temporarily impose a moratorium on new data centers in Frederick County until the state completed an impact study on the data center industry.

=== COVID-19 pandemic ===
In March 2021, Pippy opposed a proposal by Governor Larry Hogan that would give state employees a $1,000 bonus for working during the coronavirus pandemic, saying that he felt the government needed to do more to help private sector employees. In June 2021, he supported Hogan's decision to end expanded unemployment benefits provided by the American Rescue Plan Act. In August 2021, Pippy opposed extending Maryland's state of emergency status for the delta variant.

=== Crime and policing ===
During the 2019 legislative session, Pippy introduced a bill that would recognize human trafficking as a "crime of violence" in Maryland. The bill passed and became law on April 18, 2019. He also introduced legislation that would expand the state's child pornography laws to include lascivious acts and computer-generated images, which passed and became law on April 30, 2019.

During the 2020 legislative session, Pippy introduced a bill that would replace the term "gang" with "criminal organization" in the state's criminal law code. The bill passed and became law on May 8, 2020. He also introduced legislation that would make strangulation a first-degree felony assault, which passed and became law on May 8, 2020.

During the 2021 legislative session, Pippy introduced a bill that would allow individuals to apply for a court order to obtain information from an electronic device of interest through fax or email. The bill passed and became law on May 30, 2021.

In February 2021, Pippy said that he opposed removing school resource officers from schools.

In 2025, Pippy introduced legislation to permit a court to order a child victim's testimony to be taken outside the physical courtroom and broadcast via closed-circuit television.

=== Energy ===
During the 2026 legislative session, Pippy opposed a bill that would prohibit investor-owned utilities from paying employee bonuses and supervisor compensation with ratepayer dollars, saying it would demonize utility executives instead of doing anything to reduce rates. In March 2026, he was one of 10 Republicans to vote for the Utility RELIEF Act, a legislative package aimed at lowering electricity costs through a series of reforms to EmPOWER Maryland, delays to clean energy goals, and limits on what costs utility companies could pass onto consumers.

=== Gun control ===
During the 2026 legislative session, Pippy opposed a bill that would ban the sale of firearms that can be converted into automatic firearms through the use of a Glock switch, saying that it would place further restrictions on lawful gun owners. He also expressed concerns with the bill's constitutionality, introducing an amendment that would nullify the entire bill if a court finds any provision of it to be invalid; the amendment was rejected in a 95–40 vote.

=== Healthcare ===
During the 2020 legislative session, Pippy introduced a bill that would fine healthcare facilities that engage in patient brokering. In 2024, Pippy introduced a bill to require medical providers to acquire consent from a patient or their guardian to dispose of their records. In the following year, the legislature passed a bill introduced by Pippy to update the notification method for the destruction of records.

=== Immigration ===
Pippy opposes any bills that would change how Maryland counties participate in the 287(g) program, saying that he believes any state-level restrictions on the program could be challenged in court since the 287(g) program is a federal program. In March 2021, during a debate on legislation that would require counties to end their 287(g) program contracts with U.S. Immigration and Customs Enforcement (ICE), he unsuccessfully attempted to amend the bill to create exemptions for Frederick County. During debate on a bill to ban 287(g) agreements in February 2026, Pippy introduced an amendment hat would still allow counties to enter into agreements with ICE to "enforce civil immigration law when an individual is charged with a violet crime", which was rejected. Pippy also opposed bills that would set mandatory minimum safety standards for private immigration detention facilities and prevent such facilities in areas not zoned for the use.

During the 2026 legislative session, Pippy opposed the Community Trust Act, which would require ICE to present a judicial warrant to compel action from the state, saying that the bill would make Maryland a "sanctuary state" and "further bankrupt us, if we're not bankrupt already".

=== National politics ===
In February 2025, Pippy expressed sympathy toward federal employees affected by the Trump administration's federal mass layoffs, but defended the firings as a necessity to address the United States's national debt and bring down federal spending, which he felt had increased "almost to an unsustainable amount". In September 2025, he defended the One Big Beautiful Bill Act, saying that some of the bill's cuts have resonated well with voters, and predicted that Democratic efforts to campaign against the bill in the 2026 midterm elections would be unsuccessful.

In October 2025, Pippy supported Senate President Bill Ferguson's decision to reject mid-decade redistricting in Maryland in response to Republican efforts to gerrymander congressional maps in various red states, saying that Democratic leaders in the Maryland General Assembly gerrymandering Maryland's 1st congressional district to oust Andy Harris, the only Republican in Maryland's congressional delegation, would be "the height of hypocrisy, especially when roughly 40% of Marylanders vote Republican". After Governor Wes Moore organized a commission to review mid-decade redistricting in Maryland in November 2025, Pippy said he would introduce a bill to ban mid-decade redistricting, codify part of a 2022 ruling that struck down Maryland's original congressional redistricting plan as an "extreme partisan gerrymander", and require Maryland's congressional districts to be drawn by an independent redistricting commission. He opposed the map advanced by the Governor's Redistricting Advisory Commission, which would redraw Maryland's 1st congressional district to improve the Democratic Party's chances of winning it, and criticized comparisons to the mid-decade redistricting map passed in Texas in 2025.

During the 2026 legislative session, Pippy introduced a resolution to honor Charlie Kirk and condemn his assassination.

=== Veterans ===
In 2026, Pippy introduced legislation that would allow local governments to set income eligibility for property tax credits for specified disabled veterans and surviving spouses.

== Personal life ==
Pippy married his wife, Lindsey May Carpenter, in Frederick, Maryland in 2014. Together, they have two boys.

== Electoral history ==
Maryland Senate District 12 Republican Primary Election, 2014
Party	Candidate	Votes	%
Republican	Jesse Tyler Pippy	2,938	100.0%

Maryland Senate District 12 General Election, 2014
Party	Candidate	Votes	%
Democratic	Edward J. Kasemeyer	21,986	58.6%
Republican	Jesse Tyler Pippy	15,481	41.3%
N/A	Other Write-Ins	47	0.1%

Maryland House of Delegates District 4 Republican Primary Election, 2018
Party	Candidate	Votes	%
Republican	Dan Cox	7,728	35.5%
Republican	Jesse T. Pippy	7,052	32.4%
Republican	Barrie S. Ciliberti	7,018	32.2%

Maryland House of Delegates District 4 General Election, 2018
Party	Candidate	Votes	%
Republican	Dan Cox	33,303	20.6%
Republican	Jesse T. Pippy	31,817	19.7%
Republican	Barrie S. Ciliberti	31,071	19.2%
Democratic	Lois Jarman	22,807	14.1%
Democratic	Ysela Bravo	21,901	13.6%
Democratic	Darrin Ryan Smith	20,462	12.7%
N/A	Other Write-Ins	92	0.1%

Maryland House of Delegates District 4 Republican Primary Election, 2022
Party	Candidate	Votes	%
Republican	Jesse T. Pippy	10,450	33.4%
Republican	April Fleming Miller	8,055	25.8%
Republican	Barrie S. Ciliberti	7,361	23.5%
Republican	Heath S. Barnes	5,398	17.3%

Maryland House of Delegates District 4 General Election, 2022
Party	Candidate	Votes	%
Republican	Jesse T. Pippy	30,670	19.1%
Republican	April Fleming Miller	29,717	18.5%
Republican	Barrie S. Ciliberti	29,705	18.5%
Democratic	Andrew Duck	24,489	15.2%
Democratic	Millicent A. Hall	23,361	14.5%
Democratic	Brandon Duck	22,628	14.1%
N/A	Other Write-Ins	93	0.1%
