= Workers' Revolutionary Party =

There are several groups named the Workers' Revolutionary Party:

- Workers' Revolutionary Party (Argentina)
- Workers Revolutionary Party (Greece)
- Workers Revolutionary Party (India)
- Workers' Revolutionary Party (Mexico)
- Workers Revolutionary Party (Namibia)
- Workers' Revolutionary Party (Nicaragua)
- Workers' Revolutionary Party (Panama)
- Workers' Revolutionary Party (Peru)
- Workers' Revolutionary Party (Portugal)
- Workers' Revolutionary Party (Spain)
- Workers Revolutionary Party (UK)

- Workers Revolutionary Party (Healy)
- Workers Revolutionary Party (Internationalist)
- Workers Revolutionary Party (Workers Press)

== See also ==
- Revolutionary Party (disambiguation)
- Revolutionary Workers Party (disambiguation)
