= 2022 Maryland county executive elections =

- November 8, 2022

8 of Maryland's 9 county executive seats
	Majority party	Minority party
Party	Democratic	Republican
Last election	6	3
Seats won	6	3
Seat change	Steady	Steady
Popular vote	939,636	465,037
Percentage	66.50%	32.91%
Democratic
50–60%
60–70%
70–80%
>90%
Republican
50–60%
60-70%

The Maryland county executive elections of 2022 were held on November 8, 2022. Democratic and Republican primaries were held on July 19, 2022.

Anne Arundel County, Baltimore County, Frederick County, Harford County, Howard County, Montgomery County, Prince George's County, and Wicomico County elected county executives.

== Race summary ==
County	County executive	Party	First elected	Last race	Status	Candidates
Anne Arundel County	Steuart Pittman	Democratic	2018	52.3% D	Incumbent re-elected.	▌Steuart Pittman (Democratic) 53.7%; ▌Jessica Haire (Republican) 46.1%
Baltimore County	Johnny Olszewski	Democratic	2018	57.8% D	Incumbent re-elected.	▌Johnny Olszewski (Democratic) 63.7%; ▌Pat McDonough (Republican) 36.1%
Frederick County	Jan Gardner	Democratic	2014	52.1% D	Incumbent term-limited. Democratic hold.	▌Jessica Fitzwater (Democratic) 50.4%; ▌Michael Hough (Republican) 49.5%
Harford County	Barry Glassman	Republican	2014	67.4% R	Incumbent term-limited. Republican hold.	▌Bob Cassilly (Republican) 64.1%; ▌Blaine Miller (Democratic) 35.6%
Howard County	Calvin Ball III	Democratic	2018	52.8% D	Incumbent re-elected.	▌Calvin Ball III (Democratic) 59.1%; ▌Allan Kittleman (Republican) 40.8%
Montgomery County	Marc Elrich	Democratic	2018	64.7% D	Incumbent re-elected.	▌Marc Elrich (Democratic) 75.1%; ▌Reardon Sullivan (Republican) 24.3%
Prince George's County	Angela Alsobrooks	Democratic	2018	98.9% D	Incumbent re-elected.	▌Angela Alsobrooks (Democratic) 98.7%
Wicomico County	John Psota	Republican	2020 (appointed)	48.7% R	Incumbent lost renomination. Republican hold.	▌Julie Giordano (Republican) 51.2%; ▌Ernest Davis (Democratic) 43.1%; ▌Muir Boda (Libertarian) 5.6%

== Anne Arundel County ==
2022 Anne Arundel County executive election

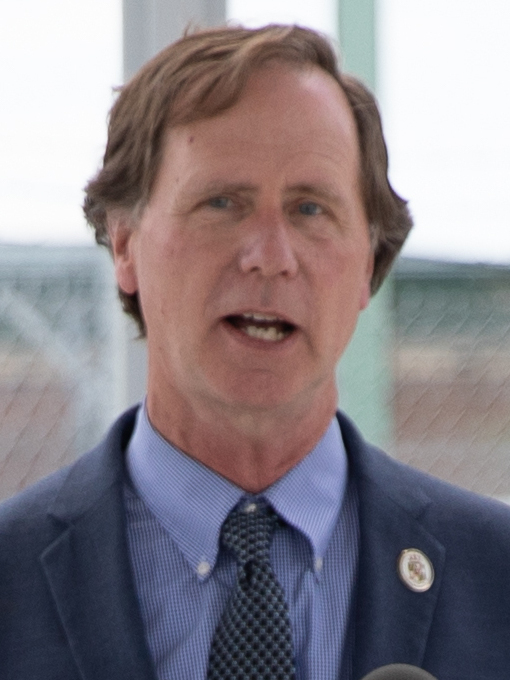

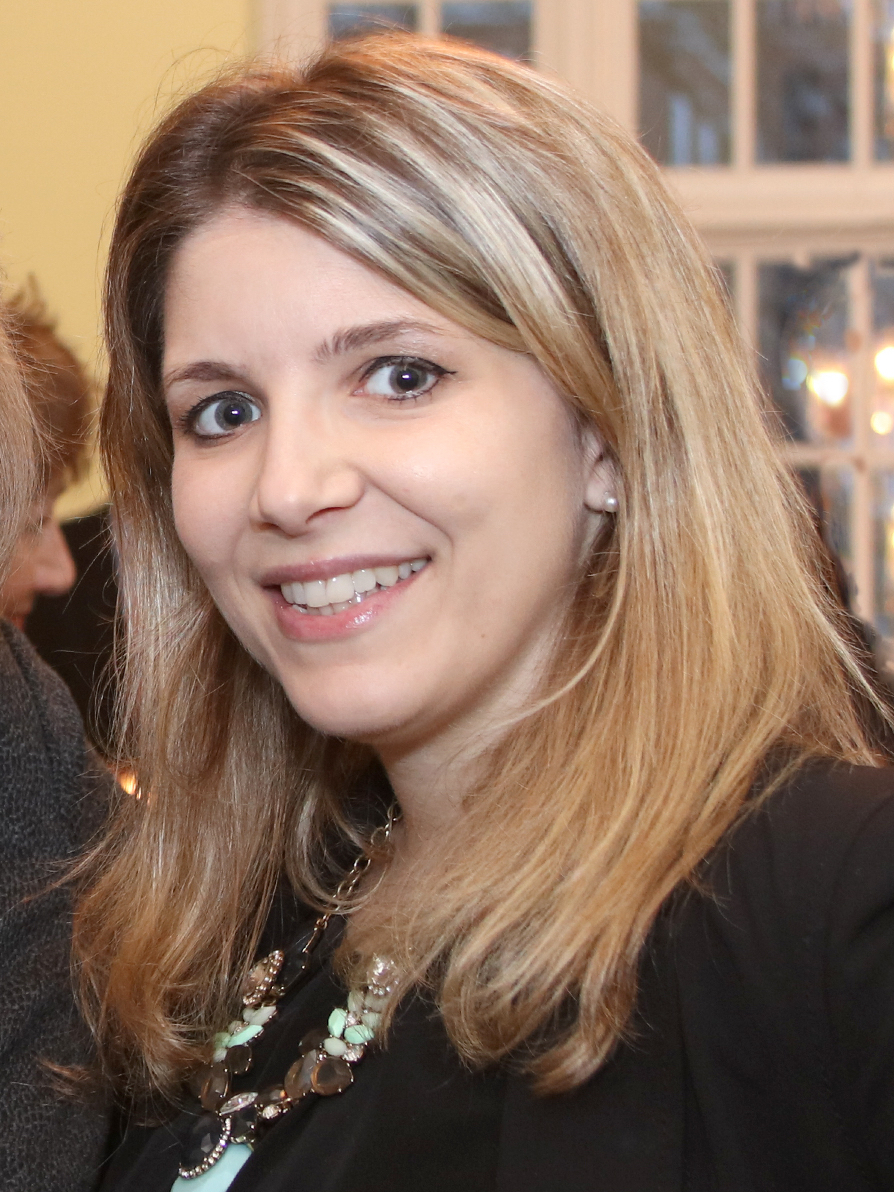
Nominee	Steuart Pittman	Jessica Haire
Party	Democratic	Republican
Popular vote	115,421	99,004
Percentage	53.74%	46.09%
- Precinct results Pittman: 40–50% 50–60% 60–70% 70–80% 80–90% Haire: 50–60% 60–70% 70–80% >90%
County Executive before election
Steuart Pittman
Democratic
Elected County Executive
Steuart Pittman
Democratic

The incumbent county executive was Democrat Steuart Pittman, who was elected in 2018 with 52.3 percent of the vote. He was eligible for re-election and was seeking a second term.

=== Democratic primary ===
==== Nominee ====
- Steuart Pittman, incumbent county executive

==== Endorsements ====
Steuart Pittman

Labor unions

- American Federation of State, County and Municipal Employees Local 67
- American Federation of Teachers Maryland
- Service Employees International Union Local 500
- Teachers Association of Anne Arundel County

Organizations

- CASA in Action
- Sierra Club Maryland

==== Fundraising ====
Primary campaign finance activity through July 3, 2022
Candidate	Raised	Spent	Cash on hand
Steuart Pittman	$769,410	$437,257	$573,782
Source: Maryland State Board of Elections

==== Results ====
Democratic primary results
Party	Candidate	Votes	%
Democratic	Steuart Pittman (incumbent)	43,130	100.0
Total votes		43,130	100.0

=== Republican primary ===
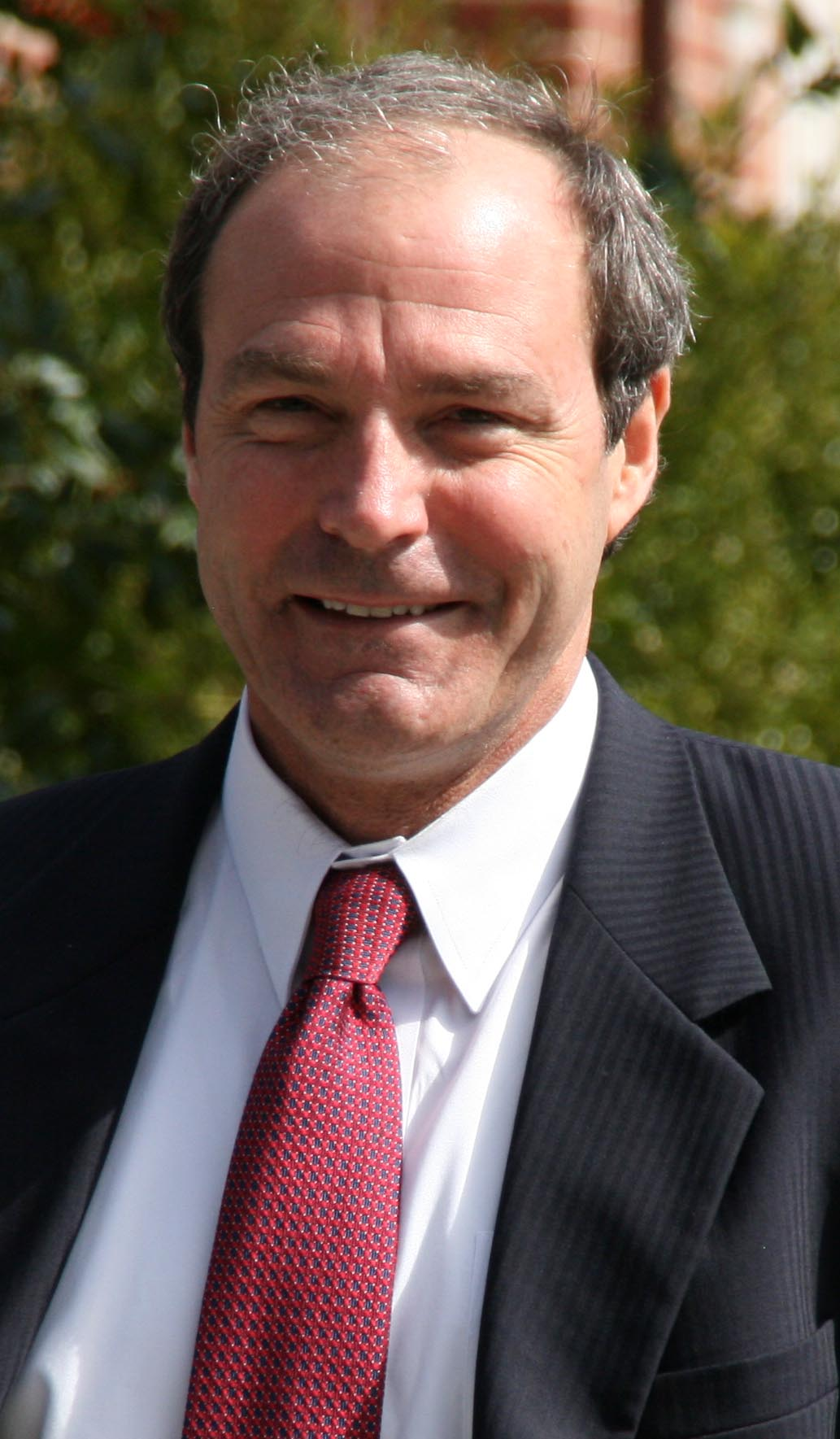
Former state delegate Herb McMillan finished second in the primary.

==== Nominee ====
- Jessica Haire, Anne Arundel County Councilmember (2018–present)

==== Eliminated in primary ====
- Fernando Berra, III
- John J. Grasso, former Anne Arundel County Councilmember (2010–2018)
- Chris Jahn, business consultant
- Herb McMillan, former state delegate for the 30th district (2011–2019)

==== Declined ====
- Sid Saab, state delegate for the 33rd district (ran for Maryland Senate)

==== Endorsements ====
Herb McMillan

State legislators

- Dan Cox, state delegate for the 4th district

Organizations

- Maryland Right to Life
- Stand for Health Freedom

==== Fundraising ====
Primary campaign finance activity through July 3, 2022
Candidate	Raised	Spent	Cash on hand
Fernando Berra	<$1,000	<$1,000	N/A
John Grasso	$31,141	$18,859	$12,381
Jessica Haire	$1,442,271	$1,150,543	$414,641
Chris Jahn	$4,905	$3,390	$1,516
Herb McMillan	$376,739	$329,360	$74,902
Source: Maryland State Board of Elections

==== Polling ====
Poll source	Date(s) administered	Sample size (Note: Key: A – all adults RV – registered voters LV – likely voters V – unclear)	Margin of error	Jessica Haire	Herbert McMillan	Undecided
The Tarrance Group (R) (Note: Poll was sponsored by Haire's campaign)	January 10–12, 2022	300 (LV)	± 5.8%	38%	24%	39%

==== Results ====
Results by precinct Haire: 30–40%; 40–50%; 50–60%; McMillan: 30–40%; 40–50%; 50–60%; 60–70%; Tie: 40–50%

Republican primary results
Party	Candidate	Votes	%
Republican	Jessica Haire	16,358	44.4
Republican	Herb McMillan	14,292	38.8
Republican	John J. Grasso	4,361	11.8
Republican	Fernando Berra III	1,124	3.1
Republican	Chris Jahn	752	2.0
Total votes		36,887	100.0

=== General election ===
==== Post-primary endorsements ====
Steuart Pittman (D)

Individuals

- Wes Moore, investment banker, author, television producer, and Democratic nominee for governor of Maryland in 2022

Labor unions

- Anne Arundel Fraternal Order of Police
- International Brotherhood of Electrical Workers Local 26

Organizations

- Planned Parenthood Advocates for D.C., Maryland & NoVa PAC

Newspapers

- The Baltimore Sun
Declined to endorse

State legislators

- Herb McMillan, former state delegate for the 30th district (2011–2019) and candidate for county executive in 2022 (Republican)

==== Fundraising ====
Primary campaign finance activity through November 15, 2022
Candidate	Raised	Spent	Cash on hand
Steuart Pittman	$1,408,120	$1,642,074	$7,676
Jessica Haire	$2,180,607	$2,283,639	$19,881
Source: Maryland State Board of Elections

==== Polling ====
Poll source	Date(s) administered	Sample size	Margin of error	Steuart Pittman	Jessica Haire	Other	Undecided
University of Baltimore	October 20–23, 2022	989 (LV)	± 3.1%	48%	40%	4% (Note: "Prefer not to say" with 4%)	8%
Anne Arundel Community College	September 23 – October 1, 2022	468 (RV)	± 4.5%	31%	33%	–	36%
Change Research (D) (Note: Poll was sponsored by Future Anne Arundel, which supports Pittman)	September 14–18, 2022	931 (LV)	± 3.6%	41%	45%	–	14%

==== Results ====
Anne Arundel County Executive election, 2022
Party	Candidate	Votes	%	±%
Democratic	Steuart Pittman (incumbent)	115,421	53.74%	+1.44
Republican	Jessica Haire	99,004	46.09%	−1.50
Write-in		369	0.17%	+0.06
Total votes		214,794	100.00%	
Democratic hold				

== Baltimore County ==
2022 Baltimore County executive election

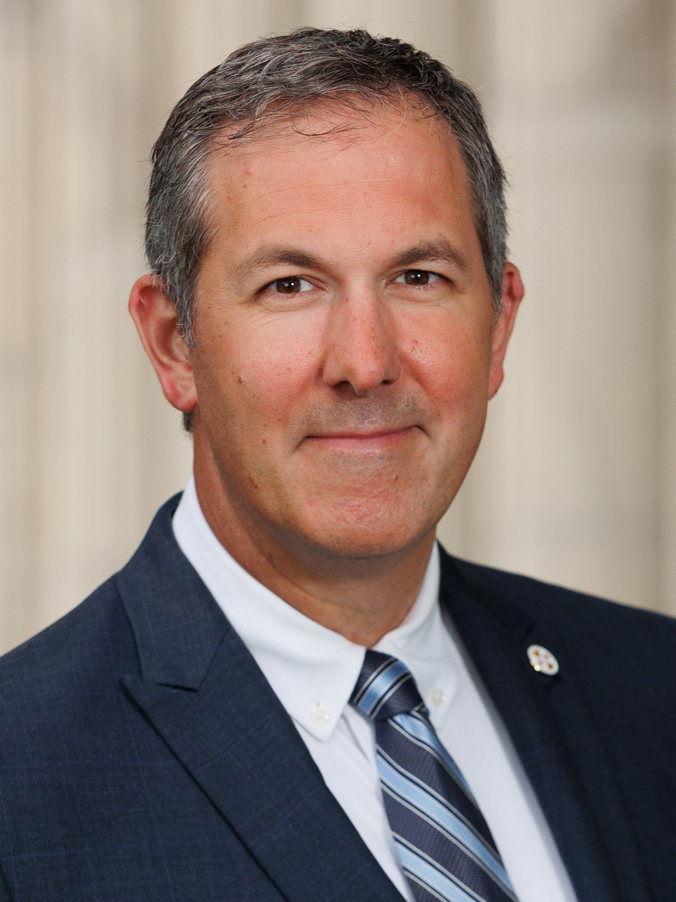

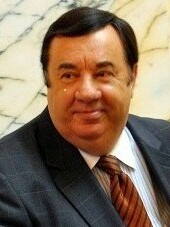
Nominee	Johnny Olszewski	Pat McDonough
Party	Democratic	Republican
Popular vote	173,159	98,160
Percentage	63.68%	36.10%
- Precinct results Olszewski: 50–60% 60–70% 70–80% 80–90% >90% McDonough: 50–60% 60–70% 70–80%
County Executive before election
Johnny Olszewski
Democratic
Elected County Executive
Johnny Olszewski
Democratic

The incumbent county executive was Democrat Johnny Olszewski, who was elected in 2018 with 57.8 percent of the vote. He was eligible for re-election and was seeking a second term.

=== Democratic primary ===
==== Nominee ====
- Johnny Olszewski, incumbent county executive

==== Eliminated in primary ====
- Adam Reuter

==== Endorsements ====
Johnny Olszewski

Labor unions

- American Federation of State, County and Municipal Employees Local 67
- American Federation of Teachers Maryland
- Service Employees International Union Local 500

Organizations

- CASA in Action
- Sierra Club Maryland

==== Fundraising ====
Primary campaign finance activity through July 3, 2022
Candidate	Raised	Spent	Cash on hand
Johnny Olszewski	$766,598	$406,095	$1,976,576
Adam Reuter	$611	$627	-$16
Source: Maryland State Board of Elections

==== Results ====
Democratic primary results
Party	Candidate	Votes	%
Democratic	Johnny Olszewski (incumbent)	80,607	86.4
Democratic	Adam Reuter	12,656	13.6
Total votes		93,263	100.0

=== Republican primary ===
==== Nominee ====
- Pat McDonough, former state delegate for the 7th district (2003–2019) and candidate for county executive in 2018

==== Eliminated in primary ====
- Darren M. Badillo, community activist
- Henry Ciezkowski
- Thilo August Albert Gluck, owner and president of Phoenix Engineering
- A. Scott Pappas
- Kimberley Stansbury

==== Endorsements ====
Darren Badillo

Organizations

- Stand for Health Freedom
A. Scott Pappas

Organizations

- Maryland Right to Life

==== Fundraising ====
Primary campaign finance activity through July 3, 2022
Candidate	Raised	Spent	Cash on hand
Darren Badillo	$15,546	$14,466	$1,080
Henry Ciezkowski	$6,930	$5,548	$1,382
Thilo Gluck	$4,158	$2,690	$1,468
Pat McDonough	$8,310	$5,562	$2,748
A. Scott Pappas	<$1,000	<$1,000	N/A
Kimberley Stansbury	$6,520	$5,560	$960
Source: Maryland State Board of Elections

==== Results ====
Republican primary results
Party	Candidate	Votes	%
Republican	Pat McDonough	14,041	41.0
Republican	Kimberley Stansbury	5,769	16.8
Republican	Henry Ciezkowski	5,635	16.4
Republican	Darren M. Badillo	4,370	12.8
Republican	A. Scott Pappas	3,081	9.0
Republican	Thilo August Albert Gluck	1,389	4.1
Total votes		28,064	100.0

=== General election ===
==== Post-primary endorsements ====
Johnny Olszewski (D)

Organizations

- Planned Parenthood Action Fund
- Pro-Choice Maryland

Newspapers

- Baltimore Afro-American
- The Baltimore Sun
Pat McDonough (R)

Organizations

- Maryland Right to Life

==== Fundraising ====
Primary campaign finance activity through November 15, 2022
Candidate	Raised	Spent	Cash on hand
Johnny Olszewski	$1,026,265	$971,243	$1,671,095
Pat McDonough	$42,208	$33,977	$8,231
Source: Maryland State Board of Elections

==== Results ====
Baltimore County Executive election, 2022
Party	Candidate	Votes	%	±%
Democratic	Johnny Olszewski (incumbent)	173,159	63.68%	+5.85
Republican	Pat McDonough	98,160	36.10%	−5.93
Write-in		613	0.23%	+0.09
Total votes		271,932	100.00%	
Democratic hold				

== Frederick County ==
2022 Frederick County executive election
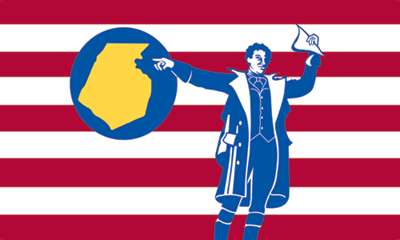

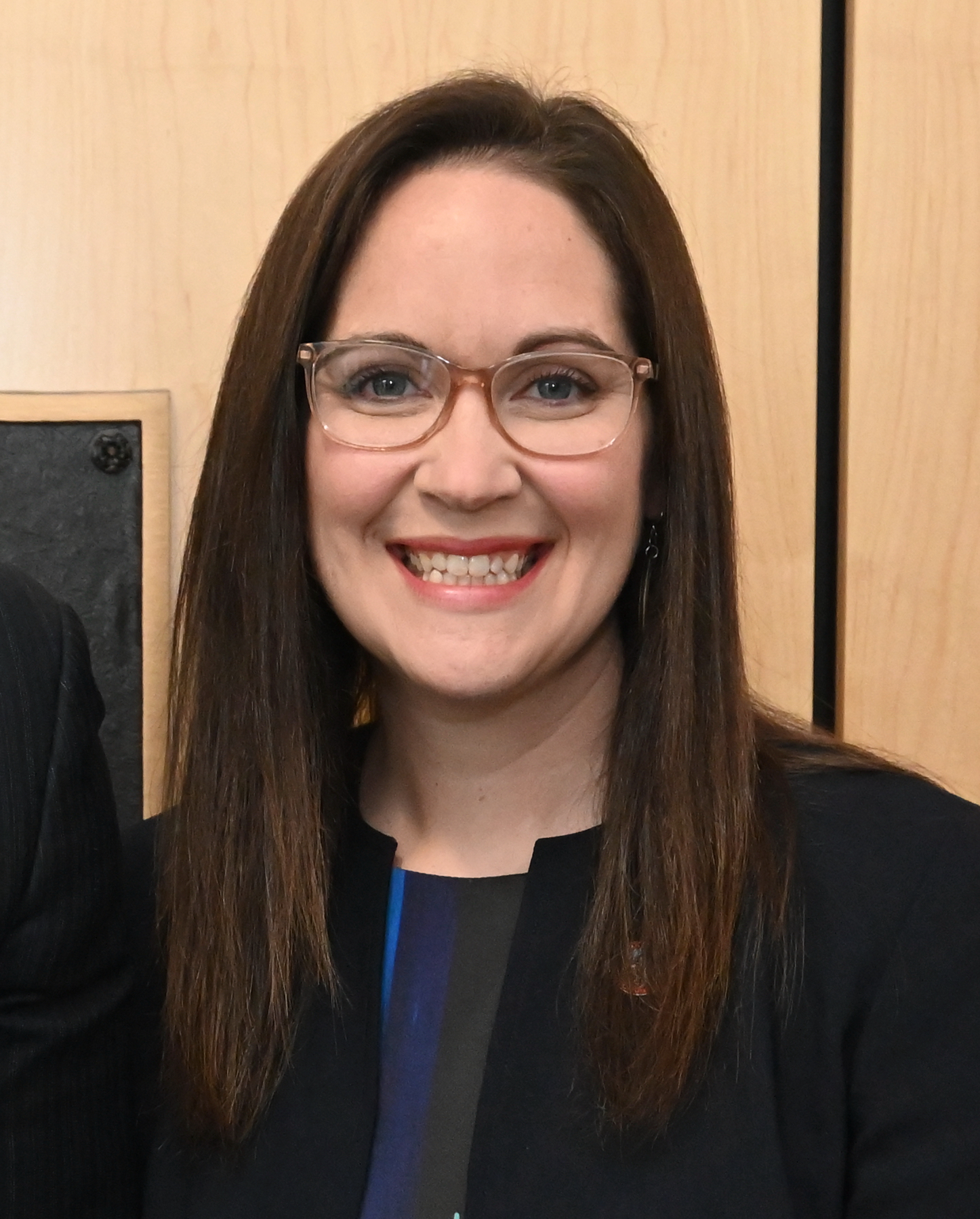

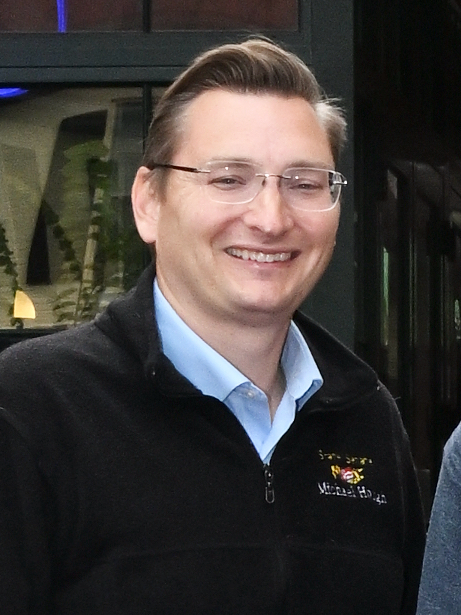
Nominee	Jessica Fitzwater	Michael Hough
Party	Democratic	Republican
Popular vote	53,291	52,302
Percentage	50.40%	49.46%
- Precinct results Fitzwater: 50–60% 60–70% 70–80% Hough: 50–60% 60–70% 70–80%
County Executive before election
Jan Gardner
Democratic
Elected County Executive
Jessica Fitzwater
Democratic

Incumbent two-term Democratic county executive Jan Gardner was term-limited and could not seek re-election to a third consecutive term.

=== Democratic primary ===
==== Nominee ====
- Jessica Fitzwater, Frederick County Councilmember (2014–present)

==== Eliminated in primary ====
- Daryl A. Boffman, former School Board Member (2002–2010)
- Kai John Hagen, Frederick County Councilmember (2018–present)

==== Declined ====
- Jerry Donald, county councilmember (2014–present) (ran for re-election)

==== Endorsements ====
Jessica Fitzwater

Labor unions

- Frederick Association of School Support Employees
- Frederick County Administrative and Supervisory Association
- Frederick County Teachers Association

==== Fundraising ====
Primary campaign finance activity through July 3, 2022
Candidate	Raised	Spent	Cash on hand
Daryl Boffman	$87,139	$67,314	$19,825
Jessica Fitzwater	$194,626	$115,594	$137,804
Kai John Hagen	$144,754	$160,840	$49,634
Source: Maryland State Board of Elections

==== Results ====
Results by precinct Fitzwater: 40–50%; 50–60%; 60–70%; >90%; Hagen: 40–50%; Boffman: 60–70%

Democratic primary results
Party	Candidate	Votes	%
Democratic	Jessica Fitzwater	13,505	58.3
Democratic	Kai John Hagen	6,732	29.1
Democratic	Daryl A. Boffman	2,919	12.6
Total votes		23,156	100.0

=== Republican primary ===
==== Nominee ====
- Michael Hough, state senator for the 4th district (2015–present)

==== Endorsements ====
Michael Hough

Organizations

- Maryland Right to Life

==== Fundraising ====
Primary campaign finance activity through July 3, 2022
Candidate	Raised	Spent	Cash on hand
Michael Hough	$478,110	$191,554	$486,247
Source: Maryland State Board of Elections

==== Results ====
Republican primary results
Party	Candidate	Votes	%
Republican	Michael Joseph Hough	17,209	100.0
Total votes		17,209	100.0

=== General election ===
==== Post-primary endorsements ====
Jessica Fitzwater (D)

State legislators

- Dalya Attar, state delegate for the 41st district (2019–present)
- Ben Brooks, state delegate for the 10th district (2015–present)
- Luke Clippinger, state delegate for the 46th district (2011–present)
- Bill Ferguson, 86th president of the Maryland Senate (2020–present) and state senator for the 46th district (2011–present)
- Adrienne A. Jones, 107th Speaker of the Maryland House of Delegates (2019–present) and state delegate for the 10th district (1997–present)
- Marc Korman, state delegate from the 16th district (2015–present)
- Robbyn Lewis, state delegate for the 46th district (2017–present)
- Cory V. McCray, state senator for the 45th district (2019–present)
- Maggie McIntosh, state delegate for the 43rd district (2003–present)
- Aruna Miller, former state delegate from the 15th district (2010–2019), candidate for Maryland's 6th congressional district in 2018, and nominee for lieutenant governor in 2022
- David Moon, state delegate from the 20th district (2015–present)

Local officials

- Johnny Olszewski, 14th Executive of Baltimore County (2018–present) and former state delegate for the 6th district (2006–2015)
- Brandon Scott, 53rd mayor of Baltimore (2020–present)

Individuals

- Wes Moore, author and former CEO of the Robin Hood Foundation and nominee for governor in 2022

Labor unions

- International Brotherhood of Electrical Workers Local 24
- International Brotherhood of Electrical Workers Local 26
- International Brotherhood of Electrical Workers Local 307
- International Brotherhood of Electrical Workers Local 44
- Maryland State Education Association

Organizations

- Planned Parenthood Action Fund
- Sierra Club Maryland
Michael Hough (R)

Statewide officials

- Larry Hogan, 62nd governor of Maryland (2015–present)

State legislators

- Jill P. Carter, state senator for the 41st district (2018–present) (Democratic)
- Joseph F. Vallario Jr., former state delegate for district 23B (1975–2019) (Democratic)
- Robert Zirkin, former state senator for the 11th district (2007–2020) (Democratic)

==== Fundraising ====
Primary campaign finance activity through November 15, 2022
Candidate	Raised	Spent	Cash on hand
Jessica Fitzwater	$620,034	$644,596	$34,210
Michael Hough	$879,192	$1,060,624	$18,259
Source: Maryland State Board of Elections

==== Results ====
Frederick County Executive election, 2022
Party	Candidate	Votes	%	±%
Democratic	Jessica Fitzwater	53,291	50.40%	−1.74
Republican	Michael Joseph Hough	52,302	49.46%	+6.33
Write-in		147	0.14%	+0.04
Total votes		105,740	100.0	
Democratic hold				

== Harford County ==
2022 Harford County executive election

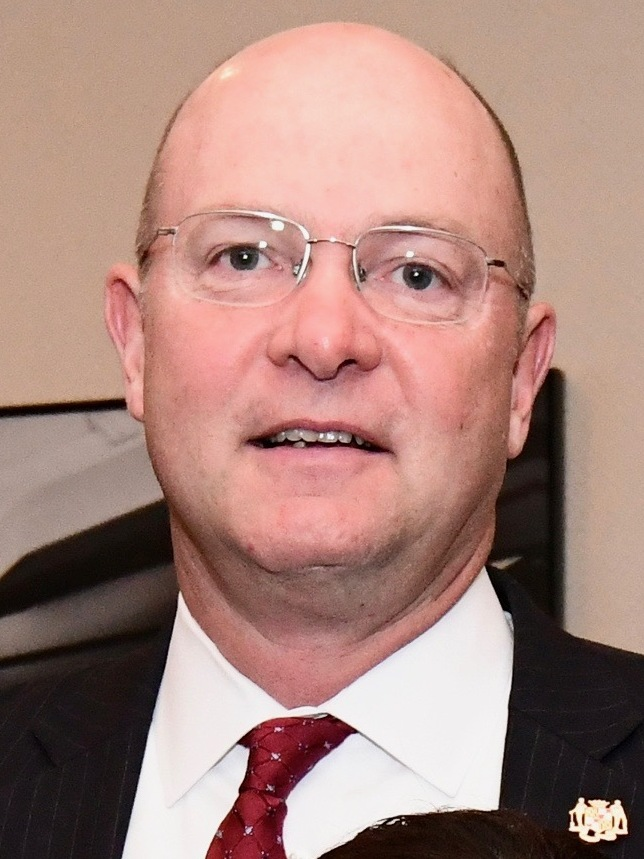

Nominee	Bob Cassilly	Blaine Miller
Party	Republican	Democratic
Popular vote	65,490	36,408
Percentage	64.10%	35.64%
- Precinct results Cassilly: 50–60% 60–70% 70–80% 80–90% Miller: 40–50% 50–60% 60–70% 70–80%
County Executive before election
Barry Glassman
Republican
Elected County Executive
Bob Cassilly
Republican

Incumbent Republican county executive Barry Glassman was term-limited and was running for Comptroller of Maryland in 2022.

=== Republican primary ===
==== Nominee ====
- Bob Cassilly, state senator for the 34th district (2015–present)

==== Eliminated in primary ====
- Billy Boniface, senior advisor to County Executive Barry Glassman

==== Endorsements ====
Robert Cassilly

Organizations

- Maryland Right to Life

==== Fundraising ====
Primary campaign finance activity through July 3, 2022
Candidate	Raised	Spent	Cash on hand
Billy Boniface	$546,855	$598,685	$55,930
Robert Cassilly	$459,794	$444,963	$113,318
Source: Maryland State Board of Elections

==== Results ====
Republican primary results
Party	Candidate	Votes	%
Republican	Bob Cassilly	19,626	66.5
Republican	Billy Boniface	9,879	33.5
Total votes		29,505	100.0

=== Democratic primary ===
==== Nominee ====
- Blane H. Miller, III

==== Fundraising ====
Primary campaign finance activity through July 3, 2022
Candidate	Raised	Spent	Cash on hand
Blane Miller	$3,510	$3,500	$10
Source: Maryland State Board of Elections

==== Results ====
Democratic primary results
Party	Candidate	Votes	%
Democratic	Blane H. Miller, III	14,620	100.0
Total votes		14,620	100.0

=== General election ===
==== Post-primary endorsements ====
Robert Cassilly (R)

Newspapers

- The Baltimore Sun

==== Fundraising ====
Primary campaign finance activity through November 15, 2022
Candidate	Raised	Spent	Cash on hand
Bob Cassilly	$720,750	$758,071	$61,166
Blane Miller	$4,010	$4,000	$10
Source: Maryland State Board of Elections

==== Results ====
Harford County Executive election, 2022
Party	Candidate	Votes	%	±%
Republican	Bob Cassilly	65,490	64.10%	−3.27
Democratic	Blane H. Miller, III	36,408	35.64%	+3.22
Write-in		268	0.26%	+0.04
Total votes		102,166	100.00%	
Republican hold				

== Howard County ==
2022 Howard County executive election

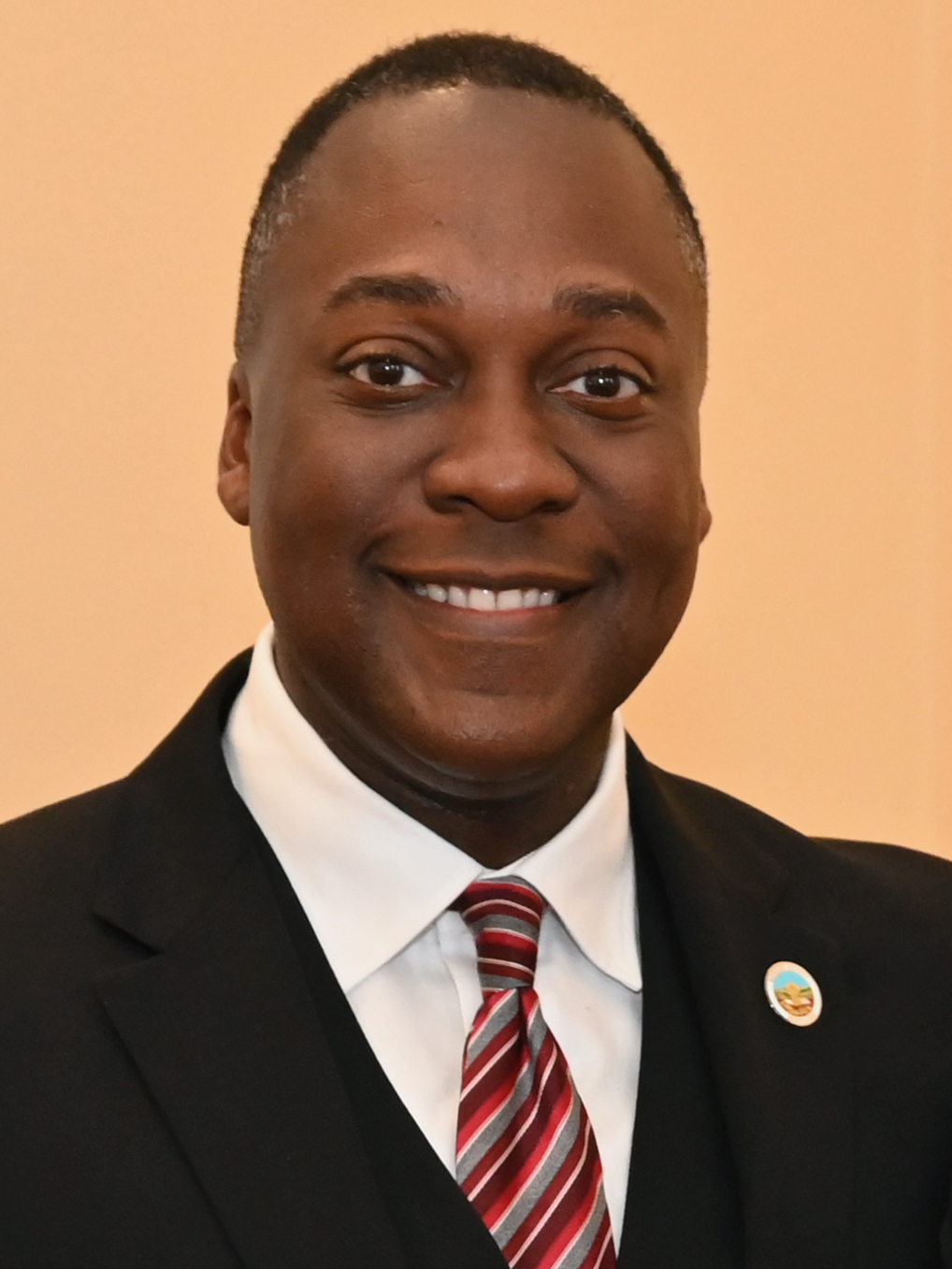

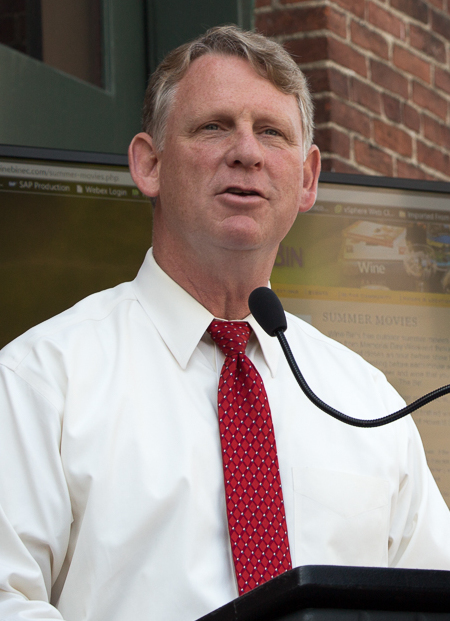
Nominee	Calvin Ball III	Allan Kittleman
Party	Democratic	Republican
Popular vote	76,947	53,162
Percentage	59.07%	40.81%
- Precinct results Ball: 40–50% 50–60% 60–70% 70–80% Kittleman: 50–60% 60–70% 70–80%
County Executive before election
Calvin Ball III
Democratic
Elected County Executive
Calvin Ball III
Democratic

The incumbent county executive was Democrat Calvin Ball III, who was elected in 2018 with 52.8 percent of the vote. He was eligible for re-election and was seeking a second term.

=== Democratic primary ===
==== Nominee ====
- Calvin Ball III, incumbent county executive

==== Eliminated in primary ====
- Harry Dunbar, candidate for county executive in 2018

==== Endorsements ====
Calvin Ball III

Labor unions

- American Federation of State, County and Municipal Employees Local 67
- American Federation of Teachers Maryland
- Fraternal Order of Police Lodge 21

Organizations

- Sierra Club Maryland

==== Fundraising ====
Primary campaign finance activity through July 3, 2022
Candidate	Raised	Spent	Cash on hand
Calvin Ball	$531,002	$358,039	$864,930
Harry Dunbar	$80	$0	$5,911
Source: Maryland State Board of Elections

==== Results ====
Democratic primary results
Party	Candidate	Votes	%
Democratic	Calvin Ball III (incumbent)	34,555	87.1
Democratic	Harry Dunbar	5,129	12.9
Total votes		39,684	100.0

=== Republican primary ===
==== Nominee ====
- Allan H. Kittleman, former county executive (2014–2018)

==== Eliminated in primary ====
- Molsen Haghighat
- Darren Vilus

==== Fundraising ====
Primary campaign finance activity through July 3, 2022
Candidate	Raised	Spent	Cash on hand
Molsen Haghighat	<$1,000	<$1,000	N/A
Allan Kittleman	$784,055	$157,424	$626,631
Source: Maryland State Board of Elections

==== Results ====
Republican primary results
Party	Candidate	Votes	%
Republican	Allan H. Kittleman	13,738	94.2
Republican	Darren Vilus	458	3.1
Republican	Molsen Haghighat	385	2.6
Total votes		14,581	100.0

=== General election ===
==== Post-primary endorsements ====
Calvin Ball III (D)

Organizations

- Planned Parenthood Action Fund
- Pro-Choice Maryland

Newspapers

- Baltimore Afro-American
- The Baltimore Sun

==== Fundraising ====
Primary campaign finance activity through November 15, 2022
Candidate	Raised	Spent	Cash on hand
Calvin Ball	$1,117,852	$1,623,727	$186,092
Allan Kittleman	$1,032,244	$1,003,878	$28,366
Source: Maryland State Board of Elections

==== Results ====
Howard County Executive election, 2022
Party	Candidate	Votes	%	±%
Democratic	Calvin Ball III (incumbent)	76,947	59.07%	+6.28
Republican	Allan H. Kittleman	53,162	40.81%	−6.31
Write-in		162	0.12%	+0.03
Total votes		130,271	100.00%	
Democratic hold				

== Montgomery County ==
2022 Montgomery County executive election

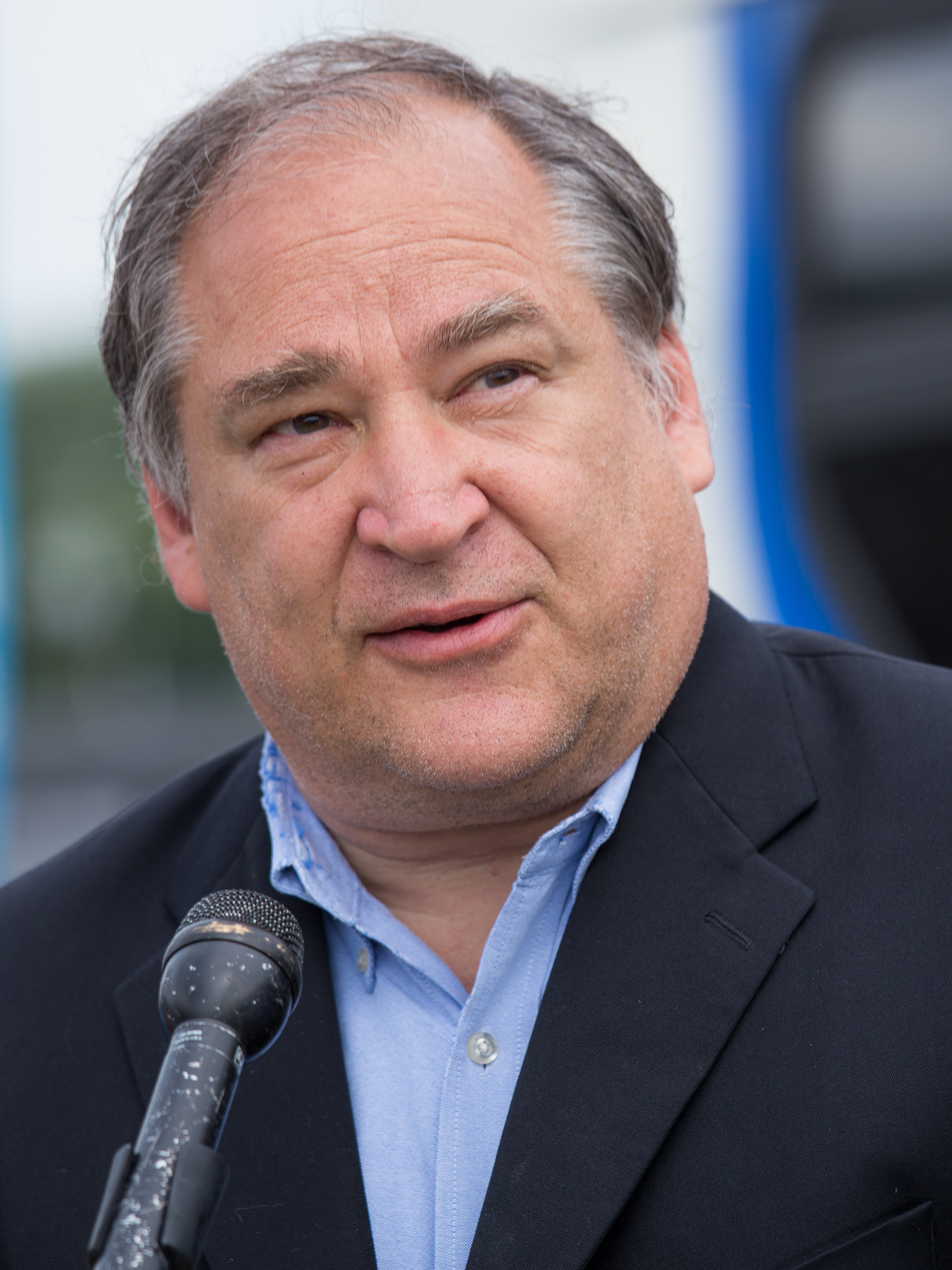

Nominee	Marc Elrich	Reardon Sullivan
Party	Democratic	Republican
Popular vote	251,897	81,410
Percentage	75.11%	24.27%
- Precinct results Elrich: 50–60% 60–70% 70–80% 80–90% >90% Sullivan: 50–60%
County Executive before election
Marc Elrich
Democratic
Elected County Executive
Marc Elrich
Democratic

The incumbent county executive was Democrat Marc Elrich, who was elected in 2018 with 64.3 percent of the vote. He was eligible for re-election and was seeking a second term.

=== Democratic primary ===
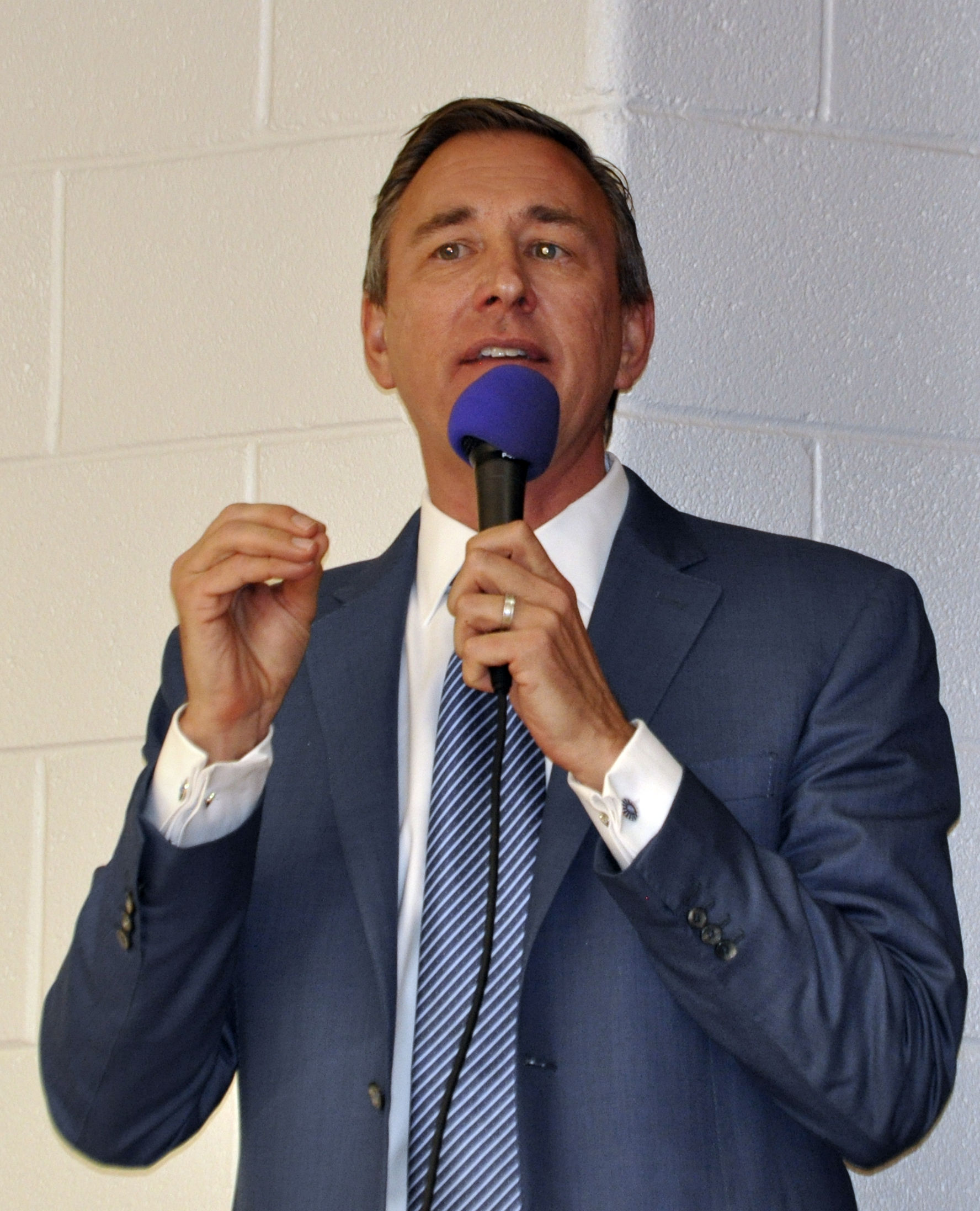
Businessman David Blair finished second in the primary.

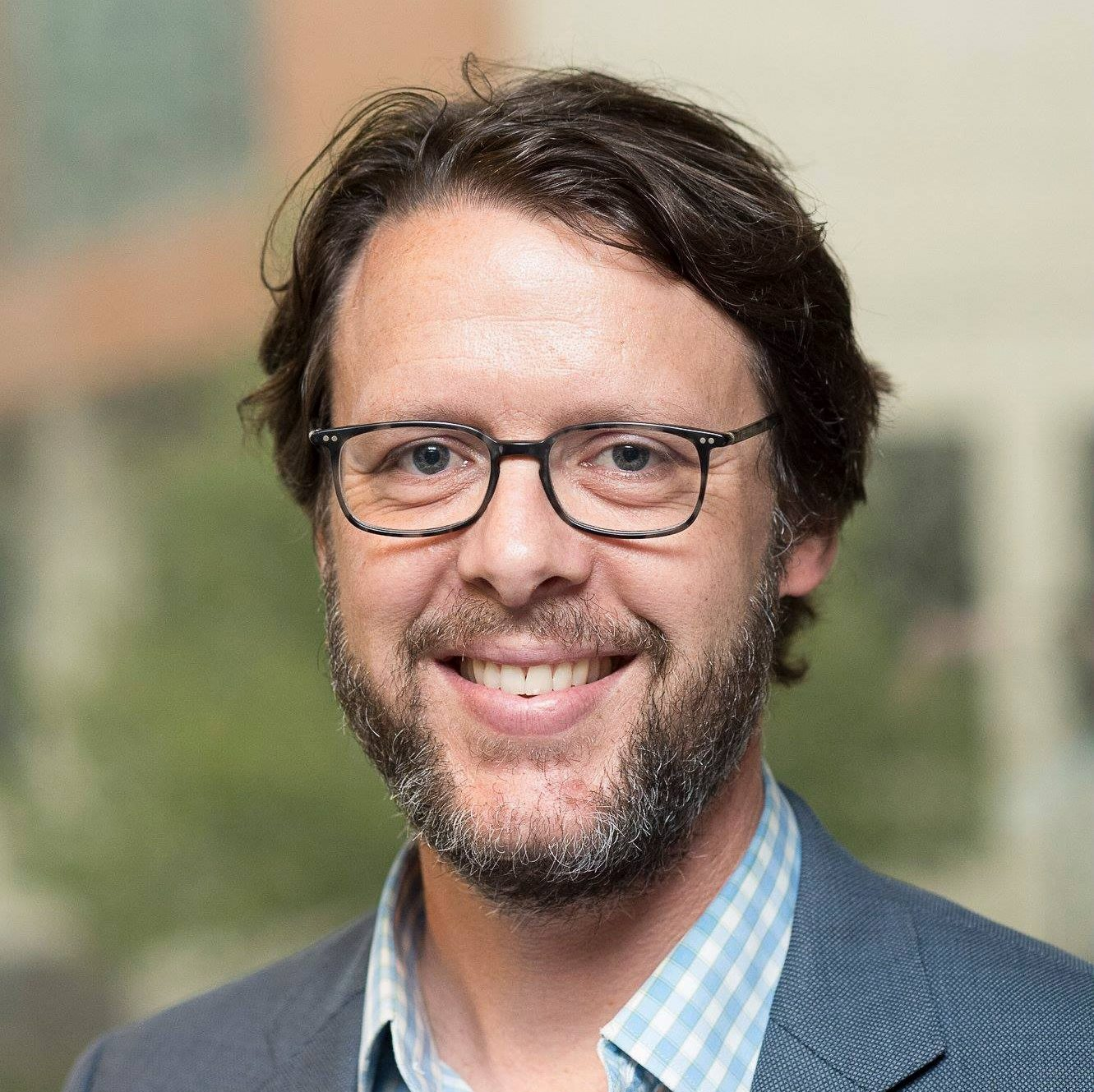
County councilmember Hans Riemer finished third in the primary.

==== Nominee ====
- Marc Elrich, incumbent county executive

==== Eliminated in primary ====
- David T. Blair, president of Council for Advocacy and Policy Solutions and candidate for county executive in 2018
- Peter James, tech worker
- Hans Riemer, Montgomery County Councilmember (2010–present)

==== Endorsements ====
David Blair

U.S. representatives

- Michael Barnes, former U.S. representative for Maryland's 8th congressional district (1979–1987)
- John Delaney, former U.S. representative for Maryland's 6th congressional district (2013–2019) and candidate for President in 2020

State legislators

- Brian Feldman, state senator for the 15th district (2013–present)
- Cheryl Kagan, state senator for the 17th district (2015–present)
- Nancy J. King, Majority Leader of the Maryland Senate (2020–present) and state senator for the 39th district (2007–present)
- Lily Qi, state delegate for the 15th district (2019–present)

Local officials

- Valerie Ervin, former senior advisor to the Working Families Party, former Montgomery County Councilmember (2006–2014), and candidate for governor in 2018
- Nancy Floreen, former Montgomery County councilmember (2002–2018) (Independent)
- Nancy Navarro, Montgomery County Councilmember (2009–present)

Individuals

- Dorothy Bush Koch, sister of former President George W. Bush (Republican)

Organizations

- Greater Capital Area Association of Realtors (co-endorsement with Sullivan)
- Montgomery County Sierra Club

Newspapers

- The Washington Post (Democratic primary only)
Marc Elrich

U.S. representatives

- Jamie Raskin, U.S. representative for Maryland's 8th congressional district (2017–present)

Statewide officials

- Brian Frosh, Attorney General of Maryland (2015–present)
- Nancy Kopp, former Treasurer of Maryland (2002–2021)

State legislators

- Gabriel Acevero, state delegate for the 39th district (2019–present)
- Benjamin F. Kramer, state senator for the 19th district (2019–present)
- Susan C. Lee, state senator for the 16th district (2015–present)
- Vaughn Stewart, state delegate for the 19th district (2019–present)

Labor unions

- 1199SEIU
- 32BJ SEIU
- American Federation of State, County and Municipal Employees Local 67
- American Federation of Teachers Maryland
- Maryland State and District of Columbia AFL–CIO
- Montgomery County Education Association
- Montgomery County Volunteer Fire-Rescue Association
- National Nurses United
- SEIU Maryland/DC Division
- Service Employees International Union 32BJ
- Service Employees International Union Local 500
- United Food and Commercial Workers
- United Food and Commercial Workers Local 1994 MCGEO

Organizations

- CASA In Action
- Our Revolution Maryland
Hans Riemer

Statewide officials

- Parris Glendening, 59th governor of Maryland (1995–2003)

Individuals

- Mike Tidwell, founder and director of the Chesapeake Climate Action Network
- Matthew Yglesias, journalist

==== Fundraising ====
Primary campaign finance activity through July 3, 2022
Candidate	Raised	Spent	Cash on hand
David Blair	$5,226,370	$5,065,163	$161,207
Marc Elrich	$907,587	$522,033	$340,461
Peter James	<$1,000	<$1,000	N/A
Hans Riemer	$942,661	$604,730	$309,187
Source: Maryland State Board of Elections

==== Polling ====
Poll source	Date(s) administered	Sample size	Margin of error	David Blair	Marc Elrich	Peter James	Hans Riemer	Undecided
Data for Progress (D)	July 8–12, 2022	446 (LV)	± 5.0%	34%	34%	1%	20%	11%
Garin-Hart-Yang Research Group (D) (Note: This poll was sponsored by Blair's campaign)	July 5–6, 2022	504 (LV)	± 4.5%	28%	29%	1%	19%	23%
Gonzales Research (D) (Note: This poll was sponsored by Progressives for Progress, which supports Blair)	June 30 – July 3, 2022	329 (LV)	± 5.5%	27%	33%	1%	15%	24%
Data for Progress (D)	June 30 – July 1, 2022	461 (LV)	± 5.0%	20%	41%	0%	18%	20%
Gonzales Research (D)	June 2022	– (LV)	–	20%	45%	–	15%	–
Data for Progress (D)	May 19–23, 2022	529 (LV)	± 4.0%	14%	33%	1%	14%	38%

==== Results ====
Results by precinct Elrich: 30–40%; 40–50%; 50–60%; 60–70%; Blair: 30–40%; 40–50%; 50–60%; 60–70%; Riemer: 30–40%; 80–90%; Tie: 40–50%

Democratic primary results
Party	Candidate	Votes	%
Democratic	Marc Elrich (incumbent)	55,504	39.20
Democratic	David T. Blair	55,472	39.18
Democratic	Hans Riemer	28,193	19.91
Democratic	Peter James	2,429	1.71
Total votes		141,598	100.0

=== Republican primary ===
==== Nominee ====
- Reardon Sullivan, Montgomery County Republican committee chair

==== Eliminated in primary ====
- Shelly Skolnick, perennial candidate

==== Endorsements ====
Reardon Sullivan

Organizations

- Greater Capital Area Association of Realtors (co-endorsement with Blair)

==== Fundraising ====
Primary campaign finance activity through July 3, 2022
Candidate	Raised	Spent	Cash on hand
Shelly Skolnick	<$1,000	<$1,000	N/A
Reardon Sullivan	$30,230	$18,568	$11,662
Source: Maryland State Board of Elections

==== Results ====
Republican primary results
Party	Candidate	Votes	%
Republican	Reardon Sullivan	12,695	63.03
Republican	Shelly Skolnick	7,447	36.97
Total votes		20,142	100.0

=== Green convention ===
==== Failed to qualify ====
- Devin Battley, motorcycle racer (not nominated by party)

==== Fundraising ====
Primary campaign finance activity through July 3, 2022
Candidate	Raised	Spent	Cash on hand
Devin Battley	$0	$0	$0
Source: Maryland State Board of Elections

=== General election ===
==== Post-primary endorsements ====
Marc Elrich (D)

Local officials

- Tom Hucker, Montgomery County councilmember (2014–present)
- Sidney A. Katz, Montgomery County councilmember (2014–present)
- Nancy Navarro, Montgomery County councilmember (2009–present)
- Craig L. Rice, Montgomery County councilmember (2010–present)
- Hans Riemer, Montgomery County councilmember (2010–present)

Labor unions

- International Brotherhood of Electrical Workers Local 26

Organizations

- Montgomery County Sierra Club
- Planned Parenthood Action Fund
- Sierra Club Maryland

==== Fundraising ====
Primary campaign finance activity through November 15, 2022
Candidate	Raised	Spent	Cash on hand
Marc Elrich	$1,080,384	$1,023,860	$11,430
Reardon Sullivan	$99,771	$97,821	$1,950
Source: Maryland State Board of Elections

==== Results ====
Montgomery County Executive election, 2022
Party	Candidate	Votes	%	±%
Democratic	Marc Elrich (incumbent)	251,897	75.11%	+10.37
Republican	Reardon Sullivan	81,410	24.27%	+8.06
Write-in		2,083	0.62%	+0.52
Total votes		335,390	100.00%	
Democratic hold				

== Prince George's County ==
2022 Prince George's County executive election

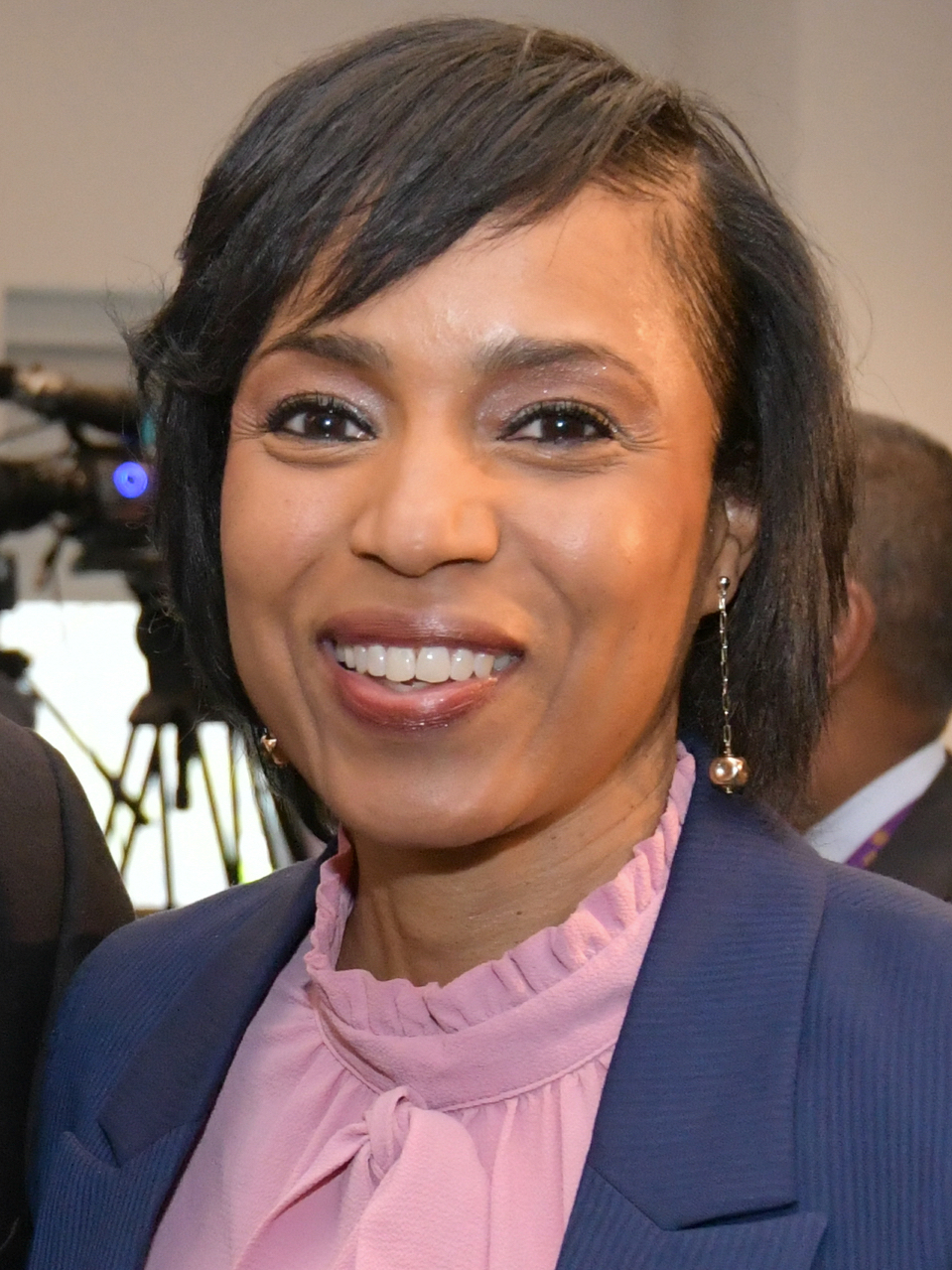
Nominee	Angela Alsobrooks
Party	Democratic
Popular vote	219,453
Percentage	98.65%
County Executive before election
Angela Alsobrooks
Democratic
Elected County Executive
Angela Alsobrooks
Democratic

The incumbent county executive was Democrat Angela Alsobrooks, who was elected in 2018 with 98.9 percent of the vote. She was eligible for re-election and was seeking a second term.

=== Democratic primary ===
==== Nominee ====
- Angela Alsobrooks, incumbent county executive

==== Eliminated in primary ====
- Leigh Bodden, former cornerback for the Cleveland Browns, Detroit Lions, and the New England Patriots
- Billy W. Bridges, candidate for county executive in 2018
- Sherman R. Hardy, veteran and activist
- Moisette Tonya Sweat, vice president of the South County Economic Development Association

==== Endorsements ====
Angela Alsobrooks

U.S. representatives

- Steny Hoyer, House Majority Leader (2007–2011, 2019–present) and U.S. Representative for Maryland's fifth congressional district (1981–present)

Local officials

- Muriel Bowser, mayor of Washington, D.C. (2015–present)

Labor unions

- Amalgamated Transit Union Local 689
- American Federation of State, County and Municipal Employees Council 67
- American Federation of Teachers Maryland
- Maryland State and District of Columbia AFL–CIO
- Service Employees International Union Local 500

Organizations

- CASA in Action

Newspapers

- The Washington Post

==== Fundraising ====
Primary campaign finance activity through July 3, 2022
Candidate	Raised	Spent	Cash on hand
Angela Alsobrooks	$932,784	$1,505,837	$449,365
Leigh Bodden	$10,167	$7,122	$3,045
Billy Bridges	<$1,000	<$1,000	N/A
Sherman Hardy	$3,667	$2,965	$702
Moisette Sweat	$21,443	$22,316	$307
Source: Maryland State Board of Elections

==== Results ====
Democratic primary results
Party	Candidate	Votes	%
Democratic	Angela Alsobrooks (incumbent)	115,473	90.9
Democratic	Moisette Tonya Sweat	3,979	3.1
Democratic	Leigh Bodden	2,865	2.3
Democratic	Sherman R. Hardy	2,767	2.2
Democratic	Billy W. Bridges	1,909	1.5
Total votes		126,993	100.0

=== Independent and third-party candidates ===
==== Failed to qualify ====
- Joe Njuguna (independent), Marine Corps veteran

==== Fundraising ====
Primary campaign finance activity through July 3, 2022
Candidate	Raised	Spent	Cash on hand
Joe Njuguna	$7,575	$5,330	$2,245
Source: Maryland State Board of Elections

=== General election ===
==== Post-primary endorsements ====
Angela Alsobrooks (D)

Labor unions

- International Brotherhood of Electrical Workers Local 26

Organizations

- Planned Parenthood Action Fund

Newspapers

- Baltimore Afro-American

==== Fundraising ====
Primary campaign finance activity through November 15, 2022
Candidate	Raised	Spent	Cash on hand
Angela Alsobrooks	$1,005,305	$1,776,475	$251,249
Source: Maryland State Board of Elections

==== Results ====
Prince George's County Executive election, 2022
Party	Candidate	Votes	%	±%
Democratic	Angela Alsobrooks (incumbent)	219,453	98.65%	−0.29
Write-in		3,000	1.35%	+0.29
Total votes		222,453	100.00%	
Democratic hold				

== Wicomico County ==
2022 Wicomico County executive election
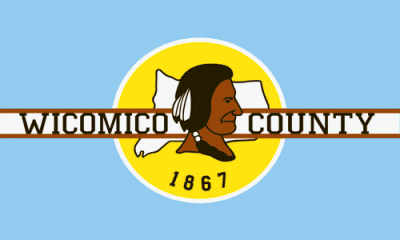

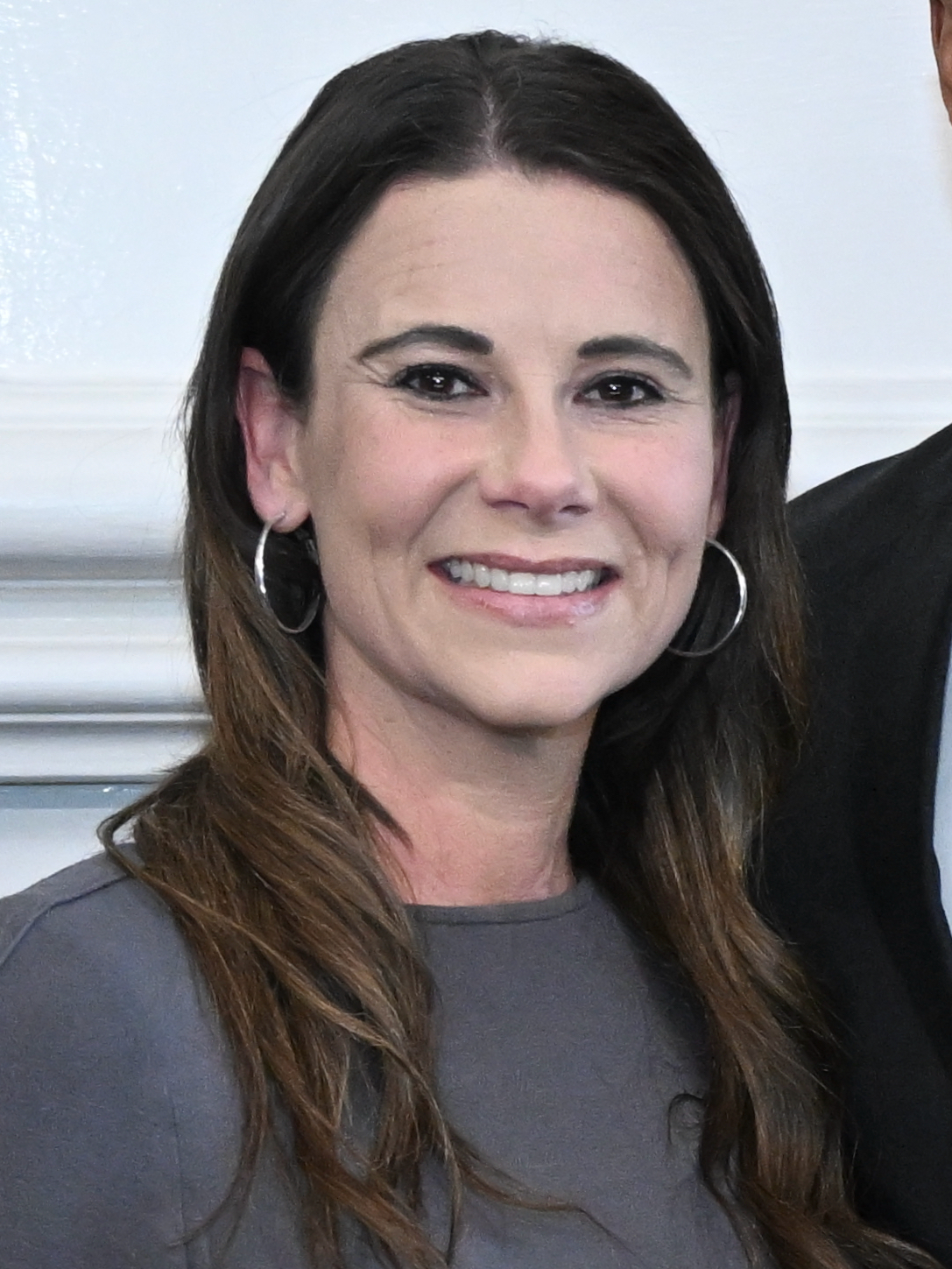

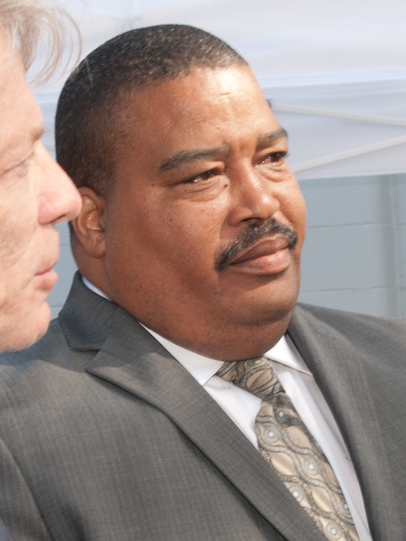

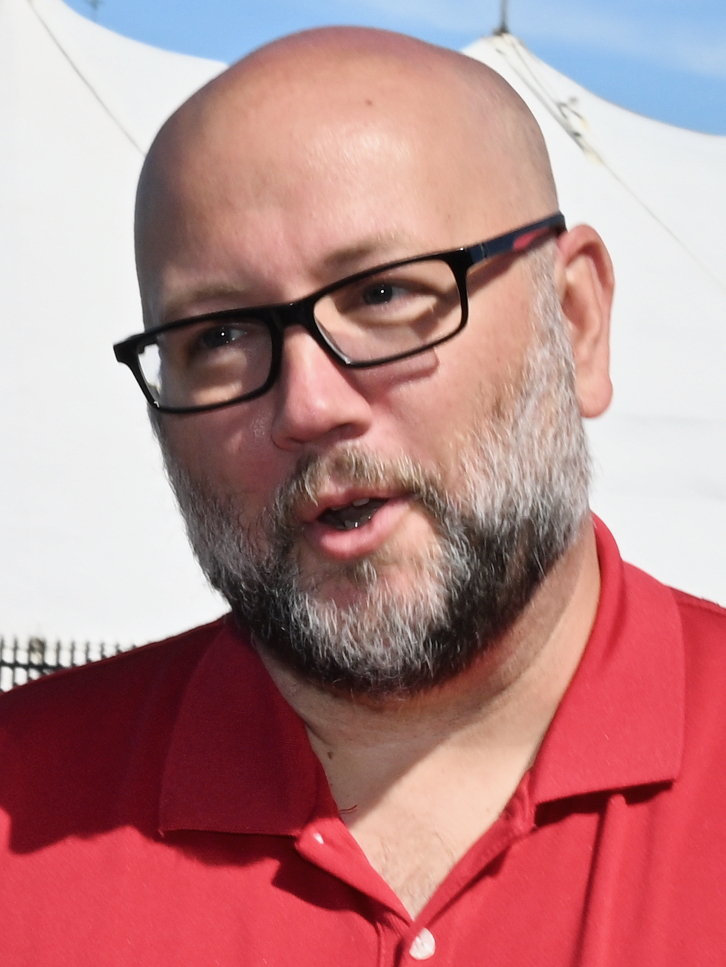
Nominee	Julie Giordano	Ernest Davis	Muir Boda
Party	Republican	Democratic	Libertarian
Popular vote	15,509	13,060	1,702
Percentage	51.15%	43.07%	5.61%
- Precinct results Giordano: 40–50% 50–60% 60–70% 70–80% Davis: 40–50% 50–60% 60–70% 70–80% 80–90% >90%
County Executive before election
John Psota
Republican
Elected County Executive
Julie Giordano
Republican

Acting county executive John Psota was seeking his first full term. He was appointed to fill the seat of former County Executive Robert L. Culver Jr, who died of cancer on July 26, 2020.

=== Republican primary ===
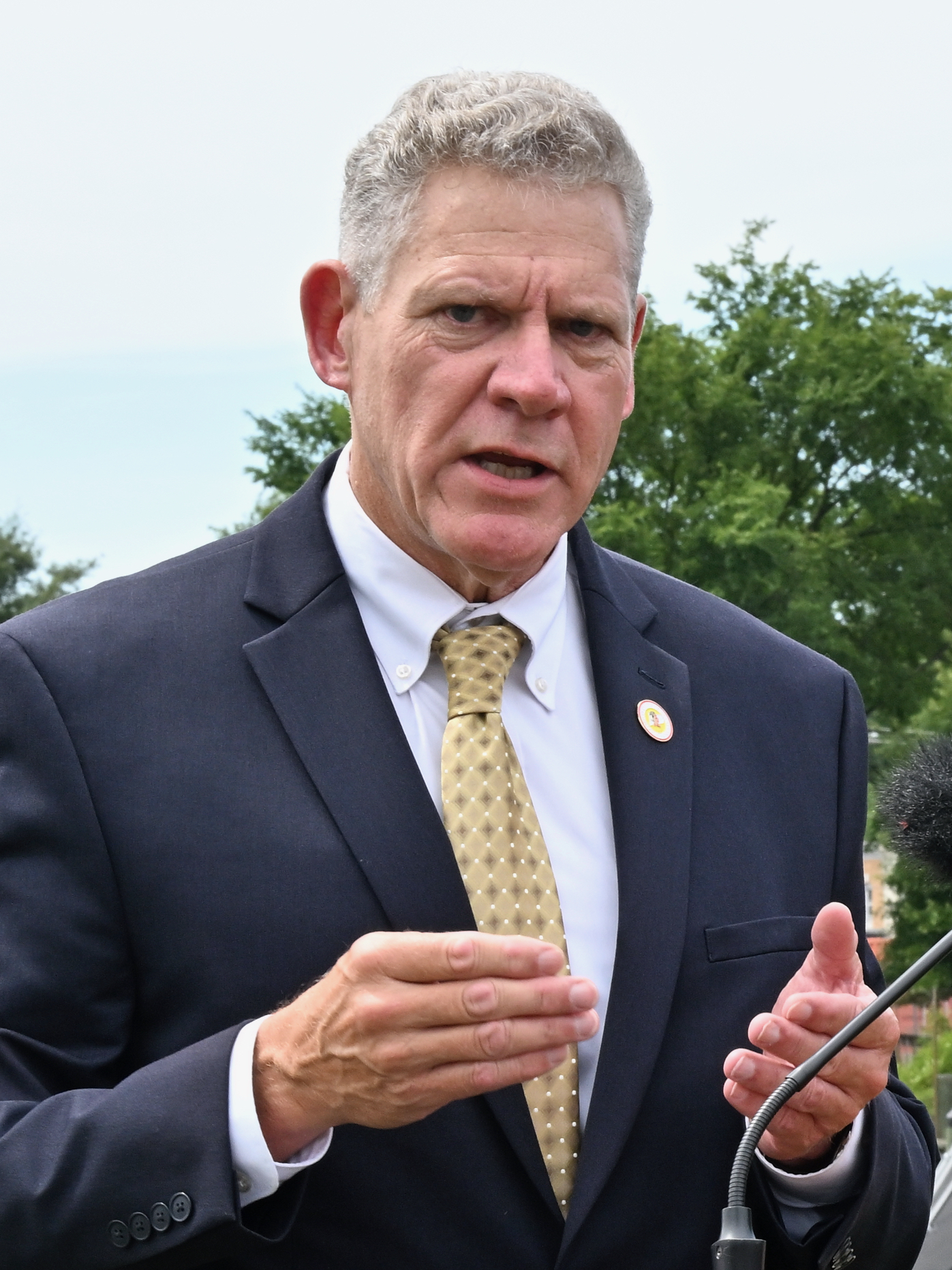
County executive John Psota was defeated by teacher Julie Giordano in the primary.

==== Nominee ====
- Julie Giordano, middle/high school teacher and member of the Wicomico County Republican Central Committee

==== Eliminated in primary ====
- John Psota, incumbent county executive

==== Endorsements ====
Julie Giordano

Organizations

- Maryland Right to Life

==== Fundraising ====
Primary campaign finance activity through July 3, 2022
Candidate	Raised	Spent	Cash on hand
Julie Giordano	$32,030	$26,134	$5,896
John Psota	$34,960	$15,986	$18,974
Source: Maryland State Board of Elections

==== Results ====
Republican primary results
Party	Candidate	Votes	%
Republican	Julie Giordano	3,774	51.9
Republican	John Psota (incumbent)	3,495	48.1
Total votes		7,269	100.0

=== Democratic primary ===
==== Nominee ====
- Ernest Davis, vice president of the Wicomico County Council (2021–present)

==== Fundraising ====
Primary campaign finance activity through July 3, 2022
Candidate	Raised	Spent	Cash on hand
Ernest Davis	$10,479	$3,872	$7,143
Source: Maryland State Board of Elections

==== Results ====
Democratic primary results
Party	Candidate	Votes	%
Democratic	Ernest Davis	5,132	100.0
Total votes		5,132	100.0

=== Independent and third-party candidates ===
==== Declared ====
- Muir Boda (Libertarian), vice president of the Salisbury City Council

==== Fundraising ====
Primary campaign finance activity through July 3, 2022
Candidate	Raised	Spent	Cash on hand
Muir Boda	$293	$61	$419
Source: Maryland State Board of Elections

=== General election ===
==== Post-primary endorsements ====
Julie Giordano (R)

Local officials

- Dan Cox, state delegate for the 4th district (2019–present), nominee for Maryland's 8th congressional district in 2016, and nominee for governor in 2022
Muir Boda (L)

Local officials

- Rick Pollitt, former Wicomico County executive (2006–2014) and manager of Snow Hill, Maryland (2021–present) (Democratic)

==== Fundraising ====
Primary campaign finance activity through November 15, 2022
Candidate	Raised	Spent	Cash on hand
Julie Giordano	$103,005	$98,626	$4,379
Ernest Davis	$43,533	$39,825	$4,244
Muir Boda	$4,140	$4,250	$78
Source: Maryland State Board of Elections

==== Results ====
Wicomico County Executive election, 2022
Party	Candidate	Votes	%	±%
Republican	Julie Giordano	15,509	51.15%	+2.48
Democratic	Ernest Davis	13,060	43.07%	+12.72
Libertarian	Muir Boda	1,702	5.61%	N/A
Write-in		52	0.17%	+0.13
Total votes		30,323	100.00%	
Republican hold				

== Notes ==
Partisan clients

== See also ==
- United States elections, 2022
