= Jerry Donald =

American politician (born 1964)

- Donald in 2023

Member-elect of the Maryland House of Delegates from the 4th district
- Assuming office January 13, 2027
- Succeeding: Barrie Ciliberti

Member of the Frederick County Council from the 1st district
- Incumbent
- Assumed office December 1, 2014
- Preceded by: District established

Personal details
- Born: Jerry D. Donald; September 1964 (age 62) Frederick, Maryland, U.S.
- Party: Democratic
- Spouse: Beverly
- Children: 3
- Education: McDaniel College (BA)

Jerry D. Donald (born September 1964) is an American politician and former teacher who is a member-elect of the Maryland House of Delegates from the 4th district. A member of the Democratic Party, he was a member of the Frederick County Council from 2014 to 2026.

== Early life and education ==
Donald was born in September 1964 in Frederick, Maryland. His mother, Ruth, was a retired nurse who worked at Frederick Memorial Hospital, while his father, Carl, was the principal of Middletown and Brunswick middle schools. Donald grew up in Braddock Heights, Maryland, and graduated from Middletown High School, afterwards attending Western Maryland College (now McDaniel College), where he earned a Bachelor of Arts degree.

== Career ==
Donald worked as a driver and caseworker for U.S. representative Beverly Byron for two years. Afterwards, he worked as a teacher for 34 years, first with Washington County Public Schools and then with Frederick County Public Schools, where he taught at Heather Ridge School, Linganore High School, and Middletown High School. He was also a football coach at South Hagerstown High School, a baseball coach at Linganore, and advisor for various student clubs. Donald retired from teaching in summer 2023.

Donald is a member of the Braddock Heights Community Association and previously served as its president.

=== Frederick County Council ===
Donald (right) with Lieutenant Governor Boyd Rutherford (left) and state delegate Kathy Afzali (center) at the Brunswick Veterans Day Parade, 2017

Donald ran to represent the 1st district of the Frederick County Council in 2014. He won the Democratic primary on June 24, 2014, defeating challenger Rich Maranto with 57.7% of the vote. He defeated Republican nominee Ellen Bartlett, the wife of former U.S. representative Roscoe Bartlett, in the general election with 50.0% of the vote, edging out Bartlett by 25 votes. Donald was sworn in on December 1, 2014.

In January 2015, the Frederick County Ethics Commission issued an advisory opinion that Donald and Jessica Fitzwater, who both worked as teachers while serving on the Frederick County Council, could vote on the county budget without violating the county's ethics rules. In May 2015, after the Frederick County Ethics Commission ruled that county councilmember Kirby Delauter—who owned W.F. Delauter & Son, a construction company that does utility and road work in Frederick County—could submit bids for county capital projects while serving as a county councilmember, county executive Jan Gardner issued an executive order prohibiting the county from awarding capital projects to companies owned by elected officials, which she said would have created a conflict of interest. Following this, Delauter called on Donald and Fitzwater to abstain from voting on the budget because of their work as schoolteachers, saying that now that his work was seen as a conflict, so was theirs. Donald refused, saying that his ability to vote on the budge was clearly allowed by state law.

Donald ran for re-election to a second term in 2018. He was unopposed in the Democratic primary and defeated Republican nominee Kevin Grubb in the general election with 50.7% of the vote.

In February 2021, Donald expressed interest in running for Frederick County Executive in 2022, but said if "I were to decide to do that, it would end what I do with being a teacher". He filed to run for re-election to a third term in January 2022, defeating Republican nominee John Distel in the general election with 52.6% of the vote.

=== Maryland House of Delegates ===
Donald was term-limited from running for a fourth term on the Frederick County Council in 2026. On September 19, 2025, he announced that he would run to represent the 4th district in the Maryland House of Delegates. During his campaign, he supported increasing funding for school construction, upgrades to the Middletown Wastewater Treatment Plant, and transportation improvements. Donald won the Democratic primary on June 23, 2026, placing second behind Andrew Duck with 27.5% of the vote, and defeated Republicans April Fleming Miller and Jason Keckler in the general election.

Donald will be sworn in on January 13, 2027. He will be a member of the Environment and Transportation Committee.

== Political positions ==
=== Agriculture ===
In August 2024, Donald introduced bills aimed at limiting agritourism in Frederick County by enumerating the conditions under which agricultural buildings can be open to the public and limiting the kinds of activities allowed as part of agritourism enterprises. The agritourism restrictions were rejected by the county council by a 4–3 vote in November 2024.

=== Economic issues ===
During his 2014 county council campaign, Donald supported investments in the county's biotechnology industries, calling it the "future of this county". He also opposed lowering taxes in Frederick County, which he said could jeopardize local services and the quality of the county's education system. During his tenure, Donald supported budgets proposed by county executives Jan Gardner and Jessica Fitzwater.

Donald has described himself as "not a big person on tax credits" with exception to senior citizens. In February 2018, Donald introduced a bill to expand eligibility for a property tax credit for senior citizens. In April 2018, Donald and Delauter jointly introduced a compromise bill to expand the county's senior property tax credit.

In February 2018, Donald signed onto a letter supporting Comptroller Peter Franchot's "Reform on Tap" proposals, which would deregulate the state's brewing industry.

In February 2020, Donald introduced a bill on behalf of Gardner to impose a one-time tax to provide funding for agricultural land preservation. The county council voted 6–1 to pass the bill in March 2020.

In May 2024, Donald voted against a 4.7% property tax increase, saying that he did not believe the county would be able to undertake major school construction projects without the backing of the Moore administration.

=== Education ===
During his 2014 county council campaign, Donald supported ending the county's decision to only fund schools at the maintenance of effort level. In May 2023, Donald voted against an amendment to county executive Jessica Fitzwater's budget that would have reallocated $3.5 million in surplus funds to Frederick County Public Schools, saying that he could not support a budget increase he viewed as unsustainable.

During his 2026 House of Delegates campaign, Donald supported the Blueprint for Maryland's Future but believed the state needed to review the Blueprint to see what is feasible and what is not, in particular mandates for policies and costs it passes onto local governments.

=== Energy ===
During his 2014 county council campaign, Donald criticized waste-to-energy as not being financially viable, and said the county should reconsider using it after Carroll County paid $1 million to get out of its waste-to-energy deal.

In May 2017, Donald voted for a bill that would allow solar arrays of up to 75 acres on certain parts of agricultural land in the county.

In June 2023, Donald expressed concerns with a proposed Amazon data center in Frederick County, citing the water and electricity required for the data center operation. In November 2024, he encouraged county officials to make data center design requirements "as strong as possible" while they still had the ability to control what the industry looks like in Frederick County. He later introduced a bill that sets data center design and location requirements, creating a floating zone where data centers could be located if developers met design requirements, including water and electricity usage. Donald voted against bills changing the approval criteria for data centers and creating a special zoning mechanism for data centers. In May 2026, Donald participated in and spoke at a protest against a state air quality permit for a new Amazon data center near Adamstown.

In August 2024, he expressed concerns with the Maryland Piedmont Reliability Project (MPRP), saying that while he understood the need for more electricity in the area, he was concerned with the lack of transparency around a project that "doesn't seem to be an emergency".

=== Environment ===
In October 2015, Donald introduced a bill to establish stricter prohibitions for what is not allowed in buffer strips. The bill was passed by the Frederick County Council in a 5–2 vote in December 2015.

In June 2019, Donald supported a proposed single-use plastic ban in Frederick.

In July 2020, Donald voted for a resolution declaring climate change an emergency issue and forming a workgroup to combat that issue in Frederick County.

=== Gun policy ===
In March 2015, Donald opposed a bill that would allow farmers south of Interstate 70 to use rifles to defend their fields from deer, citing safety concerns voiced by residents during the hearing on the bill. After the Maryland General Assembly passed this bill during the 2015 legislative session, Donald sought to change the regulations so that rifle-hunting privileges were only extended to people with deer management permits. After a Frederick County Delegation meeting on the issue in March 2016, state lawmakers said they would only entertain the request to change the regulation if several groups could agree on a solution.

In August 2019, following a mass shooting in Dayton, Ohio that killed nine people and injured 27, Donald called for action to end gun violence across the nation and especially in schools.

=== Housing and development ===
During his 2014 county council campaign, Donald supported returning Frederick County to a strong Adequate Public Facilities Ordinance and making sure growth in Frederick County only occurred in areas where the infrastructure could handle it. During his 2018 campaign, he supported containing urban sprawl in Frederick County and concentrating development to areas where growth and infrastructure already exist.

In July 2016, Donald introduced a bill that would add additional notice requirements for the county and property owners when a piece of land is up for rezoning consideration.

In August 2016, Donald voted for a bill allowing the city of Frederick and Frederick County to enter into payment in lieu of taxes programs for housing projects and have affordable housing developers pay a set rate instead of the tax rate determined by the property's full value. He also voted for a bill to increase the county's hotel tax, which would be used to provide increased tourism funding to the county's municipalities.

In October 2018, Donald voted against a bill adjusting the county's school construction fees based on data from the state's School Construction Cost Index. In March 2019, he and county councilmember Steve McKay introduced legislation that would require developers to pay additional fees if they do not meet the county's Adequate Public Facilities Ordinance. The impact fees bill passed by a 6–0 vote in April 2019. In March 2021, Donald and McKay introduced a bill to increase impact fees on developers looking to build single-family detached homes in areas where schools are over their state-rated capacity. The bill passed the county council by a 6–1 vote in May 2021.

In March 2019, Donald supported a bill to limit Development Rights and Responsibilities Agreements to residential developments of 1,500 or more dwelling units, require enhanced public benefits, and limit them to a five-year term. He voted against the bill in May 2019, after an amendment increased the term length from five to eight years.

In September 2020, Donald introduced a bill that would prevent developers from paying impact fees already paid on parcels of land, even after a land transfer occurs or permits expire, and would give developers credit if they donated land for the site of a county school. The bill passed, but was vetoed by county executive Jan Gardner. The county council failed to override Gardner's veto in October 2020, with Donald voting against it after county councilmember Phil Dacey amended the bill to increase he maximum size of an accessory dwelling unit exempt from public school impact fee waivers.

In September 2023, Donald introduced a bill that would allow day care centers and nursery schools to operate in areas zoned for office, research, and industrial use. The bill unanimously passed the county council in October 2023.

In October 2024, Donald supported a bill that would've created criteria for implementing a temporary residential growth moratorium tied to school capacity, calling it a "reasonable approach" to the issue of school overcrowding. The moratorium was rejected by the county council in a 5–1 vote.

=== Policing ===
In February 2021, Donald supported Middletown High School's use of school resource officers, calling it "community policing at its best". At the same time, he said school resource officers were not the only solution to deal with crisis situations at schools or students dealing with mental health issues.

During his 2026 House of Delegates campaign, Donald supported banning 287(g) program agreements between Maryland counties and U.S. Immigration and Customs Enforcement, saying that ICE has "poisoned the well for anything associated with it, so I am fine with banning it at this point". At the same time, he said that he didn't think 287(g) "was a bad program if run professionally", noting that he never heard complaints about it during the Obama or Biden administrations.

=== Social issues ===
In April 2015, Donald opposed giving historical designation status to the Trout Run retreat, saying that President Herbert Hoover's visits to the retreat did not justify the historic designation.

In August 2015, Donald voted to repeal a 2012 ordinance that required Frederick County to only operate in the English language, calling it "government overreach".

=== Transportation ===
During his 2014 county council campaign, Donald supported adding shoulders to many of Frederick County's connector roads, citing pedestrian and vehicle safety. In April 2017, he supported the widening of Interstate 70 and U.S. Route 340.

== Personal life ==
Donald is married to his wife, Beverly. Together, they have three children and live in Braddock Heights, Maryland. Donald attends services at the Trinity United Methodist Church in Frederick, Maryland.

== Electoral history ==
2014 Frederick County Council District 1 election
Primary election
Party	Candidate	Votes	%
Democratic	Jerry Donald	1,399	57.7
Democratic	Richard A. Maranto	1,027	42.3
Total votes		2,426	100.0
General election
Democratic	Jerry Donald	8,234	50.0
Republican	Ellen L. Bartlett	8,209	49.8
Write-in		31	0.2
Total votes		16,474	100.0

2018 Frederick County Council District 1 election
Primary election
Party	Candidate	Votes	%
Democratic	Jerry Donald (incumbent)	3,078	100.0
Total votes		3,078	100.0
General election
Democratic	Jerry Donald (incumbent)	11,681	50.7
Republican	Kevin Grubb	11,336	49.2
Write-in		24	0.1
Total votes		23,041	100.0

2022 Frederick County Council District 1 election
Primary election
Party	Candidate	Votes	%
Democratic	Jerry Donald (incumbent)	4,303	100.0
Total votes		4,303	100.0
General election
Democratic	Jerry Donald (incumbent)	12,704	52.6
Republican	John A. Distel	11,438	47.4
Write-in		8	0.0
Total votes		24,150	100.0
