= Maryland Legislative District 4 =

American legislative district

Maryland's legislative district 4
- Represents part of Frederick County
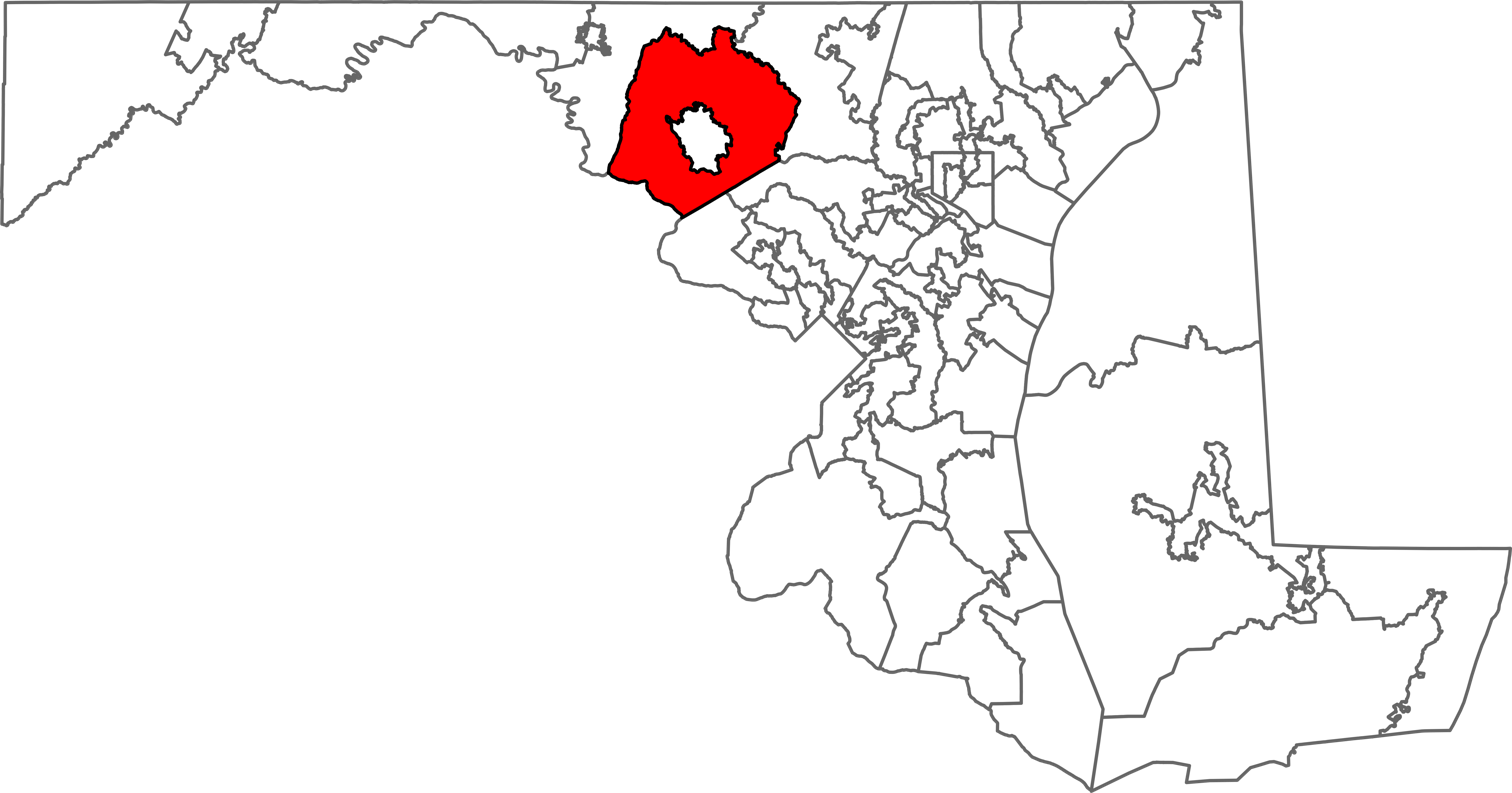
- Senator: William Folden (R)
- Delegate(s): Barrie S. Ciliberti (R); April Fleming Miller (R); Jesse T. Pippy (R)
- Registration: 45.2% Republican; 30.9% Democratic; 22.8% unaffiliated
- Demographics: 82.1% White; 4.1% Black/African American; 0.3% Native American; 3.7% Asian; 0.1% Hawaiian/Pacific Islander; 2.3% Other race; 7.6% Two or more races; 6.5% Hispanic
- Population (2020): 141,284
- Voting-age population: 107,625
- Registered voters: 102,375

Maryland Legislative District 4 is one of 47 districts in the state for the Maryland General Assembly. It covers part of Frederick County. Three delegates represent the district in the Maryland House of Delegates.

== History ==
The constituency of District 4 was parts of Frederick County and Carroll County up until the 2020 United States redistricting cycle when its constituency changed to part of Frederick County.

== Demographic characteristics ==
As of the 2020 United States census, the district had a population of 141,284, of whom 107,625 (76.2%) were of voting age. The racial makeup of the district was 115,959 (82.1%) White, 5,755 (4.1%) African American, 389 (0.3%) Native American, 5,177 (3.7%) Asian, 85 (0.1%) Pacific Islander, 3,197 (2.3%) from some other race, and 10,736 (7.6%) from two or more races. Hispanic or Latino of any race were 9,166 (6.5%) of the population.

The district had 102,375 registered voters as of October 17, 2020, of whom 23,301 (22.8%) were registered as unaffiliated, 46,243 (45.2%) were registered as Republicans, 31,657 (30.9%) were registered as Democrats, and 455 (0.4%) were registered to other parties.

== Political representation ==
The district is represented for the 2023–2027 legislative term in the State Senate by William Folden (R) and in the House of Delegates by Barrie S. Ciliberti (R), April Fleming Miller (R), and Jesse T. Pippy (R). For the 2027-2031 term, is represented in the State Senate by Lara Westdorp (D) and in the House of Delegates by Jesse Pippy (R), Jerry Donald (D), and Andrew Duck (D).

== Election history ==
=== Multi-member Senate district (1967–1975) ===
Year	District 4-A	District 4-B		District 4-C	
1967	Edward T. Conroy	Meyer M. Emanuel Jr.	Royal Hart	Fred L. Wineland	Steny Hoyer
1968	Edward T. Conroy	Meyer M. Emanuel Jr.	Royal Hart	Fred L. Wineland	Steny Hoyer
1969	Edward T. Conroy	Meyer M. Emanuel Jr.	Royal Hart	Fred L. Wineland	Steny Hoyer
1970	Edward T. Conroy	Meyer M. Emanuel Jr.	Royal Hart	Fred L. Wineland	Steny Hoyer
1971	Edward T. Conroy	Meyer M. Emanuel Jr.	William J. Goodman	Peter A. Bozick	Steny Hoyer
1972	Edward T. Conroy	Meyer M. Emanuel Jr.	William J. Goodman	Peter A. Bozick	Steny Hoyer
1973	Edward T. Conroy	Meyer M. Emanuel Jr.	William J. Goodman	Peter A. Bozick	Steny Hoyer
1974	Edward T. Conroy	Meyer M. Emanuel Jr.	William J. Goodman	Peter A. Bozick	Steny Hoyer

=== Single-member Senate district (1975–present) ===
Years	Senator	Party	Electoral history
January 18, 1967 – January 11, 1995	Charles H. Smelser	Democratic	Redistricted from the 2nd district and re-elected in 1974. Re-elected in 1978. Re-elected in 1982. Re-elected in 1986. Re-elected in 1990. Retired.
January 11, 1995 – January 8, 2003	Timothy R. Ferguson	Republican	Elected in 1994. Re-elected in 1998. Lost renomination.
January 8, 2003 – January 15, 2015	David R. Brinkley	Republican	Elected in 2002. Re-elected in 2006. Re-elected in 2010. Lost renomination.
January 15, 2015 – January 11, 2023	Michael Hough	Republican	Elected in 2014. Re-elected in 2018. Retired to run for Frederick County Executive.
January 11, 2023 – January 13, 2027	William Folden	Republican	Elected in 2022. Lost re-election.
January 13, 2027 – present	Lara Westdorp	Democratic	Elected in 2026.
