= Revolutionary Workers Party =

There are several groups named Revolutionary Workers Party:

- Revolutionary Workers' Party (Bolivia)
- Revolutionary Workers Party (Canada)
- Revolutionary Workers Party (Chile)
- Revolutionary Workers Party (India)
- Revolutionary Workers' Party (Peru)
- Revolutionary Workers' Party (Philippines)
- Revolutionary Workers' Party (Russia)
- Revolutionary Workers' Party (Spain)
- Revolutionary Workers Party (Sri Lanka)
- Revolutionary Workers' Party (Turkey)
- Revolutionary Workers' Party (Trotskyist), UK
- Revolutionary Workers, a political party founded by American politician Kshama Sawant

== See also ==
- Workers' Revolutionary Party (disambiguation)
