= Revolutionary Party =

Revolutionary Party is the name of several political parties, including:

== Active parties ==
Nation	Party
Armenia	Armenian Revolutionary Federation
Dominican Republic	Dominican Revolutionary Party
Guatemala	Guatemalan National Revolutionary Unity
Haiti	Haitian National Revolutionary Party
India	Democratic Revolutionary Peoples Party; Uttarakhand Kranti Dal
Laos	Lao People's Revolutionary Party
Mexico	Institutional Revolutionary Party
Mongolia	Mongolian People's Revolutionary Party
Panama	Democratic Revolutionary Party
Paraguay	Revolutionary Febrerista Party
Peru	American Popular Revolutionary Alliance
Tanzania	Chama Cha Mapinduzi

== Former parties ==
Nation	Party
East Turkestan	East Turkestan Revolutionary Party
Guatemala	Revolutionary Party
India	Bharatiya Kranti Dal
Korea	Korea National Revolutionary Party; Korea Revolutionary Party (1926); Korea Revolutionary Party (1937)
Mozambique	Revolutionary Party of Mozambique
Russia	Socialist Revolutionary Party

== See also ==
- People's Revolutionary Party
- Revolutionary Communist Party
- Revolutionary Socialist Party
- Workers Revolutionary Party
