= Mongolian People's Revolutionary Party =

Mongolian People's Revolutionary Party may refer to:

- Mongolian People's Party, which reverted to its original pre-1924 name ("Mongolian People's Party", without the word "Revolutionary") in 2010
- Mongolian People's Revolutionary Party (2010), whose members split from the original party after the name change
