= Maryland Piedmont Reliability Project =

Proposed power line in Maryland, U.S.

- Map of the proposed power line

Location
- Country: United States
- State: Maryland

Ownership information
- Operator: PJM Interconnection

Construction information
- Contractors: Public Service Enterprise Group

Technical information
- Type: High-voltage local transmission line
- Total length: 70 mi (110 km)
- DC voltage: 500 kV (500,000 V)

The Maryland Piedmont Reliability Project (MPRP) is a proposed 70 miles (110 km)-long electrical transmission line project in the counties of Baltimore, Carroll, and Frederick in the U.S. state of Maryland.

== Project overview ==
The MPRP is an effort by PJM Interconnection to address climbing power demands amid the AI boom and the subsequent growth of data centers. The power line would primarily support companies in the Dulles Technology Corridor in Virginia and data centers in Maryland. PJM awarded the $424 million contract to build a new power line connecting the Doubs substation near Frederick to the Conastone substation in Harford County to the Public Service Enterprise Group (PSEG) in December 2023. According to PSEG, the project could lower utility rates for Maryland residents and would prevent existing power lines in the state from being overburdened and causing brownouts as soon as 2027.

Maryland law requires that 50 percent of all power come from renewable sources by 2030; as a result, a number of coal-fired and natural gas power plants in the state have been retired with few new projects to substitute them, despite growing energy demands in the state. As of 2024, Maryland imports 40% of the electricity it uses. During the 2024 legislative session, the Maryland General Assembly approved legislation that would make it easier to establish data centers in Maryland by changing the way the Maryland Public Service Commission counts back-up generators.

The MPRP is currently pending approval from the Maryland Public Service Commission, which isn't expected to decide on the project until at least February 2027. The PSEG urged Maryland regulators to reevaluate this timeline in October 2025, saying that the company hoped to bring the MPRP power line online by June 2027.

== Route ==
The MPRP's route was finalized in October 2024. Going from east to west, the transmission line begins just north of Maryland Route 439 in northern Baltimore County. It then follows a westward path through Carroll and Frederick counties, crossing Interstate 83 west of Westminster, Route 26, Interstate 70 east of Frederick, and Interstate 270 south of Frederick before terminating. The power line would cut through multiple farms and affect more than 350 parcels.

== Opposition ==
By early July 2024, local farmers, homeowners, and environmental advocates began organizing against the project through Facebook groups such as Stop MPRP, which grew to over 10,000 members in January 2025. Several property owners also warned that their land could be taken from them using eminent domain; according to PSEG's website, invoking eminent domain to secure land for the power line would be an "option of last resort" following good faith efforts to negotiate with property owners. During a March 2025 WBFF town hall, Maryland governor Wes Moore said that he does "not believe in eminent domain" on a wide scale as the current MPRP proposal would demand.

Republican state lawmakers began organizing hearings with PSEG executives as word began to spread, where they attempted to answered questions residents had about the proposed power line. County officials in Baltimore, Carroll, and Frederick counties have also passed resolutions opposing the project. In September 2024, a bipartisan group of Baltimore County lawmakers wrote a letter to PJM Interconnection to demand more transparency about its plans for the MPRP power line. In November 2024, Democratic Governor Wes Moore expressed "grave concerns" with the MPRP power line project, organizing a meeting with PSEG and PJM executives to discuss "serious reservations about how this project has been conducted thus far, and the type of engagement I expect with our communities". As of November 2025, Moore has not acted to stop the power line.

In November 2024, the Chesapeake Bay Foundation released a study finding that the MPRP's proposed route would run through 514 acres of protected land, including vulnerable forests, high-quality watersheds, and a portion of Gunpowder Falls State Park. In March 2025, the Maryland Office of People's Counsel released a report finding that the state would not need any new generation or additional transmission to meet its electric demand through 2042.

In April 2025, amid resistance from landowners, PSEG sought court permission to temporarily access 90 properties for survey work related to the MPRP. U.S. District Court Judge ruled in PSEG's favor in June 2025, saying the company showed its project would be delayed significantly at substantial cost if it was denied access for surveying. In August 2025, PSEG requested protection from the United States Marshals Service after its surveying crews allegedly faced multiple threats while attempting to access private land, including one instance in which a survey team was threatened with gun violence and another where survey team members were almost hit with an all-terrain vehicle. The request for U.S. Marshal protection was rejected in September 2025, after respondents said that they would comply with all court orders and cooperate with PSEG's access to their properties. In October 2025, PSEG sought court permission to prohibit hunting on private properties on days it may be completing field surveys, which was granted in November 2025. In March and April 2026, U.S. District judge Adam B. Abelson ordered for U.S. marshals to accompany PSEG agents while they performed surveying work on properties owned by certain property owners who had allegedly made violent threats toward surveyors.
