= 2018 Maryland county executive elections =

- November 6, 2018

8 of Maryland's 9 county executive seats
	Majority party	Minority party
Party	Democratic	Republican
Last election	4	5
Seats won	6	3
Seat change	▲2	▼2
Popular vote	1,036,504	512,409
Percentage	63.14%	31.21%
Democratic
50–60%
60–70%
>90%
Republican
40–50%
60-70%

The Maryland county executive elections of 2018 took place on November 6, 2018, with the primary election occurring on June 26, 2018.

Anne Arundel County, Baltimore County, Frederick County, Harford County, Howard County, Montgomery County, Prince George's County, and Wicomico County elected county executives.

== Race summary ==
County	County executive	Party	First elected	Last race	Status	Candidates
Anne Arundel County	Steve Schuh	Republican	2014	61.1% R	Incumbent lost re-election. Democratic gain.	▌Steuart Pittman (Democratic) 52.3%; ▌Steve Schuh (Republican) 47.6%
Baltimore County	Don Mohler	Democratic	2018 (appointed)	56.1% D	Incumbent retired. Democratic hold.	▌Johnny Olszewski (Democratic) 57.8%; ▌Al Redmer (Republican) 42.0%
Frederick County	Jan Gardner	Democratic	2014	53.8% D	Incumbent re-elected.	▌Jan Gardner (Democratic) 52.1%; ▌Kathy Afzali (Republican) 43.1%
Harford County	Barry Glassman	Republican	2014	74.8% R	Incumbent re-elected.	▌Barry Glassman (Republican) 67.4%; ▌Maryann Connaghan Forgan (Democratic) 32.4%
Howard County	Allan Kittleman	Republican	2014	51.2% R	Incumbent lost re-election. Democratic gain.	▌Calvin Ball III (Democratic) 52.8%; ▌Allan Kittleman (Republican) 47.1%
Montgomery County	Ike Leggett	Democratic	2006	65.3% D	Incumbent term-limited. Democratic hold.	▌Marc Elrich (Democratic) 64.7%; ▌Nancy Floreen (Independent) 19.0%; ▌Robin Ficker (Republican) 16.2%
Prince George's County	Rushern Baker	Democratic	2010	98.8% D	Incumbent term-limited. Democratic hold.	▌Angela Alsobrooks (Democratic) 98.9%
Wicomico County	Bob Culver	Republican	2014	55.5% R	Incumbent re-elected.	▌Bob Culver (Republican) 48.7%; ▌John Hamilton (Democratic) 30.4%; ▌Jack Heath (Independent) 20.9%

== Anne Arundel County ==
2018 Anne Arundel County executive election

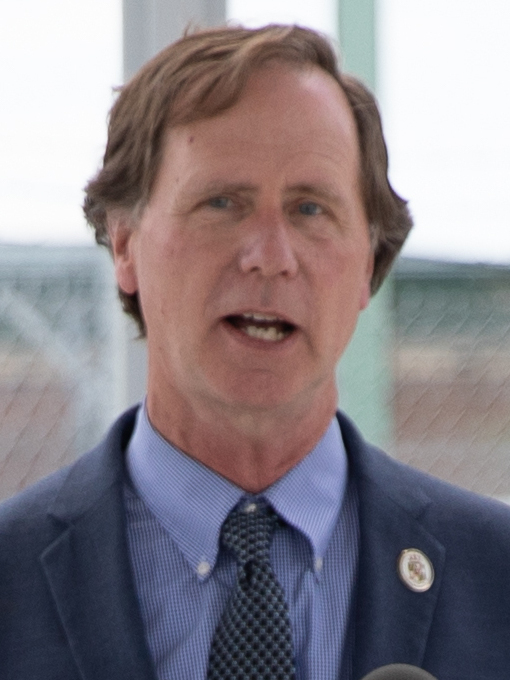

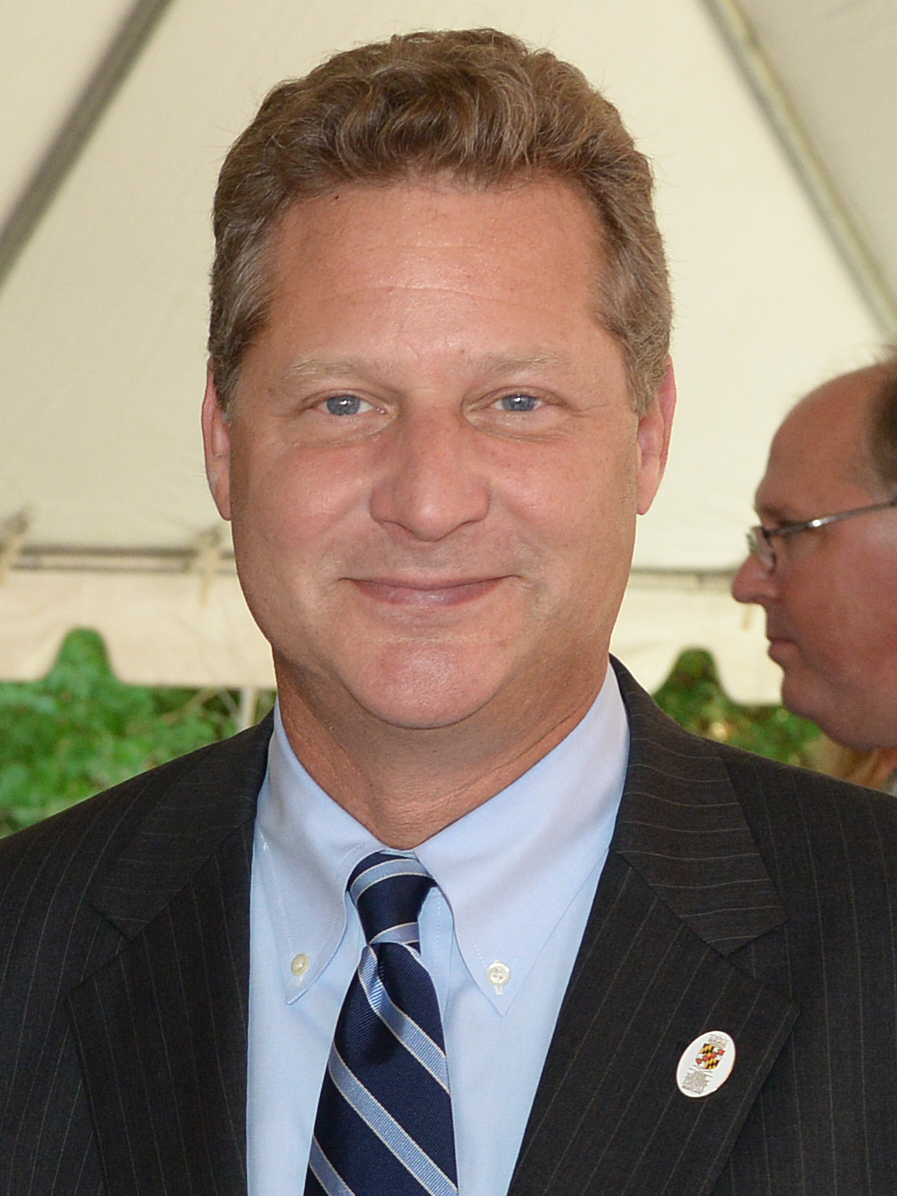
Nominee	Steuart Pittman	Steve Schuh
Party	Democratic	Republican
Popular vote	118,572	107,905
Percentage	52.3%	47.6%
- Pittman: 50–60% 60–70% 70–80% 80–90% Schuh: 50–60% 60–70% 70–80%
County Executive before election
Steve Schuh
Republican
Elected County Executive
Steuart Pittman
Democratic

The incumbent county executive was Republican Steve Schuh, who was elected in 2014 with 61.1 percent of the vote. He was eligible for re-election and unsuccessfully sought a second term.

=== Republican primary ===
==== Nominee ====
- Steve Schuh, incumbent county executive

=== Democratic primary ===
==== Nominee ====
- Steuart Pittman, president of the Maryland Horse Council and owner of Dodon Farm

=== General election ===
==== Results ====
Anne Arundel County Executive election, 2018
Party	Candidate	Votes	%
Democratic	Steuart Pittman	118,572	52.3
Republican	Steve Schuh (incumbent)	107,905	47.6
Write-in		259	0.1
Total votes		226,736	100.0
Democratic gain from Republican			

== Baltimore County ==
2018 Baltimore County executive election

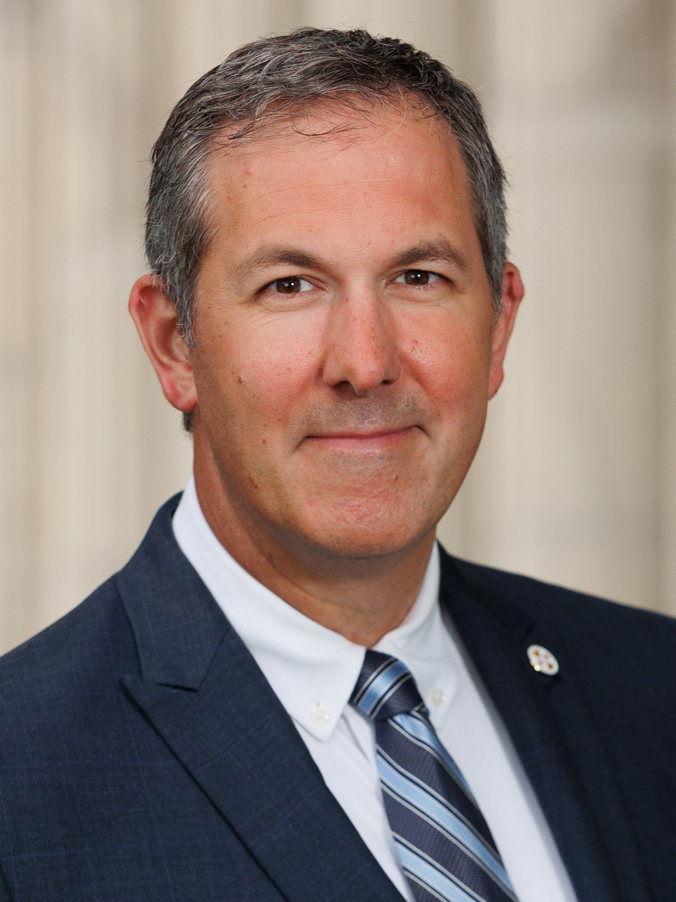

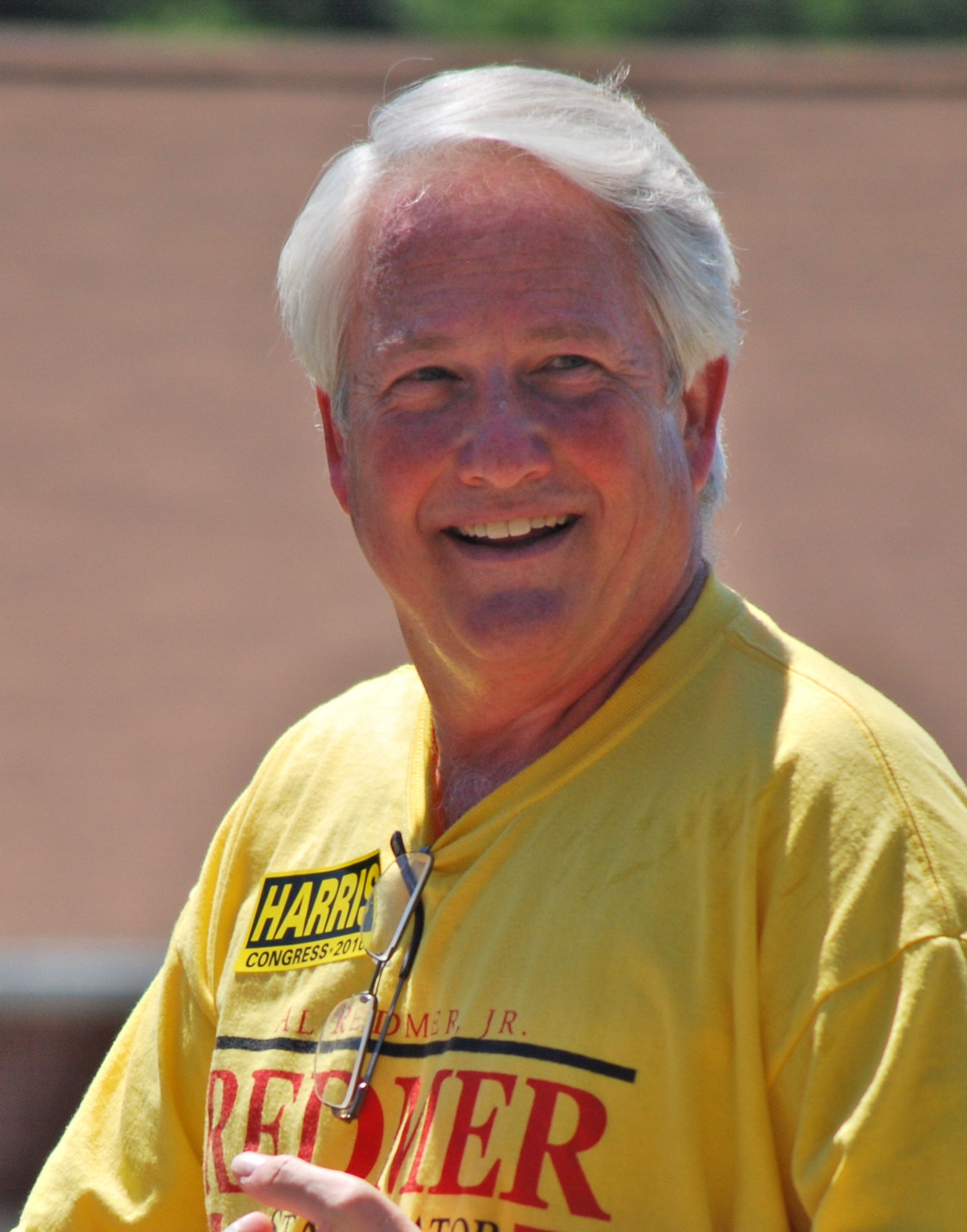
Nominee	Johnny Olszewski	Al Redmer
Party	Democratic	Republican
Popular vote	186,693	135,702
Percentage	57.8%	42.0%
- Olszewski: 50–60% 60–70% 70–80% 80–90% >90% Redmer: 50–60% 60–70% 70–80% 80–90% Tie: 50%
County Executive before election
Don Mohler
Democratic
Elected County Executive
Johnny Olszewski
Democratic

The incumbent county executive, Democrat Baltimore County Executive Kevin Kamenetz, won re-election to a second term in 2014 with 56.1 percent of the vote, but was prevented from seeking a third term due to term limits, creating an open seat.

Kamenetz died on May 10, 2018, making County Administrative Officer Fred Homan acting county executive until May 29, when the Baltimore County Council unanimously voted to appoint Don Mohler as county executive. Mohler did not run for election to a full term.

=== Democratic primary ===
==== Nominee ====
- Johnny Olszewski, former state delegate from the 6th district (2006–2015) and candidate for state senator in 2014

==== Eliminated in primary ====
- Vicki Almond, Baltimore County Councilwoman
- James Brochin, state senator from the 42nd district (2003–present)
- Kevin Francis Marron, perennial candidate

==== Results ====
Results by precinct Olszewski: 30–40%; 40–50%; 50–60%; 60–70%; Brochin: 30–40%; 40–50%; 50–60%; 60–70%; 70–80%; 80–90%; Almond: 30–40%; 40–50%; 50–60%; Tie: 30–40%; 40–50%

Democratic primary results
Party	Candidate	Votes	%
Democratic	Johnny Olszewski	27,820	32.88
Democratic	James Brochin	27,803	32.86
Democratic	Vicki Almond	26,842	31.7
Democratic	Kevin Marron	2,136	2.5
Total votes		84,601	100.0

==== Recount ====
The Democratic Party result was in dispute and runner-up Jim Brochin requested a recount, which commenced on July 12, 2018. On election night, Olszewski finished ahead of Brochin by nearly 350 votes. After absentee ballots were counted, Olszewski finished ahead of Brochin by 9 votes, out of roughly 84,500 cast. Olszewski ended up winning the recount by 17 votes.

=== Republican primary ===
==== Nominee ====
- Al Redmer, State Insurance Commissioner (2003–2005, 2015–present)

==== Eliminated in primary ====
- Pat McDonough, state delegate from the 7th district (2003–2019)

==== Results ====
Results by precinct Redmer: 50–60%; 60–70%; 70–80%; 80–90%; >90%; McDonough: 50–60%; 60–70%; 70–80%; 80–90%; >90%; Tie

Republican primary results
Party	Candidate	Votes	%
Republican	Alfred W. Redmer Jr.	18,058	55.5
Republican	Pat McDonough	14,487	44.5
Total votes		32,545	100

=== General election ===
==== Results ====
Baltimore County Executive election, 2018
Party	Candidate	Votes	%
Democratic	Johnny Olszewski	186,693	57.8
Republican	Al Redmer	135,702	42.0
Write-in		448	0.2
Total votes		322,843	100.0
Democratic hold			

== Frederick County ==
2018 Frederick County executive election
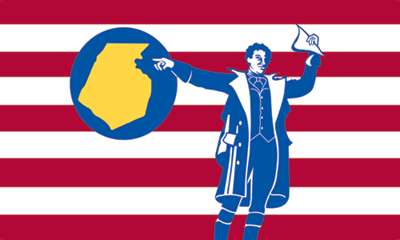

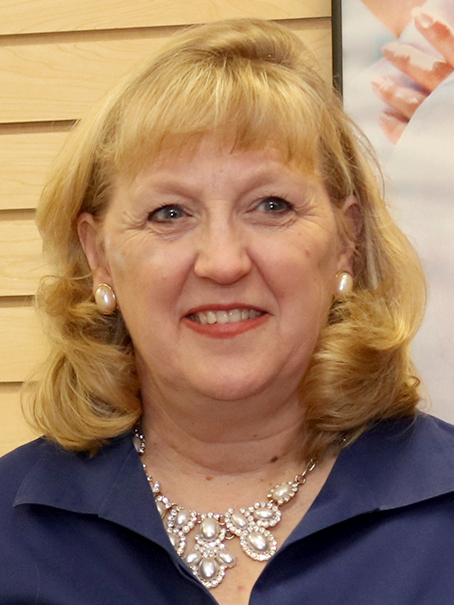

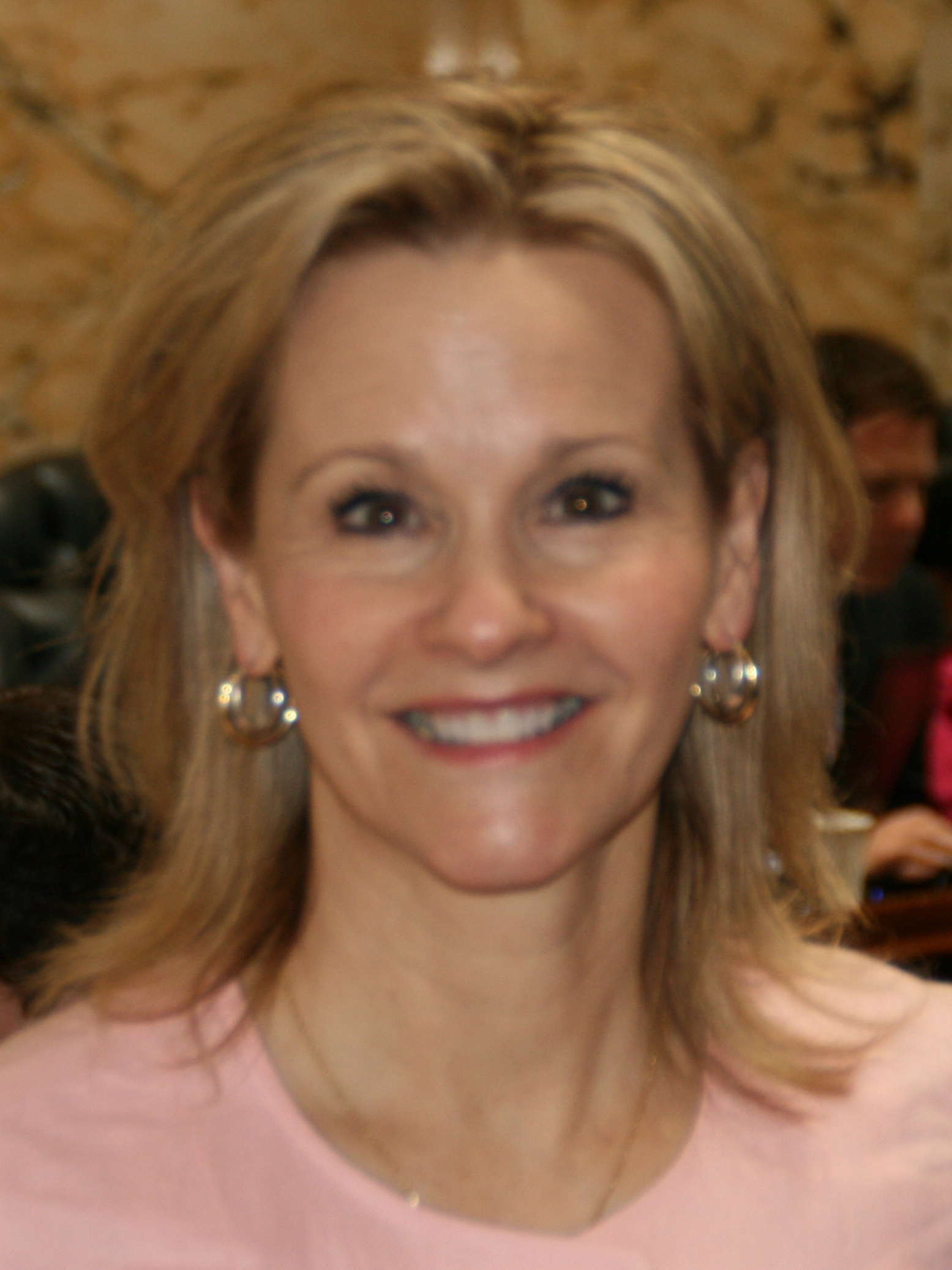
Nominee	Jan Gardner	Kathy Afzali
Party	Democratic	Republican
Popular vote	55,692	46,063
Percentage	52.1%	43.1%
- Gardner: 40–50% 50–60% 60–70% 70–80% Afzali: 40–50% 50–60% 60–70% 70–80% Tie: 50%
County Executive before election
Jan Gardner
Democratic
Elected County Executive
Jan Gardner
Democratic

The incumbent county executive was Democrat Jan Gardner, who was elected as Frederick County's first county executive in 2014 with 53.8 percent of the vote. She was eligible for re-election and sought a second term.

=== Democratic primary ===
==== Nominee ====
- Jan Gardner, incumbent county executive

=== Republican primary ===
==== Nominee ====
- Kathy Afzali, state delegate from the 4th district (2011–present)

==== Eliminated in primary ====
- Kirby Delauter, member of the Frederick County Council from the 5th district (2010–present)
- Regina Williams, former Budget Officer of Frederick County

=== General election ===
==== Results ====
Frederick County Executive election, 2018
Party	Candidate	Votes	%
Democratic	Jan Gardner (incumbent)	55,692	52.1
Republican	Kathy Afzali	46,063	43.1
Independent	Earl Henry Robbins, Jr.	4,944	4.6
Write-in		104	0.1
Total votes		106,803	100.00
Democratic hold			

== Harford County ==
2018 Harford County executive election

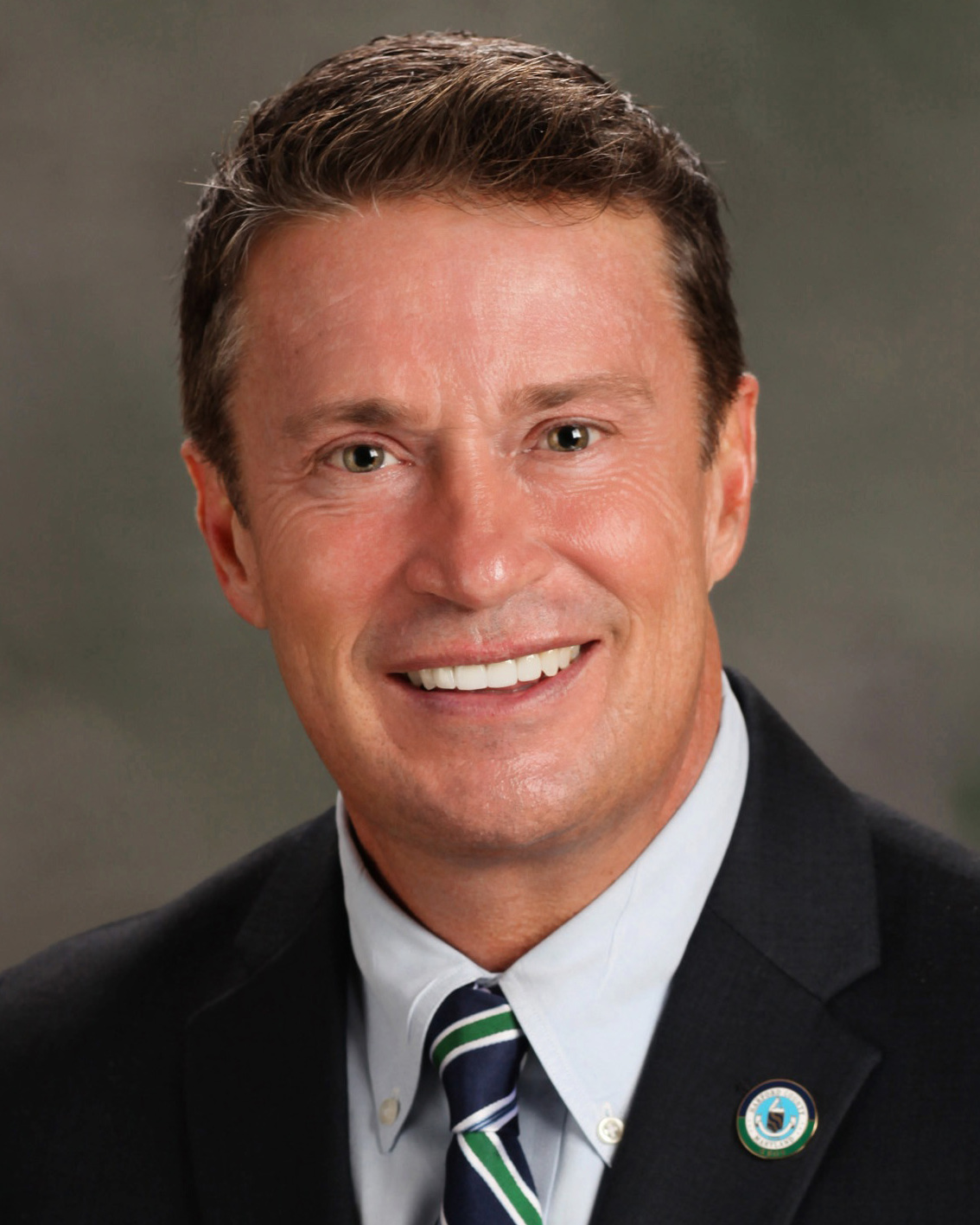

Nominee	Barry Glassman	Maryann Connaghan Forgan
Party	Republican	Democratic
Popular vote	73,908	35,557
Percentage	67.4%	32.4%
- Glassman: 50–60% 60–70% 70–80% 80–90% Forgan: 50–60% 60–70% 70–80% Tie: 50%
County Executive before election
Barry Glassman
Republican
Elected County Executive
Barry Glassman
Republican

The incumbent county executive was Republican Barry Glassman, who was elected in 2014 with 74.8 percent of the vote. He was eligible for re-election and sought a second term.

=== Republican primary ===
==== Nominee ====
- Barry Glassman, incumbent county executive

==== Eliminated in primary ====
- Mike Perrone Jr., member of the Harford County Council from District A (2014–present)

=== Democratic primary ===
==== Nominee ====
- Maryann Connaghan Forgan

=== General election ===
==== Results ====
Harford County Executive election, 2018
Party	Candidate	Votes	%
Republican	Barry Glassman (incumbent)	73,908	67.4
Democratic	Maryann Connaghan Forgan	35,557	32.4
Write-in		237	0.2
Total votes		109,702	100.0
Republican hold			

== Howard County ==
2018 Howard County executive election

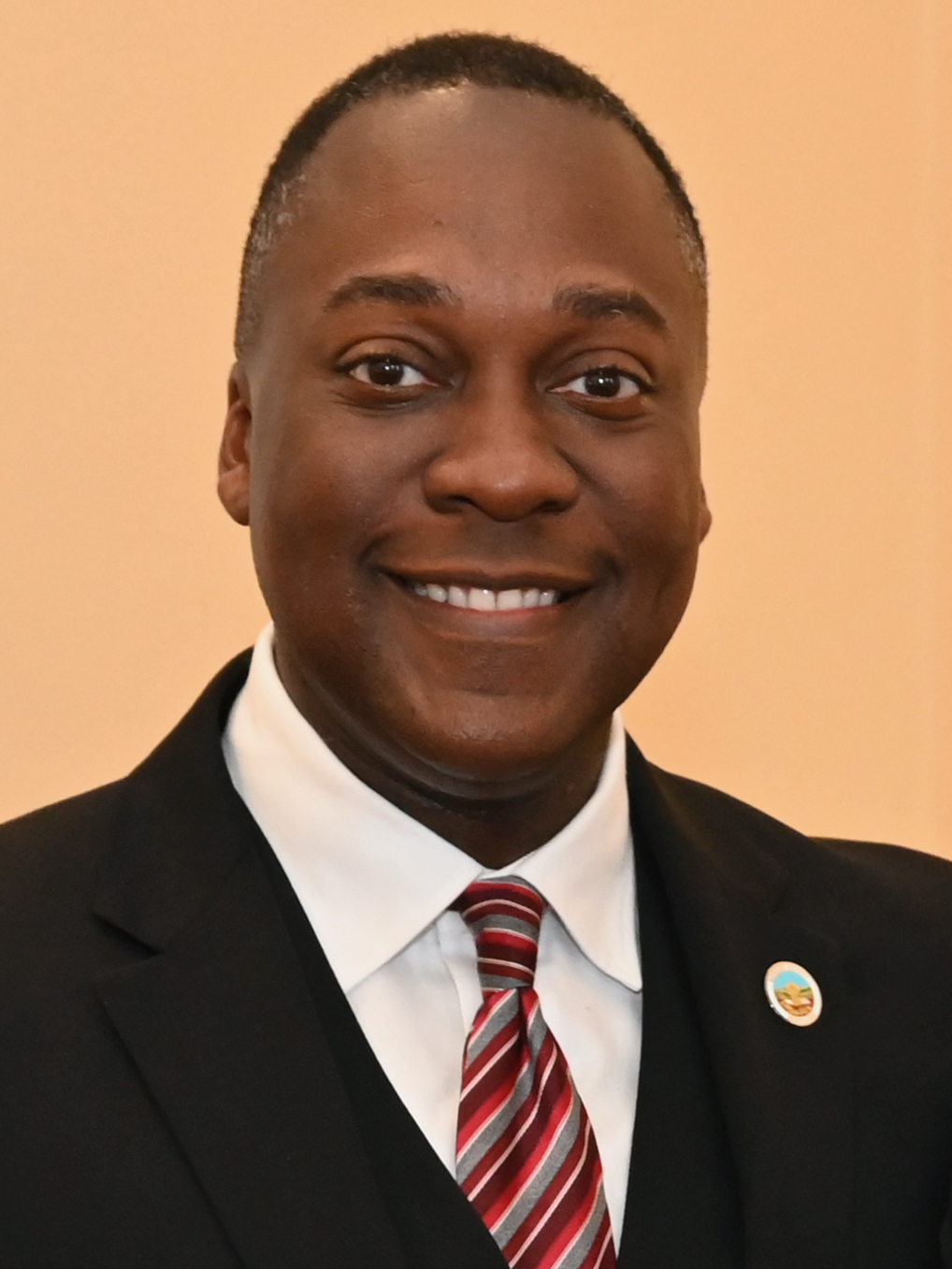

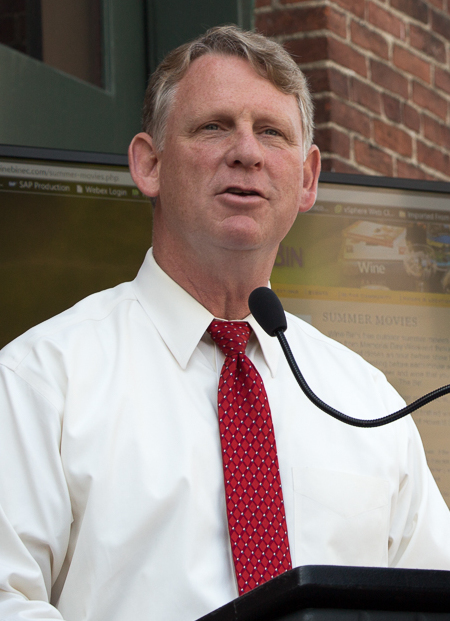
Nominee	Calvin Ball III	Allan Kittleman
Party	Democratic	Republican
Popular vote	75,566	67,457
Percentage	52.8%	47.1%
- Precinct results Ball: 50–60% 60–70% 70–80% Kittleman: 50–60% 60–70% 70–80% 80–90%
County Executive before election
Allan Kittleman
Republican
Elected County Executive
Calvin Ball III
Democratic

The incumbent county executive was Republican Allan H. Kittleman, who was elected in 2014 with 51.2 percent of the vote. He was eligible for re-election and unsuccessfully sought a second term.

=== Republican primary ===
- Allan H. Kittleman, incumbent county executive

=== Democratic primary ===
==== Nominee ====
- Calvin Ball III, member of the Howard County Council from the 2nd district (2006–present)

==== Eliminated in primary ====
- Harry Dunbar, perennial candidate

=== General election ===
==== Results ====
Howard County Executive election, 2018
Party	Candidate	Votes	%
Democratic	Calvin Ball III	75,566	52.8
Republican	Allan H. Kittleman (incumbent)	67,457	47.1
Write-in		124	0.1
Total votes		143,147	100.0
Democratic gain from Republican			

== Montgomery County ==
2018 Montgomery County executive election

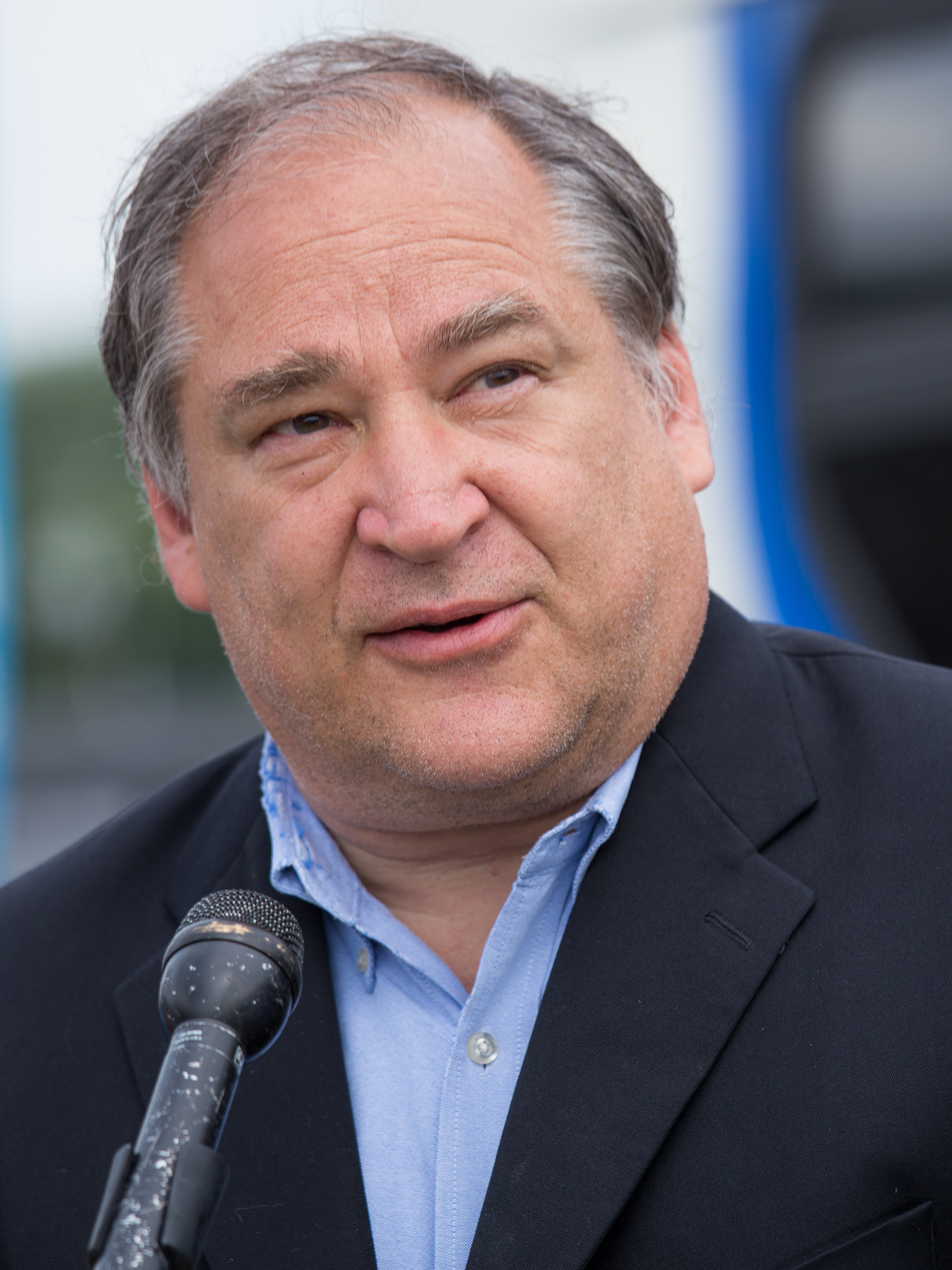

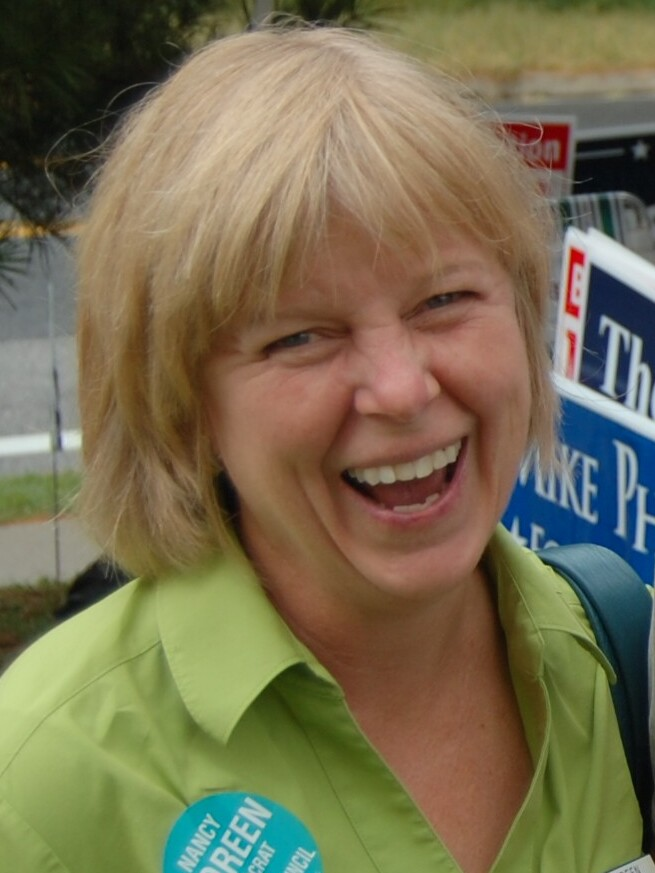

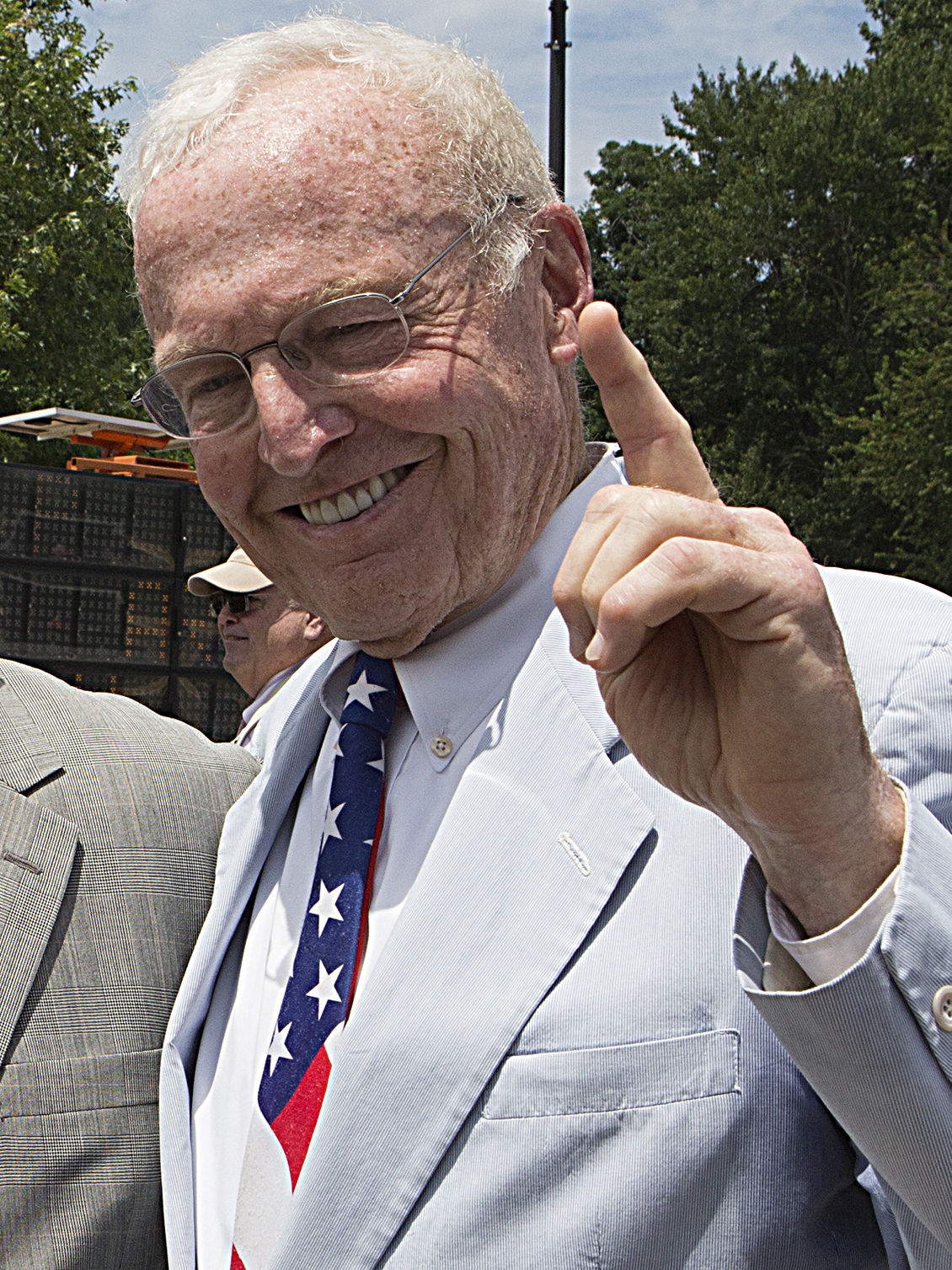
Nominee	Marc Elrich	Nancy Floreen	Robin Ficker
Party	Democratic	Independent	Republican
Popular vote	259,901	76,092	65,096
Percentage	64.7%	19.0%	16.2%
- Precinct results Elrich: 30–40% 40–50% 50–60% 60–70% 70–80% 80–90% Floreen: 40–50% Ficker: 40–50%
County Executive before election
Ike Leggett
Democratic
Elected County Executive
Marc Elrich
Democratic

The incumbent county executive was Democrat Ike Leggett, who was re-elected to a third term in 2014 with 65.3 percent of the vote. He was ineligible to run for re-election due to term limits.

=== Democratic primary ===
==== Nominee ====
- Marc Elrich, at-large member of the Montgomery County Council (2006–present)

==== Eliminated in primary ====
- Roger Berliner, member of the Montgomery County Council from the 1st district (2006–present)
- David Blair, businessman
- William Frick, majority leader of the Maryland House of Delegates (2017–present) from the 16th district (2007–2019)
- Rose Krasnow, former mayor of Rockville
- George Leventhal, at-large member of the Montgomery County Council (2002–present)

==== Results ====
Results by precinct Elrich: 20–30%; 30–40%; 40–50%; 50–60%; >90%; Blair: 20–30%; 30–40%; 40–50%; 50–60%; 60–70%; Krasnow: 20–30%; 30–40%; 40–50%; 50–60%; Tie: 20–30%; 30–40%; 50%

Democratic primary results
Party	Candidate	Votes	%
Democratic	Marc Elrich	37,532	29.0
Democratic	David Blair	37,455	29.0
Democratic	Rose Krasnow	19,644	15.2
Democratic	Roger Berliner	16,710	12.9
Democratic	George L. Leventhal	13,318	10.3
Democratic	Bill Frick	4,687	3.6

=== Republican primary ===
==== Nominee ====
- Robin Ficker, activist and attorney

==== Results ====
Republican primary results
Party	Candidate	Votes	%
Republican	Robin Ficker	11,178	100

=== Independent candidates ===
==== Declared ====
- Nancy Floreen (Independent), at-large member of the Montgomery County Council

=== General election ===
==== Results ====
Montgomery County Executive election, 2018
Party	Candidate	Votes	%
Democratic	Marc Elrich	259,901	64.7
Independent	Nancy Floreen	76,092	19.0
Republican	Robin Ficker	65,096	16.2
Write-in		394	0.1
Total votes		401,483	100.0
Democratic hold			

== Prince George's County ==
2018 Prince George's County executive election

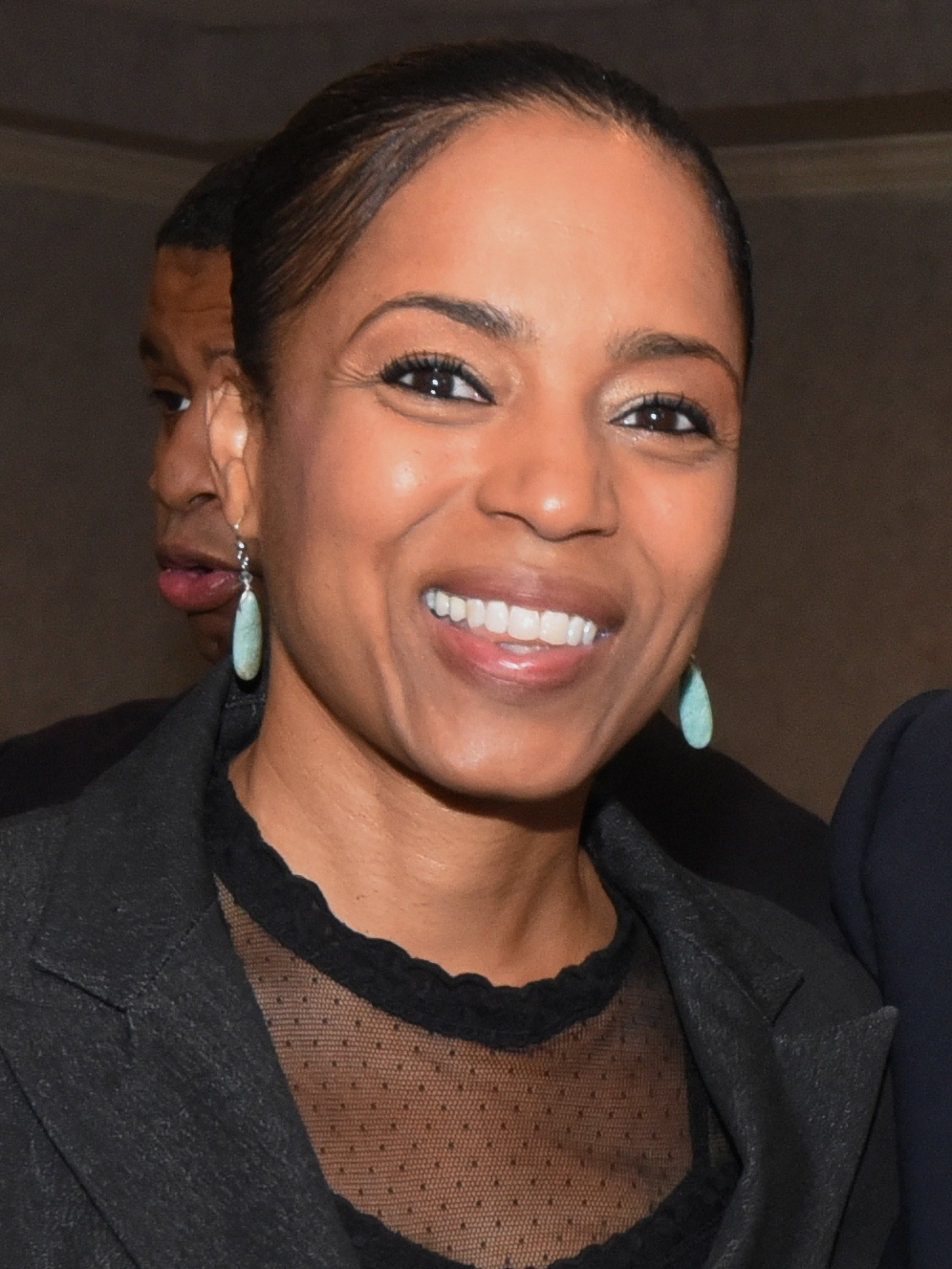
Nominee	Angela Alsobrooks
Party	Democratic
Popular vote	294,372
Percentage	98.9%
County Executive before election
Rushern Baker
Democratic
Elected County Executive
Angela Alsobrooks
Democratic

The incumbent County Executive, Democrat Rushern Baker, was precluded from seeking a third term by term limits.

=== Democratic primary ===
==== Nominee ====
- Angela Alsobrooks, Prince George's County State's Attorney

==== Eliminated in primary ====
- Samuel Bogley, former lieutenant governor of Maryland (1979–1983)
- Billy Bridges
- Donna Edwards, former U.S. Representative from MD-04 (2008–2017) and candidate for U.S. Senate in 2016
- Lewis Johnson, retired U.S. Government Publishing Office employee
- Michael Kennedy
- Paul Monteiro, former Obama administration official and director of AmeriCorps VISTA
- C. Anthony Muse, state senator from the 26th district (2007–present)
- Tommie Thompson

==== Results ====
Results by precinct Alsobrooks: 40–50%; 50–60%; 60–70%; 70–80%; 80–90%; >90%; Edwards: 60–70%

Democratic primary results
Party	Candidate	Votes	%
Democratic	Angela D. Alsobrooks	77,143	61.9
Democratic	Donna Edwards	30,236	24.3
Democratic	C. Anthony Muse	12,515	10.0
Democratic	Paul Monteiro	2,606	2.1
Democratic	Michael Kennedy	658	0.5
Democratic	Tommie Thompson	476	0.4
Democratic	Lewis Johnson	381	0.3
Democratic	Billy Bridges	312	0.3
Democratic	Samuel Bogley	285	0.2
Total votes		124,612	100

=== Republican primary ===
==== Nominee, withdrew after primary ====
- Jerry J. Mathis, real estate agent

==== Results ====
Republican primary results
Party	Candidate	Votes	%
Republican	Jerry J. Mathis	4,145	100
Total votes		4,145	100

=== General election ===
==== Results ====
Republican primary winner Jerry J. Mathis withdrew from the race before the general election and his name did not appear on the ballot.

Prince George's County Executive election, 2018
Party	Candidate	Votes	%
Democratic	Angela Alsobrooks	294,372	98.9
Write-in		3,159	1.1
Total votes		297,531	100.0
Democratic hold			

== Wicomico County ==
2018 Wicomico County executive election
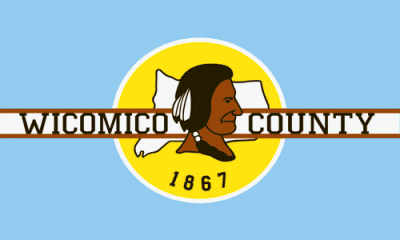

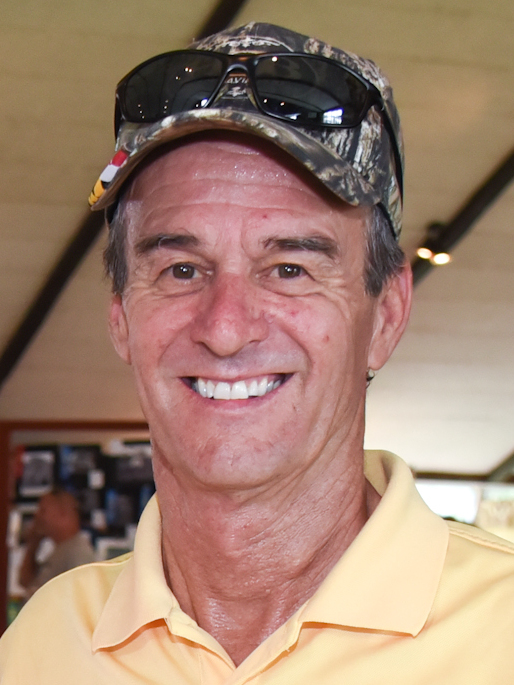

Nominee	Bob Culver	John Hamilton	Jack Heath
Party	Republican	Democratic	Independent
Popular vote	16,278	10,151	7,001
Percentage	48.7%	30.4%	20.9%
- Precinct results Culver: 40–50% 50–60% 60–70% 70–80% Hamilton: 30–40% 40–50% 50–60% 60–70% 70–80%
County Executive before election
Bob Culver
Republican
Elected County Executive
Bob Culver
Republican

The incumbent county executive was Republican Bob Culver, who was elected in 2014 with 55.5 percent of the vote. He was eligible for re-election and ran for a second term.

=== Republican primary ===
==== Nominee ====
- Bob Culver, incumbent county executive

=== Democratic primary ===
==== Nominee ====
- John William Hamilton

=== Independent candidates ===
==== Nominee ====
- Jack Heath, president of the Salisbury city council

=== General election ===
==== Results ====
Wicomico County Executive election, 2018
Party	Candidate	Votes	%
Republican	Robert L. Culver, Jr. (incumbent)	16,278	48.7
Democratic	John William Hamilton	10,151	30.4
Independent	John 'Jack' R. Heath	7,001	20.9
Write-in		14	0.0
Total votes		33,444	100.0
Republican hold			
