= D. Wystan Owen =

American fiction writer

- Education: University of Iowa
- Writing career
- Genre: Fiction
- Website: www.dwystanowen.com

D. Wystan Owen is a British American writer. He is the author of the short story collection Other People's Love Affairs.

== Literary career ==
Owen received an MFA in fiction from the Iowa Writers' Workshop. He was Deputy Editor of The Threepenny Review and one of the founding editors of The Bare Life Review.

=== Other People's Love Affairs ===
Owen's short story collection, Other People's Love Affairs, was published by Algonquin Books in August, 2018. The 10 stories explore the lives of the people in a fictional English village called Glass. His writing of it was inspired by James Joyce's Dubliners and Sherwood Anderson's Winesburg, Ohio.

Publishers Weekly called the book "a lovely work of quiet, heart-wrenching prose," but noted that "readers may wish for some light to balance the sadness." The New York Journal of Books wrote that "the collection’s prevailing tone may be that of quiet melancholy, but it is suffused with joy." For Washington Independent Review of Books: "It’s tempting to believe that all such inner lives are rich and complex — after all, what are we but our most profound desires and primal fears? Owen, however, suggests otherwise. Many of his stories revolve around men and women who don’t know what they want, or, if they do, are incapable of achieving it."

Ploughshares compared it to the works of William Trevor and Yiyun Li, noting: "Both of their influences are clear in the way that Owen studies and inhabits his often-lonely characters, in his exploration of why people behave the way they do, and in his prose." Kirkus Reviews wrote: "While sometimes overly sentimental, this collection shows promise in its darker moments."

Booklist described Owen as "a subtle and keen storyteller whose focus on love and relationships reminds us that headlines and hot topics hold no substance next to tales of the human heart."

== Bibliography ==
- Other People's Love Affairs: Stories (Algonquin Books, 2018)
