= Jan Gardner =

American politician (born 1956)

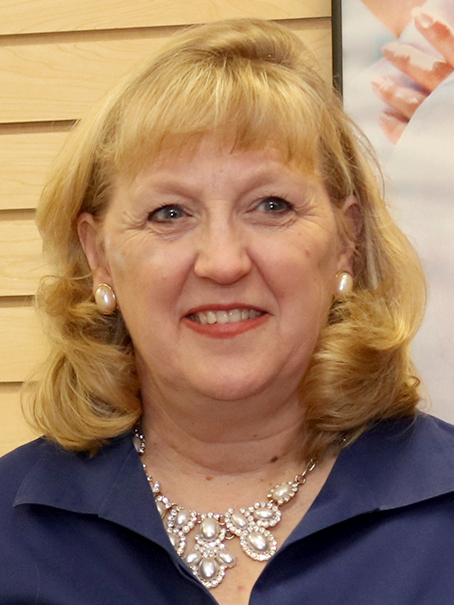
- Gardner in 2018

1st County Executive of Frederick County
- In office December 1, 2014 – December 5, 2022
- Preceded by: Position established
- Succeeded by: Jessica Fitzwater

Personal details
- Born: September 25, 1956 (age 70) Pennsylvania, U.S.
- Party: Democratic
- Children: 3
- Education: University of Notre Dame (BBA); Xavier University (MBA)

Jan H. Gardner (born September 25, 1956) is an American politician who served as the first County Executive of Frederick County, Maryland, from 2014 to 2022. She assumed the office following the county's transition to a charter home rule government, having previously served as a member of the Frederick County Board of County Commissioners from 1998 to 2010. During her time as a commissioner, she spent four years as the board's president and later worked as a state director for U.S. senator Barbara Mikulski. Gardner served three terms as the president of the Maryland Association of Counties (MACo).

== Early life and education ==
Gardner was born in Pennsylvania on September 25, 1956. She is a native of Northwestern Pennsylvania. She attended the University of Notre Dame, where she earned a Bachelor of Business Administration in finance and economics in 1978. She obtained a Master of Business Administration, graduating summa cum laude from Xavier University in 1991.

== Career ==
=== Early career ===
Gardner has experience in accounting, finance, and adult education. She worked in food manufacturing and distribution for the Quaker Oats Company. In the early 1990s, she moved to Frederick County, Maryland.

Her entry into local government began with her service on the Frederick County Planning Commission, where she was a member from 1998 to 2002. Concurrently, she was elected to the Frederick County Board of County Commissioners in 1998. Gardner served as a commissioner for twelve years, until 2010. From December 2006 to December 2010, she served as the President of the Board of County Commissioners.

During her tenure as a commissioner, Gardner became involved with the Maryland Association of Counties (MACo), joining its Board of Directors in 2002. She served as the organization's president in 2007. Gardner was recognized multiple times by The Daily Record as one of "Maryland's Top 100 Women," receiving the honor in 2005 and 2008. In 2006, the Frederick Arts Council named her "Arts Advocate of the Year." Following her time as a commissioner, Gardner worked as the state director for U.S. senator Barbara Mikulski from 2011 to 2013. In 2012, she was again honored by The Daily Record as one of "Maryland's Top 100 Women," entering their "Circle of Excellence."

=== Frederick County Executive ===
During the 2014 Maryland county executive elections, Gardner was elected as the first County Executive of Frederick County, following the county's transition to a charter home rule government. She assumed office on December 1, 2014. During her first year as executive, she served a second term as president of MACo.

During the 2018 Maryland county executive elections, Gardner was re-elected, facing a competitive race against Republican Kathryn Afzali in a jurisdiction with a Republican voter registration advantage. She served two full terms, leaving office on December 5, 2022.

Gardner cited the adoption of the "Livable Frederick Master Plan" as a primary accomplishment of her administration, noting its focus on long-term land use planning. Under her leadership, the county constructed a new Frederick High School and five elementary schools. Her administration's budgets exceeded state-required "maintenance of effort" funding levels for public schools by $113 million. Gardner also emphasized agricultural preservation. Her administration doubled the county's investment in the sector and preserved over 61,000 acres of agricultural land. She stated that her support for the farming community would be her most enduring legacy.

In recognition of her ongoing leadership, she received the Presidential Medal for Leadership from Saint John's Catholic Prep in 2017 and served a third term as president of MACo in 2018. Gardner identified managing the public health impact of the COVID-19 pandemic in Maryland as the greatest challenge of her time in office.

== Personal life ==
As of 2014, Gardner has been married to her husband, John Gardner, for over three decades. They have three children. She credits her mother, a community activist, with instilling in her the values of hard work and community service.
