= Sidney A. Katz =

American politician

Sidney Katz

Member of the Montgomery County Council from District 3
- Incumbent
- Assumed office December 1, 2014
- Preceded by: Phill Andrews
- Constituency: Gaithersburg, Rockville, Washington Grove, Leisure World, and parts of Aspen Hill, Derwood, Potomac, and North Potomac.

Mayor of Gaithersburg
- In office November 1998 – November 10, 2014
- Preceded by: W. Edward Bohrer, Jr.
- Succeeded by: Jud Ashman

Personal details
- Born: Sidney Arnold Katz; March 24, 1950 (age 76) Gaithersburg, Maryland, U.S.
- Party: Democratic
- Spouse: Sally Katz
- Education: University of Maryland (BA)
- Occupation: Politician
- Profession: Businessman
- Website: www.sidneykatz.com

Sidney Arnold Katz (born March 24, 1950) is an American politician and businessman. He currently is a member of the Montgomery County Council representing District 3.

== Early life and education ==
Katz is a lifelong resident of Gaithersburg. His family was the only Jewish one in Gaithersburg. He attended Gaithersburg Elementary and Gaithersburg Middle School. He graduated from Gaithersburg High School in 1968. He attended the University of Maryland, where he received his bachelor's degree in public administration.

== Career ==
Katz was a member of the City of Gaithersburg Planning Commission from 1976 until 1978. He served as a Gaithersburg council member beginning in 1978.

After Mayor W. Edward Bohrer died in office of a stroke in 1998, the Gaithersburg Council appointed Katz the new mayor.

In 2008, Katz supported a law to prohibit seeking work or hiring someone to work while on most city streets, sidewalks, and parking areas. The law was declared unconstitutional by Maryland Attorney General Douglas F. Gansler. Gansler said the law regulated speech in public without being narrowly designed to increase public safety and traffic flow. The City of Gaithersburg accepted the opinions expressed in the Attorney General's letter and the specific Gaithersburg law was not tested in court. Katz said he would find other ways to regulate day laborers.

In 2008, Katz was elected president of the Maryland Municipal League, the association that represents Maryland's 157 cities and towns.

In 2014, Montgomery Council Council Member Phil Andrews announced that he would not run for re-election and would run for County Executive instead. Katz announced he would run to replace Andrews on the County Council representing District 3. Katz's campaign focused on early childhood education, after-school programs, and career and technical training. Katz won the Democratic Party primary election. With no opponent on the general election ballot, Katz won the general election in 2014. His term began on December 1, 2014. He sits on the government operations and public safety committee.

== Personal life ==
He was the co-owner, along with other family members, of Wolfson's Department Store on East Diamond Avenue in Gaithersburg from 1971 until he closed the store on October 26, 2013. The business was started by his grandparents, Jacob and Rose Wolfson, in 1918.

Katz is married to Sally Katz, a pupil personnel worker for Montgomery County Public Schools, and is the father of two adult children. He lives in the Pheasant Run neighborhood of Gaithersburg.
