= Jessica Fitzwater =

American politician (born 1983)

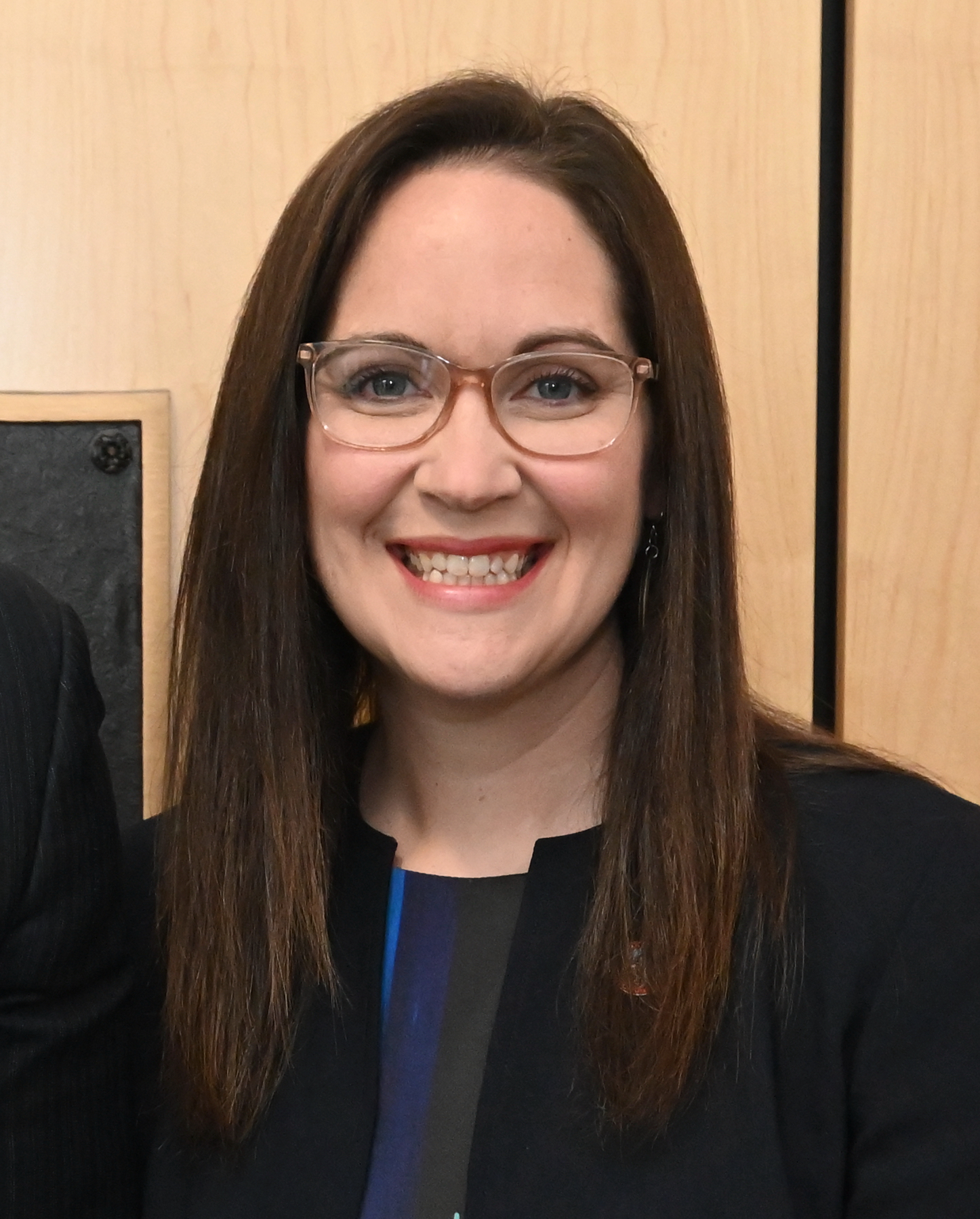
- Fitzwater in 2023

2nd County Executive of Frederick County
- Incumbent
- Assumed office December 5, 2022
- Preceded by: Jan Gardner

Personal details
- Born: December 26, 1983 (age 42) Smithsburg, Maryland, U.S.
- Party: Democratic
- Children: 2
- Education: St. Mary's College of Maryland (B.A.); Hood College (M.S.)

Jessica E. Fitzwater (born December 26, 1983) is an American politician and educator currently serving as the Frederick County Executive in Maryland, a position she has held since December 2022. Prior to her election as executive, she represented District 4 on the Frederick County Council from 2014 to 2022. During her tenure in local government, she has focused on legislation regarding workforce housing, immigrant affairs, and labor standards. A former music teacher and violinist, Fitzwater was recognized as the National Education Association's Political Activist of the Year in 2014.

== Early life and education ==
Born in Smithsburg, Maryland, Fitzwater has lived in the state her entire life. She grew up in Smithsburg, where she was influenced by her father, a musician, and began playing music as a child. Her primary instrument is the violin, which she started playing in the fifth grade. Her mother is a retired special education teacher.

Fitzwater earned a B.A. in music from St. Mary's College of Maryland in 2005. She completed a M.S. in educational leadership at Hood College in 2010. In 2013, she completed Emerge Maryland, a training program designed to prepare Democratic women for political office.

== Career ==
From 2005 to 2022, Fitzwater was a music teacher at Oakdale Elementary School in Frederick County Public Schools. Her advocacy work in education was recognized in 2014 when she was named the National Education Association's Political Activist of the Year. She was also active in labor leadership, serving on the Board of Directors for the Frederick County Teachers Association from 2011 to 2014.

Fitzwater has been a violinist with the Frederick Symphony Orchestra since 2005 and served as the secretary of the orchestra's board of directors from 2006 to 2012.

Fitzwater was first elected to the Frederick County Council in 2014 to represent District 4, holding the seat from December 1, 2014, until December 5, 2022. She faced no opposition in the Democratic primary elections for either of her council terms.

During her tenure on the council, Fitzwater championed the repeal of the county's English-only ordinance. She played a role in creating the Frederick County Immigrant Affairs Commission and served as a member of the Frederick County Human Trafficking Task Force from 2016 to 2018. Additionally, she sponsored legislation focused on expanding affordable workforce housing options.

=== Frederick County Executive ===
During the 2022 Maryland county executive elections, Fitzwater launched a campaign for Frederick County Executive to replace the incumbent Jan Gardner, who was term-limited. She secured the Democratic nomination by winning a three-way primary with 58 percent of the vote. In the general election, she defeated Republican state senator Michael Hough by a margin of 989 votes, capturing 50.4 percent of the total vote against his 49.46 percent. She was sworn in on December 5, 2022, becoming only the second County Executive in Frederick County's history.

As County Executive, Fitzwater has pursued initiatives to address local housing and economic needs. She announced plans to appraise county-owned land to identify opportunities for affordable housing development. During the 2025 U.S. federal government shutdown, she implemented expanded health benefits and increased the minimum wage for full-time county employees to $21 per hour. Her administration also approved regulations for data centers, which expanded approved land for data center development to over 2,600 acres. In January 2025, Fitzwater announced the county's intention to intervene in the state approval proceedings for the Maryland Piedmont Reliability Project (MPRP).

In October 2025, Fitzwater announced she was running for re-election in the 2026 Maryland county executive elections.

== Personal life ==
Fitzwater is Jewish, observing the faith of her mother's family. Her father was not religious. In 2012, she married Gerald Bigelow. He died in 2019 while she was pregnant with their second child. She had been a resident of Frederick, Maryland since the mid-2000s.
