= Kathy Afzali =

American politician (born 1957)

Kathryn L. Afzali
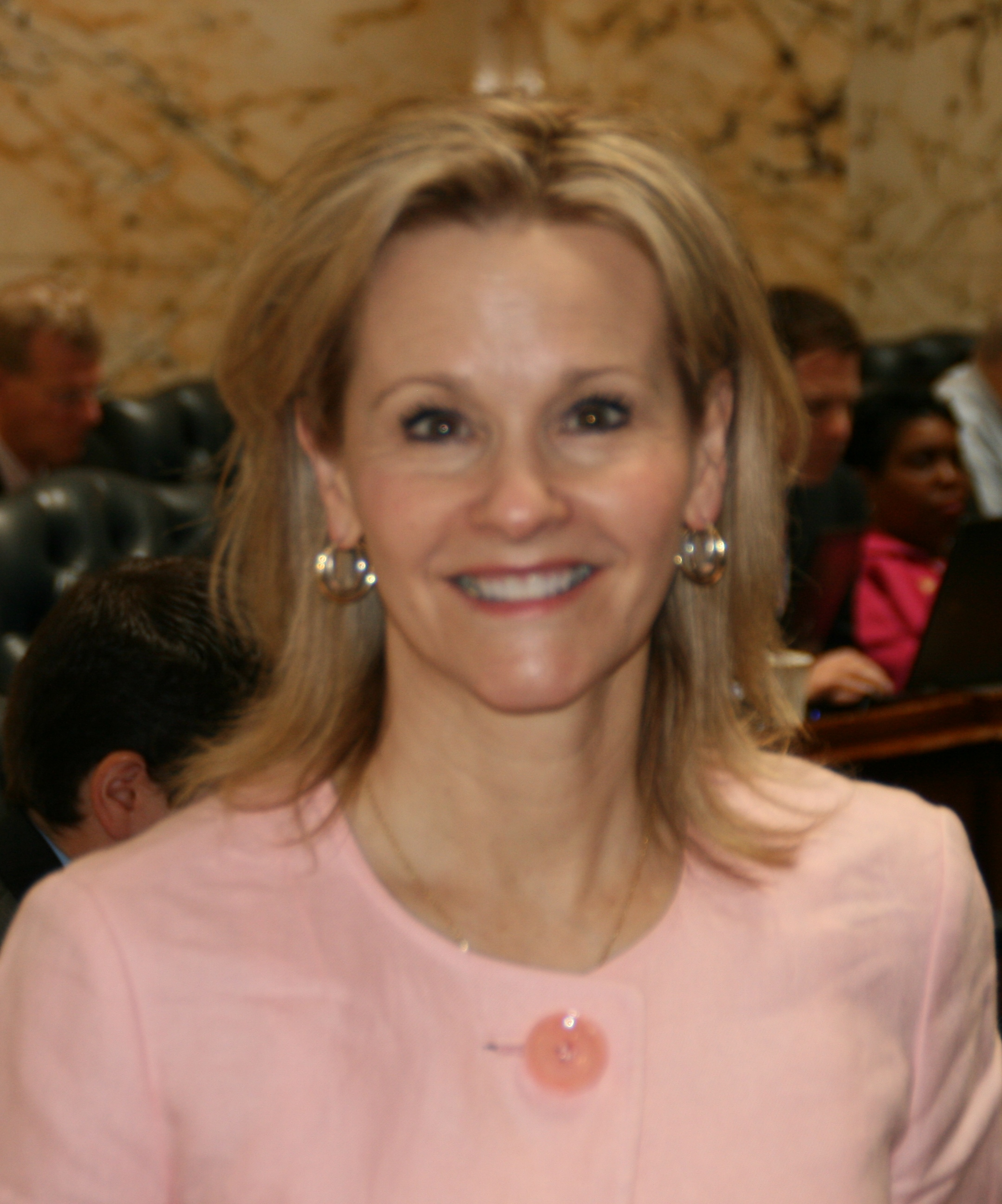

Member of the Maryland House of Delegates from the 4th district
- In office January 12, 2011 – January 9, 2019
- Preceded by: Joseph R. Bartlett; Paul S. Stull
- Succeeded by: Dan Cox; Jesse Pippy
- Constituency: District 4A (2011–2015); District 4 (2015–2019)

Personal details
- Born: May 27, 1957 (age 69) San Francisco, California, U.S.
- Party: Republican
- Spouse: David
- Children: 2
- Education: Mount St. Mary's University (BS)
- Occupation: Business Woman

Kathryn L. Afzali (born May 27, 1957) is an American politician who represented the fourth district in the Maryland House of Delegates from 2011 to 2019. She was the Republican nominee for Frederick County Executive in 2018, losing to incumbent Jan Gardner.

== Background ==
Afzali was born and raised in the San Francisco Bay area. She is a graduate of Mount St. Mary's University. She was a columnist for the Frederick News-Post from 2003 to 2006.

== Career ==
Afzali was sworn in as a member of the Maryland House of Delegates on January 12, 2011. She was assigned to the House Ways and Means Committee and to its Election Law and Education subcommittees. She served as the Ranking Republican on Ways and Means. She is also a member of the Women Legislators of Maryland.

By the end of Afzali's first legislative session in Annapolis, she sponsored or co-sponsored forty-nine bills.

== 2012 Congressional election ==
Governor Martin O'Malley proposed, and Maryland General Assembly adopted, a redistricting plan that reconfigured Republican incumbent U.S. Congressman Roscoe Bartlett's 6th congressional district to one that Barack Obama won in the 2008 United States presidential election. The previous version of the district had President Obama at 40%, while the newly redrawn district had President Obama at 56%.

On January 11, 2012, believing that Bartlett would be retiring, Afzali announced her intention to run for the GOP nomination to represent Maryland's 6th congressional district. Bartlett eventually decided to run for reelection. He won the primary election with 44% of the vote in a crowded field but went on to lose the general election.

== 2018 Frederick County Executive election ==
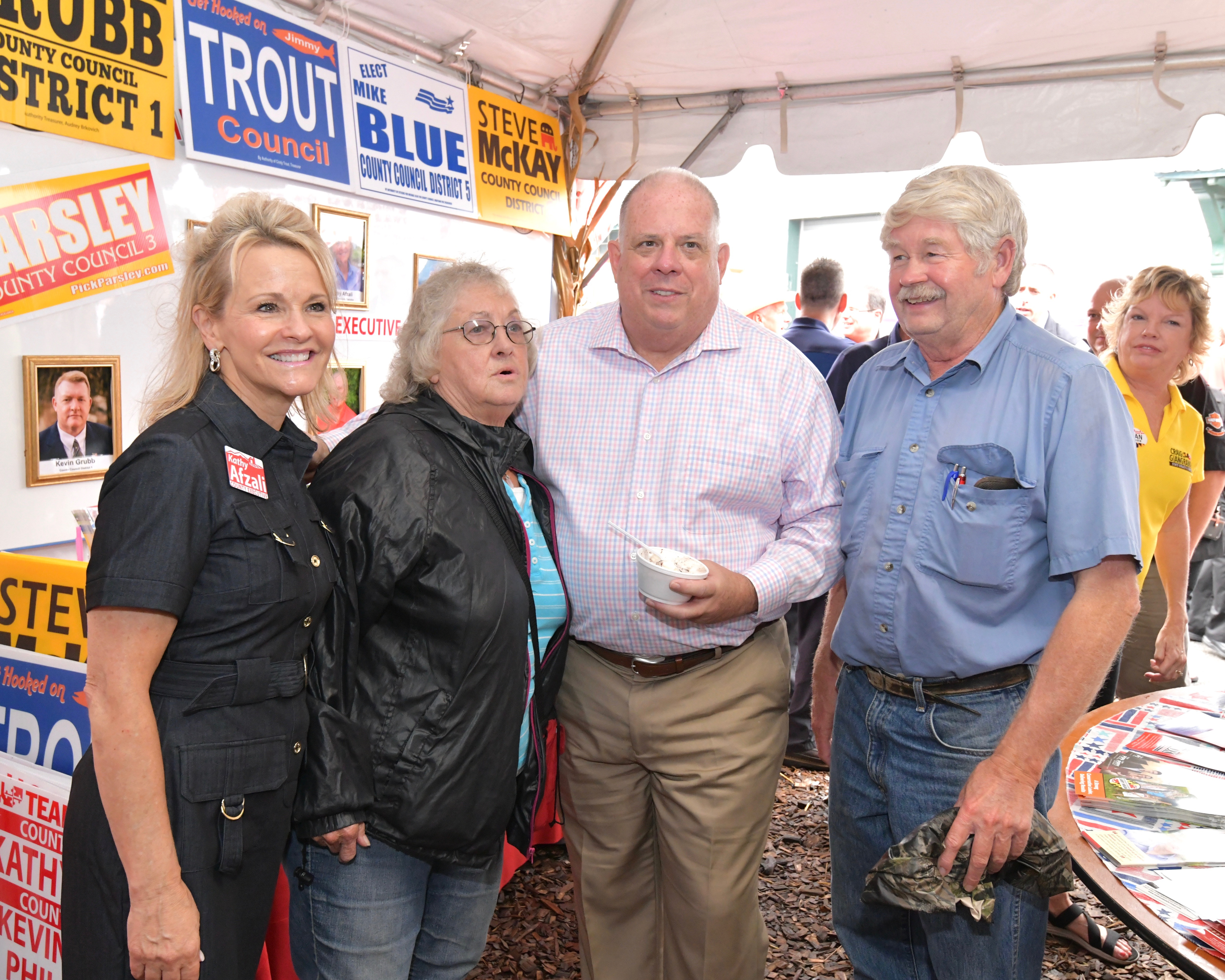
Afzali with Maryland governor Larry Hogan, 2018

Afzali won the Republican primary on June 26, 2018 with 42.7 percent of the vote. She was defeated by incumbent Democratic County Executive Jan Gardner in the general election, receiving 43.1 percent of the vote to Gardner's 52.1 percent. After her loss, Afzali stepped down from the Frederick County Republican Central Committee.

== Personal life ==
Afzali is a member of the Grace Community Church of Frederick. She is a Life Member of the National Rifle Association of America.

== Political positions ==
=== Agriculture ===
Her first successful piece of legislation was a honey standard which passed unanimously through both chambers and has been used as a model in other states.

She introduced a Farm Estate Tax bill that eliminated state inheritance taxes for family farms.

=== Crime ===
Afzali has sponsored legislation to increase sanctions on drunk drivers with multiple offenses, and was responsible for "Anayah's Law", which allows Child Protective Services to be relieved of its obligation to reunite children with their parent if the parent has committed "severe physical abuse" against the child.

In her second year, she pushed for legislation to require a photo ID when voting in the state of Maryland.

In 2013, she co-sponsored legislation that would make cyber-bullying a child a misdemeanor.

During the 2018 legislative session, Afzali introduced legislation to ban telemarketers and others from falsifying the origin of their calls and establish a penalty for providing false location information.

=== National politics ===
Afzali endorsed Mitt Romney for president on September 8, 2011. Afzali endorsed Ted Cruz for president on April 21, 2016.

=== Paid sick leave ===
In 2018, Afzali voted to sustain Governor Larry Hogan's veto on a bill to required employers with 15 or more employees to provide earned sick leave.

=== Taxes ===
In 2018, Afzali testified in support of legislation to extend tax credits to police officers in high-crime neighborhoods to transit police.

During her county executive campaign, Afzali said that she would freeze property taxes in her first 100 days. She also said that she supported "slower growth" with less high-density development to keep the county from having to raise taxes.

== Electoral history ==
Maryland House of Delegates District 4A Republican Primary Election, 2010
Party	Candidate	Votes	%
Republican	Kathy Afzali	3,454	22.5
Republican	Kelly M. Schulz	3,399	22.13
Republican	Paul S. Stull	3,393	22.09
Republican	Dino E. Flores, Jr.	2,759	18.0
Republican	John L. "Lennie" Thompson, Jr.	2,354	15.3

Maryland House of Delegates District 4A Election, 2010
Party	Candidate	Votes	%
Republican	Kelly Schulz	16,952	32.2
Republican	Kathy Afzali	16,683	31.7
Democratic	Ryan P. Trout	9,678	18.4
Democratic	Bonita Riffle Currey	6,993	13.3
Unaffiliated	Scott L. Guenthner	2,150	4.1
Write-in	Other Write-Ins	162	0.3

Maryland House of Delegates District 4 Election, 2014
Party	Candidate	Votes	%
Republican	Kelly Schulz	33,753	31.0
Republican	Kathy Afzali	31,128	28.5
Republican	David E. Vogt III	27,313	25.1
Democratic	Gene Stanton	16,493	15.1
Write-in	Other Write-Ins	346	0.3

Frederick County Executive Republican Primary Election, 2018
Party	Candidate	Votes	%
Republican	Kathy Afzali	6,898	42.7
Republican	Kirby Delauter	5,250	32.5
Republican	Regina M. Williams	4,000	24.8

Frederick County Executive Election, 2018
Party	Candidate	Votes	%
Democratic	Jan H. Gardner	55,692	52.1
Republican	Kathy Afzali	46,063	43.1
Unaffiliated	Earl Henry Robbins, Jr.	4,944	4.6
Write-in	Other Write-Ins	104	0.1
