= Nancy Floreen =

American politician (born 1951)

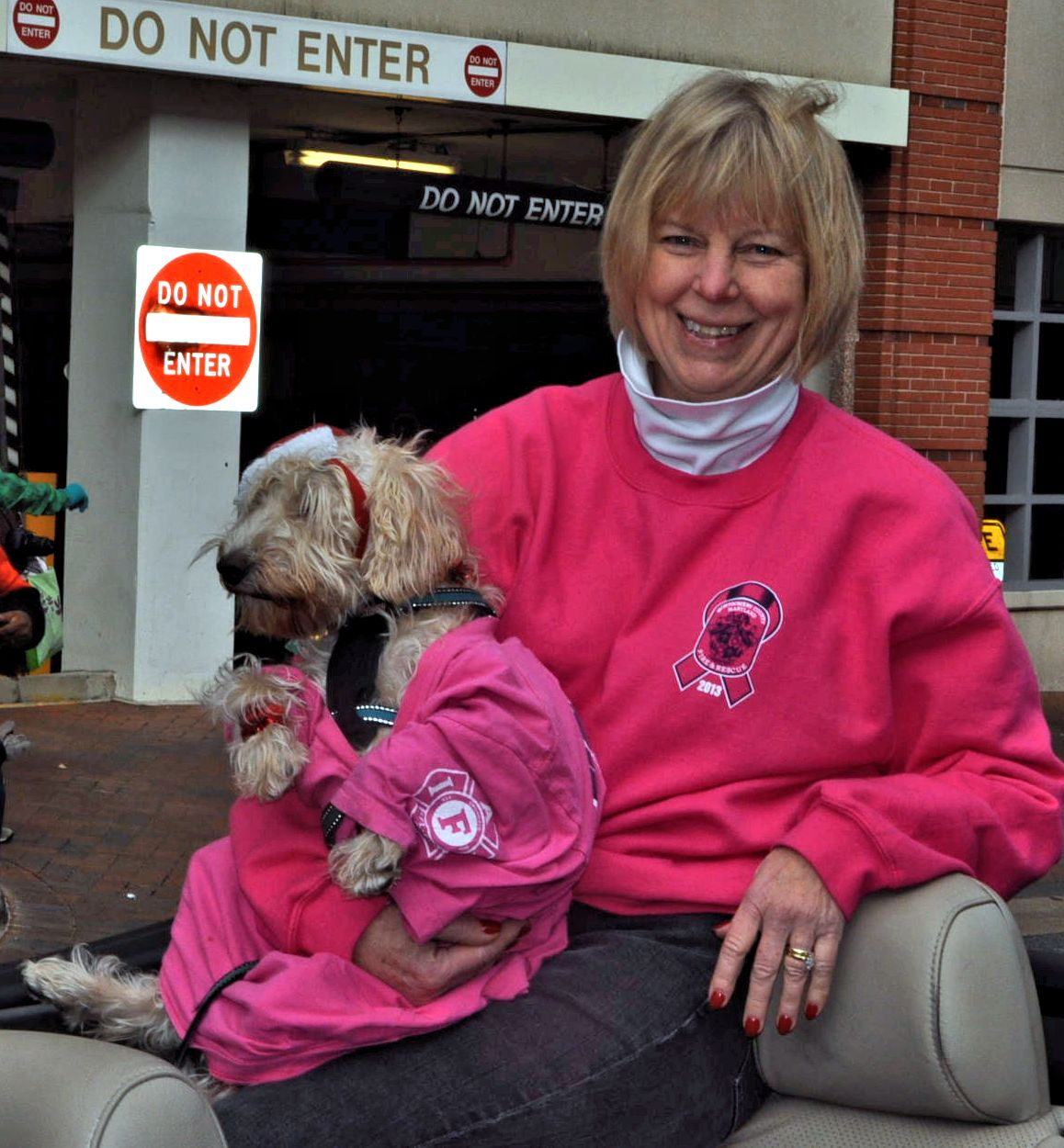
- Floreen in 2013

Member of the Montgomery County Council, At Large
- In office 2002–2018

Mayor, Town of Garrett Park
- In office 2000–2012
- Preceded by: Peter Benjamin
- Succeeded by: Peter Benjamin

Montgomery County Planning Board
- In office 1986–1994
- Preceded by: Mable Granke
- Succeeded by: Arthur Holmes, Jr.

Personal details
- Born: September 29, 1951 (age 75) Boston, Massachusetts, U.S.
- Party: Independent (2018–present); Democratic (until 2018)
- Spouse: David O. Stewart
- Children: 3
- Education: Smith College, Rutgers University School of Law–Newark
- Profession: Attorney

Nancy M. Floreen (born September 29, 1951) is an American politician who was a member of the Montgomery County Council in Maryland from 2002 to 2018, serving four terms. She previously served two terms on the Montgomery County Planning Board from 1986 to 1994, was mayor of Garrett Park, Maryland from 2000 to 2002, and ran unsuccessfully as an independent for Montgomery County Executive in 2018.

== Early years ==
Floreen was born in Boston, Massachusetts, on September 29, 1951. She graduated from Smith College with a bachelor of arts degree in American Studies in 1973. She earned a Juris Doctor from Rutgers University School of Law–Newark in 1976.

In 1983, the Montgomery County Department of Environmental Protection allowed Permanent Financial Corporation to build an office building at Wayne and Cedar avenues in downtown Silver Spring that was taller, wider, and closer to the street than county code allowed. Floreen represented a group of nine families living nearby who protested the building's violations. Floreen argued that constructing a building prior to the discovery of zoning violations does not excuse the builder from the compliance, nor does it allow them an automatic zoning variance. The Allied Civic Group, a coalition of county civic associations, awarded Floreen its Thomas B. Cook Award for her work representing the families in the case. The Montgomery County Board of Appeals rejected Permanent Financial Corporation's request for after-the-fact building variances, and the Montgomery County Circuit Court subsequently upheld that decision, ruling that the owner must remove the top two floors of the building and make other modifications to the building to comply with zoning codes.

In 1985, the Montgomery County Zoning Board approved construction of a six-story residential building for elders in Silver Spring. The building was to be built on land zoned for single-family homes. Floreen represented the Woodside Civic Association in its appeal of the decision, saying the building would be too dense for the neighborhood, and that the fact that there were already large buildings in nearby downtown Silver Spring was irrelevant.

== Political career ==
=== Montgomery County Planning Board ===
Floreen became a member of the Montgomery County Planning Board in 1986. The Montgomery County Council appointed her with a vote of 5 to 2, although the Council later moved to officially record the vote as unanimous. Floreen succeeded Mable Granke after her term expired. Floreen said she would give up her part-time law practice to sit on the board in order to avoid any conflict.

The board considered a $250 million development plan for downtown Silver Spring in 1988. The plan included retail, office, and hotel space. Floreen was opposed to the plan, saying it was too much too soon, and she was particularly to the proposed three-story bridge over Georgia Avenue.

Because members of the Planning Board are limited to two four-year terms, Floreen stepped down from the board in 1994.

=== Mayor of Garrett Park ===
Floreen was elected mayor of the town of Garrett Park in 2000. While mayor, she supported a renovation to Penn Place, a 104-year-old Victorian house and one of the oldest buildings in the town. The building's porches were rebuilt, previous alterations were removed, and the building was brought up to building codes, safety standards, and historical preservation requirements.

=== Montgomery County Council ===
Floreen ran for an at-large seat on the Montgomery County Council in 2002. Her campaign focused on reducing traffic, building the Intercounty Connector, expanding all-day kindergarten, reducing class sizes, and increasing funding for health and human services. Her candidacy was endorsed by Montgomery County Executive Douglas M. Duncan and the editorial board of the Washington Post. She received enough votes in the Democratic Party primary to advance to the general election, and she won a seat on the Council during the general election.

On the subject of transportation, Floreen has supported building the Intercounty Connector, supported building Montrose Parkway, and opposed establishing bus rapid transit between Bethesda and Silver Spring,

On development, Floreen supported increases to the recordation and transfer taxes, supported lifting restrictions on the height of buildings in the southern part of the county, supported lifting residential construction bans in the central part of the county, supported strengthening the county's Moderately Priced Dwelling Unit program, supported requiring ten percent of homes built in new developments near Metro stations be set aside for middle-income families, opposed increasing taxes on developers, opposed closing two MARC train stations with low ridership, and opposed reducing the maximum allowable height of a residential house height from 35 feet to 30 feet.

On environmental issues, she supported removing trash cans from most county parks and supported increasing the fine for deliberately violating the county's forest conservation law.

She also supported banning smoking in restaurants and bars, opposed cutting the Montgomery County Public Libraries' budget, opposed a plan to import lower-cost prescription drugs from Canada for county employees and retirees, and supported a law requiring permits for lawn signs displayed for more than 30 days.

Floreen was reelected in 2006, 2010, and 2014.

=== Montgomery County Executive race ===
In the 2018 race for Montgomery County Executive, Floreen endorsed Rose Krasnow, who came in third behind businessman David Blair and long-time Montgomery County Council Member Marc Elrich in the Democratic Party primary. Floreen subsequently switched her party affiliation from Democrat to independent (unaffiliated) and filed to enter the race for Montgomery County executive, submitting 20,343 signatures to election officials by the deadline of August 6, 2018. She faced Elrich and Republican Robin Ficker, a local attorney and sports heckler, in the November general election. Floreen positioned herself as a moderate alternative to Elrich and campaigned for support from centrist Republicans, independents, and Democrats dissatisfied with Elrich. On November 6, Floreen was defeated in the general election for County Executive by Marc Elrich, who won the three-way race with 64.4% of the vote.

== Personal life ==
Floreen lives in Potomac, Maryland, with her husband, David O. Stewart. She has three adult children and three grandchildren.

== Electoral history ==
=== 2002 ===
2002 General Election, Montgomery County Council, At-Large
| Party | Candidate | Votes | % |
|---|---|---|---|
| Democratic | Nancy Floreen | 184,528 | 20 |
| Democratic | Steven Silverman | 182,834 | 20 |
| Democratic | Michael L. Subin | 181,856 | 20 |
| Democratic | George L. Leventhal | 172,631 | 19 |
| Republican | Scott Dyer | 95,775 | 11 |
| Republican | Joe Dollar | 89,262 | 10 |
| | Write-in | 5,164 | 1 |

=== 2006 ===
2006 General Election, Montgomery County Council, At-Large
| Party | Candidate | Votes | % |
|---|---|---|---|
| Democratic | Nancy Floreen | 193,269 | 18 |
| Democratic | George L. Leventhal | 191,037 | 18 |
| Democratic | Marc Elrich | 185,667 | 17 |
| Democratic | Duchy Trachtenberg | 182,998 | 17 |
| Republican | Steve Abrams | 96,586 | 9 |
| Republican | Tom Reinheimer | 76,452 | 7 |
| Republican | Shelly Skolnick | 73,809 | 7 |
| Republican | Amber Gnemi | 71,121 | 7 |
| | Write-in | 1,119 | 0 |

=== 2010 ===
2010 Democratic Party Primary Election, Montgomery County Council, At-Large
| Party | Candidate | Votes | % |
|---|---|---|---|
| Democratic | Marc Elrich | 47,839 | 18 |
| Democratic | Hans Riemer | 40,493 | 15 |
| Democratic | Nancy Floreen | 39,500 | 15 |
| Democratic | George L. Leventhal | 38,761 | 14 |
| Democratic | Duchy Trachtenberg | 34,780 | 13 |
| Democratic | Rebecca R. Wagner | 32,213 | 12 |
| Democratic | Jane de Winter | 15,171 | 6 |
| Democratic | Fred Evans | 10,989 | 4 |
| Democratic | Raj Narayanan | 8,751 | 3 |

2010 General Election, Montgomery County Council, At-Large
| Party | Candidate | Votes | % |
|---|---|---|---|
| Democratic | Marc Elrich | 179,008 | 17 |
| Democratic | Nancy Floreen | 177,572 | 17 |
| Democratic | George L. Leventhal | 169,912 | 16 |
| Democratic | Hans Riemer | 166,130 | 16 |
| Republican | Robert Dyer | 82,773 | 8 |
| Republican | Mark D. Fennel | 81,634 | 8 |
| Republican | Brandon Rippeon | 80,635 | 8 |
| Republican | Robin N. Uncapher | 78,075 | 8 |
| Green | George Gluck | 16,359 | 2 |
| | Write-in | 1,065 | 0 |

=== 2014 ===
2014 Democratic Party Primary Election, Montgomery County Council, At-Large
| Party | Candidate | Votes | % |
|---|---|---|---|
| Democratic | Marc Elrich | 57,563 | 21 |
| Democratic | Nancy Floreen | 53,924 | 19 |
| Democratic | Hans Riemer | 49,932 | 18 |
| Democratic | George L. Leventhal | 46,286 | 17 |
| Democratic | Beth Daly | 39,642 | 15 |
| Democratic | Vivian Malloy | 25,599 | 9 |

2014 General Election, Montgomery County Council, At-Large
| Party | Candidate | Votes | % |
|---|---|---|---|
| Democratic | Marc Elrich | 160,914 | 17 |
| Democratic | Nancy M. Floreen | 159,030 | 17 |
| Democratic | George L. Leventhal | 150,902 | 16 |
| Democratic | Hans Riemer | 143,048 | 15 |
| Republican | Shelly Skolnick | 81,698 | 9 |
| Republican | Robert Dyer | 80,991 | 8 |
| Republican | Chris P. Fiotes, Jr. | 73,355 | 8 |
| Republican | Adol Woen-Williams | 67,034 | 7 |
| Green | Tim Willard | 22,274 | 2 |

=== 2018 ===
2018 Montgomery County Executive
| Party | Candidate | Votes | % |
|---|---|---|---|
| Democratic | Marc Elrich | 225,900 | 64.3% |
| Independent | Nancy Floreen | 67,402 | 19.2% |
| Republican | Robin Ficker | 57,489 | 16.4% |
| Write-ins | | 356 | 0.1% |
| Majority | | 158,498 | 45.1% |
| Total votes | | 351,150 | 100.0% |

Political offices
| Preceded by Blair G. Ewing | Montgomery County Council; At Large; 2002–2018 | Succeeded by {{{after}}} |
