= David O. Stewart =

American writer and attorney (born 1951)

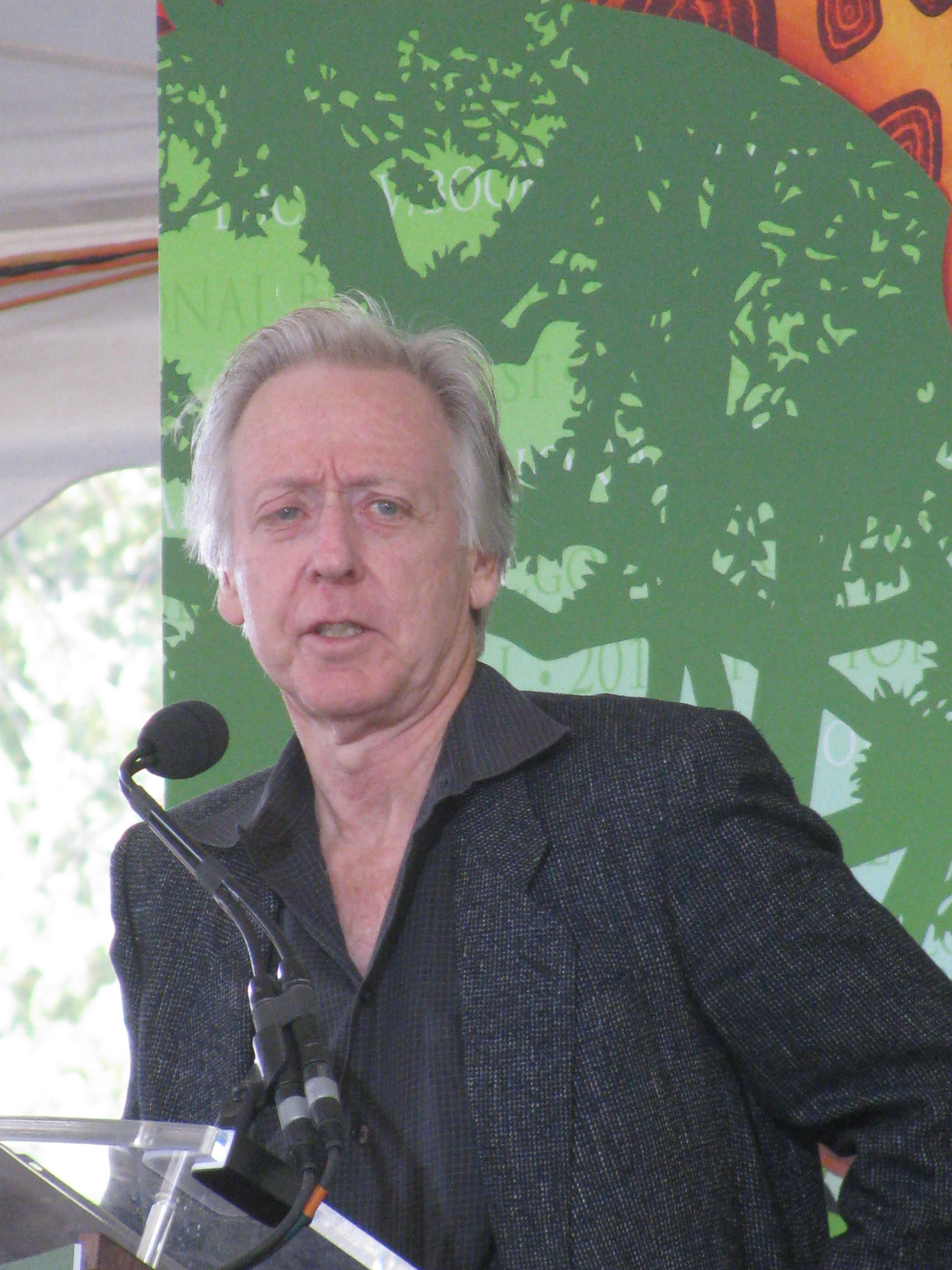
- Stewart at the 2012 National Book Festival
- Born: April 2, 1951 (age 75)
- Education: Yale University (BA, LLB)
- Occupations: Lawyer, author
- Spouse: Nancy Floreen
- Children: 3
- Website: davidostewart.com

David O. Stewart (born April 2, 1951) is an American author and attorney who writes both nonfiction historical narratives and historical fiction and lives in Potomac, Maryland. His historical works include George Washington: The Political Rise of America's Founding Father; Madison's Gift: Five Partnerships That Built America; American Emperor: Aaron Burr's Challenge to Jefferson's America; Impeached: The Trial of President Andrew Johnson and the Fight for Lincoln's Legacy; and The Summer of 1787: The Men Who Invented the Constitution. His novels include The New Land, The Lincoln Deception, The Wilson Deception, and The Babe Ruth Deception.

== Biography ==
Stewart grew up in Albany and Staten Island in New York, then graduated from Yale College in 1973. After covering the New York Legislature for the Staten Island Advance, he attended Yale Law School, graduating in 1978. Stewart was law clerk to Associate Justice Lewis F. Powell, Jr. of the United States Supreme Court during October Term, 1979, after working as law clerk for two appellate judges, J. Skelly Wright and David L. Bazelon of the U.S. Court of Appeals for the District of Columbia Circuit.

Following his clerkships, he practiced law with Miller, Cassidy, Larroca & Lewin in Washington, D.C., for nine years, concentrating on white-collar criminal defense, constitutional litigation, and appellate work, and then joined the Washington office of Ropes & Gray, LLP, in 1989 to begin a litigation group there. He handled jury trials and dozens of appeals and argued two cases before the U.S. Supreme Court. In 1989, he was principal defense counsel for U.S. District Judge Walter L. Nixon, Jr. of Biloxi, Mississippi, in an impeachment trial before the United States Senate.

For ten years, Stewart wrote the monthly "Supreme Court Report" for the American Bar Association Journal. He is married to former Montgomery County Council Member Nancy Floreen.

== Books ==
His first book, The Summer of 1787, examines the creation of the United States Constitution and grows out of his own experience as a constitutional lawyer. Stewart's experience in defending a Senate impeachment trial provided the spur to write about the first presidential impeachment in Impeached: The Trial of President Andrew Johnson and the Fight for Lincoln's Legacy (2009). In American Emperor: Aaron Burr's Challenge to Jefferson's America (2011), he explored another key legal battle in American history, the treason trial of former Vice President Aaron Burr for planning a private invasion of Spanish lands in North America and inviting the secession of America's Western territories. In February 2015, Simon & Schuster released Stewart's next nonfiction book, Madison's Gift: Five Partnerships that Built America. In 2021, he published George Washington: The Political Rise of America's Founding Father.

In September 2013, Kensington Books published his first novel, The Lincoln Deception, which explores the secrets of the John Wilkes Booth conspiracy. A sequel, The Wilson Deception, is set at the Paris Peace Conference of 1919, and was released in 2015. A third book in the series, The Babe Ruth Deception, was released in 2016, and covers Babe Ruth's first two years with the New York Yankees, 1920-21. In November 2021, Stewart released THE NEW LAND, which is Book 1 of a planned trilogy, The Overstreet Saga, which follows a family of German immigrants who land on the Maine coast in 1753. Book 2, The Burning Land was released in April 2023. His most recent nonfiction book is The Democracy We Must Keep: Seven Founders, Nine Documents, and the Ideas that Shaped America, which launched in late May 2026.

== Historiography ==
Stewart's books have shed new light on history and challenged previous views. Impeached, for example, counters the view, once best known from Profiles in Courage by John F. Kennedy and Theodore Sorensen, that the acquittal of Andrew Johnson was a triumph of bravery over politicking. Stewart has countered this view with evidence, some of which had come out in hearings under Representative Benjamin Butler soon after the acquittal, that senators had been led to vote to acquit by offers of patronage and money.

== Current activities ==
Stewart no longer practices law. In addition to writing books, he writes occasional short articles for publications such as Politico NPR, and Smithsonian. He has been interviewed numerous times on historical and impeachment-related topics.

His short story "When They Did It" appeared in New Millennium Writings (2004-2005).

Stewart is former president of the Washington Independent Review of Books, an online publication for new book reviews and related content. Since its launch in February 2011, The Independent has published more than 4,000 book reviews. He previously served on the Board of the Writer's Center in Bethesda, MD. His first book, The Summer of 1787, won the annual book award of Washington Independent Writers. His books have won prizes from the Society of the Cincinnati, New Jersey Chapter (twice), the National Society of Colonial Dames of America (the William H. Prescott Award), and the Colonial Dames of America. His George Washington biography was a finalist for the George Washington Prize for 2022 awarded by Mount Vernon and the Gilder Lehrman Institute of American History.

== Selected publications ==
- Stewart, David O. (April 1985). "Supreme Court Report". ABA Journal. 74 (1): 106–110. JSTOR 20757756.

== See also ==
- List of law clerks for the first seat of the Supreme Court of the United States
