= 2014 Maryland county executive elections =

- November 4, 2014

8 of Maryland's 9 county executive seats
	Majority party	Minority party
Party	Republican	Democratic
Last election	3	5
Seats won	5	4
Seat change	▲2	▼1
Popular vote	477,283	701,906
Percentage	40.30%	59.27%
Democratic
50–60%
60–70%
>90%
Republican
50–60%
60-70%
70-80%

The Maryland county executive elections of 2014 were held on November 4, 2014. Democratic and Republican primaries were held on June 24, 2014.

Anne Arundel County, Baltimore County, Frederick County, Harford County, Howard County, Montgomery County, Prince George's County, and Wicomico County elected county executives.

== Race summary ==
County	County executive	Party	First elected	Last race	Status	Candidates
Anne Arundel County	Laura Neuman	Republican	2013 (appointed)	50.4% R	Incumbent lost renomination. Republican hold.	▌Steve Schuh (Republican) 61.1%; ▌George F. Johnson IV (Democratic) 38.7%
Baltimore County	Kevin Kamenetz	Democratic	2010	53.7% D	Incumbent retired. Democratic hold.	▌Kevin Kamenetz (Democratic) 56.1%; ▌George Harman (Republican) 43.6%
Frederick County	None				New seat. Democratic gain.	▌Jan Gardner (Democratic) 53.8%; ▌Blaine Young (Republican) 45.8%
Harford County	David R. Craig	Republican	2006	79.3% R	Incumbent term-limited. Republican hold.	▌Barry Glassman (Republican) 74.8%; ▌Joe Werner (Democratic) 25.1%
Howard County	Ken Ulman	Democratic	2006	62.5% D	Incumbent term-limited. Republican gain.	▌Allan Kittleman (Republican) 51.2%; ▌Courtney Watson (Democratic) 48.7%
Montgomery County	Ike Leggett	Democratic	2006	65.6% D	Incumbent re-elected.	▌Ike Leggett (Democratic) 65.3%; ▌Jim Shalleck (Republican) 34.2%
Prince George's County	Rushern Baker	Democratic	2010	99.3% D	Incumbent re-elected.	▌Rushern Baker (Democratic) 98.8%
Wicomico County	Richard Pollitt	Democratic	2006	51.5% D	Incumbent lost re-election. Republican gain.	▌Bob Culver (Republican) 55.5%; ▌Richard Pollitt (Democratic) 44.4%

== Anne Arundel County ==
2014 Anne Arundel County executive election

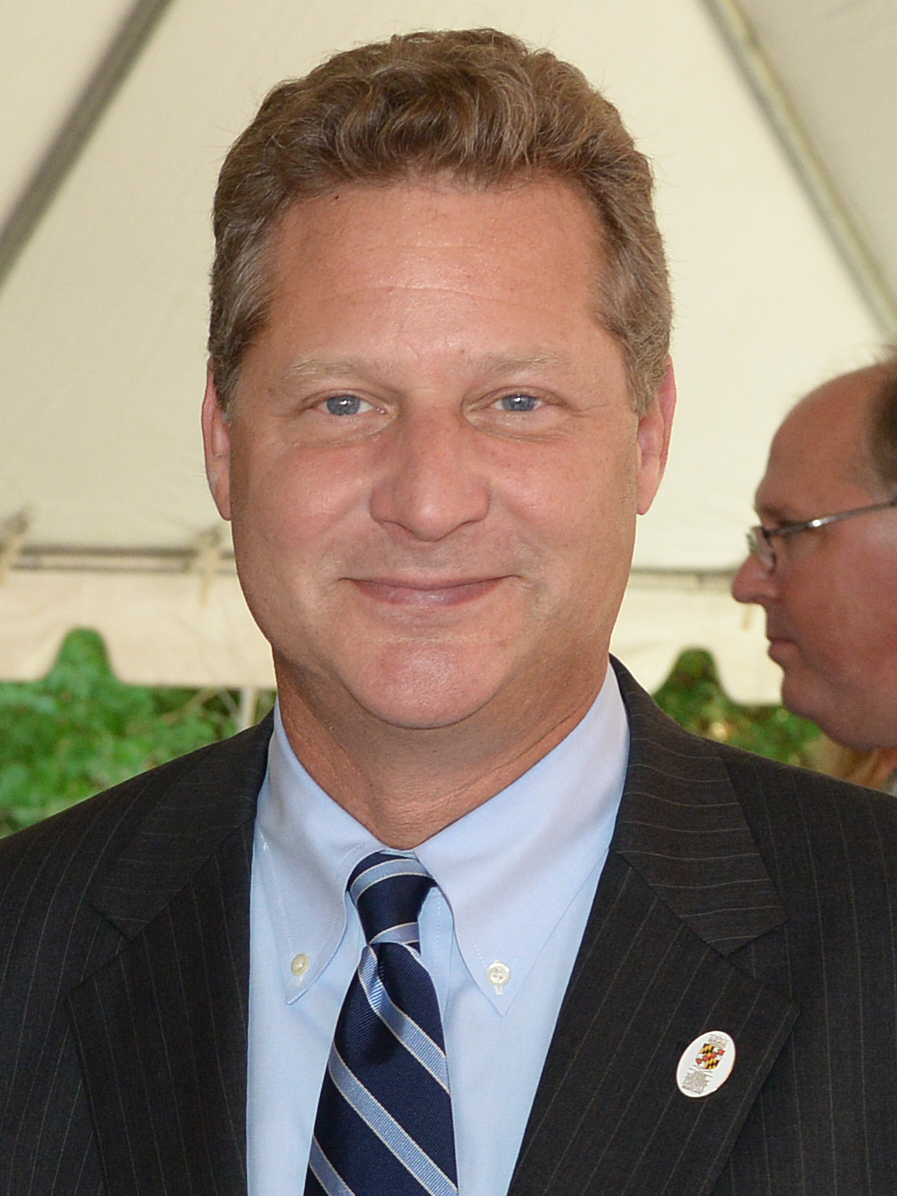

Nominee	Steve Schuh	George F. Johnson IV
Party	Republican	Democratic
Popular vote	107,952	68,379
Percentage	61.1%	38.7%
- Schuh: 50–60% 60–70% 70–80% 80–90% Johnson: 50–60% 60–70% 70–80%
County Executive before election
Laura Neuman
Republican
Elected County Executive
Steve Schuh
Republican

The incumbent executive was Republican Laura Neuman, who was named county executive following the suspension of John R. Leopold on January 29, 2013. She was seeking her first full term.

=== Republican primary ===
Steve Schuh – a state delegate from the 31st district since 2007 – was the Republican nominee. He defeated Neuman in the Republican primary.

Anne Arundel County Executive Republican primary election, 2014
Party	Candidate	Votes	%
Republican	Steve Schuh	17,563	54.3
Republican	Laura Neuman (incumbent)	14,776	45.7

=== Democratic primary ===
George F. Johnson IV – a former Anne Arundel County sheriff (1994–2006) and candidate for county executive in 2006 – was unopposed in the Democratic primary after Joanna Conti – a former Colorado congressional candidate, businesswoman, and nominee for county executive in 2010 – withdrew. He received 26,606 votes.

=== General election ===
Anne Arundel County Executive election, 2014
Party	Candidate	Votes	%
Republican	Steve Schuh	107,952	61.1
Democratic	George F. Johnson IV	68,379	38.7
Write-in		340	0.2
Republican hold			

== Baltimore County ==
2014 Baltimore County executive election

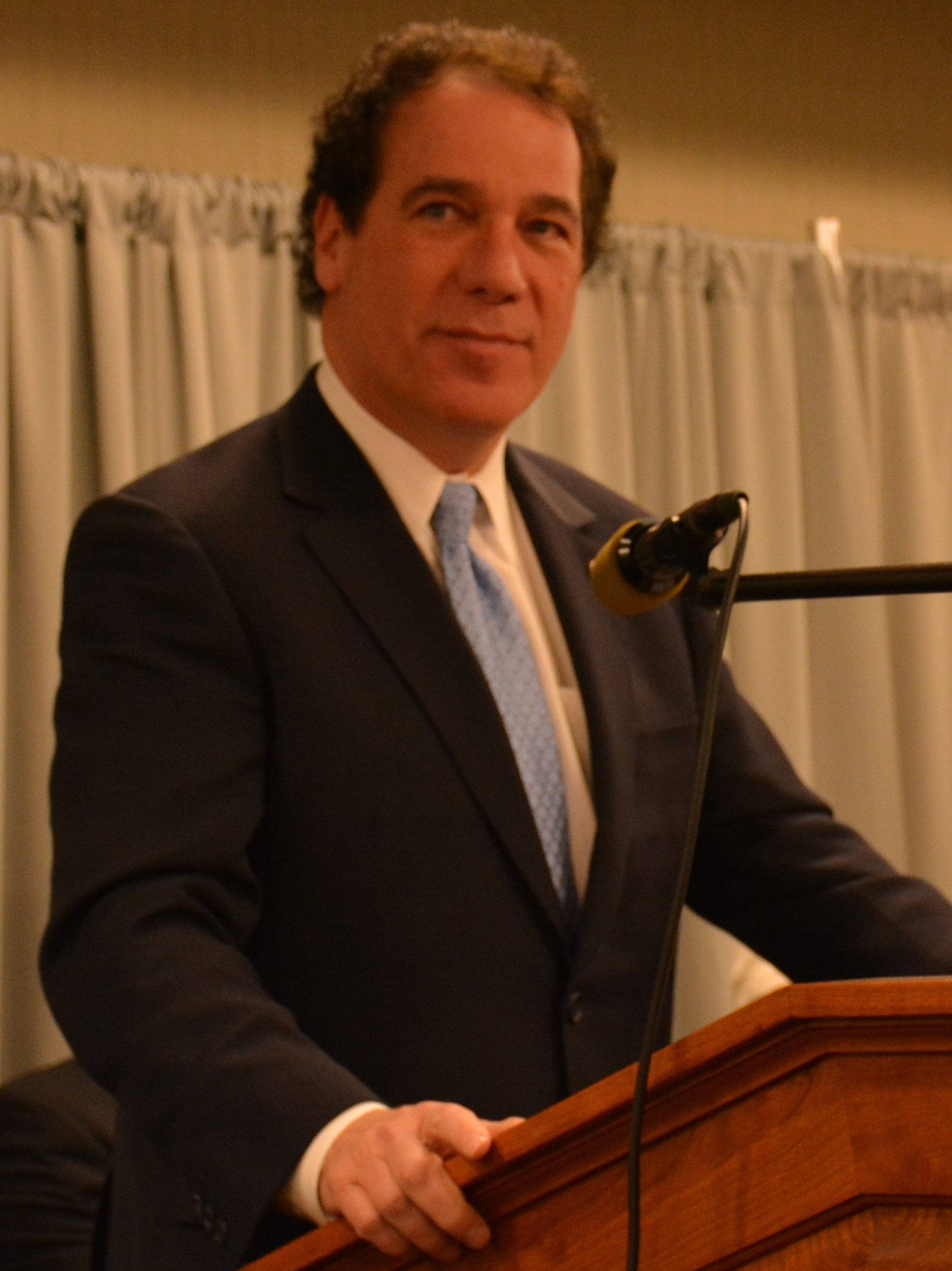

Nominee	Kevin Kamenetz	George Harman
Party	Democratic	Republican
Popular vote	143,904	111,853
Percentage	56.1%	43.6%
- Kamenetz: 50–60% 60–70% 70–80% 80–90% >90% Harman: 50–60% 60–70% 70–80%
County Executive before election
Kevin Kamenetz
Democratic
Elected County Executive
Kevin Kamenetz
Democratic

The incumbent executive was Democrat Kevin Kamenetz, who was elected in 2010 with 53.7% of the vote. He was eligible for re-election and ran for a second term.

=== Democratic primary ===
Kamenetz was the Democratic candidate. He defeated Kevin Francis Marron in the primary.

Baltimore County Executive Democratic primary election, 2014
Party	Candidate	Votes	%
Democratic	Kevin Kamenetz (incumbent)	56,136	75.1
Democratic	Kevin Francis Marron	18,590	24.9

=== Republican primary ===
==== Nominee ====
- George Harman, environmental consultant

==== Eliminated in primary ====
- Tony Campbell, Towson University professor
- Gregory Prush

==== Withdrawn ====
- Timothy Tenne

==== Results ====
Baltimore County Executive Republican primary election, 2014
Party	Candidate	Votes	%
Republican	George H. Harman	10,363	44.8
Republican	Tony Campbell	10,343	44.7
Republican	Gregory J. Prush	2,415	10.4

=== Independent candidates ===
Tony Solesky – a legal advocate – was an independent candidate in the election.

=== General election ===
Baltimore County Executive election, 2014
Party	Candidate	Votes	%
Democratic	Kevin Kamenetz (incumbent)	143,904	56.1
Republican	George H. Harman	111,853	43.6
Independent	Tony Solesky	213	0.1
Write-in		391	0.1
Democratic hold			

== Frederick County ==
2014 Frederick County executive election
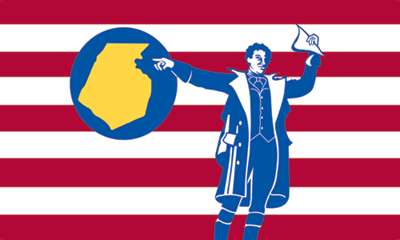

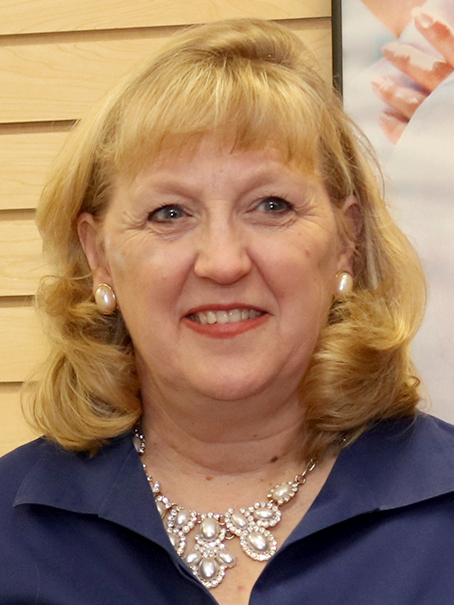

Nominee	Jan Gardner	Blaine Young
Party	Democratic	Republican
Popular vote	42,444	36,131
Percentage	53.8%	45.8%
- Gardner: 40–50% 50–60% 60–70% Young: 50–60% 60–70%
Elected County Executive
Jan Gardner
Democratic

On December 1, 2014, the Frederick County government transitioned to a "charter home rule government" following voters' approval of a ballot referendum for the transition during the 2012 elections. Therefore, there was no incumbent county executive.

=== Democratic primary ===
==== Nominee ====
Jan Gardner – a county commissioner since 1998 and county commission president from 2006 to 2010 – was unopposed in the Democratic primary. She received 11,706 votes.

=== Republican primary ===
==== Nominee ====
- Blaine Young, county commission president (2010–present) and former county commissioner (2010)

==== Eliminated in primary ====
- Mark Sweadner, former Frederick County budget officer
- David Gray, Frederick County Commissioner (1990–2002, 2006–present)

==== Results ====
Frederick County Executive Republican primary election, 2014
Party	Candidate	Votes	%
Republican	Blaine R. Young	10,260	53.2
Republican	David Gray	6,722	34.9
Republican	Mark W. Sweadner	2,298	11.9

=== General election ===
Frederick County Executive election, 2014
Party	Candidate	Votes	%
Democratic	Jan H. Gardner	42,444	53.8
Republican	Blaine R. Young	36,131	45.8
Write-in		283	0.4
Democratic win (new seat)			

== Harford County ==
2014 Harford County executive election

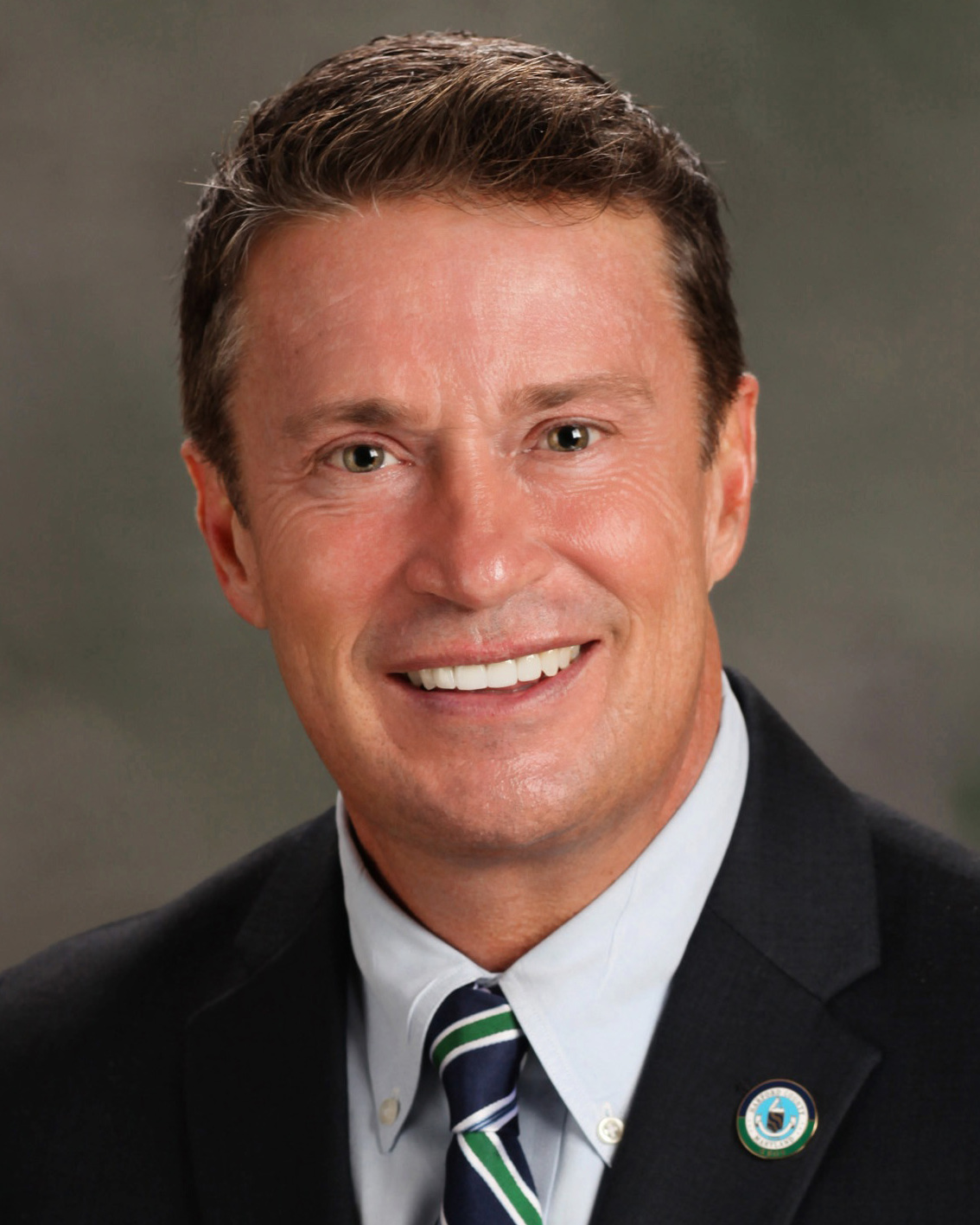

Nominee	Barry Glassman	Joseph Werner
Party	Republican	Democratic
Popular vote	66,595	22,387
Percentage	74.8%	25.1%
- Glassman: 50–60% 60–70% 70–80% 80–90% Werner: 50–60% 60–70% Tie: 50%
County Executive before election
David R. Craig
Republican
Elected County Executive
Barry Glassman
Republican

The incumbent executive was Republican David R. Craig, who was re-elected in 2010 with 79.3% of the vote. He was term-limited and could not run for re-election to a third term.

=== Republican primary ===
Barry Glassman – a state senator from the 35th district since 2008 and former state delegate from district 35A from 1999 to 2008 – was unopposed in the Republican primary. He received 15,063 votes.

=== Democratic primary ===
==== Nominee ====
Joe Werner – a perennial candidate – was unopposed in the Democratic primary. He received 10,564 votes.

=== General election ===
Harford County Executive election, 2014
Party	Candidate	Votes	%
Republican	Barry Glassman	66,595	74.8
Democratic	Joseph Werner	22,387	25.1
Write-in		92	0.1
Republican hold			

== Howard County ==
2014 Howard County executive election

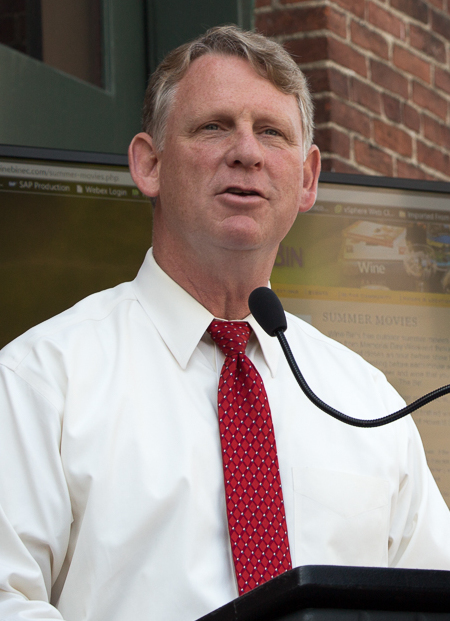

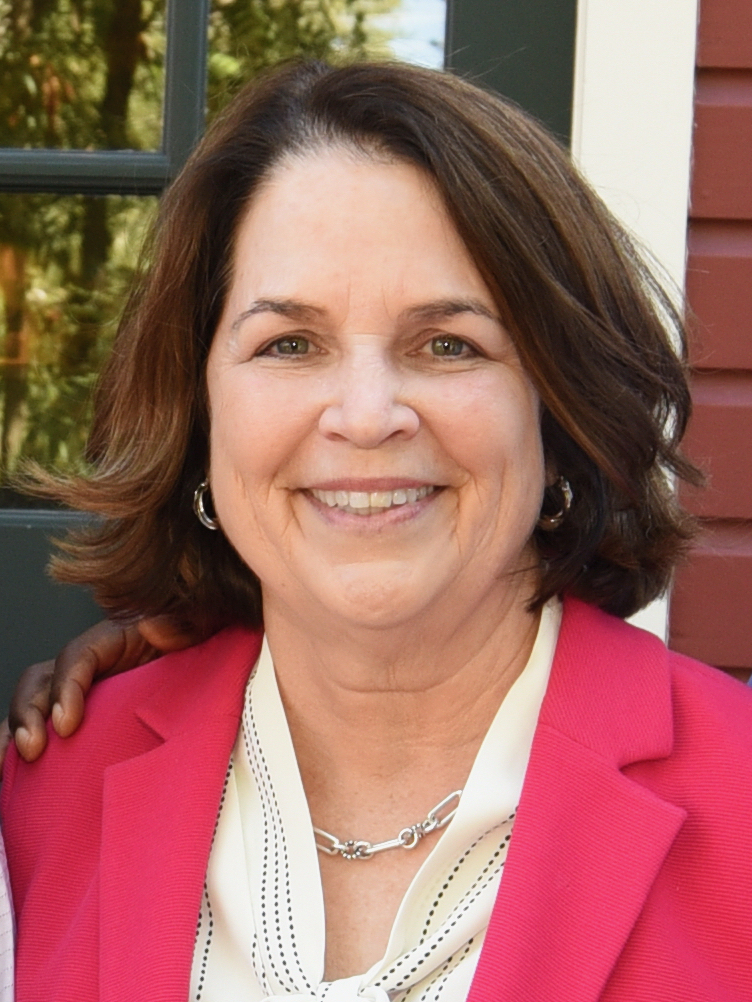
Nominee	Allan Kittleman	Courtney Watson
Party	Republican	Democratic
Popular vote	53,207	50,543
Percentage	51.2%	48.7%
- Precinct results Kittleman: 50–60% 60–70% 70–80% 80–90% Watson: 50–60% 60–70% 70–80% Tie: 50%
County Executive before election
Ken Ulman
Democratic
Elected County Executive
Allan Kittleman
Republican

The incumbent County Executive was Democrat Kenneth Ulman, who was re-elected in 2010 with 62.5% of the vote. He was term-limited and could not run for re-election to a third term.

=== Democratic primary ===
==== Nominee ====
Courtney Watson – a Howard County Councilmember since 2006 – was unopposed in the Democratic primary. She received 21,469 votes.

=== Republican primary ===
Allan H. Kittleman – a state senator from the 9th district since 2004 – was unopposed in the Republican primary. He received 9,301 votes.

=== General election ===
Howard County Executive election, 2014
Party	Candidate	Votes	%
Republican	Allan H. Kittleman	53,207	51.2
Democratic	Courtney Watson	50,543	48.7
Write-in		101	0.1
Republican gain from Democratic			

== Montgomery County ==
2014 Montgomery County executive election

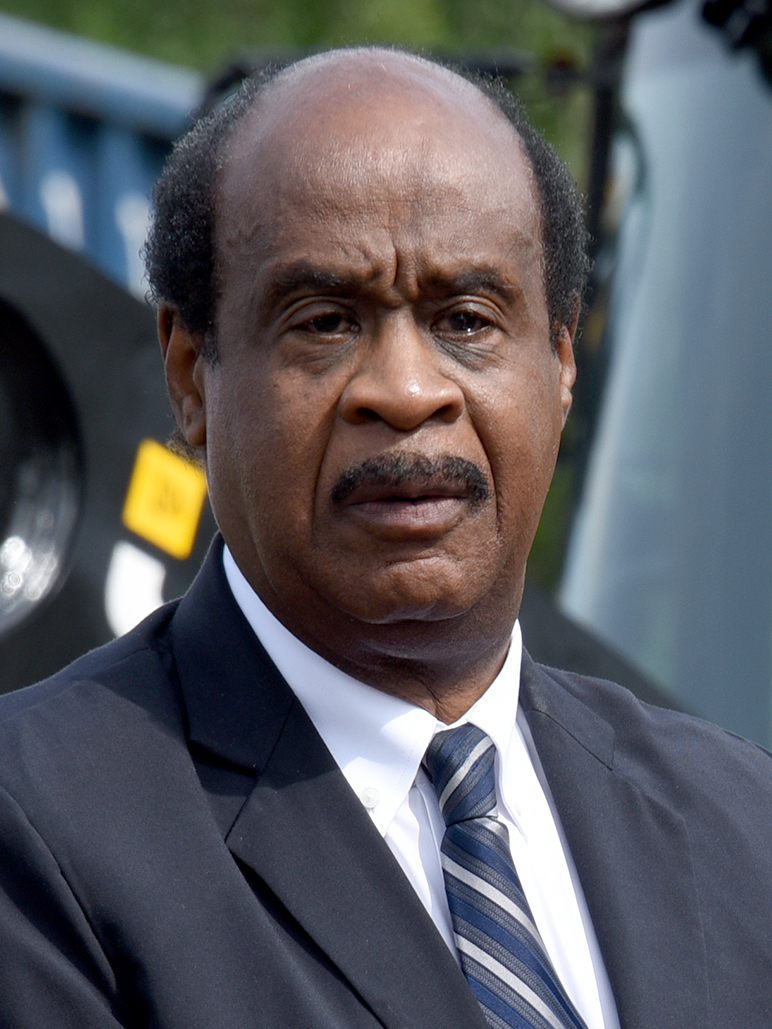

Nominee	Ike Leggett	Jim Shalleck
Party	Democratic	Republican
Popular vote	167,052	87,361
Percentage	65.3%	34.2%
- Leggett: 50–60% 60–70% 70–80% 80–90% >90% Shalleck: 50–60% 60–70% 70–80%
County Executive before election
Ike Leggett
Democratic
Elected County Executive
Ike Leggett
Democratic

The incumbent executive was Democrat Ike Leggett, who was re-elected in 2010 with 65.6% of the vote. He ran for a third term.

=== Democratic primary ===
==== Nominee ====
- Leggett, incumbent county executive (2006–present)

==== Eliminated in primary ====
- Doug Duncan, former Montgomery County executive (1994–2006) and candidate for governor in 2006
- Phil Andrews, Montgomery County councilmember (1998–present)

==== Results ====
Montgomery County Executive Democratic primary election, 2014
Party	Candidate	Votes	%
Democratic	Ike Leggett (incumbent)	40,122	45.6
Democratic	Doug Duncan	28,296	32.2
Democratic	Phil Andrews	19,589	22.3

=== Republican primary ===
Jim Shalleck – who was a candidate for Montgomery County State's Attorney in 2006 – was unopposed. He received 12,008 votes.

=== General election ===
Montgomery County Executive election, 2014
Party	Candidate	Votes	%
Democratic	Ike Leggett (incumbent)	167,052	65.3
Republican	Jim Shalleck	87,361	34.2
Write-in		1,273	0.5
Democratic hold			

== Prince George's County ==
2014 Prince George's County executive election

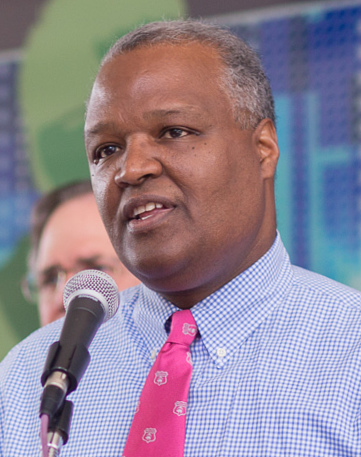
Nominee	Rushern Baker
Party	Democratic
Popular vote	195,849
Percentage	98.8%
County Executive before election
Rushern Baker
Democratic
Elected County Executive
Rushern Baker
Democratic

The incumbent County Executive was Democrat Rushern Baker, who was elected in 2010 with 99.3% of the vote. He was eligible for re-election and ran for a second term.

=== Democratic primary ===
Baker was unopposed in the Democratic primary. He received 77,546 votes.

=== General election ===
Prince George's County Executive election, 2014
Party	Candidate	Votes	%
Democratic	Rushern Baker (incumbent)	195,849	98.8
Write-in		2,293	1.1
Democratic hold			

== Wicomico County ==
2014 Wicomico County executive election
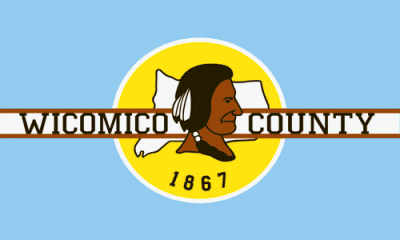

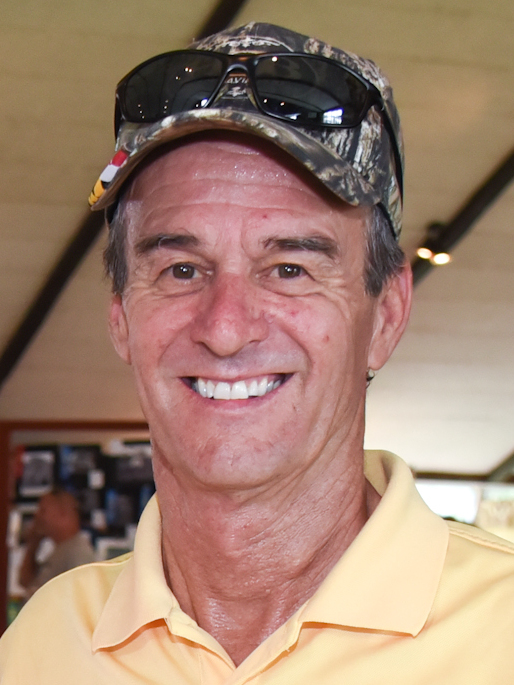

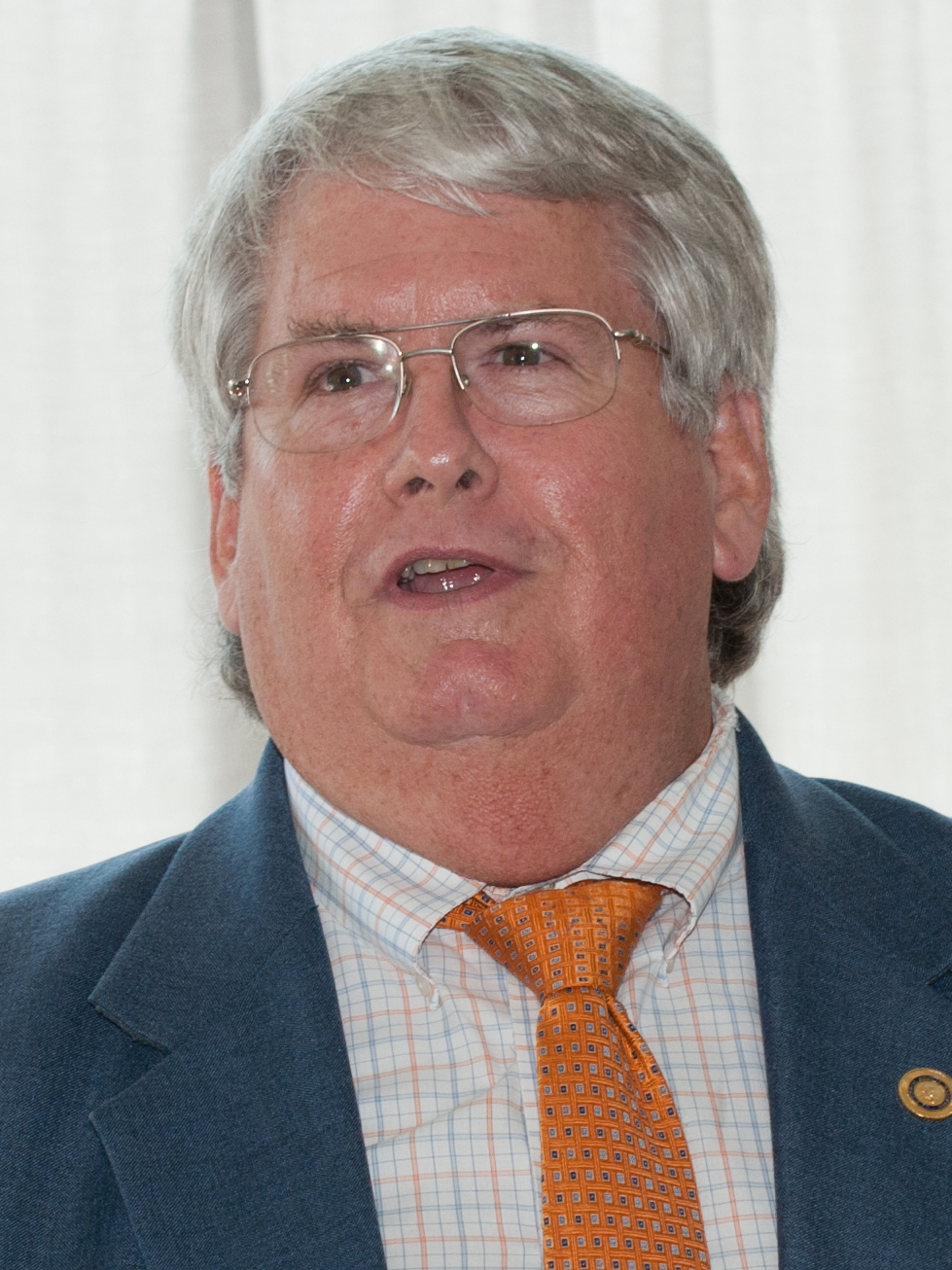
Nominee	Bob Culver	Richard Pollitt
Party	Republican	Democratic
Popular vote	14,184	11,348
Percentage	55.5%	44.4%
- Culver: 50–60% 60–70% 70–80% 80–90% Pollitt: 50–60% 60–70% 80–90% >90%
County Executive before election
Richard Pollitt
Democratic
Elected County Executive
Bob Culver
Republican

The incumbent executive was Democrat Richard Pollitt, who was re-elected in 2010 with 51.5% of the vote. He was eligible for re-election and ran for a third term.

=== Democratic primary ===
Pollitt was unopposed in the Democratic primary. He received 3,573 votes.

=== Republican primary ===
Bob Culver – a Wicomico County councilmember since 2010 – was unopposed in the Republican primary. He received 3,976 votes.

=== General election ===
Wicomico County Executive election, 2014
Party	Candidate	Votes	%
Republican	Bob Culver	14,184	55.5
Democratic	Richard M. Pollitt Jr. (incumbent)	11,348	44.4
Write-in		21	0.1
Republican gain from Democratic			
