= Washington Independent Review of Books =

American volunteer organization (founded 2011)

- Founded: 2011
- Founded at: Washington DC
- Locations: Washington, DC, United States; Frederick, Maryland, United States
- President: Salley Shannon
- Key people: Past president: David O. Stewart
- Website: www.washingtonindependentreviewofbooks.com

The Washington Independent Review of Books is a volunteer organization that operates a website for book reviews. It was founded by a group of writers in the Washington, D.C., area.
