= Phil Andrews (politician) =

Maryland politician

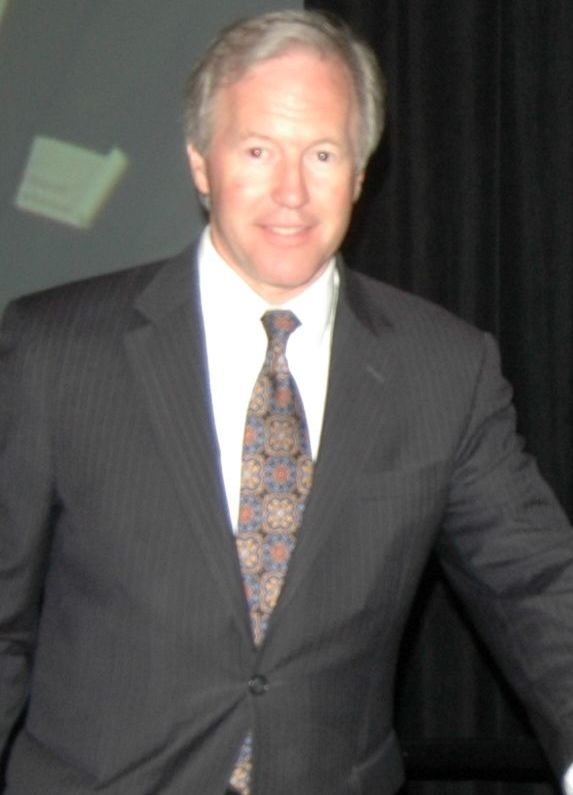
Andrews in 2014

Phil Andrews is the former Director of Crime Prevention Initiatives for the State's Attorney's Office of Montgomery County, Maryland. From 1998-2014, he served for four terms on the Montgomery County Council. Andrews was born in Washington, D.C., and grew up in Montgomery County, MD. He graduated from Einstein High School in Kensington, and earned a bachelor's degree in political science from Bucknell University in 1981 and a master's degree in governmental administration from the University of Pennsylvania in 1992 (Fels Institute of Government).

== Recent career ==
In December 2014, Montgomery County State's Attorney John McCarthy hired Andrews to develop and implement crime prevention initiatives, beginning with the establishment of mental health courts, and to strengthen community outreach. In 2015, he was appointed by Circuit Court Administrative Judge John Debelius to chair the Montgomery County Mental Health Court Planning and Implementation Task Force. In January 2016, the Task Force released a report unanimously recommending the establishment of Mental Health Courts in the Montgomery County Circuit Court and the Maryland District Court for Montgomery County by the Court's respective administrative judges to divert people who commit low-level crimes because of a mental illness into treatment and services and away from prosecution and jail. In December 2016, the Montgomery County Circuit Court's Mental Health Court began operating, and the District Court's Mental Health Court began in January 2017. In 2017, Andrews was part of a team awarded the Wayne Fenton Memorial Award by the Montgomery County chapter of the National Alliance on Mental Illness for his leadership in establishing the county's mental health courts.

Andrews also has helped lead efforts that established a more pro-active strategy to reduce gang-related violence and recruitment in Montgomery County. He helped secure an AmeriCorps member from Volunteer Maryland that resulted in development of a volunteer program to bolster the State's Attorney's Truancy Prevention Program by building volunteer capacity, and serves as the Truancy Prevention Program facilitator at several MCPS middle schools. In addition, he has led efforts that have expanded the Office's educational programs to students and parents on internet safety and cyberbullying to prevent crime and victimization.

== County Council career ==
Prior to serving in his current position, Andrews was elected to represent the residents of District 3 on the Montgomery County Council in November 1998, defeating a 16-year incumbent in the Democratic Primary, the only challenger to defeat an incumbent district council member in a primary since district elections were established in 1990. He was re-elected in 2002, 2006 and 2010, never losing a precinct in the general elections; in 2010, he became the only council candidate ever to run unopposed in both the primary and general elections. In 2008-09, during the height of the Great Recession, Andrews was elected by his colleagues as Council President, where he led efforts that protected emergency and essential services and that balanced a very difficult budget without raising taxes or laying off employees. Andrews chaired the Council's Public Safety Committee for fourteen years, chaired the County's Domestic Violence Coordinating Council, and chaired the region's Emergency Preparedness Council of the Washington Metropolitan Council of Governments (COG). In the latter position, he also chaired the regional task force which developed recommendations, since implemented, that have improved the region's emergency preparedness and response.

As a council member, Andrews was the chief sponsor of a number of landmark County laws, including the Public Financing of Elections Law (2014), the Smoke-free Restaurants Law (2003), the Living Wage Law (2002), and two laws expanding employment opportunities for people with disabilities (2010 and 2012). He authored and championed the law reforming an abused police disability retirement system (2009), saving taxpayers millions of dollars annually. He also was chief sponsor of the 2010 law that eliminated the use of "ghost COLAs" in calculating pensions, saving taxpayers $280 million over 40 years, and of the 2007 law that requires real estate agents to provide prospective homebuyers an accurate estimate of what their property tax bill would be in the first year of ownership. In addition, Andrews was the lead sponsor of the Winter Pedestrian Safety Act (2001), which requires that property owners make sidewalks safely passable within 24 hours after a snowfall, and of the nation's first local law prohibiting genetic discrimination in employment (2000). In 2010, he helped lead the countywide effort that resulted in voter rejection of ambulance fees at referendum, and was instrumental in defeating a 2011 bill to establish a permanent county-wide youth curfew. Andrews has been one of the state's leading advocates for reforming congressional redistricting to end gerrymandering, and to advance public financing of campaigns. During his 16 years on the County Council, Andrews never missed a Council session, and never accepted campaign funds from political action committees (PACs) and county developers.

== Early career ==
Andrews was hired as the executive director of Common Cause of Maryland in 1988 and served until 1994. During his tenure, he led the statewide campaign that resulted in General Assembly passage of the first limits on political action committee (PAC) contributions in Maryland state and county elections, the enactment of the law prohibiting registered lobbyists from fundraising for members of the General Assembly, and prohibiting legislators from accepting honoraria for speeches and articles. After stepping down from that post, he served from 1994-98 as the first managing director of Montgomery County's AmeriCorps program, Community Assisting Police, one of the nation's first public safety AmeriCorps programs. In 1997, the program received the Governor's Award for Victim Assistance. From 1996-97, Andrews served as a member of the Board of Appeals of the City of Gaithersburg.

== Awards and recognitions ==
Andrews received many awards for his work on the County Council. He was honored in 2013 by The Arc Maryland and by The Arc Montgomery as "Advocate of the Year" for his work expanding County employment opportunities for people with disabilities, and by the American Lung Association of Maryland in 2004 with its "Distinguished Public Service Award" for his leadership in bringing smoke-free restaurants (the state and region's first such law) to Montgomery County. He also was recognized in 2001 by the Montgomery County chapter of the Sierra Club with its Green Bugle Award, in 2015 by the League of Women Voters of Montgomery County with its Lavinia Award for his leadership for public financing of elections and against gerrymandering and by The Sentinel newspapers in 2014 as its "Excellence in Government Honoree of the Year." In recognition of his work that strengthened the volunteer fire and rescue service and the volunteer fire departments, he was inducted into the Montgomery County Volunteer Fire and Rescue Hall of Fame in 2008, and received the "Hiram Musgrove Award" from the Bethesda-Chevy Chase Rescue Squad (also in 2008), its highest award. Time magazine described Andrews as "the Living Wage Bill's champion on the County Council" and the Washington Post lauded him for his effectiveness and civility, and as "the conscience" of the Council. When he ran for County Executive in 2014, he was endorsed by The Gazette, Montgomery County's largest newspaper, primarily for his record and focus on fiscal responsibility.
