= Frederick County Council and County Executive =

Government of Frederick County, Maryland

The Frederick County Council and Frederick County Executive are, respectively, the elected representatives of the legislative and executive branches of the county government of Frederick County, Maryland, United States. Offices are located in Winchester Hall in the county seat, Frederick.

== Formation ==
Until 2014, Frederick County was governed by county commissioners. On December 1, 2014, Frederick County transitioned to a "charter home rule government". The voters approved this governmental change in the November 6, 2012 election, with 62,469 voting for the transition and 37,368 voting against.

== County executive ==
A county executive is responsible for providing direction, supervision, and administrative oversight of all executive departments, agencies, and offices.

Jan H. Gardner was elected the first Frederick County executive in 2014. She was reelected in 2018.

== County council ==
A county council has seven members: five based on district and two at-large. The members of the Frederick County Council are as follows.

County council
Name	Affiliation	District	Region	First elected
Renee Knapp	Democrat	At-large	At-large	2022
Brad W. Young	Democrat	At-large	At-large	2022
Jerry Donald	Democrat	1	Braddock Heights, Middletown, Brunswick	2014
Steve McKay	Republican	2	Monrovia, Urbana, New Market, Mount Airy	2018
M.C. Keegan-Ayer	Democrat	3	Frederick, Clover Hill	2014
Kavonte Duckett	Democrat	4	Frederick, Ballenger Creek, Linganore	2022
Mason Carter	Republican	5	Myersville, Emmitsburg, Thurmont	2022

== See also ==
- Maryland county executive elections, 2018
