= 2026 Maryland elections =

- November 3, 2026

The 2026 Maryland elections were held in the state of Maryland on November 3, 2026, alongside the nationwide midterm elections. Elections was held for governor as well as all 8 of the state's U.S. House of Representatives seats, most statewide offices, eight county executives, all 141 seats in the Maryland House of Delegates, all 47 seats in the Maryland Senate, and other state and local elections. Three ballot measures are scheduled to be on the ballot. Primary elections were held on June 23, 2026.

Maryland is generally considered to be one of the bluest states in the United States, consistently supporting Democrats statewide by wide margins for the past three decades. In the 2022 election cycle, Democrats expanded their supermajorities in both chambers of the state legislature and flipped the governorship. The state has not voted for a Republican for president since 1988, when George H.W. Bush swept most of the nation. Democrats have controlled both of Maryland's United States Senate seats since 1986. Maryland gave Kamala Harris her third strongest margin of victory across the country in 2024, behind Vermont and the District of Columbia. Democrats filed for all seats in the Maryland General Assembly for the first time since 1974.

== United States House of Representatives ==
All of Maryland's 8 seats in the United States House of Representatives are up for election in 2026. United States representatives serve two year terms.

Following the 2024 elections, 7 seats are held by Democrats, and one seat is held by a Republican, Andy Harris.

== State executive ==
=== Governor ===
Incumbent Democratic governor Wes Moore was first elected in 2022 with 64.5% of the vote. He is running for re-election.

Nine candidates ran in the Republican primary for governor, with media outlets describing former state delegate Dan Cox and Baltimore Blast owner Ed Hale the frontrunners of the race. Other candidates included firearms instructor Carl Brunner, 2024 U.S. Senate candidate John Myrick, and 2024 Baltimore mayoral candidate Shannon Wright. Cox defeated Hale in the Republican primary election with 43.3 percent of the vote and will face Moore in the general election.

=== Attorney General ===
Incumbent Democratic attorney general Anthony Brown was first elected in 2022 with 65.0% of the vote. He is running for re-election.

=== Comptroller ===
Incumbent Democratic comptroller Brooke Lierman was first elected in 2022 with 61.6% of the vote. She is running for re-election.

== State legislature ==
All 47 seats in the Maryland Senate and 141 seats in the Maryland House of Delegates are up for election in 2026. State senators and delegates serve four year terms.

Following the 2022 elections, Democrats expanded their supermajority in the State Senate to 34 seats and in the House of Delegates to 102 seats. Republicans hold 13 seats in the State Senate and 39 seats in the House of Delegates.

=== State senate ===
Party	Before	After	Change
Democratic	34	35	▲1
Republican	13	12	▼1
Total	47	47	

=== House of Delegates ===
Party	Before	After	Change
Democratic	102	106	▲4
Republican	39	35	▼4
Total	141	141	

== Local elections ==
Elections for county executives in eight of Maryland's 23 counties and numerous local elections will also take place in 2026. County executive elections will be held in Anne Arundel, Baltimore, Frederick, Harford, Howard, Montgomery, Prince George's, and Wicomico counties.

== Ballot measures ==
Maryland 2026 ballot measures
Proposition	Description
Question 1	Establishes a neutral arbitration framework for collective bargaining for state employees.
Question 2	Allows for temporary appointments to the Maryland Commission on Judicial Disabilities when a member is recused, disqualified, or their term ends.
Question 3	Exempts Maryland's congressional districts from redistricting guidelines in the Constitution of Maryland.
