= 2026 Maryland gubernatorial election =

- November 3, 2026
- Reporting: 98% as of 11:30AM EST

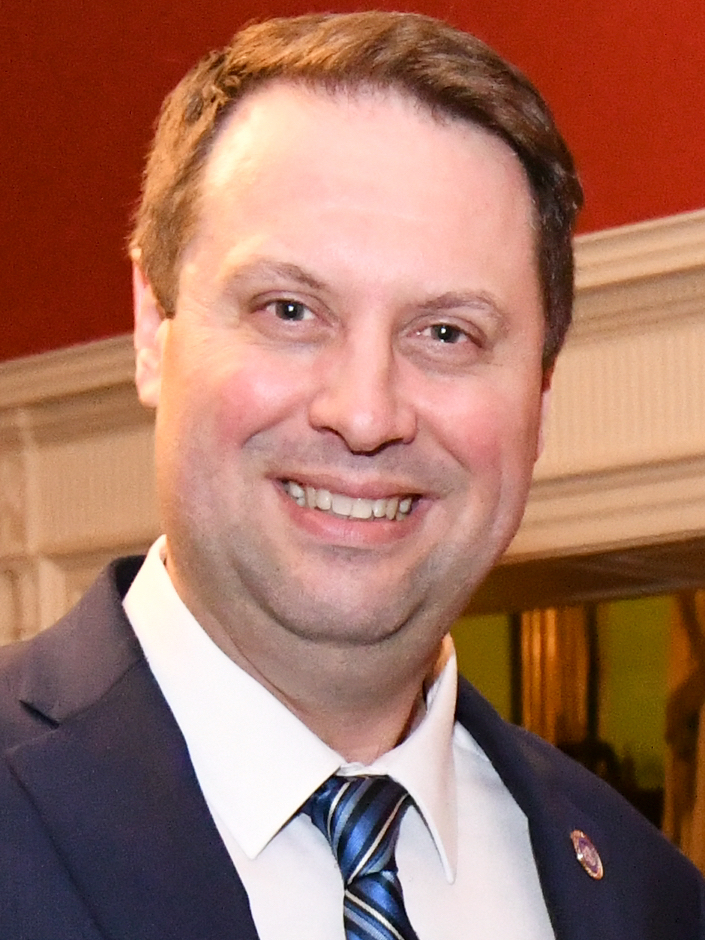
Nominee	Wes Moore	Dan Cox
Party	Democratic	Republican
Running mate	Aruna Miller	Robert Krop
Popular vote	1,470,907	683,658
Percentage	65.3%	30.3%
- Moore: 50–60% 60–70% 70–80% 80–90% Cox: 40–50% 50–60% 60–70% 70–80%
Governor before election
Wes Moore
Democratic
Elected Governor
Wes Moore
Democratic

The 2026 Maryland gubernatorial election took place on November 3, 2026, to elect the governor of Maryland. The primary elections took place on June 23, 2026. Incumbent Democratic governor Wes Moore was re-elected to a second term, defeating his 2022 opponent Dan Cox. This is the first gubernatorial rematch in Maryland since 2010. Moore is scheduled to serve a four-year term beginning on January 20, 2027.

== Background ==
At the federal and state level, Maryland is a solid blue state and one of the most consistently Democratic states in the nation, with Kamala Harris carrying it by 29 points in the 2024 presidential election. Elections in Maryland are dominated by the Baltimore metropolitan area and the D.C. suburbs. Going into this election, Democrats occupied all statewide offices and held supermajorities in both houses of the state legislature, as well as all but one seat in the state's congressional delegation.

== Democratic primary ==
=== Campaign ===
Moore has maintained positive approval ratings throughout his first term, though his numbers have steadily declined. Mileah Kromer, the director of the University of Maryland, Baltimore County's Institute of Politics, has associated the downward trend in Moore's approval rating with voter frustration over affordability issues and a distrust of local, state, and federal government. An incumbent Democratic governor has not lost re-election in Maryland since 1950, when William Preston Lane Jr. failed to win a second term.

Moore faced token opposition in the Democratic primary.

=== Candidates ===
==== Nominee ====
- Wes Moore, incumbent governor (2023–present)
  - Running mate: Aruna Miller, incumbent lieutenant governor (2023–present)

==== Eliminated in primary ====
- Eric Felber, physician and candidate for Maryland's 8th congressional district in 2024
  - Running mate: LaTrece Hawkins Lytes, community activist and candidate for lieutenant governor in 2022

==== Withdrew ====
- Ed Hale, retired banker and owner of the Baltimore Blast (ran as a Republican)
- Ralph Jaffe, perennial candidate (died February 6, 2026)
  - Running mate: Donald Palmore, pastor

=== Endorsements ===
Eric Felber

Organizations

- Vote Common Good
Wes Moore

U.S. senators

- Angela Alsobrooks, Maryland (2025–present)
- Chris Van Hollen, Maryland (2017–present)

U.S. representatives

- April McClain Delaney, MD-06 (2025–present)

Statewide officials

- Ed Rothstein, secretary of the Maryland Department of Veterans and Military Families (2025–2026) (Republican)

State legislators

- Carl Anderton Jr., former state delegate from district 38B (2015–2024) (Republican)

Local officials

- Calvin Ball III, Howard County executive (2018–2026)
- Aisha Braveboy, Prince George's County executive (2025–present)
- Sharon Green Middleton, vice chair of the Baltimore City Council (2016–present) from the 6th district (2007–present)
- Steuart Pittman, Anne Arundel County executive (2018–present) and chair of the Maryland Democratic Party (2025–present)
- Brandon Scott, mayor of Baltimore (2020–present)

Labor unions

- American Federation of Government Employees
- Maryland International Association of Fire Fighters
- Maryland State Education Association
- Service Employees International Union Local 500

Organizations

- Black Economic Alliance PAC
- CASA in Action
- Collective PAC
- End Citizens United
- Jewish Democratic Council of America
- Maryland League of Conservation Voters
- Moms Demand Action
- VoteVets

Newspapers

- Baltimore Afro-American

=== Fundraising ===
Campaign finance reports as of June 7, 2026
Candidate	Raised	Spent	Cash on hand
Wes Moore (D)	$13,795,120	$9,581,961	$6,519,690
Source: Maryland State Board of Elections

=== Results ===
Results by county Moore: 70–80%; 80–90%; >90%

Results by precinct Moore: 50–60%; 60–70%; 70–80%; 80–90%; >90%; Felber: 50–60%; 60–70%; 70–80%; >90%; Tie No data/No votes

Democratic primary results
Party	Candidate	Votes	%
Democratic	Wes Moore (incumbent); Aruna Miller (incumbent)	558,768	88.3
Democratic	Eric Felber; LaTrece Hawkins Lytes	74,312	11.7
Total votes		633,080	100.0

== Republican primary ==
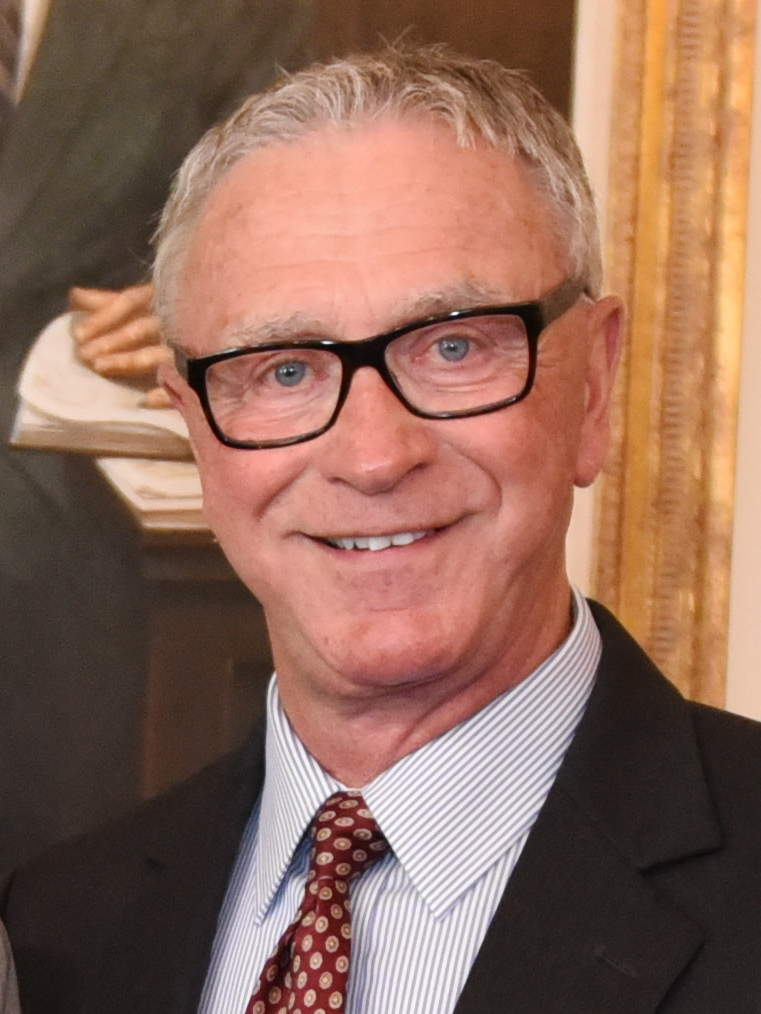
Businessman Ed Hale finished second in the primary.

=== Campaign ===
During the Republican primary, candidates campaigned against Moore's handling of economic issues, especially toward tax reforms and increases to vehicle registration fees in the state during his first term.

Much of the speculation as to which Republicans may challenge Moore in the 2026 election revolved around former governor Larry Hogan. Hogan's entry would have given Republicans a high-profile candidate, potentially making the race more competitive. However, he announced in an op-ed to The Baltimore Sun in January 2026 that he would not run for a third term as governor in 2026, after which speculation turned to Steve Hershey, the minority leader of the Maryland Senate who had formed an exploratory committee into a potential gubernatorial campaign. Hershey filed to run for re-election in February 2026, leaving the Republican Party without a formidable opponent against Moore.

Republican challengers to Moore face an uphill battle against him, especially as public frustration with President Donald Trump continues to boost Democratic officeholders in deep blue states. As of May 2026, Republican candidates in the race have struggled to raise funds for their campaigns, lack experience in running a statewide campaign, and hold positions in line with Trump. Media outlets described Cox and Hale as the frontrunners of the Republican primary.

As the primaries approached, some of the Maryland Republican Party's establishment appeared to begin coalescing around Hale, believing him to be more electable than Cox. However, Cox still enjoyed name recognition from his previous gubernatorial campaign as well as solid voter bases in Trump-leaning regions of the state. In June 2026, the Maryland Democratic Party and Governor Moore began airing advertisements and sending out mailers promoting Cox over Hale. Cox won the Republican primary on June 23, 2026, defeating Hale.

=== Candidates ===
==== Nominee ====
- Dan Cox, former state delegate from the 4th district (2019–2023), nominee for Maryland's 8th congressional district in 2016, nominee for governor in 2022, and candidate for Maryland's 6th congressional district in 2024
  - Running mate: Robert Krop, gun store owner

==== Eliminated in primary ====
- Carl Brunner, firearms instructor
  - Running mate: Kevin Rhodes, sales executive
- L. D. Burkindine, sheet metal business owner
  - Running mate: Jeremy Shifflett, rental community manager
- Ed Hale, retired banker and owner of the Baltimore Blast (previously ran as a Democrat)
  - Running mate: Tyrone Keys, financial services professional
- Douglas Larcomb, former business owner
  - Running mate: Martina Duncan, massage therapist
- John Myrick, federal executive consultant and candidate for U.S. Senate in 2024
  - Running mate: Brenda Thiam, former state delegate from district 2B (2020–2023) and candidate for Maryland's 6th congressional district in 2024
- Michael Oakes, retired business owner
  - Running mate: Ronald Abend
- Shannon Wright, nonprofit executive, pastor, and nominee for mayor of Baltimore in 2020 and 2024
  - Running mate: Reba Hawkins, business owner and candidate for Maryland's 3rd congressional district in 2020 and U.S. Senate in 2022

==== Deceased ====
- Nancy Taylor, bank teller (died May 25, 2026, remained on ballot)
  - Running mate: Rachel "Mohawk" Swift

==== Disqualified ====
- Kurt Wedekind, farmer
  - Running mate: Shannon Wright, nonprofit executive, pastor, and nominee for mayor of Baltimore in 2020 and 2024 (running for governor)

==== Withdrew ====
- Christopher Eric Bouchat, state delegate from the 5th district (2023–present)

==== Declined ====
- Andy Harris, U.S. representative from Maryland's 1st congressional district (2011–present) (running for re-election)
- Steve Hershey, minority leader of the Maryland Senate (2023–present) from the 36th district (2013–present) (running for re-election)
- Larry Hogan, former governor (2015–2023) and nominee for U.S. Senate in 2024

=== Endorsements ===
Dan Cox

Organizations

- Maryland Right to Life
Ed Hale

Statewide officials

- James F. Ports Jr., former Maryland Secretary of Transportation (2022–2023)

State legislators

- Jack Bailey, state senator from the 29th district (2019–present)
- J. B. Jennings, state senator from the 7th district (2011–present)
- Nic Kipke, state delegate from the 31st district (2007–present)
- Ryan Nawrocki, state delegate from district 7A (2011–present)
- Justin Ready, state senator from the 5th district (2015–present)
- Johnny Ray Salling, state senator from the 6th district (2015–present)
- Kathy Szeliga, state delegate from district 7A (2011–present)
Declined to endorse

Organizations

- Maryland Republican Party

=== Debates and forums ===
2026 Maryland Republican gubernatorial primary debates
No.	Date	Host	Moderator	Link	Participants				
P Participant A Absent N Non-invitee I Invitee W Withdrawn									
P Participant A Absent N Non-invitee I Invitee W Withdrawn					Burkindine	Larcomb	Myrick	Oakes	Wright
1	March 26, 2026	North County Republican Club	Kimberly Klacik; Torrey Snow; Yuripzy Morgan	YouTube	P	P	P	P	P
2	May 19, 2026	Maryland Public Television	Matt Bush	YouTube	A	P	P	A	P

=== Fundraising ===
Campaign finance reports as of June 7, 2026
Candidate	Raised	Spent	Cash on hand
Carl Brunner (R)	$3,368	$3,359	$10
L. D. Burkindine (R)	$1,080	$348	$732
Dan Cox (R)	$100,499 (Note: $25,800 of this total was self-funded by Cox)	$146,929	$30,346
Ed Hale (R)	$274,501	$220,779	$53,722
John Myrick (R)	$26,725	$47,238	$3,152
Shannon Wright (R) (Note: As of last reported May 12, 2026)	$172	$26,196	$15,236
Source: Maryland State Board of Elections

=== Results ===
Results by county Cox: 30–40%; 40–50%; 50–60%; 60–70%; Hale: 40–50%; 50–60%; 60–70%

Results by county Cox: 20–30%; 30–40%; 40–50%; 50–60%; 60–70%; 70–80%; 80–90%; >90%; Hale: 20–30%; 30–40%; 40–50%; 50–60%; 60–70%; 70–80%; 80–90%; >90%; Myrick: 30–40%; 40–50%; 50–60%; 60–70%; >90%; Brunner: 20–30%; 30–40%; 40–50%; 50–60%; 60–70%; 80–90%; >90%; Wright: 30–40%; 40–50%; 50–60%; 60–70%; 80–90%; >90%; Burkindine: 50–60%; 60–70%; >90%; Taylor: 40–50%; 50–60%; >90%; Oakes: >90%; Larcomb: 30–40%; >90%; Tie No data/No votes

Republican primary results
Party	Candidate	Votes	%
Republican	Dan Cox; Robert Krop	89,982	43.3
Republican	Ed Hale; Tyrone Keys	74,877	36.0
Republican	John Myrick; Brenda Thiam	13,200	6.4
Republican	Carl Brunner; Kevin Rhodes	12,700	6.1
Republican	Shannon Wright; Reba Hawkins	4,907	2.4
Republican	L. D. Burkindine; Jeremy Shifflett	3,746	1.8
Republican	Nancy Taylor†; Rachael "Mohawk" Swift	3,690	1.8
Republican	Michael Oakes; Ronald Abend	2,583	1.2
Republican	Douglas Larcomb; Martina Duncan	2,132	1.0
Total votes		207,817	100.0

== Third-party and independent candidates ==
Green Party nominee Andy Ellis

=== Candidates ===
==== Declared ====
- Andy Ellis (Green), former co-chair of the Maryland Green Party and candidate for Maryland House of Delegates in 2018
  - Running mate: Owen Silverman Andrews, teacher
- Cathy White (Working Class Party), nominee for lieutenant governor in 2022
  - Running mate: Cathy Permut

=== Fundraising ===
Campaign finance reports as of June 7, 2026
Candidate	Raised	Spent	Cash on hand
Andy Ellis (G)	$37,429	$35,869	$1,560
Source: Maryland State Board of Elections

== General election ==
=== Campaign ===
Moore was widely expected to win re-election to a second term and entered the general election with a substantial fundraising advantage over Cox.

Moore campaigned on his efforts to address affordability issues, expand opportunities, and protect the state from the second Trump administration, whose actions have led to increased prices and caused the state to lose jobs and federal funding. Moore's campaign also sought to tie Cox to President Donald Trump, who endorsed Cox in 2022. Following the primary elections, the Maryland Democratic Party launched a website intended to remind voters about Cox's association with Trump as well as his past opposition to abortion rights, gun safety, and former President Joe Biden's victory in the 2020 United States presidential election. Cox pushed back against attempts to tie him to Trump, saying that he would not be seeking the president's endorsement and would be focusing his campaign on local issues.

Cox campaigned against Moore's handling of economic issues. Following the Republican primary, the Maryland Republican Party and its leaders embraced Cox, with Maryland Senate minority leader Steve Hershey and House of Delegates minority leader Jason C. Buckel telling The Baltimore Sun that they believed Cox could defeat Moore with an affordability-focused campaign as opposed to 2022 campaign platform, which highlighted far-right policy stances and baseless conspiracy theories. At the same time, Republican legislative leaders stated that their path to competing against Moore would rely less on defending Cox and more on persuading voters to focus on affordability and fiscal issues.

=== Predictions ===
Source	Ranking	As of
The Cook Political Report	Solid D	October 29, 2026
Decision Desk HQ	Safe D	November 3, 2026
Fox News	Solid D	November 1, 2026
Inside Elections	Solid D	October 29, 2026
NBC News	Solid D	November 3, 2026
RealClearPolitics	Solid D	November 1, 2026
Sabato's Crystal Ball	Safe D	November 2, 2026
Silver Bulletin	Solid D	November 3, 2026

=== Post-primary endorsements ===
Wes Moore (D)

Labor unions

- International Association of Machinists and Aerospace Workers Maryland and D.C. State Council
- Maryland State & DC AFL-CIO

Organizations

- Everytown for Gun Safety
- Giffords
- Human Rights Campaign
Dan Cox (R)

Statewide officials

- Bob Ehrlich, former governor of Maryland (2003–2007)

State legislators

- Jason C. Buckel, minority leader of the Maryland House of Delegates (2021–present) from HD-1B (2015–present)
- J. B. Jennings, SD-07 (2011–present)
- Justin Ready, SD-05 (2015–present)
- Kathy Szeliga, HD-7A (2011–present)

Organizations

- Maryland Republican Party
- Republican Governors Association
Declined to endorse

Statewide officials

- Larry Hogan, former governor of Maryland (2015–2023) (Republican)

Labor unions

- Maryland State Fraternal Order of Police

=== Debates and forums ===
2026 Maryland Republican gubernatorial primary debates
No.	Date	Host	Moderator	Link	Participants	
P Participant A Absent N Non-invitee I Invitee W Withdrawn						
P Participant A Absent N Non-invitee I Invitee W Withdrawn					Moore	Cox
1	August 15, 2026	Maryland Association of Counties	Bryan P. Sears; Mileah Kromer	N/A	P	P
2	October 6, 2026	Maryland Public Television	Jason Newton	YouTube	P	P

=== Fundraising ===
Campaign finance reports as of November 10, 2026
Candidate	Raised	Spent	Cash on hand
Wes Moore (D)	$17,170,702	$17,913,350	$1,750,438
Dan Cox (R)	$393,402 (Note: $81,067 of this total was self-funded by Cox)	$488,556	$59,889
Andy Ellis (G)	$38,066	$37,832	$234
Cathy White (WCP)	$110	$95	$15
Source: Maryland State Board of Elections

=== Polling ===
Poll source	Date(s) administered	Sample size (Note: Key: A – all adults RV – registered voters LV – likely voters V – unclear)	Margin of error	Wes Moore (D)	Dan Cox (R)	Other	Undecided
University of Maryland, Baltimore County	September 22−27, 2026	776 (LV)	± 3.5%	51%	24%	11% (Note: Andy Ellis (G) with 3%, Cathy White (WCP) with 3%, and "Some other candidate" with 5%)	14%
Zenith Research (Note: Poll sponsored by Blended Public Affairs and Perry Jacobson)	July 27 − August 3, 2026	800 (LV)	± 3.5%	58%	31%	3% (Note: "Someone else" with 3%)	9%

Hypothetical polling

Wes Moore vs. Larry Hogan

Poll source	Date(s) administered	Sample size	Margin of error	Wes Moore (D)	Larry Hogan (R)	Undecided
OpinionWorks	October 7−10, 2025	928 (RV)	± 3.2%	45%	37%	14%
Gonzales Research	December 27, 2024 − January 4, 2025	811 (RV)	± 3.5%	52%	38%	10%

Wes Moore vs. Generic Republican

Poll source	Date(s) administered	Sample size	Margin of error	Wes Moore (D)	Generic Republican	Other	Undecided
Gonzales Research	December 21, 2025 − January 6, 2026	808 (RV)	± 3.5%	50%	28%	6% (Note: "Third-party candidate" with 6%)	16%
University of Maryland, Baltimore County	October 21−25, 2025	757 (RV)	± 3.5%	49%	29%	12%	10%
OpinionWorks	October 7−10, 2025	928 (RV)	± 3.2%	47%	29%	–	21%

=== Results ===
2026 Maryland gubernatorial election
Party	Candidate	Votes	%	±%
Democratic	Wes Moore (incumbent); Aruna Miller (incumbent)	1,470,907	65.29%	+0.76%
Republican	Dan Cox; Robert Krop	683,658	30.35%	−1.81%
Green	Andy Ellis; Owen Silverman Andrews	48,592	2.16%	+1.43%
Working Class	Cathy White; Cathy Permut	43,714	1.94%	+1.08%
Write-in		5,950	0.26%	+0.07%
Total votes		2,252,821	100.0%	N/A

==== By county ====
County	Moore/Miller		Cox/Krop		Others		Margin		Total Votes
County	#	%	#	%	#	%	#	%	Total Votes
Allegany	7,139	32.62%	13,859	63.33%	885	4.04%	-6,720	-30.71%	21,883
Anne Arundel	132,005	56.66%	90,520	38.85%	10,463	4.49%	41,485	17.81%	232,988
Baltimore	187,096	61.43%	102,461	33.64%	15,024	4.93%	84,635	27.79%	304,581
Baltimore City	144,773	84.43%	15,363	8.96%	11,334	6.61%	129,410	75.46%	171,470
Calvert	17,408	43.68%	20,722	52.00%	1,723	4.32%	-3,314	-8.32%	39,853
Caroline	3,427	29.05%	7,882	66.82%	487	4.13%	-4,455	-37.76%	11,796
Carroll	26,386	35.49%	44,749	60.18%	3,220	4.33%	-18,363	-24.70%	74,355
Cecil	12,706	35.67%	21,441	60.19%	1,474	4.14%	-8,735	-24.52%	35,621
Charles	50,882	72.47%	16,324	23.25%	3,009	4.29%	34,558	49.22%	70,215
Dorchester	5,139	39.35%	7,369	56.43%	551	4.22%	-2,230	-17.08%	13,059
Frederick	67,111	57.59%	44,816	38.46%	4,601	3.95%	22,295	19.13%	116,528
Garrett	2,539	23.23%	8,044	73.58%	349	3.19%	-5,505	-50.36%	10,932
Harford	46,994	42.26%	59,315	53.34%	4,903	4.41%	-12,321	-11.08%	111,212
Howard	99,539	71.12%	33,909	24.23%	6,512	4.65%	65,630	46.89%	139,960
Kent	4,158	46.81%	4,403	49.57%	322	3.62%	-245	-2.76%	8,883
Montgomery	311,044	80.49%	62,211	16.10%	13,199	3.42%	386,454	64.39%	386,454
Prince George's									
Queen Anne's	8,503	34.37%	15,291	61.80%	947	3.83%	-6,788	-27.44%	24,741
St. Mary's	17,412	41.08%	22,923	54.08%	2,053	4.84%	-5,511	-13.00%	42,388
Somerset	2,979	39.19%	4,351	57.24%	271	3.57%	-1,372	-18.05%	7,601
Talbot	8,908	47.98%	9,106	49.04%	553	2.98%	-198	-1.07%	18,567
Washington	20,779	41.34%	27,383	54.48%	2,105	4.19%	-6,604	-13.14%	50,267
Wicomico	16,286	47.58%	16,400	47.91%	1,544	4.51%	-114	-0.33%	34,230
Worcester	9,190	37.29%	14,566	59.10%	889	3.61%	-5,376	-21.81%	24,645
Total									

Counties that flipped from Democratic to Republican

- Kent (largest community: Chestertown)
- Talbot (largest community: Easton)

== See also ==
- 2026 United States gubernatorial elections
- 2026 Maryland elections

== Notes ==
Partisan clients
