= Steuart Pittman =

American politician (born 1961)

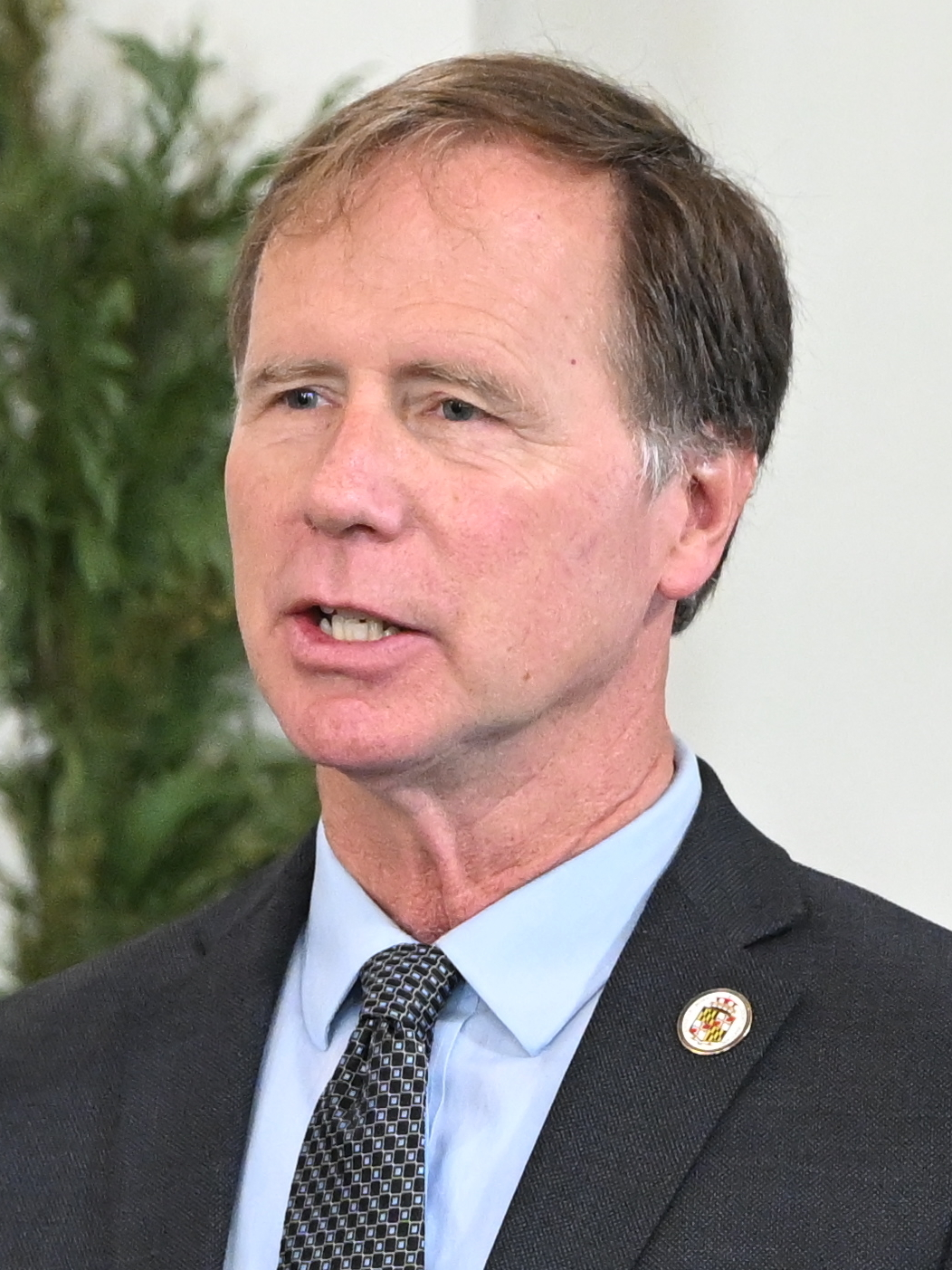
- Pittman in 2024

Chair of the Maryland Democratic Party
- Incumbent
- Assumed office June 27, 2025
- Preceded by: Charlene Dukes (acting)

11th County Executive of Anne Arundel County
- Incumbent
- Assumed office December 3, 2018
- Preceded by: Steve Schuh

Personal details
- Born: September 11, 1961 (age 65) Davidsonville, Maryland, U.S.
- Party: Democratic
- Spouse(s): Karen Cunnyngham (div. 2008) Erin (m. 2008)
- Children: 3
- Relatives: Steuart family
- Education: University of Chicago (BA)

Steuart L. Pittman Jr. (born September 11, 1961) is an American politician and farmer who has served as county executive of Anne Arundel County, Maryland, since 2018. A member of the Democratic Party, Pittman has served as the chair of the Maryland Democratic Party since June 2025.

Born in Davidsonville, Maryland, and raised in Washington, D.C., Pittman graduated from the University of Chicago before working as a community organizer in Chicago, Iowa, and Maryland. He left the organizing world in 1994 to become a professional horse trainer and farmer at Dodon Farm in 1994, serving as the president of the Maryland Horse Council from 2009 to 2013 and founding the Retired Racehorse Project in 2010. Pittman returned to politics following the 2016 United States presidential election, and won election as Anne Arundel County executive in 2018, defeating Republican incumbent Steve Schuh in an upset. He was re-elected in 2022. During his tenure, Pittman oversaw the county's response to the COVID-19 pandemic and the redevelopment of the former Crownsville Hospital Center.

== Early life and education ==
Pittman was born on his family's farm in Davidsonville, Maryland, on September 11, 1961. He was one of three children born to Steuart Pittman, a Marine veteran and former assistant secretary of defense under President John F. Kennedy, and Barbara Pittman. Pittman's ancestor, George Hume Steuart, emigrated to Maryland from Scotland in 1721, made a career as a tobacco planter and slave owner, and served as the mayor of Annapolis from 1759 to 1763.

Pittman grew up in Washington, D.C., where he attended St. Albans School. He also spent summers at his family's farm, Dodon, in Davidsonville. Pittman attended the University of Chicago and earned a Bachelor of Arts degree in political science and Latin American studies in 1985.

== Career ==
=== Early career ===
Pittman first became involved with politics as a community organizer in Chicago and Des Moines, Iowa. Afterwards, he returned to Maryland to work as a field director for the National Low Income Housing Coalition from 1990 to 1992, and the director for national campaigns for the Association of Community Organizations for Reform Now from 1992 to 1994. He became involved in politics again following the election of Donald Trump as president in 2016, first exploring a run for the Anne Arundel County Council in District 7 before Sarah Elfreth, a candidate for the Maryland Senate, asked if he considered running for county executive instead.

Pittman started riding horses at a very young age, when his parents bought him a pony. He joined the St. Margaret's Pony Club in Annapolis, Maryland. His passion for horses eventually led him to became a trainer, instructor, and competitor at the Advanced level of three day eventing. Pittman left the organizing world to become a professional horse trainer and farmer at Dodon Farm in 1994. He was the president of the Maryland Horse Council from 2009 to 2013, and founded the Retired Racehorse Project in 2010. He also wrote a blog about how to train horses, titled "Listen To The Horse".

=== Anne Arundel County Executive ===
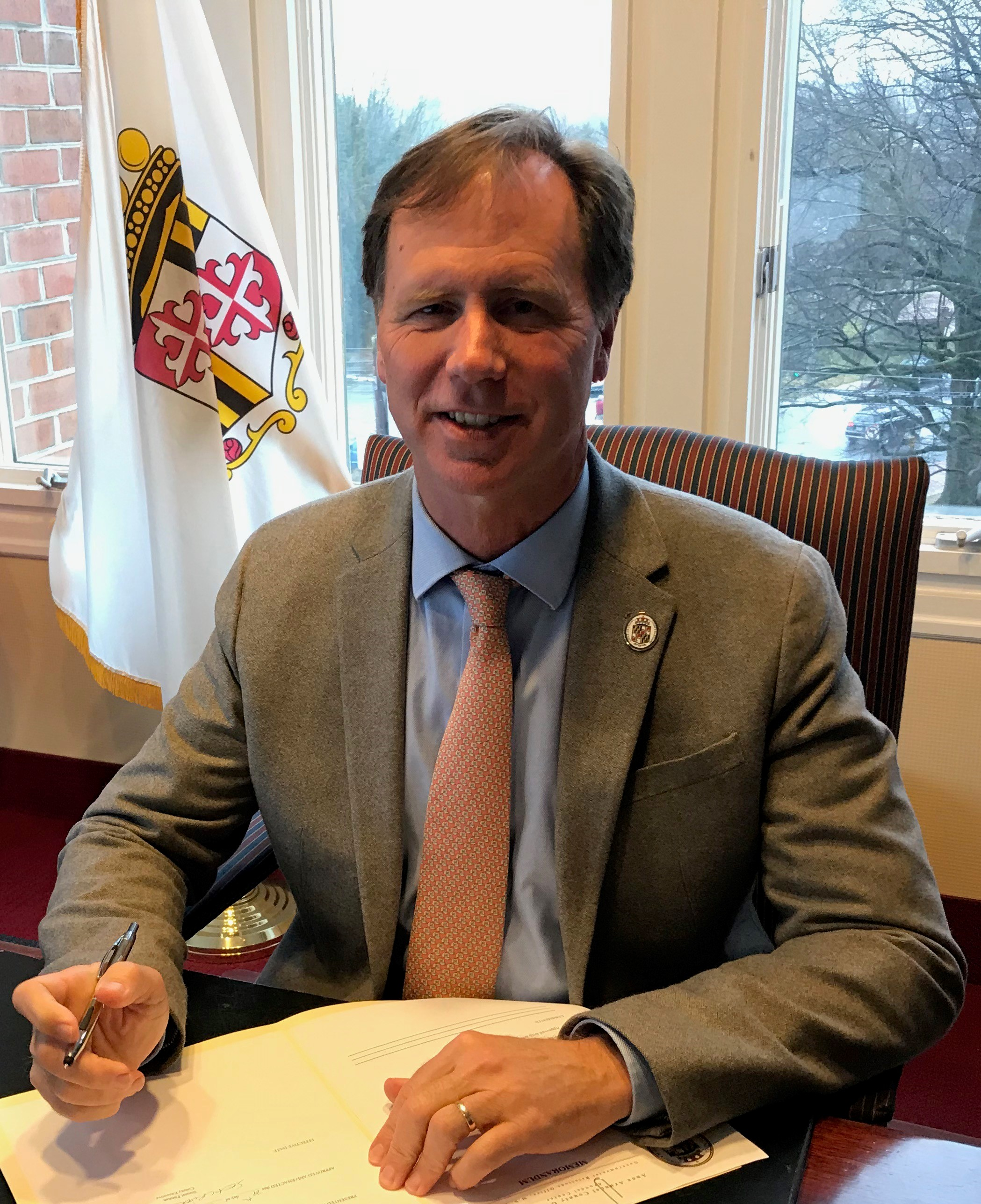
Pittman signing legislation in January 2019

On November 16, 2017, Pittman announced that he would run for Anne Arundel County executive in 2018, challenging incumbent Republican county executive Steve Schuh. During his campaign, he ran on a platform of supporting local businesses, redevelopment and land preservation, and increasing developer impact fees to pay for infrastructure. He also criticized Schuh for supporting policies that Pittman claimed would lead to population growth and denser developments in the county. During the election, Pittman received endorsements from county police and firefighter unions and received more individual contributions than Schuh, but was heavily outspent by Schuh throughout the campaign. On November 6, 2018, Pittman defeated Schuh in an upset, receiving 52.3% of the vote to Schuh's 47.6%. He was sworn in on December 3, 2018, becoming Anne Arundel County's first Democratic county executive since Janet S. Owens, who served as county executive from 1998 to 2006.

In November 2020, Pittman launched Future Matters, a nonprofit education and advocacy organization to promote policies to address various economic, education, and development issues. The advocacy group held monthly virtual forums to promote finding "common ground" solutions to these issues.

Pittman ran for re-election in 2022. He faced Republican county councilmember Jessica Haire in the general election, whom he criticized for voting against his budget proposals and accepting contributions from Halle Companies, a development company that sought to build a rubble landfill in Odenton. On November 8, 2022, Pittman defeated Haire with 53.7% of the vote to Haire's 46.1%.

In October 2024, Pittman launched a weekly podcast titled "Pittman and Friends", which focuses on how government works.

In December 2025, the Anne Arundel County Ethics Commission found that Pittman violated the county's ethics rules after writing about the results of the 2025 United States elections in the county's official newsletter. Pittman acknowledged the commission's findings and accepted responsibility for the content of the letter.

==== COVID-19 pandemic ====
In March 2020, Pittman announced that Anne Arundel County had recorded its first case of COVID-19. Soon after, he signed a series of executive orders declaring a state of emergency in Anne Arundel County and requiring face masks while in public, and established programs to help low-income individuals keep up with rent payments.

In May 2020, after Governor Larry Hogan announced plans to reopen state beaches and parks, Pittman signed onto a letter asking for more input on discussions involving the reopening of Maryland's economy. He further complained that Hogan provided officials with no prior warning before announcing his reopening plans, requiring him to scramble to figure out whether the county's health officer supported Hogan's orders and how to implement them on short notice. As Hogan continued to announce gradual reopening steps, Pittman consulted with local health authorities before moving forward with any reopenings, expressing concerns that Hogan was moving to reopen before central Maryland counties were ready. He later announced that the county would begin taking limited steps toward reopening to prevent a second wave, though he continued to criticize Hogan for leaving the first phase of reopening up to local jurisdictions and for communicating poorly with county officials. Anne Arundel County's later reopening steps gradually started mirroring statewide reopening guidelines, though officials remained cautious of a potential second wave. Pittman also supported a county bill that would prohibit any landlord from raising rent by more than 3% during Maryland's state of emergency, which failed to pass.

In July 2020, following an increase in cases in the county, Pittman reimposed restrictions on restaurants and social gatherings to prevent further spread of the virus. In September 2020, Pittman said that Anne Arundel County would not immediately follow Hogan in moving into phase three of reopening, citing a slowly rising seven-day positivity rate in the county, but rejected advice from Anne Arundel County Health Officer Nilesh Kalyanaraman to impose further closures. The county would later expand its pop-up community testing sites to help contain the spread of the virus and announce additional homeowner and small business relief programs funded by CARES Act stimulus funding. In November 2020, as cases rapidly increased across the state, Pittman signed onto a letter with other county executives calling on Hogan to work with them to contain the spread of COVID-19, saying that it had been five months since the governor last reached out to them and hasn't given officials an advance notice when making reopening announcements. He also announced new restrictions on social gatherings and restaurant capacities.

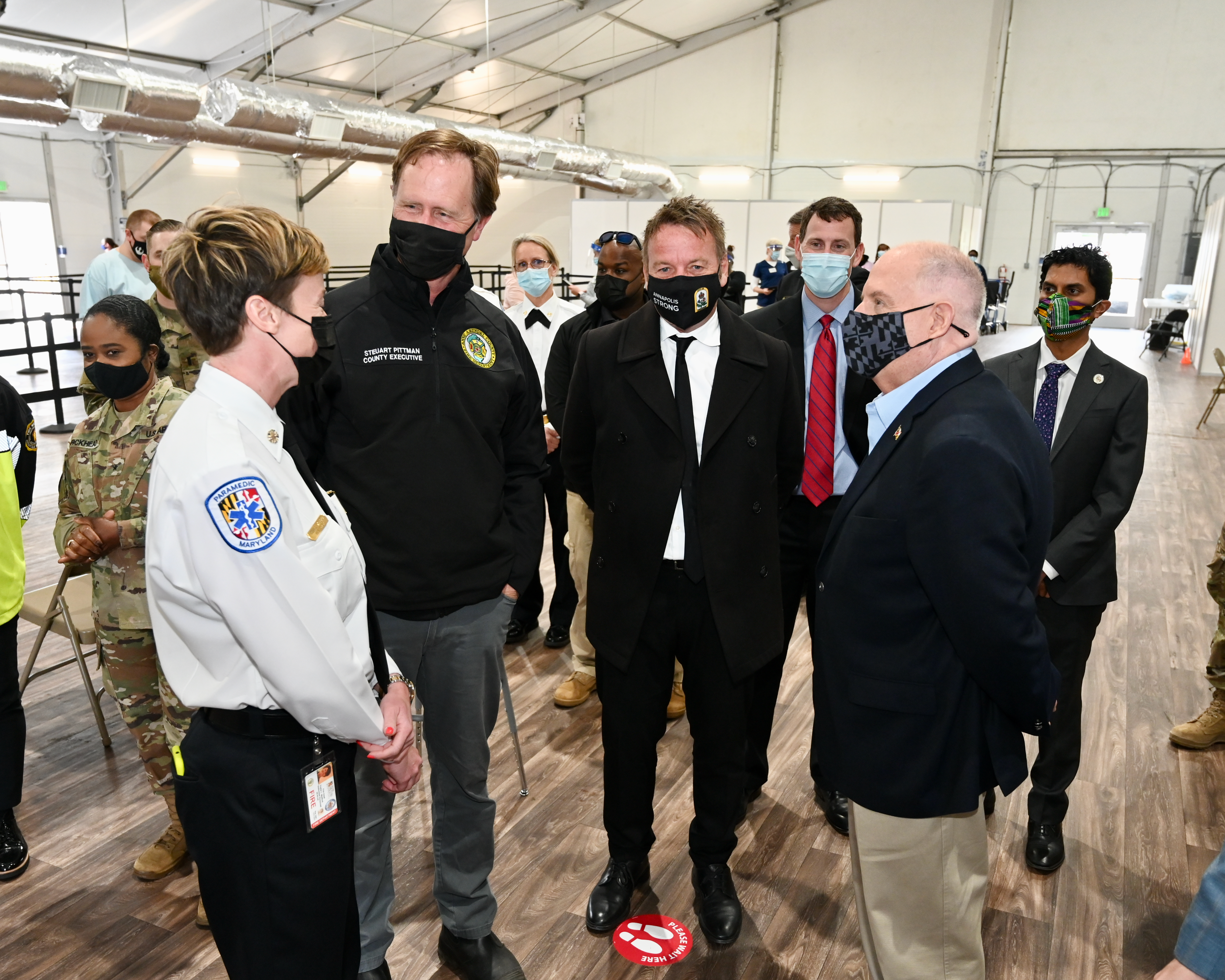
Pittman tours the Navy–Marine Corps Memorial Stadium mass vaccination site with Governor Larry Hogan and Annapolis mayor Gavin Buckley, April 2021

The first COVID-19 vaccines in Anne Arundel County were given to medical staff in risky positions in late December 2024, with the county soon announcing a vaccinations schedule prioritizing health department employees and public safety workers before adopting the statewide vaccination schedule. In January 2021, he called on Hogan to provide better vaccine coordination with county officials so that local health departments could be aware of which private sector pharmacies were receiving doses and how many they were getting. In March 2021, Pittman announced that the Navy–Marine Corps Memorial Stadium would be used as a mass vaccination site, with vaccinations soft-launching as soon as April 15.

Pittman began lifting restrictions on social gatherings, mask mandates, and restaurant capacities as COVID-19 case rates continued to decline in April 2021, In June 2021, the Anne Arundel County Council voted unanimously to pass a bill ending the county's COVID-19 state of emergency while allowing restaurants to continue providing outdoor dining, which Pittman signed into law later that month.

In August 2021, Pittman reinstated the county's indoor mask mandate following an increase in COVID-19 cases from the Delta variant and imposed a COVID-19 vaccine mandate on county employees. In December 2021, he again reinstated the county's indoor mask mandate amid the rapid rise of the omicron variant. In January 2022, after the Anne Arundel County Council voted against allowing Pittman to extend the county's mask mandate through the end of the month, Pittman supported the Anne Arundel County Department of Health's issuance of a public safety order to extend the mask mandate until January 31.

==== Environment ====
During his 2018 county executive campaign, Pittman supported increasing fees to deter the deforestation in Anne Arundel County and said that he hoped to work with the county council to pass a no net loss forest conservation bill. In October 2019, he introduced a bill that would double the county's reforestation ratio and increase fees and conservation thresholds for developments. After the bill was weakened by the Anne Arundel County Council, Pittman said that he would still sign the bill into law, after which the county council passed amendments increasing impact fees and unanimously passed the bill. Pittman signed the forest conservation bill into law in November 2019. In May 2021, after a bill that would've required anyone clearing 5,000 square feet or more of trees to have a grading permit was defeated by the Anne Arundel County Council, Pittman said that he would work with county councilmembers to address their concerns.

In February 2020, Pittman supported the Climate Solutions Act, which would increase Maryland's greenhouse gas emissions reduction goal from 40% to 60% by 2030, with a goal of net-zero emissions by 2045.

In August 2021, Pittman supported the Polluters Pay Climate Fund Act, a federal bill introduced by Senator Chris Van Hollen that would require the United States's largest polluters to pay $500 billion into a climate fund over 10 years, saying that it would, if passed, provide the county with additional revenue to spend toward infrastructure projects to respond to climate change.

In August 2022, Pittman proposed to the U.S. Navy that Greenbury Point, a 150-acre wetland forest, be turned over to Anne Arundel County on a long-term lease for use as a conservation area instead of being transformed into a 18-hole golf course.

==== Gun safety ====
During his 2018 county executive campaign, Pittman supported an expansion of the state's red flag laws and said that the Capital Gazette shooting should open the eyes of Anne Arundel County residents to the glorification of guns. In April 2019, Pittman signed an executive order creating a task force to develop recommendations on how to reduce gun violence in the county. After the task force published its preliminary report in December 2019, Pittman introduced a resolution declaring gun violence a public health crisis. The task force published a report with 55 recommendations on how to lower gun deaths through targeted social and public health solutions in June 2020.

In January 2022, Pittman signed into law a bill requiring gun sellers to offer pamphlets to customers detailing suicide prevention resources, and another gun store owners to install video surveillance, exterior bollards, and concrete barriers. The suicide prevention bill was subject of a lawsuit by Maryland Shall Issue, which ended in the U.S. Supreme Court denying a hearing on an appeal of a ruling upholding the law as constitutional.

==== Housing and development ====
Pittman is a self-proclaimed YIMBY. During his 2018 county executive campaign, he criticized the speed of growth and development in the county and policies that he said subsidized development, such as the county's payment in lieu of taxes deal with Live! Casino & Hotel, and said that he would strictly focus on small area plans as county executive. During his tenure as county executive, Pittman utilized a smart growth model and prioritized redevelopment over new developments, supported transit-oriented development projects, and provided payment in lieu of taxes deals to several affordable housing and senior housing developers building in the county.

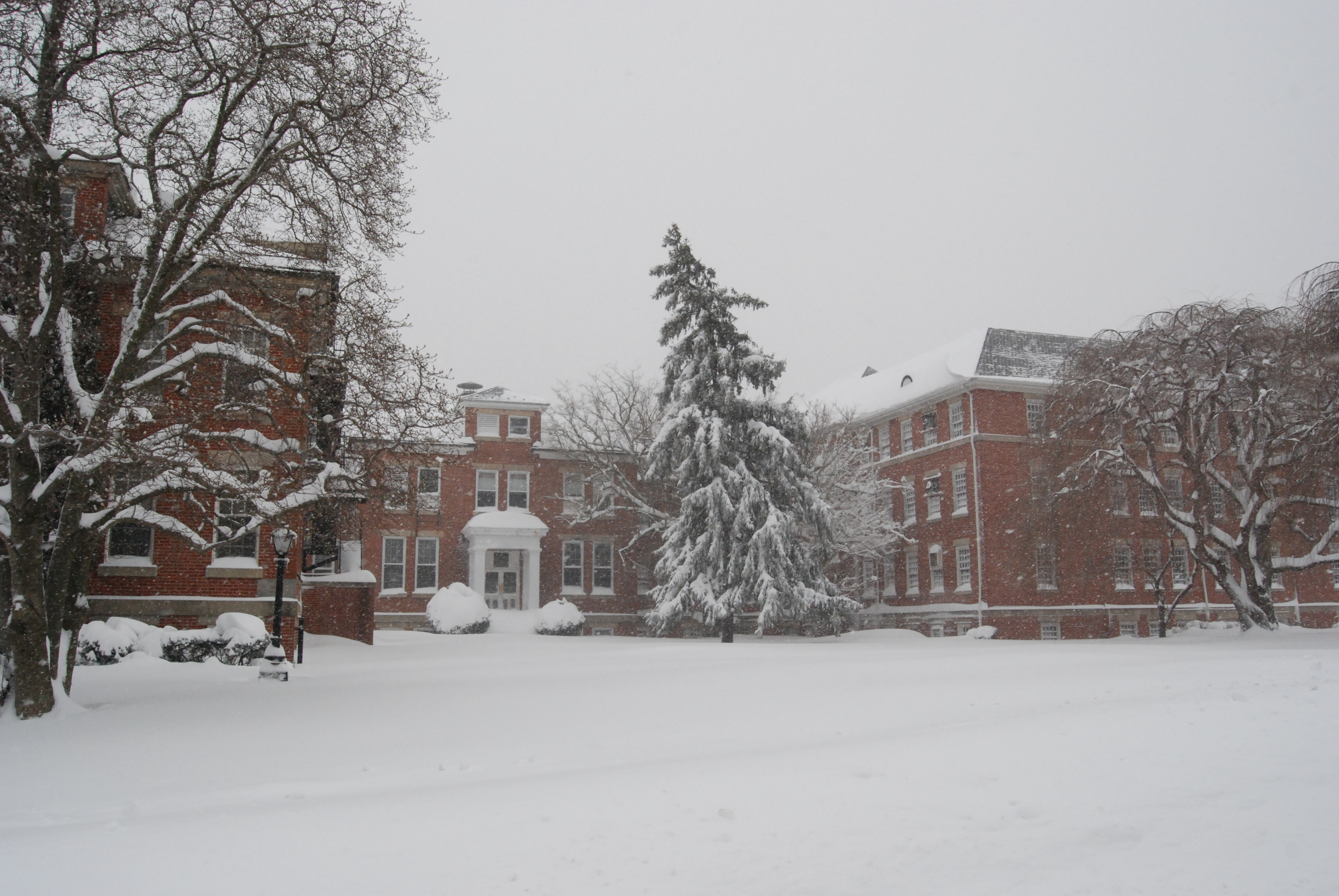
Pittman has pushed for the redevelopment of the Crownsville Hospital Center (pictured in 2010) during his tenure as county executive.

During his 2018 county executive campaign, Pittman pledged to push for the county to take over the Crownsville Hospital Center from the state and entertained proposals to redevelop the land into a nature park or community solar farm. In July 2022, the Maryland Board of Public Works voted to transfer the Crownsville Hospital Center property from the state of Maryland to Anne Arundel County, after which Pittman said he planned to use the $30 million given to the county earlier that year for asbestos remediation and renovation costs at the long-abandoned hospital buildings. Anne Arundel County finalized a multi-million dollar plan to redevelop the site to include mental health care facilities and a memorial park honoring the hospital's victims in February 2025.

In June 2019, Pittman unveiled an affordable housing plan for Anne Arundel County, which included a ban on discrimination in housing and expanding county workforce housing opportunities for developers. The bills were passed by the Anne Arundel County Council in September 2019.

In August 2019, Pittman said he opposed proposals to build a new Chesapeake Bay crossing, saying that the proposals would destroy communities and suggesting the state should instead consider other options to alleviate traffic on the Chesapeake Bay Bridge, such as bus rapid transit and ferries. In September 2019, he criticized state transportation officials for not implementing electronic toll collection systems at the Chesapeake Bay Bridge amid traffic delays stemming from the commencement of a two-year redecking project, saying the decision made "a bad decision worse in my mind". The Maryland Transportation Authority began using electronic tolling systems on the westbound span of the bridge a few days later.

In October 2023, Pittman introduced the Essential Worker Housing Access Act, a bill that would require new rental developments to designate 15% of their units for people earning 75% of the median income or below, and all new for-sale developments with more than 20 units to assign 10% of them for people earning no more than the area's median income. The bill failed to pass the Anne Arundel County Council after county councilmember Allison Pickard joined Republicans in voting against it, saying that she felt the bill would not have a big impact on the county residents given the county's low building rate. He also introduced another bill that would provide incentives to developers to redevelop vacant properties rather than construct new ones, which failed to pass the county council in a 2–5 vote in January 2024. In September 2024, Pittman introduced the Housing Attainability Act, which would require all new housing developments with 20 or more units to designate 10% of for-sale units and 15% of rental units to be affordable, which was passed by the Anne Arundel County Council in October 2024.

In July 2024, Pittman issued his first veto to portions of the county's comprehensive rezoning plan that would rezone properties on Shot Town Road, a historically Black neighborhood on Broadneck Peninsula, and on Ember Road in Pasadena.

==== Public safety ====
During his 2018 county executive campaign, Pittman supported ending the county's 287(g) program, saying that it stoked fears within immigrant communities. In December 2018, Pittman announced that he would end the county's 287(g) program. At the same time, he allowed the county's U.S. Immigration and Customs Enforcement (ICE) detainee contract to continue, but began using some of the revenue earned from the contract to pay for legal aid. In January 2019, ICE ended its detainee contract with Anne Arundel County in retaliation against Pittman's decision to end the county's 287(g) program.

In November 2018, after The Baltimore Sun reported on racist acts targeting African-American students at Chesapeake High School and Chesapeake Bay Middle School, Pittman called for increased support for students impacted by acts of hate. He also supported efforts to expand school curriculum on diversity and create more inclusive county boards and committees. In November 2019, The Capital reported that Pittman's next budget would include provisions declaring racism a public health issue and provide funding for police body cameras to address hate crimes and hate bias incidents in Anne Arundel County.

In May 2020, Pittman condemned the murder of George Floyd, likening his death to lynchings against African-Americans in Anne Arundel County during the late 19th century. He later added a supplemental amendment to his budget proposal to fund police body cameras and promised additional police reforms during a meeting of the Caucus of African American Leaders in June 2020.

In January 2026, Pittman condemned what he called "unprecedented levels of ICE activity" in Anne Arundel County that led to the arrests of at least seven people in the Annapolis area, saying that ICE enforcement makes "communities less safe" and that agents are detaining "people who make our communities better". He also thanked volunteers who monitor ICE activity and alert people when officers are nearby and who are helping connect families affected by immigration enforcement with resources and support, encouraging county residents to "step up and support your neighbors" in response to ICE activity. In June 2026, Pittman signed an executive order prohibiting federal officials from accessing county property that is not accessible to the general public for purposes of immigration enforcement without a judicial warrant and requiring the Anne Arundel County Police Department to investigate allegations of criminal behavior involving federal agents.

==== Taxes ====
During his tenure as county executive, Pittman repeatedly proposed increases to Anne Arundel County's income and property taxes to pay for funding increases toward education, transportation, and public safety, though he did propose property tax cuts in his fiscal year 2022 and 2026 budgets.

During the 2020 legislative session, he supported a bill that would allow counties to set progressive income tax brackets. He again supported the bill during the 2021 legislative session, during which it passed but was vetoed by Governor Larry Hogan in May 2021; afterwards, Pittman said he supported overriding Hogan's veto on the bill and as well as his veto of a bill allowing Anne Arundel County to raise its taxes on property sales above $1 million. State legislators overrode Hogan's veto on the bill in December 2021, after which Pittman proposed a progressive income tax in Anne Arundel County. The Anne Arundel County Council approved the county's fiscal year 2023 budget, which included Pittman's progressive income tax proposal, in June 2022.

During the 2024 legislative session, Pittman supported the Fair Share for Maryland Act, a state bill that would increase state income taxes for wealthy individuals, close corporate loopholes, and implement combined reporting.

=== Chair of the Maryland Democratic Party ===
Pittman and Governor Wes Moore, who endorsed his candidacy for chair of the Maryland Democratic Party, in 2026

On May 21, 2025, Maryland Democratic Party chair Kenneth Ulman announced that he would step down as party chair on June 13, 2025. Afterwards, Ulman and Governor Wes Moore endorsed Pittman to replace Ulman. During his campaign, Pittman said that he would seek to expand the party's financial and grassroots capabilities and work with county parties to recruit and support candidates in the 2026 elections.

Pittman was the only candidate on the ballot when the members of the Maryland Democratic Party elected its new chair on June 21, 2025. However, he was prohibited from fully taking office by state law, which first requires him to close the campaign finance accounts he used during his campaigns for county executive. A spokesperson for the Maryland Democratic Party told Maryland Matters that the closure of Pittman's accounts "is underway and should be complete before the end of June", and that vice chair Charlene Dukes will continue acting as the party chair until the accounts are closed out. On June 26, the Maryland State Board of Elections levied $700 in fines connected to sloppy recordkeeping and underreported campaign expenses against Pittman, who subsequently closed his campaign account.

During his tenure, the Maryland Democratic Party adopted a more aggressive posture in press releases and on social media, with the party calling the One Big Beautiful Bill Act the "One Big Bullshit Bill" and referring to President Donald Trump as a "sex pest with daddy issues" in a now-deleted post criticizing Trump for suggesting that he may mobilize the National Guard to police communities in Baltimore. He was also involved in efforts to recruit candidates for every state- and county-level election, which led to Democratic candidates filing to run for every legislative seat for the first time since 1974. During the 2026 elections, Maryland Democrats flipped four seats in the Maryland House of Delegates, one seat in the Maryland Senate, and the county executive's office in Wicomico County.

In June 2026, during Maryland's primary elections, the Maryland Democratic Party began sending mailers to Republican primary voters promoting former state delegate Dan Cox over businessman Ed Hale, promoting Trump's endorsement of Cox during the 2022 Maryland gubernatorial election and criticizing Hale for switching parties during the campaign. Pittman defended the spending, saying that the party planned to "educate voters on the dangers of the Republicans running for office who seek to take Maryland backwards". Cox won the Republican primary on June 23, 2026, defeating Hale with 43.3 percent of the vote, and was defeated by Moore in the general election on November 3, 2026. Pittman did not seek re-election as the chair of the Maryland Democratic Party and endorsed Vice Chair Charlene Dukes to succeed him.

== Political positions ==
=== Health care ===
In March 2019, Pittman recorded a radio advertisement to support a state bill that would establish a Prescription Drug Affordability Board, which would be tasked with negotiating the prices of prescription drugs. In July 2025, he criticized the Senate passage of the One Big Beautiful Bill Act, saying that it would "strip away health care, shutter rural hospitals, gut food assistance, and spike costs to fund a massive tax giveaway for billionaires". In September 2025, Pittman urged members of the Prescription Drug Affordability Board to set upper payment limits on Jardiance and Farxiga, two prescription drugs used for treating Type 2 diabetes.

=== National politics ===
In January 2019, Pittman called for an end to the 2018–2019 United States federal government shutdown, saying that Anne Arundel County was exploring the need to use county funds to assist furloughed federal employees and supplement federal and utility assistance programs affected by the shutdown.

In April 2020, Pittman endorsed former Vice President Joe Biden in the 2020 United States presidential election. He was a delegate to the 2020 Democratic National Convention, pledged to Biden. In the 2024 presidential election, Pittman voted as an elector pledged to Kamala Harris.

In March 2025, Pittman participated in a protest at Wiley H. Bates Middle School against President Donald Trump's proposed cuts to the U.S. Department of Education. He also created a federal employee assistance section on the county's website and hosted federal career transition hiring events to help federal workers impacted by the Trump administration's mass layoffs.

=== Social issues ===
Pittman supports the right to an abortion. In June 2022, following the U.S. Supreme Court's decision in Dobbs v. Jackson Women's Health Organization, Pittman attended and spoke at a pro-abortion rally in Annapolis.

During his 2018 county executive campaign, Pittman supported banning developers with applications pending before the county from giving campaign contributions to county public officials, though he himself accepted developer contributions during his campaign. In March 2019, he supported a state bill giving the Anne Arundel County Council the ability to pass campaign finance reforms, which was signed into law by Governor Larry Hogan in May 2019. In February 2022, Pittman supported a county council resolution that would've placed on the 2022 ballot a referendum on whether to establish a public campaign financing program in Anne Arundel County. After this resolution failed to pass, he introduced a bill in May 2023 to establish a public campaign financing program. In December 2023, after the Anne Arundel County Council failed to pass the Essential Worker Housing Access Act, Pittman introduced a bill to place campaign financing limits on donations from developers.

In September 2019, Pittman unveiled a marker commemorating five African-Americans lynched across Anne Arundel County between 1875 and 1911. In July 2020, he renamed the park where this marker was unveiled to "The People's Park" in honor of the predominantly Black former residents of the area who were displaced by racially exclusionary housing policies.

In 2021, Pittman established the Anne Arundel County Equity, Diversity, and Inclusion Department with the goal of ensuring that county government entities are providing the best possible services for county residents. In February 2025, he condemned President Donald Trump's efforts to roll back diversity, equity, and inclusion (DEI) initiatives in government, writing a post in his weekly newsletter emphasizing the importance of DEI programs.

In 2024, Pittman introduced a bill to ban discrimination in private employment and at public accommodations. The bill was passed by the Anne Arundel County Council in April 2024.

== Personal life ==
While in Iowa, Pittman married his first wife, Karen Cunnyngham, and had a daughter. The couple divorced in 2008. Pittman married his current wife, Erin—whom he met in 2006 when she sent him a horse that needed to be trained—in 2008. Together, they live on the Dodon Farm and have twin boys.

== Electoral history ==
2018 Anne Arundel County Executive election
Primary election
Party	Candidate	Votes	%
Democratic	Steuart Pittman	32,243	100.0
Total votes		32,243	100.0
General election
Democratic	Steuart Pittman	118,572	52.3
Republican	Steve Schuh (incumbent)	107,905	47.6
Write-in		259	0.1
Total votes		226,736	100.0
Democratic gain from Republican			

2022 Anne Arundel County Executive election
Primary election
Party	Candidate	Votes	%
Democratic	Steuart Pittman (incumbent)	43,130	100.0
Total votes		43,130	100.0
General election
Democratic	Steuart Pittman (incumbent)	115,421	53.7
Republican	Jessica Haire	99,004	46.1
Write-in		369	0.2
Total votes		214,794	100.0
Democratic hold			

Political offices
Preceded by Steve Schuh	Executive of Anne Arundel County; 2018–present	Incumbent
Party political offices
Preceded by Charlene Dukes; Acting	Chair of the Maryland Democratic Party; 2025–present	Incumbent
