= Charlene Dukes =

American academic administrator (born 1954)

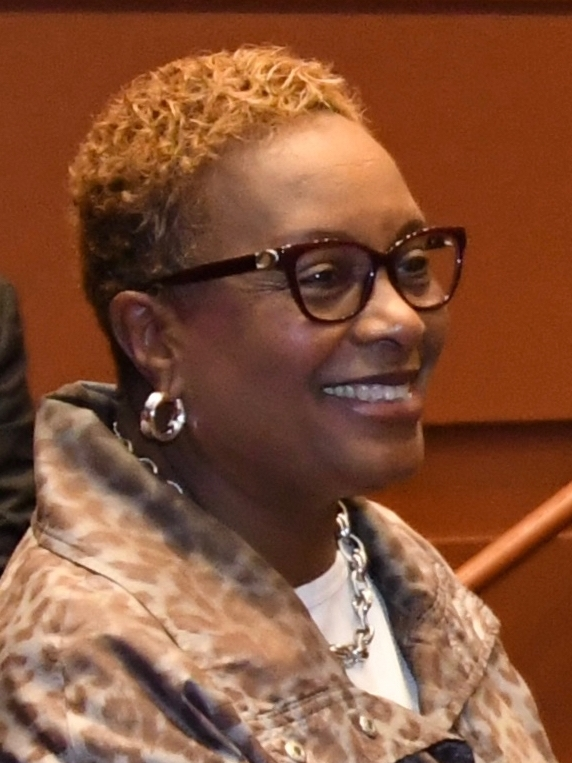
- Dukes in 2019

Chair of the Maryland Democratic Party
- Acting
- In office June 13, 2025 – June 27, 2025
- Preceded by: Ken Ulman
- Succeeded by: Steuart Pittman

Personal details
- Born: August 12, 1954 (age 71) Johnstown, Pennsylvania, U.S.
- Party: Democratic
- Children: 2
- Education: Indiana University of Pennsylvania (BS); University of Pittsburgh (MEd, EdD)

Charlene Mickens Dukes (born August 12, 1954) is an American academic administrator serving as the first vice chair of the Maryland Democratic Party since November 18, 2023. She was president of Prince George's Community College from July 1, 2007, to August 7, 2020.

== Early life and education ==
Dukes was born on August 12, 1954, in Johnstown, Pennsylvania. She was the second oldest of nine children and was raised in a two-bedroom house for the first fifteen years of her life. Dukes attended Indiana University of Pennsylvania (IUP) for a year before leaving due to racism and wanting to learn more about herself. She moved to New Jersey and worked for the Bell Telephone Company and later Chase Bank in New York. She re-enrolled at IUP, earning a B.S. in English and secondary education in 1980. She was a first-generation college student. She was active in the Black Student Union. Dukes completed a M.Ed. (1987) and Ed.D. (1992) in administrative and policy studies from the University of Pittsburgh. Her dissertation was titled, Factors Contributing to the Process of Transferring by African-American Students from an Urban Community College to a Four-Year College.

== Career ==
Dukes was an admission and financial aid officer at the University of Pittsburgh at Johnstown from 1980 to 1981. She later joined the Community College of Allegheny County in 1981 as an assistant director of admissions. She was promoted to director of admissions in 1985 and director of minority affairs in 1991. In 1995, she served as dean of students. From 1995 to 2007, Dukes was the vice president for student services at the Prince George's Community College. On July 1, 2007, she became its eighth president and the first female to serve in the role. Duke retired on August 7, 2020.

In 2013, she was inducted into the Maryland Women's Hall of Fame. She served on the Prince George's County Board of Education, and was appointed by the governor to the Maryland State Board of Education. She served two terms as the vice-chair before being voted as board president. Dukes served as board chair of the Meyer Foundation and secretary of the Greater Washington Community Foundation. On August 7, 2021, she succeeded DeRionne P. Pollard as the interim president of Montgomery College. She was succeeded by Jermaine F. William in 2022. Dukes is vice chair on the board of CareFirst BlueCross BlueShield.

In July 2023, Duke was one of governor Wes Moore's six appointees to the Maryland Higher Education Commission. She is serving the remainder of James Coleman's five-year term that began on July 1, 2022. Dukes became the first vice chair of the Maryland Democratic Party on November 18, 2023. She had run unopposed and was endorsed by governor Moore. In the 2024 presidential election, Dukes voted as an elector pledged to Vice President Kamala Harris.

== Personal life ==
Dukes has a son and a stepson.

Party political offices
Preceded by Ken Ulman	Chair of the Maryland Democratic Party; Acting; 2025	Succeeded by Steuart Pittman
