= 2022 Maryland elections =

A general election was held in the U.S. state of Maryland on November 8, 2022. All of Maryland's executive officers were up for election as well as all of Maryland's eight seats in the United States House of Representatives, one of its U.S. senators, and the state legislature. Primaries were held on July 19, 2022. Polls were open from 7 AM to 8 PM EST.

The Democratic Party swept every statewide election, flipping the governorship and lieutenant governorship from the Republican Party, while maintaining supermajorities in the state's congressional delegation and the state legislature. As such, the party won full control of Maryland state government for the first time since 2014.

== United States Senate ==
Incumbent Democratic U.S. Senator Chris Van Hollen was first elected in 2016 with 60.9% of the vote, and was running for a second term. Ten Republican candidates filed to run in the election.

Van Hollen won reelection with 65.7% of the votes.

2022 United States Senate election in Maryland
Party	Candidate	Votes	%	±%
Democratic	Chris Van Hollen (incumbent)	1,316,897	65.77%	+4.88%
Republican	Chris Chaffee	682,293	34.07%	−1.60%
Write-in		3,146	0.16%	+0.02%
Total votes		2,002,336	100.0%	
Democratic hold				

== United States House of Representatives ==
Maryland has eight seats to the United States House of Representatives, which are currently held by seven Democrats and one Republican. This split was maintained after the election.

== Governor ==
Incumbent Republican governor Larry Hogan was term-limited by the Maryland Constitution and could not run for re-election. He was re-elected in 2018 with 55.4% of the vote.

The Democratic ticket of author Wes Moore and former State Delegate Aruna Miller defeated the Republican ticket of State Delegate Dan Cox and lawyer Gordana Schifanelli, receiving 64.5% of the votes. This was the highest margin of victory by any gubernatorial candidate in Maryland since William Donald Schaefer in 1986.

2022 Maryland gubernatorial election
Party	Candidate	Votes	%	±%
Democratic	Wes Moore; Aruna Miller	1,293,944	64.53%	+21.02%
Republican	Dan Cox; Gordana Schifanelli	644,000	32.12%	−24.23%
Libertarian	David Lashar; Christiana Logansmith	30,101	1.50%	+0.93%
Working Class	David Harding; Cathy White	17,154	0.86%	N/A
Green	Nancy Wallace; Patrick Elder	14,580	0.73%	+0.25%
Write-in		5,444	0.27%	+0.19%
Total votes		2,005,223	100.0%	N/A
Democratic gain from Republican				

== Comptroller ==
Incumbent Comptroller Peter Franchot was eligible to run for a fifth term, but instead ran for Governor of Maryland. Democratic candidates Bowie mayor Tim Adams and state delegate Brooke Lierman, and Republican Harford County executive Barry Glassman, filed to run in the primary election.

Lierman defeated Glassman, receiving 61.56% of the vote.

2022 Maryland Comptroller election
Party	Candidate	Votes	%	±%
Democratic	Brooke Lierman	1,223,044	61.56%	−10.51%
Republican	Barry Glassman	761,422	38.33%	+10.54%
Write-in		2,244	0.11%	-0.03%
Total votes		1,986,710	100.0%	
Democratic hold				

== Attorney general ==
Incumbent attorney general Brian Frosh was eligible to run for a third term, but announced on October 21, 2021, that he would be retiring at the end of his term in early 2023. Democratic candidates included U.S. representative and former lieutenant governor Anthony Brown and retired judge and former First Lady of Maryland Katie O'Malley. Republican candidates included former Montgomery County Board of Elections chairman Jim Shalleck and former Anne Arundel County councilmember and 2004 Constitution Party candidate for president Michael Peroutka.

Brown defeated Peroutka by a margin of over 30 percentage points.

2022 Maryland Attorney General election
Party	Candidate	Votes	%	±%
Democratic	Anthony Brown	1,287,418	64.95%	+0.18%
Republican	Michael Peroutka	691,910	34.90%	−0.21%
Write-in		2,962	0.15%	+0.07%
Total votes		1,982,290	100.0%	
Democratic hold				

== State legislature ==
All 47 seats in the Maryland Senate and 141 seats in the Maryland House of Delegates are up for election in 2022. Prior to the election, Democrats held a veto-proof majority in both chambers. They retained this majority, gaining seats in both houses.

=== State senate ===
Party	Before	After	Change
Democratic	32	34	▲2
Republican	15	13	▼2
Total	47	47	47

=== House of Delegates ===
Party	Before	After	Change
Democratic	99	102	▲3
Republican	42	39	▼3
Total	141	141	

== Local elections ==
Elections for county executives in eight of Maryland's 23 counties and numerous local elections also took place in 2022. Democratic candidates won county executive elections in Montgomery County, Prince George's County, Baltimore County, Frederick County, Howard County, and Anne Arundel County, while Republicans won in Harford County and Wicomico County.

== Ballot propositions ==
Maryland 2022 ballot propositions
Proposition	Description	Result	Yes		No	
Proposition	Description	Result	Votes	%	Votes	%
Question 1	Changes the names of the Maryland Court of Appeals to the Supreme Court of Maryland and the Maryland Court of Special Appeals to the Appellate Court of Maryland.	Yes	1,340,952	75.0	447,252	25.0
Question 2	Requires state legislative candidates to live in the district in which they are running, effective January 1, 2024.	Yes	1,684,519	90.2	183,099	9.8
Question 3	Raises the state's jury trial threshold from $15,000 to $25,000.	Yes	1,132,822	62.5	679,451	37.5
Question 4	Legalizes and taxes cannabis for adult use, effective July 1, 2023.	Yes	1,302,161	67.2	635,572	32.8
Question 5	Requires Howard County Circuit Court judges to serve as orphans' court judges and removes the election requirement of three orphans' court judges.	Yes	1,062,187	66.8	528,000	33.2

=== Polling ===
On Question 4

Poll source	Date(s) administered	Sample size (Note: Key: A – all adults RV – registered voters LV – likely voters V – unclear)	Margin of error	Yes	No	Other	Undecided
OpinionWorks	October 20–23, 2022	989 (LV)	± 3.1%	63%	25%	–	12%
University of Maryland	September 22–27, 2022	810 (RV)	± 4.0%	73%	23%	–	4%
Victoria Research (Note: This poll was sponsored the Yes on 4 Campaign, which supports Question 4)	September 11–19, 2022	762 (RV)	± 3.7%	69%	20%	2% (Note: "Usually skip/Might skip" with 2%)	8%
Goucher College	September 8–12, 2022	748 (LV)	± 3.6%	59%	34%	–	7%

On whether recreational marijuana should be legal

Poll source	Date(s) administered	Sample size	Margin of error	Yes	No	Other	Undecided
Goucher College	March 1–6, 2022	635 (A)	± 3.9%	62%	34%	1% (Note: "Refused" with 1%)	3%
Goucher College	October 14–20, 2021	700 (A)	± 3.7%	60%	33%	3% (Note: "Refused" with 3%)	4%
Gonzales Research (D) (Note: This poll was sponsored by Douglas J. J. Peters)	May 17–22, 2021	301 (LV) (Note: 301 likely Democratic primary voters)	± 5.8%	69%	24%	7% (Note: "Refused" with 7%)	–
Goucher College	February 23–28, 2021	725 (A)	± 3.6%	67%	28%	1% (Note: "Refused" with 1%)	4%

Question 1 Results by county Yes: 80–90%; 70–80%; 60–70%

Question 2 Results by county Yes: 90–100%; 80–90%

Question 3 Results by county Yes: 60–70%; 50–60%

Question 4 Results by county Yes: 70–80%; 60–70%; 50–60%; No: 50–60%

Question 5 Results by county Yes: 70–80%; 60–70%; 50–60%

== See also ==
- Political party strength in Maryland
- Elections in Maryland

== Notes ==
Partisan clients
