= Lancaster Farming =

Newspaper in the United States of America

- Type: Weekly farm newspaper
- Owner: Steinman Communications
- Publisher: Steinman Communications
- President: Justin Bucks
- Editor: Stephen Seeber
- Founded: 1955
- Language: English
- Headquarters: Ephrata, Pennsylvania
- Circulation: 53,000
- Website: www.lancasterfarming.com

Lancaster Farming is the leading regional farm newspaper for the Northeastern and Mid-Atlantic United States.

== Description ==
Lancaster Farming has published weekly on Saturday since 1955. Paid circulation is about 53,000.

Lancaster Farming provides news, market and commodity reports, and agribusiness information and includes news about 4-H, FFA and fair events, and rural life. In addition, many subscribers get farm newspapers for the advertising of specials on parts and supplies, used implements, and auctions of land, and equipment, and livestock.

Lancaster Farming is printed in four to five sections, averaging about 200 pages per issue. Section A is devoted to breaking news, dairy and beef news, commodity market reports, and upcoming events. Section B is the family section which includes recipes, food and nutrition, antiques, and organizations such as 4-H, FFA and the Grange. Sections C and D have business news, new product information and updates, and other agribusiness information. Numerous special sections published throughout the year cover topics such as the dairy industry, horses and renewable energy. Section E is devoted to special segments of agriculture with such titles as Mid-Atlantic Horse, Eastern Dairy Reporter, Ag Technology, etc.

== Archive ==
Lancaster Farming 1955–2003 is available online through The Pennsylvania State University Libraries' Digital Newspapers Program. The Pennsylvania State University Libraries are also spearheading a collaborative effort in Pennsylvania to develop the Pennsylvania Newspaper Archive (PANA). Lancaster Farming, as a significant historical Pennsylvania newspaper, is included from initial publication in November 1955 until December 2003.
