= Dan Cox =

American politician (born 1974)

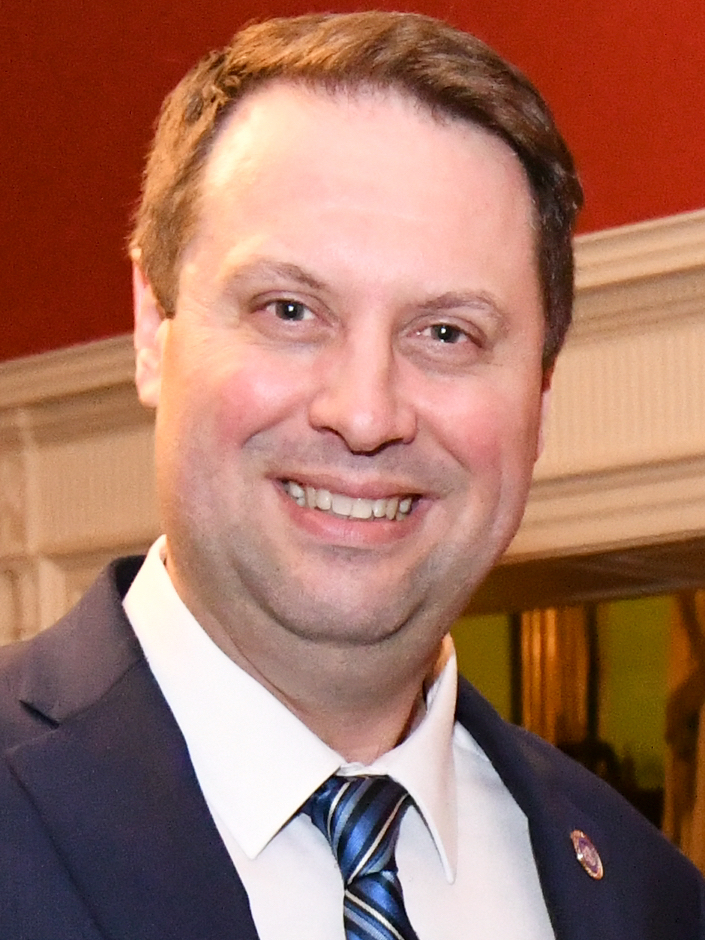
- Cox in 2020

Member of the Maryland House of Delegates from the 4th district
- In office January 9, 2019 – January 11, 2023 Serving with Barrie Ciliberti and Jesse Pippy
- Preceded by: David E. Vogt III
- Succeeded by: April Fleming Miller

Personal details
- Born: Daniel Lewis Cox; August 9, 1974 (age 52) Washington, D.C., U.S.
- Party: Republican
- Spouse: Valerie Gilliard (m. 1996)
- Children: 10
- Education: Mount St. Mary's University (attended); University of Maryland, University College (BS); Regent University (JD)
- Website: Campaign website

Daniel Lewis Cox (born August 9, 1974) is an American politician and lawyer, and perennial candidate. He was a Republican member of the Maryland House of Delegates, representing the fourth district from 2019 to 2023.

Cox was the unsuccessful Republican nominee in the 2022 Maryland gubernatorial election, in which he lost to nonprofit executive Wes Moore. In 2024, Cox unsuccessfully ran for the U.S. House of Representatives in Maryland's 6th congressional district, losing to former state delegate Neil Parrott in the Republican primary election. Cox was the Republican nominee for governor in the 2026 Maryland gubernatorial election, in which he again lost to Moore.

Cox is characterized as a far-right politician. An election denier, he has continuously espoused the theory that the 2020 U.S. presidential election was fraudulent.

== Early life and education ==
Cox was born in Washington, D.C., on August 9, 1974, as one of ten children to Gary Cox. His father was a pastor. His father named him after the biblical prophet, Daniel. Cox initially lived in Takoma Park, Maryland, but his family moved north to Frederick County after his father took a job there as a minister. Cox grew up on a farm near Taneytown, Maryland.

Cox attended the Wellspring Christian Family Schools, a faith-based home-school organization founded by his father, as a child. He attended Mount St. Mary's University from 1992 to 1995 and later attended the University of Maryland Global Campus, where in 2002 he earned a bachelor's degree in government and politics. He attended Regent University School of Law, earning a J.D. degree with distinction in 2006.

== Career ==
In 2006, he became a member of the Maryland State Bar Association and was a sole practitioner outside of Emmitsburg, Maryland. Cox was also a member of the Alliance Defending Freedom.

Before getting involved with Maryland politics, Cox taught as a high school teacher from 1995 to 2005 at Walkersville Christian Family Schools. He also served as a Captain in the Civil Air Patrol.

== Political involvement ==
Cox says he has been active in politics since 1980, when he campaigned with his parents for Ronald Reagan. He also worked on the 1996 presidential campaign of Alan Keyes and as an aide to former U.S. Representative Roscoe Bartlett. He was the Republican nominee for Dorchester County Circuit Court Clerk in 2006, losing the race to Democratic nominee Michael L. Baker. Cox ran on a platform that included establishing a division to help fathers gain visitation, ensuring mothers received child support, and refusing to issue licenses for same-sex marriages, which were not legal in Maryland at the time. From 2007 to 2009, he was the President of the Town Commission of Secretary, Maryland.

=== 2016 congressional campaign ===
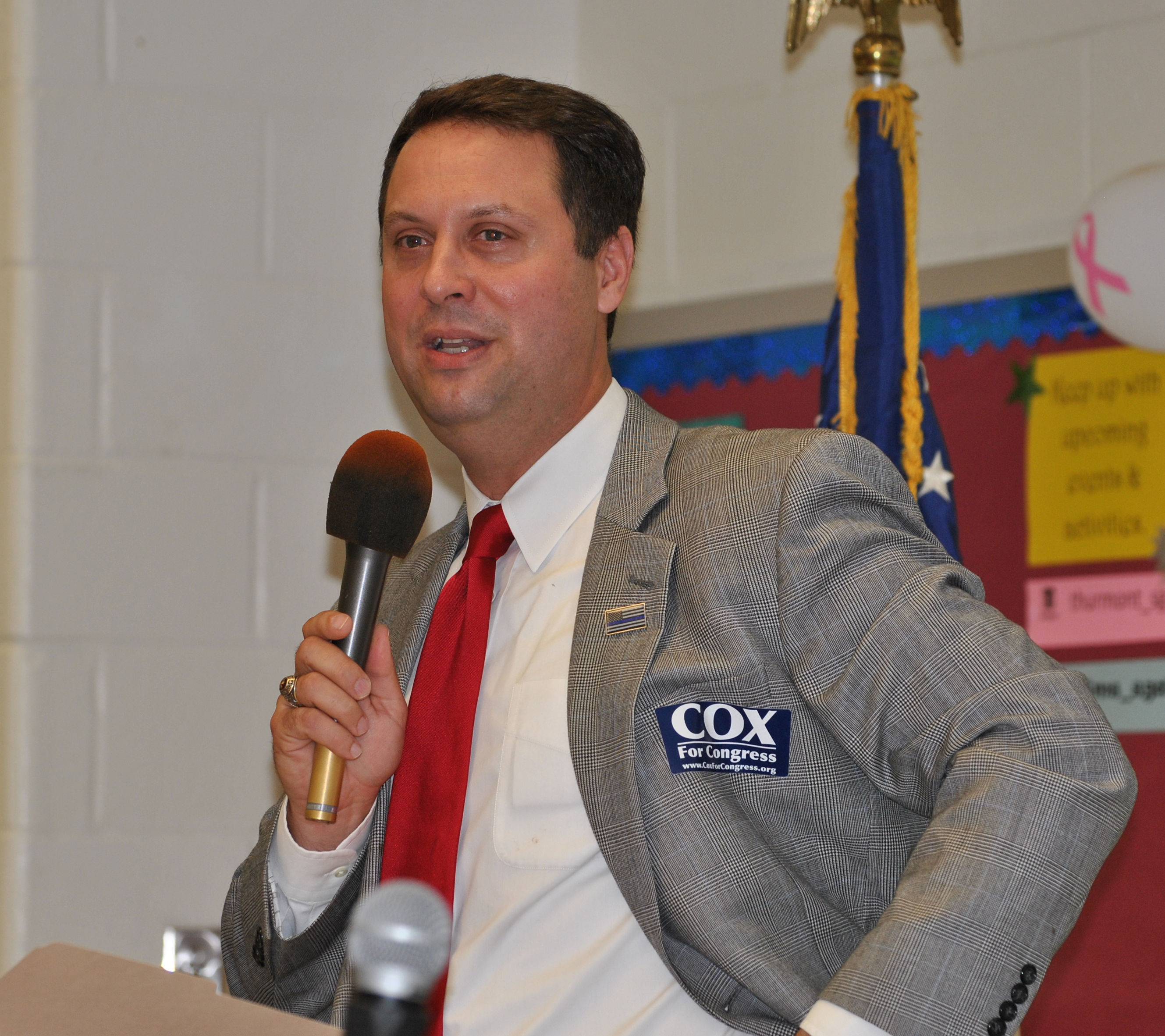
Cox speaking at a debate, 2016

On February 1, 2016, Cox filed to run in 2016 in Maryland's 8th congressional district.

During the Republican primary, Cox was described as being the most conservative candidate in the Republican primary race. He campaigned on imposing a 10 percent flat tax for incomes over $36,000 and eliminating payroll taxes, strengthening gun ownership rights, abolishing the Internal Revenue Service, and reducing funding and programs for the departments of Commerce, Education, Energy, and Housing and Urban Development. He supported Ted Cruz in the 2016 Republican Party presidential primaries. Cox pledged to join the Freedom Caucus, a group of tea party supporters, if elected.

In September 2016, Cox claimed that "far-left sign Nazis" were stealing campaign signs he posted alongside state highways, and posted on Twitter that he had urinated on the signs as a deterrent to prevent theft.

Cox won the Republican primary with 44.4 percent of the vote. In the general election, he was defeated by Democratic nominee and state senator Jamie Raskin with 34.2 percent of the vote.

=== Maryland House of Delegates ===
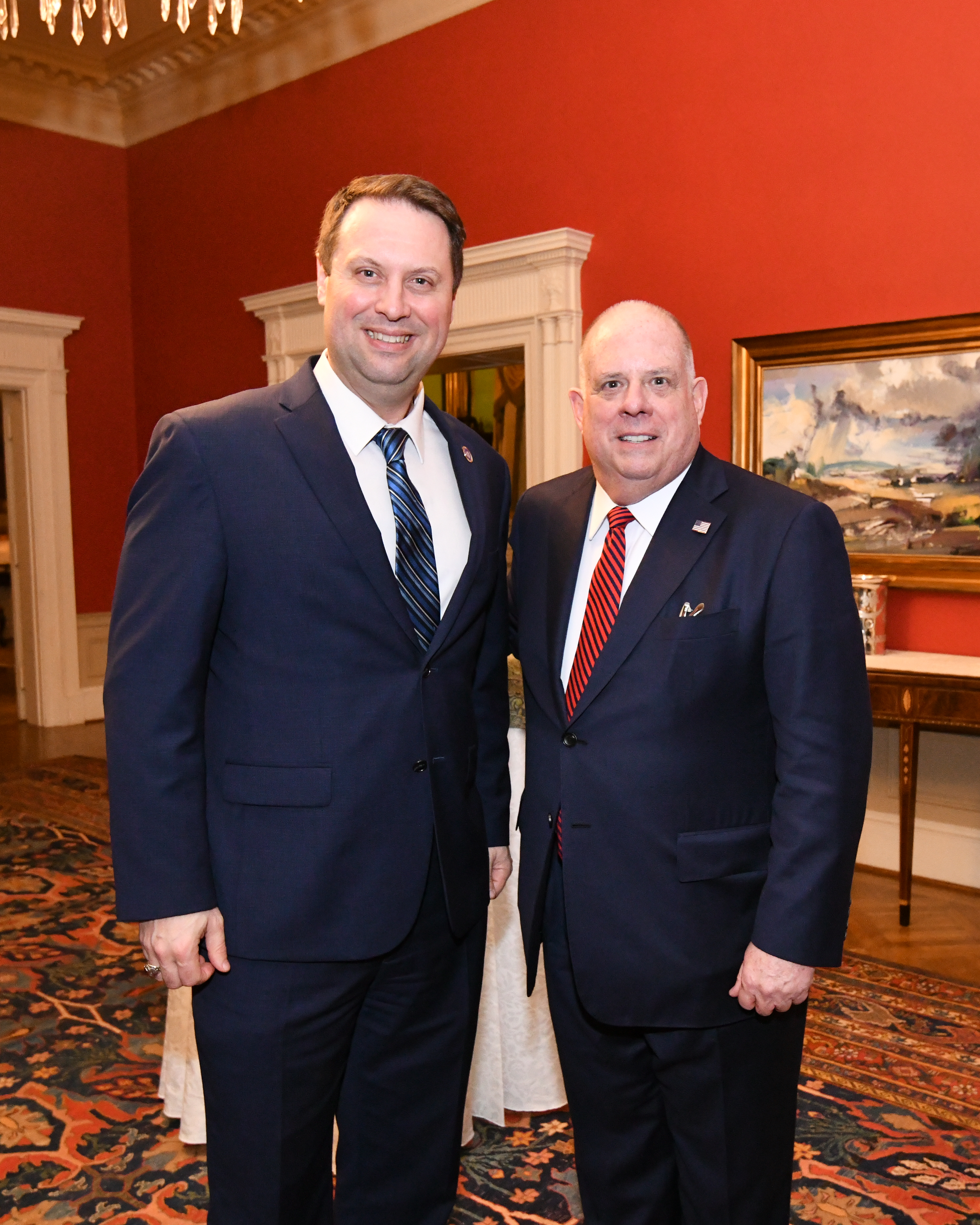
Cox with Governor Larry Hogan, who declined to endorse Cox during the 2022 Maryland gubernatorial election.

In February 2018, Cox announced that he would run for the Maryland House of Delegates in District 4. He ran on a platform that included cutting regulations, increasing immigration enforcement, and supporting gun rights. He campaigned on a platform that included lowering taxes, expanding Interstate 270, and supporting charter schools. In November 2018, electioneering complaints were filed against Cox after he recorded a video of himself within 100 feet of an early voting center in Thurmont, which is prohibited by Maryland election law.

Cox was sworn into the Maryland House of Delegates on January 9, 2019. He was a member of the Judiciary Committee, serving on its family law and public safety subcommittees from 2019 to 2020 and its family and juvenile law and civil law and procedure subcommittees from 2021 to 2023. In his first term, Cox filed 84 bills, only two of which passed (both of which were introduced in 2019), and attached amendments to others.

From 2018 to 2021, Cox served as the secretary of the Frederick County Republican Central Committee. During the 2020 United States presidential election, he served as a Frederick County co-chair for the state's Trump Victory Leadership County team.

=== Involvement in the January 6 United States Capitol attack ===
In November 2020, Cox said that he was part of a Republican legal team observing the count of mail-in ballots in Philadelphia during the 2020 United States presidential election. After Donald Trump lost the 2020 presidential election, Cox has repeatedly endorsed Trump's false claims of a stolen election and called for a "forensic audit" of the 2020 election results, later calling for an audit of the 2020 elections in Maryland.

Cox helped arrange for buses to take constituents to the "Save America March" in Washington, D.C., on January 6, 2021; the rally preceded the violent attack on the U.S. Capitol. During the rally, Cox sent a tweet disparaging Vice President Mike Pence, writing "Pence is a traitor." After receiving backlash, Cox tweeted and retweeted false claims blaming antifa for the attack on the Capitol, and expressed his support for Enrique Tarrio, the leader of the Proud Boys, an extremist group with nationalist, neofascist and self-proclaimed Western-chauvinist views. Cox later said in June 2022 that his Twitter post was "his way of expressing his disappointment and not a personal attack on the vice president." After his win in the Republican gubernatorial primary, Cox denied organizing buses for the rally.

The Frederick County Democratic Central Committee began a letter-writing campaign calling for Cox to be expelled from the House of Delegates for his false claims. Two days later Cox issued a statement denouncing "all mob violence including those who broke into the U.S. Capitol." In the statement Cox said he had attended the rally, but was not involved in the storming of the Capitol. Governor Larry Hogan and Steven Clark, the chairman of the Frederick County Republican Central Committee, denounced Cox's comments, and delegate Kathleen Dumais, the co-chair of the House Joint Committee on Legislative Ethics, said that the committee received some inquiries about Cox's tweets.

In February 2022, representatives from Our Revolution and other progressive groups urged the Maryland State Board of Elections to consider blocking Cox from the ballot for his participation in the Capitol attack, citing Section 3 of the 14th Amendment to the United States Constitution. In May 2022, a lawsuit was filed against Maryland Elections Administrator Linda Lamone, seeking to remove Cox from the 2022 Republican primary ballot for his presence during the Capitol attack. Anne Arundel County circuit court judge Mark W. Crooks dismissed the case on May 20, 2022.

During his 2026 gubernatorial campaign, when asked if he had any regrets for his actions during the 2020 presidential election and January 6 U.S. Capitol attack, Cox said that he regretted tweeting.

=== 2022 Maryland gubernatorial campaign ===
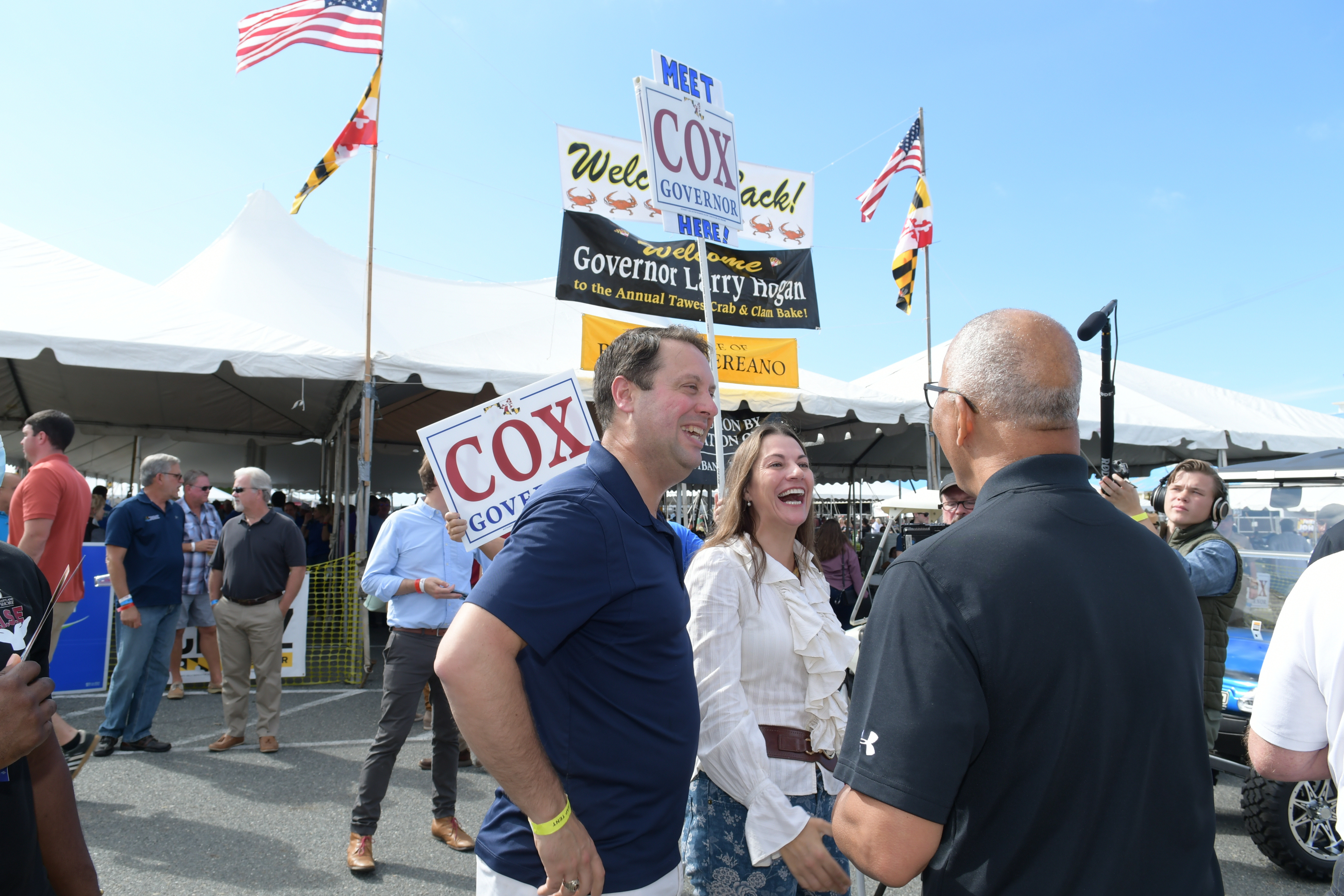
Cox and Schifanelli at the J. Millard Tawes Crab and Clam Bake with Lieutenant Governor Boyd Rutherford in October 2021.

In late June 2021, Cox filed paperwork to run for governor in 2022, and formally announced his candidacy on July 4, 2021. He launched his campaign with a campaign rally in Cambridge on August 6, 2021. He picked Gordana Schifanelli, an Eastern Shore lawyer, as his running mate. On November 22, 2021, Cox received the endorsement of former president Donald Trump.

Ahead of the primary election, Cox threatened lawsuits seeking to invalidate mail-in ballots. Some political observers said before the primary that Cox would have publicly doubted the results if he had lost to Kelly Schulz.

External videos
- DGA Action Ad - Meet Dan via YouTube

As polls showed Cox and Schulz running neck-and-neck in polls, the Democratic Governors Association spent $1 million for a television advertisement promoting Cox, hoping he would win the nomination and be easier for Democrats to defeat in November. Cox denied receiving any support from the DGA, saying that he had "nothing to do with the ad purchase". Some observers, including strategist Jim Dornan, say that two factors—Trump's endorsement and the DGA ad blitz—allowed Cox to advance to the general election. Other observers, including former Maryland lieutenant governor and Republican National Committee chair Michael Steele, say the ads had little impact on voters, highlighting that far-right politician and neo-Confederate activist Michael Peroutka had won the Attorney General primary on the same ballot by an almost identical margin to Cox, even though the DGA did not run any ads on his behalf.

Cox won the Republican primary on July 19, 2022, defeating Schulz with 52.0 percent of the vote. If elected, he would have been the first governor from Frederick County since Enoch Louis Lowe. At his victory party, Cox took photos with and accepted a gift from a young man who introduced himself as a member of the Maryland Proud Boys. The footage of this encounter, which was uploaded to Cox's Vimeo account, was deleted after The Washington Post contacted the Cox campaign, which responded with a statement denying an association with the young man.

Following his primary win, Cox sought to distance himself from the January 6 insurrection and former president Donald Trump, removing references to his endorsement from his website and making adjustments to his biography and issues pages. He also deactivated his account on Gab, a website that has been described as a social media haven for white supremacists and neo-Nazis and was used by the perpetrator of the Pittsburgh synagogue shooting, on which he had more than 1,000 posts. Republican leaders expressed concern that Cox's primary victory would hurt their candidates downballot, with Senate minority leader Bryan Simonaire refusing to endorse or campaign with Cox and House minority leader Jason C. Buckel saying that Cox would need to moderate his views for the party to make gains. The Maryland Republican Party would end up losing two seats in the state Senate and three seats in the House of Delegates in the 2022 elections.

Cox was defeated by Democratic nominee Wes Moore in the general election on November 8, 2022. He initially declined to concede after the election was called for Moore by various national news outlets, believing that there was still a path to victory, but called Moore the next day to concede the election.

Following Cox's defeat, his running mate Gordana Schifanelli filed to run for Chair of the Maryland Republican Party, seeking to succeed retiring chairman Dirk Haire, but was blocked from running because she filed an hour after the candidacy deadline. Schifanelli later said that Cox blamed her for their loss and that the running mates rarely spoke to each other during the campaign, with their relationship souring well before the general election. Cox disputed this claim, telling The Washington Post, "I never blamed Ms. Schifanelli for our election loss. Her comments are false and sadly self-serving." Cox later endorsed Nicole Beus Harris, a political consultant and the wife of U.S. Representative Andy Harris, as the next chair of the Maryland Republican Party.

==== Mail-in ballots lawsuit ====
In August 2022, Cox said he opposed a lawsuit filed by the Maryland State Board of Elections to allow officials to count mail-in ballots ahead of Election Day, calling it unconstitutional. According to the National Conference of State Legislatures, Maryland is the only state that restricts the processing of absentee ballots until after Election Day.

In September 2022 court papers and a hearing, Cox argued that the board lacked the authority to begin tabulating ballots before election day. On September 23, 2022, a Montgomery County Circuit Court judge ruled in favor of the board, allowing it to begin counting mail-in ballots on October 1. Cox appealed to the Appellate Court of Maryland, which denied his request to halt the counting of mail-in ballots. In October 7, 2022, Maryland's highest court unanimously rejected a further appeal from Cox. In an opinion written by Chief Justice Matthew J. Fader in March 2023, the court held that a section of the state's Election Law Article referenced in his lawsuit did not "violate the separation of powers guaranteed in the Maryland Constitution's Declaration of Rights". In February 2023, the U.S. Supreme Court declined to hear Cox's challenge, letting the ruling stand without comment.

Cox did not commit to accepting the results of the election with mail-in ballots being counted early. During a debate on October 12, Cox was non-committal when asked if he would accept the results of the election: "I have always accepted the election results that are fair and that are following the Constitution. At this point, it would be similar to saying that before a surgery takes place to decide whether or not the surgery went well". Ahead of the election, Cox called on his supporters to "monitor" the state's election drop boxes, alleging without evidence that the drop boxes were "regularly misused and stuffed with nefarious ballots".

=== Post-legislative career ===
After being defeated in the 2022 Maryland gubernatorial election, Cox returned to private practice in Frederick County, Maryland. In February 2023, Pennsylvania state senator Doug Mastriano hired Cox as his chief of staff. Cox also started a podcast titled It's Your Freedom!, with the first episode premiering on Facebook on February 7. Cox resigned as Mastriano's chief of staff in November 2023.

Also in February 2023, Wicomico County executive Julie Giordano nominated Cox to serve as special counsel for the county. Cox was scheduled to join the county council meeting to discuss any questions and concerns councilmembers had about his nomination, but was not present during the session. The Wicomico County Council voted 6–1 to reject Cox's nomination.

In April 2023, Cox was hired by Robert Krop, a local firearms business owner who alongside Frederick County Sheriff Chuck Jenkins was charged by federal prosecutors with conspiracy and making false statements to acquire machine guns, to represent him in his federal trial. In June 2023, Judge Stephanie A. Gallagher denied a motion to dismiss the charges against Krop, in which Cox alleged that the indictment was "politically motivated" and questioned the Ukrainian citizenship of the lead ATF agent in the case. Jenkins' attorneys also criticized Cox's motion, saying that he was employing "inconsistent, even hostile, defense strategies" and asking to be tried separately from Krop, which was granted on August 31, 2023. Gallagher dismissed the federal indictment against Krop in May 2024, stating that his right to a speedy trial was violated; federal prosecutors filed new indictments against Krop later that month. Krop was acquitted on all counts in October 2024.

In May 2024, following the jury's guilty verdict in the Trump hush money trial, Cox called on the Maryland Republican Party to censure former governor Larry Hogan for calling on elected officials to not "pour fuel on the fire with more toxic partisanship" amid the ruling. In November 2024, after Trump won the 2024 presidential election, Cox told The Daily Record that he was being considered for U.S. Attorney for the District of Maryland. If appointed to the seat and confirmed by the U.S. Senate, Cox told The Baltimore Sun that his priorities would include prosecuting sex trafficking and criminal gangs, such as MS-13, and ensuring Maryland elections are transparent.

=== 2024 congressional campaign ===
In May 2023, Cox said he was considering a run for Congress in Maryland's 6th congressional district in 2024, seeking to succeed outgoing U.S. Representative David Trone. On July 3, 2023, someone filed paperwork with the Federal Election Commission to enter Cox into the 2024 election, which prompted him to report the filing to the FEC for fraud. According to a Daily Beast investigation, it was Cox's campaign treasurer, Tom Datwyler, who filed the FEC paperwork on his behalf after creating fundraising ads on WinRed for Cox's congressional campaign. Datwyler was told by Cox advisor Rory McShane to terminate the FEC filing the next day, saying that Cox had decided against running in 2024.

Despite these emails, Cox announced that he would run for Congress on October 30, 2023. Cox was seen as a frontrunner, alongside former state delegate Neil Parrott, in the Republican primary, during which he sought to associate himself with former president Donald Trump, calling the ongoing criminal cases against Trump a "witch hunt" and continuing to promote disproven conspiracy theories that the 2020 presidential election was marred by fraud, and ran on a platform including immigration, crime, and opposing COVID-19 pandemic health restrictions. Cox struggled to build a coalition of voters without the outside support he received during his 2022 gubernatorial campaign and was defeated in the Republican primary election on May 14, 2024, placing second behind Parrott with 30.1 percent of the vote.

=== 2026 Maryland gubernatorial election ===
In January 2026, Cox announced that he would again run for governor of Maryland in 2026, challenging Democratic incumbent Wes Moore. His running mate is Robert Krop, a firearms business owner from Frederick County. During the Republican primary, he ran on a platform of tax cuts and increases to local government aid, housing affordability, and in-state energy generation.

Cox was viewed as a frontrunner in the Republican primary alongside businessman Ed Hale, who Cox criticized for switching parties in summer 2025 to run for governor in the Republican primary. In June 2026, the Maryland Democratic Party and Governor Moore began sending out mailers to Republican primary voters and airing advertisements promoting Cox over Hale. Cox and Hale condemned the spending, with Cox calling the Democrats' efforts "exactly what unpopular governors like Wes Moore do to distract from his disastrous policies". Cox won the Republican primary election on June 23, 2026, defeating Hale with 43.3 percent of the vote.

During the general election, Cox says he will campaign on lowering taxes, restoring in-state energy production, and increasing parental involvement in public schools. He is also expected to rally against Moore's handling of economic issues, the Francis Scott Key Bridge replacement, and his military record. Cox also sought to distance himself from the positions he took during his 2022 gubernatorial campaign as well as President Donald Trump amid Democratic efforts to remind voters of Trump's endorsement of Cox in 2022, saying that he did not "have an association or affiliation with the President" and would not be seeking his endorsement in the 2026 election, and that Joe Biden "probably" won the 2020 United States presidential election.

Cox was defeated by Moore in the general election on November 3, 2026.

== Political views and statements ==
=== Abortion ===
Cox identifies as pro-life. In 2019, NARAL Pro-Choice Maryland, which supports the right to an abortion, gave Cox a 73% score. Maryland Right to Life, which opposes abortion rights, gave Cox a 92% score during his first term in the Maryland House of Delegates.

During the 2019 legislative session, Cox was one of fourteen state delegates to vote against the state budget, citing the defeat of an amendment blocking state funding for abortions.

In February 2021, Cox joined delegates Kathy Szeliga and Sid Saab at a protest against abortion at the Maryland State House. During his first term in the legislature, Cox introduced fourteen bills that would restrict abortion access and offered budget amendments to remove state funding for the procedure. He also cosponsored several bills that would prohibit abortions if a fetal heartbeat is detected, including the Maryland Fetal Heartbeat Protection Act (HB 1195).

In June 2022, Cox praised the Supreme Court's ruling in Dobbs v. Jackson Women's Health Organization, which overturned Roe v. Wade and Planned Parenthood v. Casey. During his 2022 gubernatorial campaign, Cox said that he would end taxpayer funding through Medicaid for abortions and opposed using taxpayer funding to provide contraception options for college students or to women traveling from other states to obtain abortion services in Maryland. Cox declined to say whether he would support federal restrictions on abortions, including a bill introduced by Senator Lindsey Graham that would ban abortions after 15 weeks of pregnancy. During a debate on October 12, 2022, Cox said that he supported exceptions for rape, incest, or for the life of the mother.

=== Climate change and the environment ===
Cox rejects the scientific consensus on climate change and opposes tax subsidies for clean energy programs. He voted against the Climate Solutions Now Act of 2021 (SB 414), a proposed climate bill that would have included a goal to reduce greenhouse gas emissions to a level that is 50 percent lower than it was in 2006 by 2030. He voted against the bill when it was re-introduced in the 2022 legislative session.

During the 2019 legislative session, Cox said he opposed a bill to ban the pesticide chlorpyrifos.

During the 2020 legislative session, Cox supported legislation that would provide a sales tax exemption for data center equipment. During his 2026 gubernatorial campaign, he supported imposing a new "data center electric tax" on data centers, banning data center development in Maryland, and imposing a data center moratorium if elected governor.

In September 2022, Cox said he would support repealing the state's ban on fracking.

In October 2022, Cox told Lancaster Farming that he supported efforts to clean up the Chesapeake Bay. Cox said he considered reducing effluent from bay area sewage systems and ending silt pouring from the Conowingo Dam to be a "top priority".

During his 2026 gubernatorial campaign, Cox supported prioritizing funding for clean energy projects in Maryland, but opposed offshore wind farms and the Maryland Piedmont Reliability Project. He supported modernizing sewage and stormwater systems to protect the Chesapeake Bay, but hoped to do it in a way that "doesn't crush the farmers, and that also preserves our Bay".

=== COVID-19 pandemic ===
In April 2020, Cox posted a portion of the state constitution on his Facebook page after Maryland governor Larry Hogan issued an executive order implementing a stay-at-home directive. He later challenged the legality of Hogan's statewide mask mandate. Cox claimed in the court filing that he was threatened with arrest by Hogan's advisers if he attended and spoke at a rally protesting the stay-at-home orders; Hogan spokesperson rebutted with, "We fully respect Delegate Cox's right to protest and express his feelings, but that doesn't entitle him to make false and baseless claims." U.S. District Court Judge Catherine Blake struck down his lawsuit on May 20, 2020, saying that the state and country are "now in the grip of a public health crisis more severe than any seen for a hundred years." He withdrew his request for a temporary restraining order on July 20, 2020. Blake again rejected another lawsuit against COVID-19 restrictions filed by Cox in November 2020. In December 2020, Montgomery County Circuit Court Judge James Bonifant rejected a request made by local restaurants represented by Cox and attorney Ed Hartman to reverse an executive order issued by County Executive Marc Elrich that prohibited indoor dining at restaurants.

In May 2020, Cox attended a rally in Annapolis which protested Hogan's stay-at-home orders alongside delegates Warren E. Miller and Brian Chisholm, former delegate Deb Rey, 7th congressional district special election candidate Liz Matory, 2nd congressional district candidate Tim Fazenbaker, #WalkAway founder Brandon Straka, and 2022 gubernatorial candidate and perennial candidate Robin Ficker. Later in the month, Cox posted a tweet promoting a conspiracy theory linking the Bill and Melinda Gates Foundation to the coronavirus pandemic.

In October 2020, Cox provided legal representation for a Harford County man who was arrested for not wearing a mask at a polling place, arguing that the pair were only ordered to wear masks once they were inside the facility and election staff learned that they were Republicans. The family's request for a temporary restraining order to allow them to vote without wearing masks was rejected by Harford County Circuit Judge Angela M. Eaves.

In January 2021, Cox cosponsored the Consent of the Governed Act, which would remove the governor's ability to unilaterally declare a state of emergency and would require the governor to form a special session to extend any state of emergency declaration for longer than fourteen days, which would require two-thirds approval from both chambers of the Maryland General Assembly. In February 2021, Cox proposed a resolution that would immediately end Hogan's coronavirus emergency declaration. In March 2021, he introduced a bill that would ban any requirement to show proof of "a medical examination, a vaccination, a medical test, or any other medical information" for employment or travel, and would allow parents to object to a child's vaccination as a requirement to be admitted to a public school.

In June 2021, Cox called on Hogan to end the state's coronavirus emergency declaration. In August 2021, Cox used his Facebook page to ask his constituents to e-mail the Maryland Board of Education to demand that they reject an emergency universal masking mandate regulation for the 2021–2022 academic year.

Cox claims to have survived COVID-19 twice, saying that during one of his bouts with the virus, he took hydroxychloroquine and ivermectin he obtained in Florida. Currently, ivermectin is used to treat parasites in livestock and river blindness in humans. It is of no benefit in preventing or treating COVID-19.

In January 2022, Cox attended a rally against vaccine mandates in Annapolis, Maryland. In September 2022, Cox said that he was "pro-vaccine" but does not believe in mandates.

In February 2022, Cox introduced articles of impeachment against Governor Larry Hogan for his handling of the COVID-19 pandemic. It was the first serious effort to impeach a Maryland governor in the state's history. The Maryland House Rules and Executive Nominations Committee voted unanimously to reject the articles of impeachment.

=== Crime and policing ===
During the 2019 legislative session, Cox introduced a bill to create a task force to study the history of criminal and civil classifications in Maryland. He also supported a bill that would require people convicted of a violent crime to register information and a photo with the state, and opposed a bill prohibiting people convicted of animal abuse from adopting or buying another pet.

In June 2022, Cox released a crime plan on Truth Social that called for allowing "modified stop and frisk" policies and enacting broken windows policing. In July, after a squeegee worker fatally shot a driver wielding a baseball bat, he posted on the conservative social media platform Gettr that he would "target an end of squeegee crimes and all crime no matter how small" and pledged to remove Marilyn Mosby as Baltimore State's Attorney. Cox has expressed interest in establishing a "prosecutorial board" to work with elected leaders in Baltimore and other crime-challenged areas to keep violent criminals in prisons. He also said he was open to using a receivership to take control of Baltimore to help combat rising crime. In an interview with DC News Now, Cox said he would provide law enforcement officers with qualified immunity protections along with increased pay.

Following the August 8, 2022 FBI search of Mar-a-Lago, Cox said on social media that he would use the Maryland State Police and Maryland National Guard to "stand against" the federal government. He also compared the FBI search to the actions of the Stasi, East Germany's secret police. At a campaign rally later that month, Cox said he opposed attacks on law enforcement officers, saying, "It's the politicians that matter. It's not the law enforcement. It's the orders from the politicians. We have to make sure we're not threatening the law enforcement officers. It's the politicians who are giving the orders. It's the politicians who have to go."

During his 2026 gubernatorial campaign, Cox supported banning no-knock warrants, citing the Fourth Amendment to the United States Constitution.

=== Education ===
As a state delegate, Cox was a vocal critic of the Blueprint for Maryland's Future, a sweeping education reform package passed by the Maryland General Assembly in 2021. During the 2022 legislative session, Cox introduced the Maryland Parent Rights Act (HB0618), a bill that would have allowed parents a larger role in their kids' education including notifying them when curriculum changes had been made. The bill failed to pass out of committee. He also voted in favor of an amendment introduced by state Delegate Kathy Szeliga that would have blocked public schools from discussing gender and sexuality in the classroom.

During his 2022 gubernatorial campaign, Cox unveiled a "Defending Parental Rights" education platform that would ban teaching children in kindergarten through third grade about gender identity, calling it "indoctrination." When asked to elaborate his definition of indoctrination, he cited asexual and nonbinary author Maia Kobabe's memoirs Gender Queer, which he claimed depicts "things that I cannot show you on television, it's so disgusting." Kobabe's book is not being taught in any kindergarten or elementary school classes. He's also called for a ban on critical race theory, which is not taught in Maryland public schools, and supports the expansion of school choice by increasing funding for the state's BOOST program, which provides low-income families with scholarships to attend charter schools. In September 2022, Cox said he would appoint more parents to the Maryland State Board of Education. In October 2022, Cox promised to create an office for parents' rights on his first day in office and said that he supported mandating agriculture education in schools. During his 2026 gubernatorial campaign, Cox declined to say whether he believed kindergartners were subject to indoctrination in public schools regarding gender policy.

During his 2026 gubernatorial election, Cox supported conducting an independent financial audit of Maryland's public education system. He also supported increasing parental involvement in public education and placing accountability measures on the Blueprint for Maryland's Future.

=== Gun policy ===
In February 2018, following the Parkland high school shooting, Cox said he opposed laws that ban assault weapons and restrict gun ownership, instead endorsing legislation to arm teachers and school resource officers.

In 2019, Cox said he opposed a bill to abolish the state's Handgun Permit Review Board.

During the 2022 legislative session, Cox opposed a bill that would ban the possession and sale of privately made firearms, which he compared to the 2022 Russian invasion of Ukraine. He also voted against legislation that would increase security measures at firearms stores. In June 2022, Cox celebrated the Supreme Court's ruling in New York State Rifle & Pistol Association, Inc. v. Bruen.

=== Healthcare ===
During his 2016 House of Representatives campaign, Cox said that he would move to scrap the Affordable Care Act if elected.

During the 2019 legislative session, Cox voted against the End-of-Life Option Act, which would have provided palliative care to terminally ill adults.

On Holocaust Remembrance Day in April 2021, Cox said he would vote against a bill to allow minors to consent to some health care services, comparing it to the infringement of "the rights of parents" by Nazis. Cox's Nazi analogies were criticized by the local Jewish Community Relations Council. Cox defended his remarks in a letter accusing his colleagues of twisting the words he used during an emotionally-charged floor debate to gain partisan advantage, and offered no apology for his comments.

=== Immigration ===
During his 2016 House of Representatives campaign, Cox strongly rallied on regulating immigration. He said that he would support the full enforcement of existing laws and passage of Kate's Law, which would establish mandatory minimum five-year prison sentences for any immigrant convicted of reentering the country after being deported.

Cox opposed HB892, a bill that would require a warrant in order for the U.S. Immigration and Customs Enforcement to search through the state's driver's license database. He also opposed the Maryland Highway Safety Act of 2013, which allowed undocumented immigrants to apply for driver's licenses.

Cox strongly opposed the Dignity Not Detention Act, which would have required people arrested for federal civil crimes to be detained in federal facilities rather than in state or local facilities. During the House debate before the bill's final vote, Cox read off a list of offenses that local law enforcement agencies would not be able to use to pass undocumented people over to ICE after they completed sentences for their crimes. The bill passed the Maryland General Assembly with a veto-proof majority, but was vetoed by Governor Hogan on May 27, 2021.

=== Marijuana ===
In 2021, Cox voted against a bill to decriminalize the possession of drug paraphernalia. In 2022, Cox voted against legislation that would create a ballot referendum to legalize recreational marijuana in Maryland, and another bill that would regulate marijuana possession should the referendum pass in November. During a debate on October 12, 2022, Cox said that he supported the release of those charged with the possession of small amounts of marijuana.

=== QAnon ===
In October 2020, Cox made a post on his Twitter account that contained hashtags related to the QAnon conspiracy theory.

In April 2022, Cox attended "Patriots Arise for God and Country" conference in Gettysburg, Pennsylvania. The event was organized by QAnon conspiracy theorists Francine and Allen Fodsick and featured images of conspiracy theories related to the September 11 attacks, the assassination of John F. Kennedy, and vaccines.

In June 2022, Cox ambushed a rally for gubernatorial candidate Kelly Schulz, where Governor Larry Hogan called him a "QAnon conspiracy theorist". In response, Cox yelled out, "Defamation, sir!" When asked to elaborate on how he had been defamed, Cox said that he was not a member of QAnon. In October 2022, when asked by WJZ-TV if he believed in any of QAnon's beliefs, Cox replied, "Absolutely not. I'm disavowing all of that. This is just a lie."

=== Social issues ===
In April 2001, Cox and his wife Valerie wrote a letter to The Dorchester Star about the state's Administration Act of 2001 (SB 205), which would ban discrimination against people based on their sexual identity. In the letter, they argued that the bill would violate the rights of "business owners ... who firmly believe homosexuality is sin and those who practice it are in danger of temporal disease and eternal death."

During his 2016 House of Representatives campaign, Cox said that he did not support an increase in the minimum wage. During the 2019 legislative session, he testified against a bill to raise Maryland's minimum wage to $15 an hour.

In August 2017, Cox served as the attorney in a lawsuit challenging the Frederick County Public School's policy on transgender students. The plaintiffs dropped the lawsuit on November 28, 2017, citing stress and potential humiliation that stemmed from the legal action. In July 2022, Cox said that he would ban transgender students from competing on girls' sports team in schools.

In September 2018, Cox disputed the sexual assault accusations made against Supreme Court nominee Brett Kavanaugh, claiming that his accusers "withheld evidence" from the confirmation hearing.

In September 2019, Cox introduced a bill to add "dignity of the human body" to the state's hate crime statute to cover spitting on the victim. The bill was named for John Weed, a Frederick County man who died after being assaulted and spit on.

In March 2021, Cox voted against HB667, a bill that would abandon "Maryland, My Maryland" as Maryland's state song.

In 2022, Cox was one of 21 legislators to vote against a bill that would raise the state's minimum marriage age from 15 to 17, saying in an interview that a pregnant 16-year-old should be allowed to marry the father.

=== Taxes ===
During his 2016 House of Representatives campaign, Cox expressed support for trickle-down economics and called for "major cuts" to government spending.

During his 2022 gubernatorial campaign, Cox said he would immediately suspend the state's gas tax. He also said he would support providing businesses with increased tax credits, including a "dollar-for-dollar" tax credit to help employers cover the costs of paying for paid family and medical leave. Cox also supports eliminating the state income tax and would support cutting the state's corporate tax rate, personal income tax rate, and property tax rates.

During his 2026 gubernatorial campaign, Cox supported repealing tax increases passed during Moore's first term, rolling back property tax assessment valuation increases, and cutting the state's corporate tax rate from 8.25% to 5.5%. He also supported eliminating property taxes for homeowners 65 and older.

=== Transportation ===
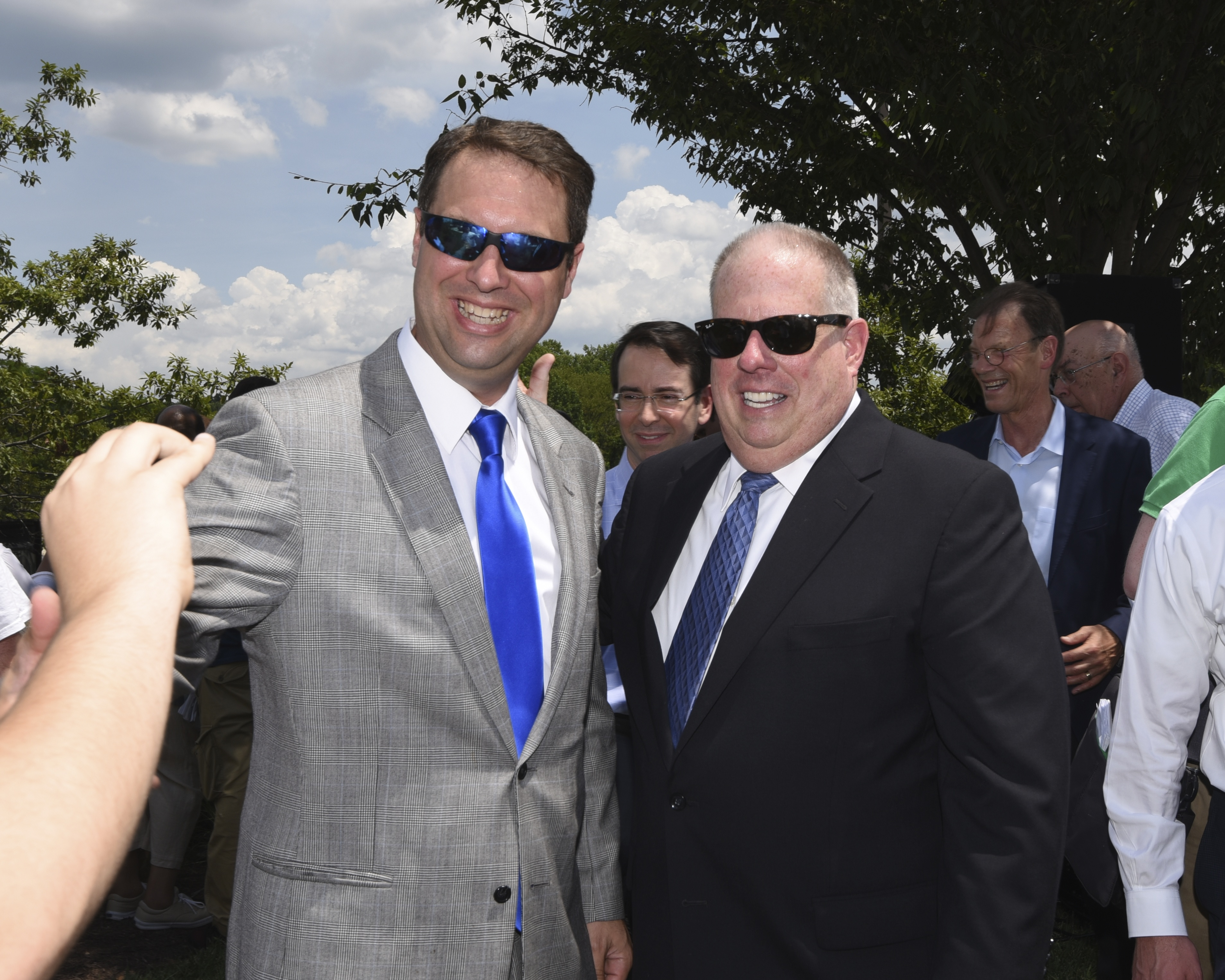
Cox attends a I-270 press briefing with Governor Larry Hogan, 2016

During his 2016 House of Representatives campaign, Cox said he supported efforts to reduce congestion on Interstate 270. During his 2022 gubernatorial campaign, he said he supported a proposal to expand I-270 and the Capital Beltway, but opposed plans to add high-occupancy toll lanes or use public–private partnerships to fund the new lanes.

== Personal life ==
Cox married Valerie Denise Gilliard in 1996. They have ten children.

== Electoral history ==
Republican primary, Dorchester County Circuit Court Clerk, 2006
Party	Candidate	Votes	%
Republican	Dan Cox	1,467	100.0

General election, Dorchester County Circuit Court Clerk, 2006
Party	Candidate	Votes	%
Democratic	Michael L. Baker	6,742	65.0
Republican	Dan Cox	3,629	35.0

Republican primary, Congress, Maryland 8th district, 2016
Party	Candidate	Votes	%
Republican	Dan Cox	20,647	44.4
Republican	Jeffrey W. Jones	9,343	20.1
Republican	Liz Matory	7,295	15.7
Republican	Shelly Skolnick	5,835	12.5
Republican	Aryeh Shudofsky	3,421	7.4

General election, Congress, Maryland 8th district, 2016
Party	Candidate	Votes	%
Democratic	Jamie Raskin	220,657	60.6
Republican	Dan Cox	124,651	34.2
Green	Nancy Wallace	11,201	3.1
Libertarian	Jasen Wunder	7,283	2.0
Write-in		532	0.1

Maryland House of Delegates District 4 Republican Primary Election, 2018
Party	Candidate	Votes	%
Republican	Dan Cox	7,728	35.5
Republican	Jesse Pippy	7,052	32.4
Republican	Barrie Ciliberti	7,018	32.2

Maryland House of Delegates District 4 General Election, 2018
Party	Candidate	Votes	%
Republican	Dan Cox	33,303	20.6
Republican	Barrie Ciliberti	31,817	19.7
Republican	Jesse Pippy	31,071	19.2
Democratic	Lois Jarman	22,807	14.1
Democratic	Ysela Bravo	21,901	13.6
Democratic	Darrin Ryan Smith	20,462	12.7
Write-in		92	0.1

Maryland gubernatorial Republican primary, 2022
Party	Candidate	Votes	%
Republican	Dan Cox; Gordana Schifanelli	153,423	52.0
Republican	Kelly Schulz; Jeff Woolford	128,302	43.5
Republican	Robin Ficker; LeRoy F. Yegge Jr.	8,268	2.8
Republican	Joe Werner; Minh Thanh Luong	5,075	1.7

Maryland gubernatorial election, 2022
Party	Candidate	Votes	%	±%
Democratic	Wes Moore; Aruna Miller	1,293,944	64.53	+21.02
Republican	Dan Cox; Gordana Schifanelli	644,000	32.12	−24.23
Libertarian	David Lashar; Christiana Logansmith	30,101	1.50	+0.93
Working Class	David Harding; Cathy White	17,154	0.86	N/A
Green	Nancy Wallace; Patrick Elder	14,580	0.73	+0.25
Write-in		5,444	0.27%	+0.19
Total votes		2,005,259	100.0	
Democratic gain from Republican				

Maryland's 6th congressional district Republican primary results, 2024
Party	Candidate	Votes	%
Republican	Neil Parrott	22,604	45.9
Republican	Dan Cox	14,797	30.1
Republican	Mariela Roca	6,071	12.3
Republican	Tom Royals	2,060	4.2
Republican	Chris Hyser	1,625	3.3
Republican	Brenda Thiam	1,607	3.3
Republican	Todd Puglisi (withdrawn)	446	0.9

Maryland gubernatorial Republican primary, 2026
Party	Candidate	Votes	%
Republican	Dan Cox; Robert Krop	89,982	43.3
Republican	Ed Hale; Tyrone Keys	74,877	36.0
Republican	John Myrick; Brenda Thiam	13,200	6.4
Republican	Carl Brunner; Kevin Rhodes	12,700	6.1
Republican	Shannon Wright; Reba Hawkins	4,907	2.4
Republican	L. D. Burkindine; Jeremy Shifflett	3,746	1.8
Republican	Nancy Taylor†; Rachael "Mohawk" Swift	3,690	1.8
Republican	Michael Oakes; Ronald Abend	2,583	1.2
Republican	Douglas Larcomb; Martina Duncan	2,132	1.0
Total votes		207,817	100.0

Party political offices
Preceded by Larry Hogan	Republican nominee for Governor of Maryland; 2022, 2026	Most recent
