= Ed Hale (businessman) =

American businessman and former banker

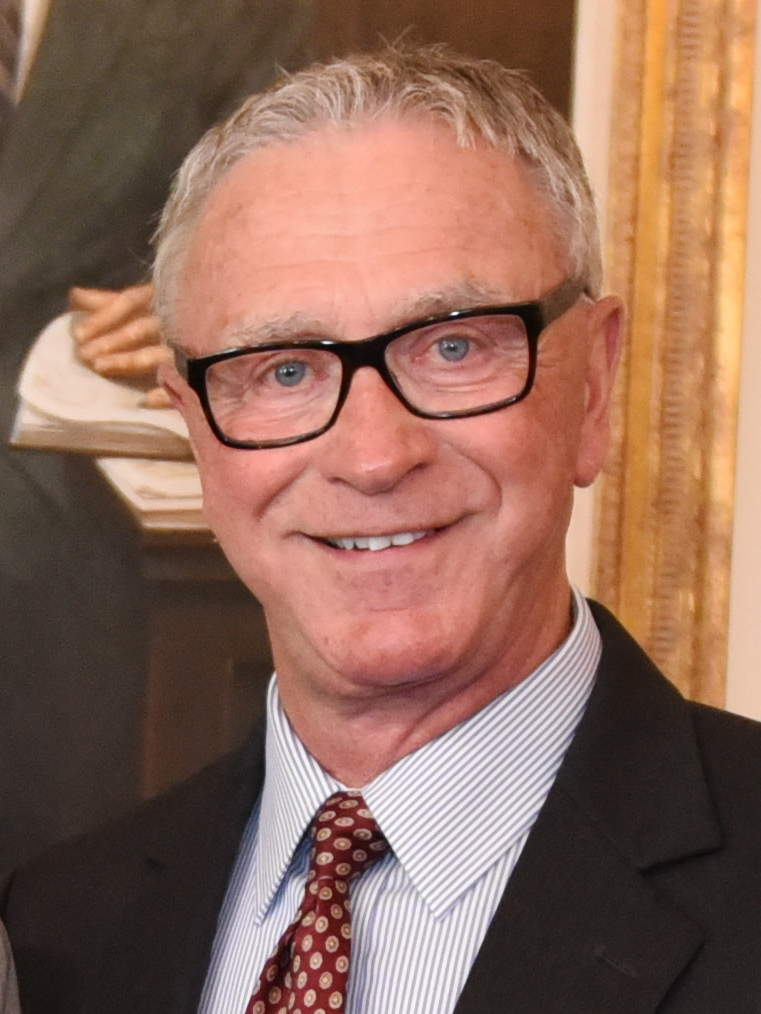
- Hale in 2016

Personal details
- Born: Edwin Hale; 1946 or 1947 (age 79–80)
- Party: Democratic (before 2025); Republican (2025–present)
- Spouse: Sheila (div. 1983)
- Children: 3
- Education: Essex Community College (attended)

Military service
- Branch: United States Air Force
- Years of service: 1966–1968
- Unit: United States Air Force Medical Service

Edwin F. Hale Sr. (born 1946/1947) is an American businessman and former banker who founded 1st Mariner Bank in 1995 and was its chairman and chief executive officer until 2011. He owns the Baltimore Blast indoor soccer team. In 2014, Hale disclosed his involvement in clandestine operations with the Central Intelligence Agency, where he supported intelligence efforts throughout the 1990s and early 2000s.

== Early life and education ==
Edwin F. Hale Sr. was raised in Sparrows Point, Maryland. He graduated from Sparrows Point High School in 1964. Hale attended Essex Community College for two years before dropping out, after which he married, fathered a child, and had a two-year stint as a medic in the U.S. Air Force.

== Career ==
Hale returned to civilian life in 1968, afterwards starting his business career at the Port of Baltimore, where he founded Hale Intermodal Trucking Co. He expanded his business interests to include trucking and barge companies. In 1991, Hale spent $1.4 million to initiate a proxy battle for control of the Bank of Baltimore, which resulted in his appointment as chief executive. In 1994, he and the board sold the Bank of Baltimore to a New Jersey bank.

In May 1995, Hale founded First Mariner Bancorp, a holding company for 1st Mariner Bank, based in Baltimore. The bank had $1.2 billion in assets and operated 24 branches in the Baltimore region by 2011. Hale was chief executive officer (CEO) and chairman of the company. The 2008 financial crisis adversely affected the bank, which faced losses due to faulty loans and was ordered by federal regulators in 2009 to increase its capital levels. Hale personally invested funds in the bank and sought additional capital without success. In 2011, Hale stepped down as chairman and CEO as part of a $36.4 million investment agreement with Priam Capital Fund I LP, which required leadership changes in exchange for recapitalization. After leaving the bank, Hale stated that he would likely no longer have an operational role but expected to remain a major shareholder.

Hale w as chairman of Visit Baltimore, the city's convention and tourism agency, beginning in 2006. He has also been involved in real estate development, including a project at Canton Crossing, where 31 acres were sold to BCP Investors LLC.

In 1998, Hale purchased the Baltimore Blast, a professional indoor soccer team. He had also been an owner of the original Baltimore Blast (1980–1992), a Major Indoor Soccer League team in the early 1980s. Under his ownership, the team played in five different leagues through 2016. In February 2013, following a dispute with Baltimore's city government, Hale moved the headquarters of the Baltimore Blast to Edgemere, Maryland, and the team would no longer practice at the Clarence H. "Du" Burns Arena, though they continued to play games at the 1st Mariner Arena. In February 2016, Hale announced plans to remove the team from the Major Arena Soccer League and establish a new Indoor Professional League, with headquarters in Baltimore County, Maryland and himself as the franchisor.

Around 2014-2015, Hale disclosed that he worked covertly for the Central Intelligence Agency (CIA) for nearly a decade during the 1990s and early 2000s. He stated that he allowed the CIA to create a fictitious company under his corporate umbrella to be used as cover for field operatives. According to Hale, he spoke with a CIA handler between 30 and 50 times per year and traveled to several countries, including Saudi Arabia, Poland, Denmark, and Norway, reporting economic conditions to the agency upon his return. He also claimed involvement in a canceled operation in Georgia in 1998 concerning the purchase of ships for intelligence purposes. Hale revealed that he played a role in the CIA’s early search for Osama bin Laden by facilitating covert agent deployments across Central Asia. Hale says his role with the CIA ended after the September 11 attacks.

== 2026 Maryland gubernatorial campaign ==
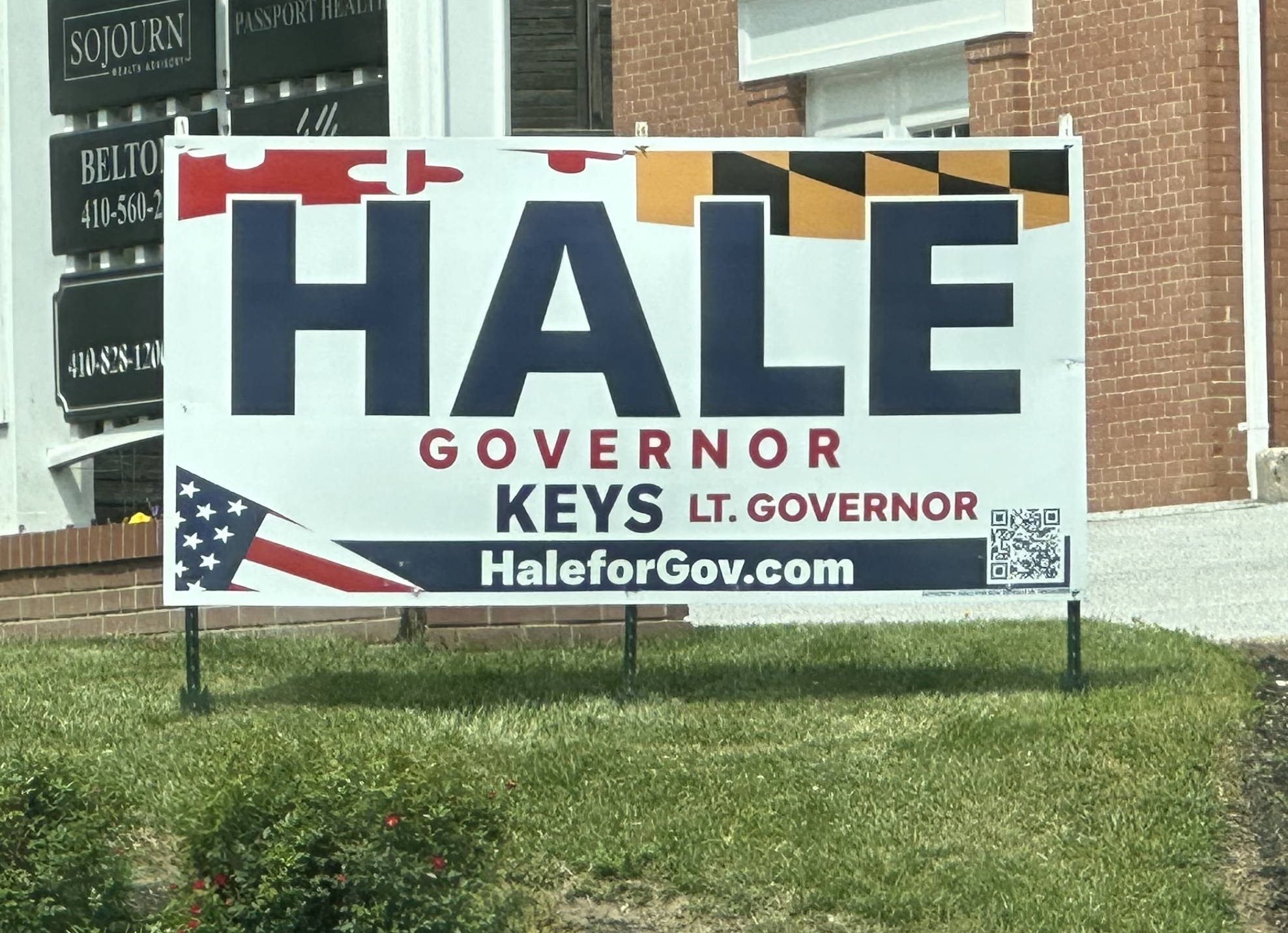
Ed Hale for Governor campaign sign in Lutherville, Maryland

In May 2025, Hale told Maryland Matters that he would run for Governor of Maryland as a Democrat, challenging incumbent Wes Moore. On August 20, 2025, Hale announced that he would drop out of the Democratic primary and instead run for governor as a Republican. His running mate is Tyrone Keys, a financial services professional.

During the Republican primary, Hale ran on a platform of tax freezes and deregulation, increased spending on public safety and infrastructure, and reduced reliance on the federal government. He also supported reopening fossil fuel power stations, implementing a school choice system, and increasing support for veterans programs, and proposed allowing the public to rent out Government House for events and overnight stays as a way to raise revenues for the state as opposed to raising taxes.

Hale was viewed as a frontrunner in the Republican primary alongside former state delegate and 2022 gubernatorial nominee Dan Cox. Hale sought to portray himself as more electable than Cox, citing Cox's landslide defeat to Moore in the 2022 election. In June 2026, the Maryland Democratic Party and Governor Moore began sending out mailers to Republican primary voters and airing advertisements promoting Cox over Hale. Cox and Hale condemned the spending, with Hale accusing Democrats of trying to "handpick their own Republican opponent" and later posting an AI-generated image of Moore hugging Cox on social media in response to the Democratic Party's efforts. Cox's campaign and the Maryland Democratic Party claimed that the image was a violation the state's laws prohibiting the use of deepfakes to impersonate someone with the intention of causing harm; Hale campaign spokesperson Andrew Brightwell rejected that the image was against the law, saying that it should be classified as satire under the First Amendment to the United States Constitution and that the only ones trying to misinform in the election are Moore and the Democratic Party.

Hale was defeated by Cox in the Republican primary election on June 23, 2026, placing second with 36.0 percent of the vote.

== Personal life ==
Hale has been divorced twice. In 1987, his first wife, Sheila, filed a lawsuit against Hale, accusing him of fraud for cajoling her into signing a separation agreement in 1983, which left her with about 4 percent of their money. Sheila had not realized her divorce was over until 1985, when Hale asked her to borrow her luggage to take his girlfriend to Mexico. Hale was found guilty of fraud and his ex-wife was awarded $6.8 million in damages, which was later invalidated after a judge determined that Hale's net worth at the time was only $5 million.

Hale stated that he began sleeping with a sawed-off shotgun by his bed during his time assisting the CIA, due to concerns that his name might be exposed if agents were caught.

He has two daughters and a son. Hale said he commissioned his biography, titled Hale Storm, in part to explain his absences during their upbringing. He reported that his relationships with his daughters improved after the book was published. Hale owns a 186-acre farm.

Hale was the commencement speaker at Towson University's class of 2007 graduation ceremony, during which he received an honorary doctorate.
