= Charles Jenkins =

Charles Jenkins may refer to:

== Politics ==
- Charles A. Jenkins (born 1962), former member of the Maryland House of Delegates
- Charles E. Jenkins (1821/1822–1896), member of the Wisconsin State Assembly and the New York State Assembly
- Charles F. Jenkins (politician), member of the Georgia House of Representatives
- Charles J. Jenkins (1805–1883), American politician from Georgia
- Charles J. Jenkins (Illinois politician) (1897–1954), American lawyer and politician
- Chuck Jenkins (born 1956), Sheriff of Frederick County, Maryland

== Sports ==
- Charles Jenkins (basketball) (born 1989), American-born naturalized Serbian professional basketball player
- Charles Jenkins Jr. (born 1964), former American track and field athlete
- Charles O. Jenkins (1872–1952), American football coach, lawyer, and shipbuilder
- Charles Jenkins Sr. (born 1934), former American athlete
- Charlie Jenkins (Australian rules footballer) (1878–?)

== Music ==
- Charles Jenkins (American Gospel musician) (born 1975), American Gospel musician
- Charles Jenkins (Australian musician) (born 1966), Australian musician

== Other ==
- Charles Jenkins (bishop) (1951–2021), 10th bishop of the Episcopal Diocese of Louisiana
- Charles F. Jenkins (Quaker) (1865–1951), American Quaker and historian
- Charles Francis Jenkins (1867–1934), American engineer
- Charles Robert Jenkins (1940–2017), United States Army deserter
