= Michael Hough (politician) =

American politician (born 1979)

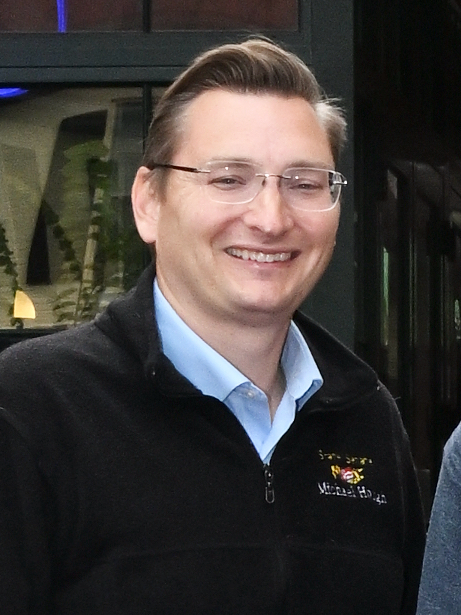
- Hough in 2022

Member of the Maryland Senate from the 4th district
- In office January 15, 2015 – January 11, 2023
- Preceded by: David R. Brinkley
- Succeeded by: William Folden

Member of the Maryland House of Delegates from the 3B district
- In office January 12, 2011 – January 15, 2015
- Preceded by: Charles A. Jenkins
- Succeeded by: William Folden

Personal details
- Born: Michael Joseph Hough; November 4, 1979 (age 46) Silver Spring, Maryland, U.S.
- Party: Republican
- Spouse: JoeyLynn
- Children: 3
- Education: Community College of the Air Force (AA); Towson University (BA)

Military service
- Branch/service: United States Air Force
- Years of service: 1998–2002
- Hough's voice Hough introduces himself to President Donald Trump. Recorded November 22, 2019

Michael Joseph Hough (/hʌf/; born November 4, 1979) is an American politician who served in the Maryland Senate, representing District 4 in Frederick and Carroll Counties, from 2015 to 2023. A member of the Republican Party, Hough previously represented District 3B in the Maryland House of Delegates from 2011 to 2015. Hough unsuccessfully ran for Frederick County Executive in 2022, losing to county councilmember Jessica Fitzwater.

== Background ==
Hough was born in Silver Spring, Maryland on November 4, 1979. He was one of three children, and was raised in Montgomery Village. Hough graduated from Watkins Mill High School, afterwards enlisting in the U.S. Air Force, serving as a missile maintenance technician from 1998 to 2002, and attending the Community College of the Air Force, where he earned an associate degree in applied sciences. During his service, his parents moved from Montgomery Village to Point of Rocks, prompting him to also move to Frederick County. Hough later earned a Bachelor of Science in political science from Towson University in 2007.

After serving in the Air Force, Hough worked as a sales associate for Sears from 2002 to 2004, after which he became a legislative aide to Maryland state senator Alex Mooney until his election to the Frederick County Republican Central Committee in 2007. He served as the chair of the central committee in 2008, during which he organized support for Republican candidates in the 2008 and 2010 elections.

== In the legislature ==
=== Maryland House of Delegates ===
In 2009, Hough launched a campaign for the Maryland House of Delegates in District 3B.

In January 2010, Hough applied to fill a vacancy in the Maryland House of Delegates left by the resignation of state delegate Richard B. Weldon Jr., who resigned to become an executive assistant to Frederick mayor Randy McClement. He was nominated to fill the vacancy by the Frederick County Republican Central Committee alongside Charles A. Jenkins and John Lovells; Governor Martin O'Malley appointed Jenkins to the seat later that month. Afterwards, Hough targeted Jenkins in the Republican primary. During his campaign, he was able to outraise Jenkins and walked from Sandy Hook to Monrovia, a distance of 40 miles (64 km), to meet with voters. He also ran on a platform of opposing tax increases, privatizing government services, and deregulation.

Hough was sworn in to the Maryland House of Delegates on January 12, 2011, where he served on the Judiciary Committee during his entire tenure and as assistant majority leader from 2013 to 2015. In 2012, he served as a delegate to the Republican National Convention, pledged to Mitt Romney.

=== Maryland Senate ===
2014 Republican primary results by precinct Hough: 50–60%; 60–70%; 70–80%; 80–90%; Tie

In February 2014, Hough announced that he would run for the Maryland Senate in District 4, challenging incumbent state senator David R. Brinkley, whom he criticized for voting for O'Malley's budgets and for a bill providing health insurance to uninsured individuals. In May 2014, an Emmitsburg resident filed an ethics complaint against Hough for using taxpayer funding to send him a birthday note on an official letterhead, noting that he wasn't even one of Hough's constituents (instead living in Brinkley's district). Hough disputed the complaint, saying that he received approval from state ethics advisors to send birthday messages so long as he paid for the postage. During the Republican primary, he received endorsements from U.S. Representative Andy Harris, former U.S. Representative Roscoe Bartlett, and state delegates Kathy Afzali, Justin Ready, and Neil Parrott. Hough defeated Brinkley in the Republican primary election on June 24, 2014, receiving 67.7 percent of the vote to Brinkley's 32.3 percent. He faced Democratic nominee Dan Rupli in the general election, during which he donated campaign funds to other Republican nominees in local races. He defeated Rupli with 67.7 percent of the vote in the general election on November 4, 2014.

Hough was sworn into the Maryland Senate on January 14, 2015, where he served on the Judicial Proceedings Committee during his entire tenure. During the 2016 Republican Party presidential primaries, Hough served as the chair of Ted Cruz's campaign in Maryland. Maryland Matters described Hough as being "one of the most prolific fundraisers" in the Maryland Senate; during the 2018 elections, Hough helped raise funds for the Senate Republican Caucus Committee and the Frederick County Republican Victory Slate to support Republican nominees in the Frederick County executive election and the Maryland Senate District 3 election.

From 2015 to 2017, Hough worked as a policy advisor for the Faith and Freedom Coalition, afterwards working as the chief of staff to U.S. Representative Alex Mooney. During the 2020 presidential election, he canvassed and phonebanked for Donald Trump in York, Pennsylvania. Hough was in the Rayburn House Office Building during the January 6 Capitol attack, during which he called on Trump to call on demonstrators to stand down.

During his 2018 re-election campaign, Hough raffled away an AR-15–style rifle with 250 rounds of ammunition. Frederick County Sheriff Chuck Jenkins questioned the legality of Hough's AR-15 rifle, noting that he did not obtain a raffle permit from the county permitting office; however, Hough said that he did not need one as county law regarding raffle permits only applied to nonprofit organizations.

In October 2020, the Maryland Senate Republican Caucus voted to elect Hough to serve as Senate minority whip, replacing state senator Steve Hershey, who opted against reelection to the position, which was seen by the media as the Senate Republican caucus becoming more conservative as to push back on the perceived leftward shift of the Maryland Democratic Party following the election of Bill Ferguson as Senate president. In this capacity, Hough promised to work with Democratic lawmakers on issues including police reform, but lobbied against bills opposed by the Hogan administration such as the Blueprint for Maryland's Future. He stepped down as minority whip on October 4, 2021, to focus on his campaign for Frederick County executive. He was succeeded by state senator Justin Ready.

== 2022 Frederick County Executive campaign ==
2022 Frederick County executive election results by precinct Fitzwater: 50–60%; 60–70%; 70–80%; Hough: 50–60%; 60–70%; 70–80%

On May 17, 2021, Hough announced that he would run for Frederick County Executive in 2022, seeking to succeed term-limited county executive Jan Gardner.

During his campaign, Hough sought to cast himself as a moderate, running on a platform of cutting property taxes and government spending, expanding county highways including U.S. Route 15 Interstate 270, and slowing urban sprawl through the preservation of farmland. He also outraised and outspent his Democratic opponents throughout the election, becoming the first Frederick County executive candidate to spend more than $1 million during the campaign, and received endorsements from Governor Larry Hogan and Democratic state legislators Jill P. Carter, Robert Zirkin, and Joseph F. Vallario Jr.

Hough ran unopposed in the primary election and faced county councilmember Jessica Fitzwater in the general election. Hough sought to associate Fitzwater with the with incumbent county executive Jan Gardner and criticized her for "doing nothing" in response to Frederick County Public Schools' illegal use of seclusion and restraint on disabled students, and warned that electing Fitzwater would transform Frederick County into "Montgomery County North". He also sought to associate himself with Hogan and distance himself from Republican gubernatorial nominee Dan Cox.

Hough was narrowly defeated in the general election by Fitzwater, who edged out Hough by a margin of 989 votes. Despite his loss, he outperformed other statewide Republican nominees in the county, including Cox, Barry Glassman, and Michael Peroutka, and congressional nominee Neil Parrott.

== Post-legislative career ==
Following his defeat, Hough became the director of federal relations for NumbersUSA.

== Personal life ==
Hough is married to his wife, JoeyLynn, who grew up in North Dakota and whom he met at the Cheyenne Club in Cheyenne, Wyoming. Together, they have three children and live in Brunswick, Maryland. While Hough was a member of the Maryland General Assembly, his family would rent a home in Annapolis and his children would attend Anne Arundel County Public Schools from January to April, afterwards transferring back to Frederick County Public Schools. JoeyLynn was elected to the Frederick County Republican Central Committee in 2018, and later sought election to the Maryland Republican Party's executive committee, but lost to Tony Campbell.

When Hough was 25 (2004 or 2005), he sued his parents and took custody over his younger brother. Also when he was 25, his father committed suicide.

== Political positions ==
=== Crime and policing ===
During the 2013 legislative session, Hough voted against repealing the death penalty in Maryland. In 2019, he cited this vote in voting against a bill to legalize medical aid in dying.

During the 2016 legislative session, Hough introduced legislation to require police to pursue criminal charges against a person before they could use asset forfeiture. He also expressed concerns with proposals to limit the police use of strip searches and shackles against youths, which he claimed would make juvenile facilities more dangerous.

In 2017, Hough introduced a legislation to increase sentences for drug dealers who knowingly sell fentanyl, which passed and was signed into law by Governor Larry Hogan. He also supported a bill that would prohibit police from asking detainees about their immigration status.

During the 2020 legislative session, Hough introduced a bill to make strangulation a first-degree felony assault. He also introduced a bill to make gun theft a felony offense and to increase penalties for repeat firearm offenders.

In 2021, Hough opposed legislation to remove the governor of Maryland from the state's parole board and criticized legislators for removing an amendment that would require six parole board members to vote to grant parole, and another bill that would prohibit state governments from holding 287(g) agreements with U.S. Immigration and Customs Enforcement. He also supported a bill ban the use of excessive force by police officers and initially supported a bill to make police misconduct records publicly accessible, but ultimately voted against the bill after an amendment allowing unsustained complaints to remain in the public record was adopted.

During the 2022 legislative session, Hough supported a bill to raise the salary for the Frederick County Sheriff, and criticized Democratic legislators after the bill narrowly failed in the House of Delegates. During his 2022 county executive campaign, he said he supported Frederick County's 287(g) agreement, criticizing its opponents for making a "terrible demagoguery of this program", and expressed support for adding the Frederick County Sheriff's Office to the county public services ordinance.

=== Education ===
As a state legislator, Hough protested against bills granting voting rights to student members of boards of education. He supported Governor Larry Hogan's executive order mandating a post-Labor Day start date for schools and opposed legislation passed in 2019 overturning the executive order. Hough initially voted for the Blueprint for Maryland's Future, but voted against overriding Governor Larry Hogan's veto of the bill, citing the economic impact of the COVID-19 pandemic.

During the 2013 legislative session, Hough introduced legislation that would allow homeschooled students to participate in public school sports teams.

In 2015, Hough introduced a bill that would require parent to consent before schools could survey students about their drug use or sexual activity, which he called a "troubling trend".

During the 2020 legislative session, Hough introduced legislation creating remedial measures for bullies in public schools, which died in committee.

In December 2021, after the U.S. Department of Justice uncovered thousands of incidents of seclusion and restraint on students with disabilities in Frederick County Public Schools, Hough called on the Maryland superintendent of schools to open an investigation into the matter. During the 2022 legislative session, he supported a bill to ban seclusion in schools.

During his 2022 county executive campaign, Hough committed to increasing education funding in Frederick County.

=== Environment ===
Hough opposes providing clean energy credits to trash incinerators. In February 2020, Hough questioned whether a bill to ban balloon releases was necessary, arguing that the state's anti-littering laws already made balloon releases illegal and that the penalties for releasing a balloon were too lenient.

=== Ethics ===
During the 2014 legislative session, Hough introduced legislation that would require legislative hearings to be livestreamed. In 2019, he supported a bill that would require legislative sessions to be livestreamed, which was withdrawn after House Speaker Michael E. Busch and Senate President Thomas V. Miller Jr. said they would begin livestreaming sessions in 2020.

In 2017, Hough introduced an ethics reform bill that would ban non-elected members of county decision-making boards to resign after creating campaign finance accounts and to disclose donations of at least $500, and ban campaign contributions from businesses with pending applications. The bill was seen as a response to an ethics reform bill introduced by Frederick County Executive Jan Gardner, who criticized Hough for not proposing sections of his bill as amendments to her own. After neither ethics bills passed, Hough and Gardner agreed to merge the two bills; the compromise bill was reintroduced in 2018, during which it passed and became law.

Also in 2017, Hough opposed a bill that would require Maryland use an independent redistricting commission to draw its congressional districts if six other states agreed to do the same. In March 2019, after the United States Court of Appeals for the Fourth Circuit in Benisek v. Lamone struck down Maryland's redistricting plan as unconstitutionally gerrymandered, Hough said he supported maps proposed by Governor Larry Hogan, which would have redrawn Maryland's 6th congressional district to include Frederick and Carroll counties, thereby making it more favorable to Republicans. He supported the U.S. Supreme Court's decision in Benisek v. Lamone.

During the 2020 legislative session, Hough proposed changing the Senate Rules to limit state senators to introducing 20 bills per year, excluding administrative bills, local bills, and committee bills, which he argued would make the legislature more productive and cut down on perennially failing bills. Hough's proposal was not adopted by the Senate Rules Committee, though legislators expressed openness to the idea of a bill limit and said that they would study the issue over the summer.

=== Gun policy ===
During the 2018 legislative session, Hough opposed legislation to abolish the Maryland Handgun Permit Review Board, which he called a "check and balance" against "nameless, faceless bureaucrats".

In 2019, Hough introduced a bill that would allow the Maryland State Police to expand payment methods for handgun permits to include electronic payments.

During the 2020 legislative session, Hough introduced legislation to allow people with medical marijuana licenses to purchase and carry firearms. The bill unanimously passed the Maryland Senate, but died in the House of Delegates. He also opposed a bill creating a gun buyback program in Maryland, saying that criminals would sell inoperable guns back to the state instead of working assault weapons.

In April 2020, Hough delivered a letter to Governor Larry Hogan calling him to reopen gun shops amid the COVID-19 pandemic, noting that governors in New Jersey and Maine allowed gun shops to remain open.

During the 2021 legislative session, Hough voted to sustain Hogan's veto on a bill requiring background checks for shotgun and rifle sales, arguing that the bill would "punish" sportsmen and farmers, and that legislators should instead prioritize legislation to reduce gun violence.

=== Housing ===
During the 2018 legislative session, Hough introduced a bill that would allow speed up evictions of dangerous tenants from fourteen to seven days.

During his 2022 county executive campaign, Hough blamed the Frederick County government for the county's affordable housing shortage, arguing that the county's property taxes were "burdening" residents and developers, and argued that the county should focus development in areas outside of Frederick, claiming that it would lessen the burden on roads and schools. He also opposed the construction of the county's 209,000 square-foot facility, saying that he would issue a stop-work order on construction for the project and create an independent commission to investigate the county's $20 million purchase of land for the facility.

=== Minimum wage ===
During debate on a bill to raise the minimum wage in 2014, Hough introduced an amendment exempting businesses within 90 miles of the state border from the wage increase, which was rejected by the House of Delegates. During the 2019 legislative session, he opposed legislation to raise Maryland's minimum wage to $15 an hour, which he said would eliminate starting jobs for teenagers.

=== Social issues ===
Hough is pro-life and supported legislation to restrict abortions while serving in the Maryland General Assembly. During his 2014 state senate campaign, he criticized Brinkley for not supporting efforts to overturn the results of 1992 Maryland Question 6, which upheld a state law codifying the U.S. Supreme Court's decision in Roe v. Wade. In September 2015, amid the Planned Parenthood 2015 undercover videos controversy, Hough wrote a letter to Brinkley, now the Maryland Budget Secretary, calling on him to eliminate the use of state funds to support Planned Parenthood.

During the 2018 legislative session, Hough opposed a bill to remove "Maryland, My Maryland" as the official state song, defending the song against criticisms from other legislators who called it "racist".

During debate on a bill to raise the tobacco minimum purchase age to 21 years old in 2019, Hough introduced an amendment that would keep the age limit at 18 years for members of the military, which was added to the bill. In November 2019, he met with President Donald Trump and other White House officials to discuss federal legislation to increase the smoking age to 21, during which he expressed opposition to the proposal.

In September 2020, following President Donald Trump's executive order establishing the Interagency Task Force for Building and Rebuilding Monuments to American Heroes to create a "National Garden of American Heroes", Hough wrote a letter to the committee to recommend a memorial dedicated to anti-communist Whittaker Chambers. The proposal was opposed by Chambers' family, who wrote an op-ed to the Carroll County Times thanking Hough for proposing the monument but asking him to withdraw Chambers' name from consideration.

During the 2021 legislative session, Hough spoke against a bill to eliminate the statute of limitations on child sexual abuse cases, criticizing state delegate C. T. Wilson, who introduced the bill, for going back on his agreement with the Maryland Catholic Conference to introduce no further legislation on child sexual abuse lawsuits after legislators passed a bill expanding the statute of limitations from 25 to 38-years-old, but including a statute of repose to prevent lawsuits against the Catholic Church.

=== Taxes ===
In 2021, Hough opposed a bill to extend the state's earned income tax credit to undocumented immigrants, and criticized Governor Larry Hogan's RELIEF Act, which provided more than $1 billion in tax relief and stimulus checks to small businesses and families, for not going far enough. During the 2022 legislative session, he introduced a bill to decouple Maryland's gas tax from inflation.

== Electoral history ==
Maryland House of Delegates District 3B Republican primary election, 2010
Party	Candidate	Votes	%
Republican	Michael Hough	3,017	68.3
Republican	Charles Jenkins (incumbent)	1,399	31.7

Maryland House of Delegates District 3B election, 2010
Party	Candidate	Votes	%
Republican	Michael Hough	10,090	57.4
Democratic	Paul Gilligan	7,444	42.4
Write-in		43	0.2

Maryland Senate District 4 Republican primary election, 2014
Party	Candidate	Votes	%
Republican	Michael Hough	8,946	67.7
Republican	David R. Brinkley (incumbent)	4,261	32.3

Maryland Senate District 4 election, 2014
Party	Candidate	Votes	%
Republican	Michael Hough	31,414	67.7
Democratic	Dan Rupli	14,873	32.1
Write-in		117	0.3

Maryland Senate District 4 election, 2018
Party	Candidate	Votes	%
Republican	Michael Hough (incumbent)	35,240	59.1
Democratic	Jessica Douglass	24,358	40.8
Write-in		47	0.1

Frederick County Executive Republican primary election, 2022
Party	Candidate	Votes	%
Republican	Michael Joseph Hough	17,209	100.0

Frederick County Executive election, 2022
Party	Candidate	Votes	%
Democratic	Jessica Fitzwater	53,291	50.4
Republican	Michael Hough	52,302	49.5
Write-in		147	0.1
Majority		989	0.94
