= C. Clifton Virts =

American politician and lawyer (1910–1985)

Member of the Maryland House of Delegates from the 3B district
- In office 1975–1978 Serving with Julien P. Delphey
- Preceded by: District established
- Succeeded by: James E. McClellan

Member of the Maryland House of Delegates from the Frederick County district
- In office 1947–1974 Serving with Horace M. Alexander, Melvin H. Derr, William E. Hauver, Joseph B. Payne, Jacob R. Ramsburg, Richard B. Baumgardner, S. Fenton Harris, John A. Derr, Charles H. Smelser, Gary L. Utterback, Charles E. Collins, William M. Houck, Charles Mathias, Goodloe E. Byron, E. Earl Remsberg, Julien P. Delphey, Wallace E. Hutton
- Preceded by: Harold U. Frushour, Robert L. Grove, W. Jerome Offutt, Jacob R. Ramsburg, Gary L. Utterback, Richard E. Zimmerman
- Succeeded by: Redistricting

Personal details
- Born: Charles Clifton Virts Jr. March 3, 1910 Leesburg, Virginia, U.S.
- Died: March 28, 1985 (aged 75) Frederick, Maryland, U.S.
- Party: Democratic
- Spouse: Stella Anne Overman (m. 1942)
- Children: 2
- Education: University of Virginia
- Alma mater: Virginia School for the Deaf and the Blind; University of Maryland School of Law
- Occupation: Politician; lawyer

Charles Clifton Virts Jr. (March 3, 1910 – March 28, 1985) was an American politician and lawyer from Maryland. He served as a member of the Maryland House of Delegates, representing Frederick County and district 3B from 1947 to 1978.

== Early life ==
Charles Clifton Virts Jr. was born on March 3, 1910, in Leesburg, Virginia, to Maude and C. Clifton Virts. At the age of 9, he lost his eyesight after a dynamite cap exploded in his face. He attended Leesburg public school. In 1926, his family moved to Frederick, Maryland. He graduated from the Virginia School for the Deaf and the Blind in 1930. He attended the University of Virginia. He graduated from the University of Maryland School of Law in 1940 and was admitted to the bar in the same year.

== Career ==
On April 8, 1941, Virts began practicing law in Frederick. He continued practicing law for the remainder of his life. He was president of the Frederick County Bar Association in 1959 and 1960. He was also an equity examiner for Frederick County.

Virts was a Democrat. He served as a member of the Maryland House of Delegates, representing Frederick County from 1947 to 1978. He represented Frederick County from 1947 to 1974. He represented District 3B from 1975 to 1978. While in session, he was known for his guide dog sitting next to him in the aisle. Governor J. Millard Tawes appointed Virts to the State Parks Commission.

In 1965 and 1966, Virts was chairman of the Fort Detrick Boy Scouts. He was a member of the Frederick Lions Club and later the Yellow Springs Lions Club.

== Personal life ==
Virts married Stella Anne Overman, daughter of William Samuel Overman, of Elizabeth City, North Carolina, in 1942. They had one son and one daughter, Charles Clifton III and Nancy. He taught Bible school for All Saints Episcopal Church in Frederick.

Virts died on March 28, 1985, at Frederick Memorial Hospital.
