= William Folden =

American politician (born 1972)

Bill Folden
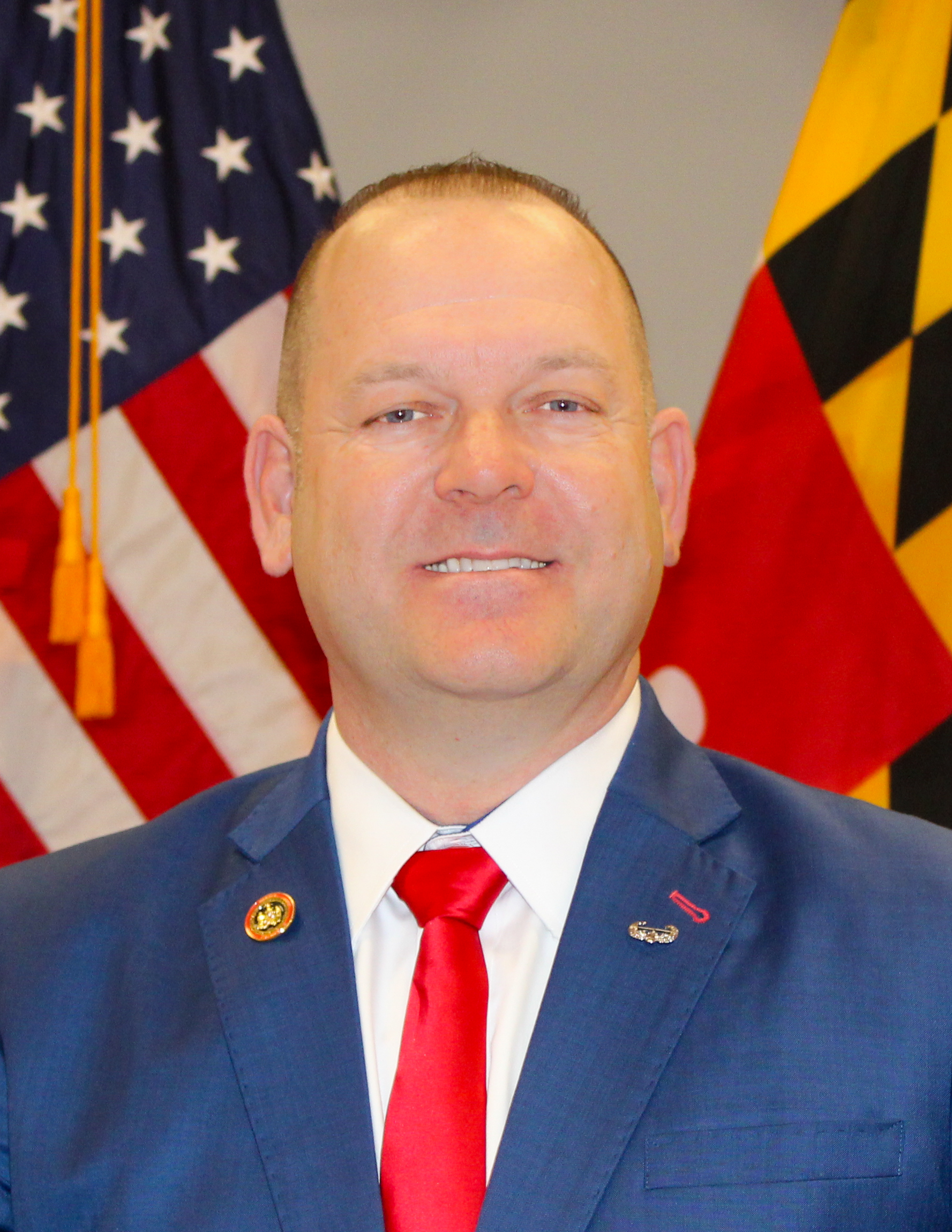

Member of the Maryland Senate from the 4th district
- Incumbent
- Assumed office January 11, 2023
- Preceded by: Michael Hough

Member of the Maryland House of Delegates from the 3B district
- In office January 14, 2015 – January 9, 2019
- Preceded by: Michael Hough
- Succeeded by: Ken Kerr

Personal details
- Born: April 5, 1972 (age 54) Hagerstown, Maryland, U.S.
- Party: Republican
- Children: 3

William G. Folden (born April 5, 1972) is an American politician who is currently a Republican member of the Maryland Senate, representing District 4 since 2023. He was previously a member of the Maryland House of Delegates, representing District 3B from 2015 to 2019.

== Background ==
Folden was born in Hagerstown, Maryland, and graduated from nearby Governor Thomas Johnson High School. He later attended Frederick Community College, where he earned an A.A. degree in criminal justice. Folden also served in the United States Army in the military police corps and as an infantry sniper. From 1994 to 2011, Folden served as the deputy sheriff of Frederick County, and has served as a police officer for the city of Frederick since 2011, even working as an officer while in the Maryland legislature. He retired as a police officer for the University of Maryland, Baltimore in July 2025.

== Political career ==
In 2006, Folden announced his candidacy for Frederick County Sheriff. He was defeated by deputy sheriff Chuck Jenkins in the Republican primary, coming in third with 21.16 percent of the vote.

In June 2021, Folden filed for the House of Delegates race in District 4. In September 2021, he withdrew his bid for delegate and entered the Senate race in District 4 for the seat being vacated by Michael Hough. He won the state senate election on November 8, 2022, by a margin of 57.54% to 42.36%.

=== House of Delegates ===
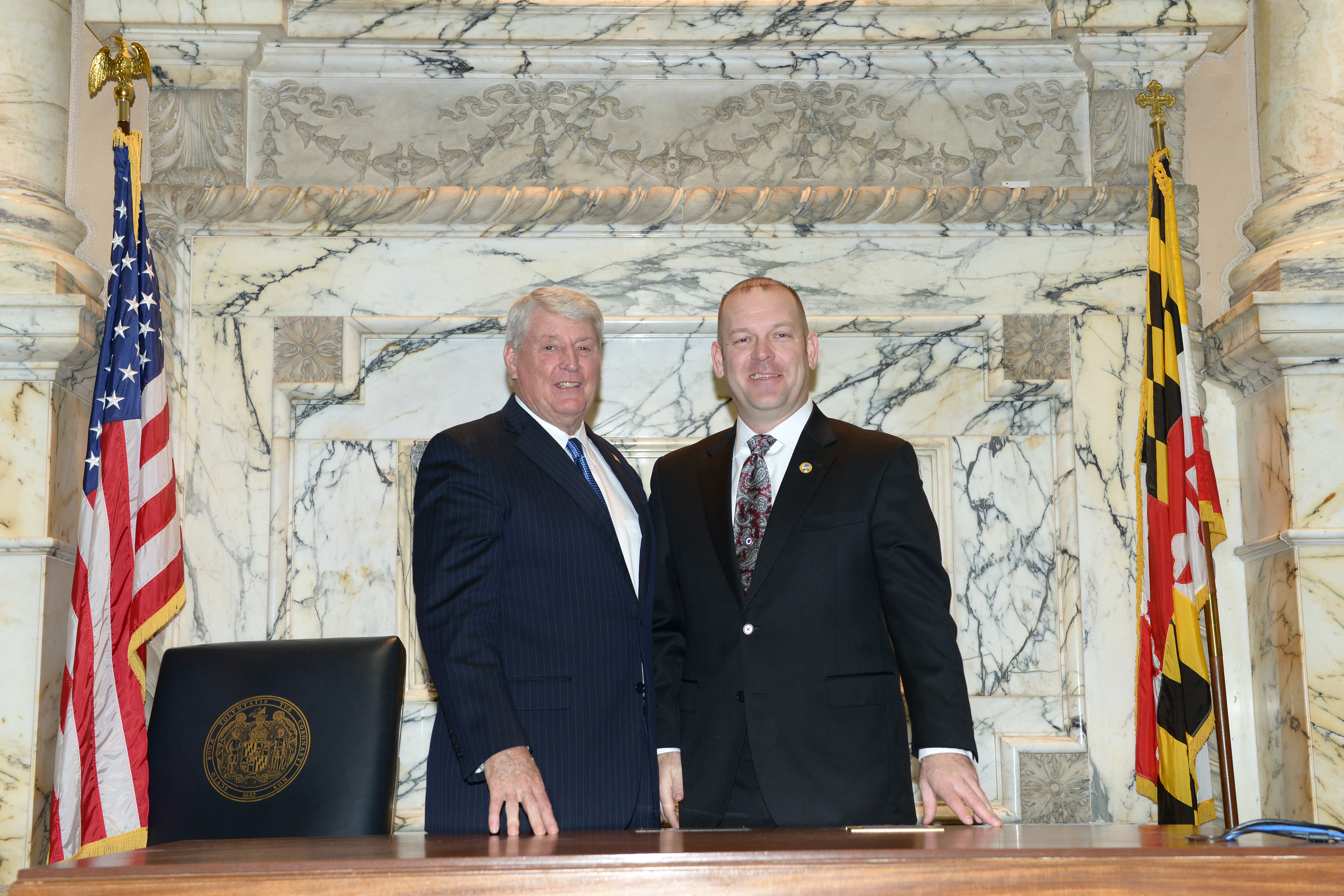
Folden with Speaker of the Maryland House of Delegates Michael E. Busch, 2015

Folden was sworn into the Maryland House of Delegates on January 14, 2015. He served in this position until January 9, 2019, after being defeated by Democratic challenger Ken Kerr in the 2018 Maryland House of Delegates election. He was the only active police officer in the state legislature.

==== Committees and caucuses ====
- Member, Judiciary Committee, 2015 (family law subcommittee, 2015)
- Environment and Transportation Committee, 2015–2019 (housing & real property subcommittee, 2015–19; land use & ethics subcommittee, 2015–19; motor vehicle & transportation subcommittee, 2017–2019)
- Member, Public Safety and Policing Work Group, 2015–2016
- Chair, Frederick County Delegation, 2018–2019 (vice-chair, 2017)
- Member, Maryland Legislative Sportsmen's Caucus, 2015–2019
- Maryland Veterans Caucus, 2015–2019

=== Maryland Senate ===
Folden was sworn into the Maryland Senate on January 11, 2023. He was a member of the Judicial Proceedings Committee, to which he brought a conservative law-and-order perspective and where he often clashed with more liberal members of the committee. During the 2024 legislative session, Folden was absent from two committee voting sessions because he was frustrated with some of his colleagues for making remarks about policing and the justice system that he felt was attacking him and his profession.

During the final hours of the 2026 legislative session, Folden engaged in a spirited discussion with Sally Robb, the chief of staff of Senate President Bill Ferguson. As Folden became more animated in the discussion, Ferguson sent the Senate Sergeant-at-Arms James Harrod to intervene; the discussion continued with Harrod watching closely from the back of the chamber. Later that night, during debate on Senate Bill 623, a bill creating premium cigar lounge liquor licenses for tobacco shops, Folden sought to add a provision to the bill to raise the salary of the Frederick County Sheriff. Ferguson, frustrated with Republicans slowing down the passage of bills, interrupted Folden to say "Senator, please stop, you've embarrassed yourself enough" before dropping the bill and adjourning sine die. In an interview with Maryland Matters, Folden said he was upset because he was working with Senate leadership to pass a salary increase for the Frederick County Sheriff by attaching it to a bill about the Prince George's County state's attorney, but that leadership abruptly reversed course. He also said he did not begrudge Ferguson for his stern remarks toward him, saying that the Senate was operating through "a high-tension time".

Folden ran for re-election to a second term in 2026, but was defeated in the general election by Democratic challenger Lara Westdorp. In an interview with The Baltimore Banner following the election, Folden blamed voter frustrations with President Donald Trump on his loss.

== Political positions ==
=== Crime ===
In February 2026, Folden was the only Republican member of the Senate Judicial Proceedings Committee to vote against a bill to reduce the number of crimes for which youth would be automatically charged as an adult, citing multiple headlines from cases involving teens being charged as adults in attacks and murders using firearms. The bill would still automatically charge 16- and 17-year-olds for first- and second-degree murder and attempted murder, but would no longer automatically charge youth for first-degree assault, use of a firearm in a drug crime or felony drug conviction, possession of a regulated handgun, or carrying a handgun. During debate on the bill on the Senate floor in March 2026, Folden introduced an amendment that would require youth charged with first-degree assault to be tried in adult court, which was rejected.

=== Education ===
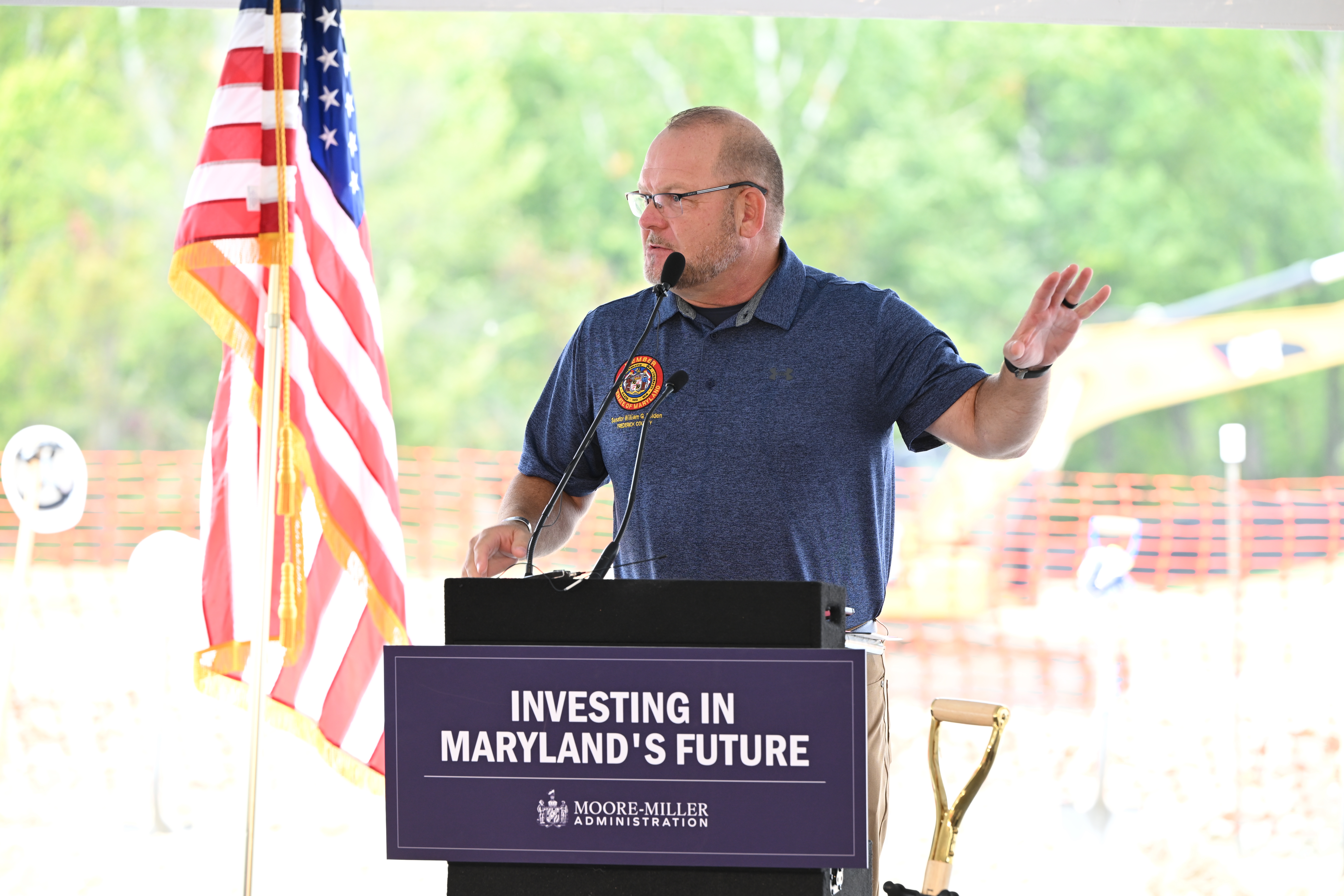
Folden speaks at the groundbreaking for Linganore Elementary School, 2025

During the 2017 legislative session, Folden introduced a bill that would provide state funding to and relax restrictions on the state's charter schools.

=== Environment ===
During the 2025 legislative session, Folden supported legislation to repeal Maryland's statewide fracking ban.

=== Housing ===
During the 2017 legislative session, Folden introduced a bill that would allow military members to end their housing leases early if deployed or called to a new duty station. The bill passed the House of Delegates unanimously.

In August 2026, during debate on a proposed constitutional amendment on redistricting, Folden introduced an amendment that would prevent any residential property assessment increases unless a property was sold or refinanced.

=== Guns ===
In January 2018, Folden said he supported a bill that would prohibit people convicted of domestic abuse from having access to firearms.

=== National politics ===
During the 2016 Republican Party presidential primaries, Folden endorsed Ted Cruz and served on the Cruz for Maryland Leadership Team.

In February 2026, Folden said he opposed pursuing mid-decade redistricting in Maryland and opposed holding a vote on a bill that would redraw Maryland's congressional districts to improve the Democratic Party's chances of winning the 1st congressional district, the only congressional district held by Republicans in the state.

=== Policing ===
In July 2015, following the Baltimore protests earlier that year, Folden sent a letter to the co-chairs of the Public Safety and Policing Work Group requesting that Baltimore mayor Stephanie Rawlings-Blake testify about the city's tactical response.

During the 2017 legislative session, Folden introduced a bill that would create the Maryland Police Training Commission to develop a lethality screening protocol and training to use when investigating complains of domestic violence and assault by strangulation, which was signed by Governor Larry Hogan in May 2016.

During the 2018 legislative session, Folden introduced a bill that would train emergency responders on how to properly handle interactions with veterans affected by trauma.

During the 2026 legislative session, Folden opposed a bill that would prohibit police officers from wearing masks while on duty with exceptions for officers involved in undercover operations, saying that masked federal officers "are trying to actually find a way to protect themselves and their families from being doxed by certain activists who make it their mission to cause disruption [...] in the performance of their duties". He also voted against legislation to prohibit counties from entering into 287(g) program agreements with U.S. Immigration and Customs Enforcement (ICE) and another bill that would require ICE to present a judicial warrant to compel state action.

=== Social issues ===
During the 2017 legislative session, Folden voted against a joint resolution that would allow the Attorney General of Maryland to file lawsuits against the federal government, saying that he opposed the expanded powers because the Attorney General did not have these powers when they were elected.

In October 2018, Folden called for an independent review of complaints against Frederick Community College president Elizabeth Burmaster, which claimed that she had been verbally and physically abusive toward faculty and administrators at the college. Later that month, the community college board of trustees voted to request an investigation into the complaints.

=== Transportation ===
During the 2017 legislative session, Folden introduced a bill that would make it illegal to drive in the far left lane of a highway unless the driver was passing another vehicle. The bill passed the House of Delegates by a 73-66 vote, but failed to move in the state senate. Folden reintroduced the bill during the 2018 legislative session, where it failed to move out of committee.

== Personal life ==
Folden is married and has three children.

== Electoral history ==
Frederick County Sheriff Republican primary election, 2006
Party	Candidate	Votes	%
Republican	Chuck Jenkins	6,256	39.39
Republican	Harold L. Domer Jr.	5,271	33.19
Republican	William G. Folden	3,360	21.16
Republican	Thomas Johann	995	6.26

Maryland House of Delegates District 3B Republican primary election, 2014
Party	Candidate	Votes	%
Republican	William "Bill" Folden	1,566	54.0
Republican	Darren Shay Wigfield	1,334	46.0

Maryland House of Delegates District 3B election, 2014
Party	Candidate	Votes	%
Republican	William "Bill" Folden	7,522	56.3
Democratic	Stephen Slater	5,818	43.6
Write-in		18	0.1

Maryland House of Delegates District 3B election, 2018
Party	Candidate	Votes	%
Democratic	Ken Kerr	10,091	52.4
Republican	William "Bill" Folden	9,168	47.6
Write-in		13	0.1

Maryland Senate District 4 Republican primary election, 2022
Party	Candidate	Votes	%
Republican	William Folden	9,060	71.8
Republican	Stephen Barrett	3,553	28.2

Maryland Senate District 4 election, 2022
Party	Candidate	Votes	%
Republican	William Folden	32,554	57.54
Democratic	Carleah M. Summers	23,967	42.36
Write-in		60	0.11
