= Julien P. Delphey =

American politician (1917–2009)

Member of the Maryland House of Delegates from the 3B district
- In office 1975–1982 Serving with C. Clifton Virts and James E. McClellan
- Preceded by: District established
- Succeeded by: Redistricting

Member of the Maryland House of Delegates from the Frederick County district
- In office 1971–1974 Serving with Wallace E. Hutton and C. Clifton Virts
- Preceded by: William M. Houck, E. Earl Remsberg, C. Clifton Virts
- Succeeded by: Redistricting

Personal details
- Born: December 16, 1917 Frederick, Maryland, U.S.
- Died: July 12, 2009 (aged 91) Baltimore, Maryland, U.S.
- Resting place: Mount Olivet Cemetery; Frederick, Maryland, U.S.
- Party: Republican
- Spouse: Laura Roe
- Children: 3
- Occupation: Politician; businessman

Julien P. Delphey (December 16, 1917 – July 12, 2009) was an American politician from Maryland. He served as a member of the Maryland House of Delegates, representing Frederick County and district 3B from 1971 to 1982.

== Early life ==
Julien P. Delphey was born on December 16, 1917, in Frederick, Maryland, to Ethel (née Hemp) and J. Paul Delphey. His father owned the sporting good store on West Patrick Street in Frederick called Delphey's Sports Store. He graduated from Frederick High School in 1937 and took various business and high education courses.

== Career ==
Delphey served three years in the Third Service Command of the United States Army Signal Corps during World War II at Edgewood Arsenal. After the war, he worked for his father in Delphey's Sports Store. He took over the business from his father until 1970. The store remained open until 1998.

Delphey was a Republican. He served as a member of the Maryland House of Delegates from 1971 to 1982. From 1971 to 1974, he represented Frederick County and from 1975 to 1982, he represented District 3B. He was chair of the Frederick County delegation and was a founding member of the Frederick County Republican Club.

Delphey was a real estate manager. He was a member of the Maryland Boat Act Advisory Committee and the Frederick County Advisory Board for Maryland National Bank. He was president and director of the Lions Club in Frederick and served as vice president of the Frederick County Chamber of Commerce. He was director of the Thurmont Conservation and Sportsman's Club. He was director of Frederick Memorial Hospital Home Care and director of Maryland National Bank. He was a member of the board of Mount Olivet Cemetery in Frederick.

== Personal life ==
Delphey married Laura Roe. They had three children, Jay Paul, Julia and Chester Grant. He was a member of Calvary United Memorial Church. He had a second home in Seneca, Maryland, where he fished and boated on the Potomac River. He had a 70 acres (28 ha) farm in Frederick County where he raised peacocks, buffalo, elk, deer and cattle.

Delphey died on July 12, 2009, in Baltimore. He was buried in Mount Olivet Cemetery in Frederick.
