= Tuscarora High School =

Tuscarora High School may refer to:

- Tuscarora High School (Maryland), a school in Frederick
- Tuscarora High School (Virginia), a school in Leesburg
