= Gary L. Utterback =

American politician (1889–1962)

Member of the Maryland House of Delegates from the Frederick County district
- In office 1955 – March 4, 1962 Serving with Melvin H. Derr, S. Fenton Harris, Joseph B. Payne, Charles H. Smelser, C. Clifton Virts, Charles E. Collins, William M. Houck, Charles Mathias
- Preceded by: Horace M. Alexander, Richard B. Baumgardner, John A. Derr, Melvin H. Derr, S. Fenton Harris, Joseph B. Payne, C. Clifton Virts
- Succeeded by: Joseph B. Payne

Member of the Maryland House of Delegates from the Frederick County district
- In office 1943–1947 Serving with Harold U. Frushour, Robert L. Grove, W. Jerome Offutt, Jacob R. Ramsburg, Richard E. Zimmerman
- Preceded by: Robert E. Clapp Jr., Donald J. Gardner, Charles S. Houck Jr., J. Tyson Lee, Jacob R. Ramsburg, Benjamin B. Rosenstock, Howard B. Smith
- Succeeded by: Horace M. Alexander, Melvin H. Derr, William E. Hauver, Joseph B. Payne, Jacob R. Ramsburg, C. Clifton Virts

Personal details
- Born: Gary Lewis Utterback; September 26, 1889 Burkittsville, Maryland, U.S.
- Died: March 4, 1962 (aged 72) near Charles Town, West Virginia, U.S.
- Resting place: Mount Olivet Cemetery; Frederick, Maryland, U.S.
- Party: Democratic
- Spouse: Sadie Haberkorn (m. 1913, died)
- Children: 1
- Occupation: Politician; farmer

Gary Lewis Utterback (September 26, 1889 – March 4, 1962) was an American politician from Maryland. He served as a member of the Maryland House of Delegates, representing Frederick County from 1943 to 1947 and from 1955 to 1962.

== Early life ==
Gary Lewis Utterback was born on September 26, 1889, in Burkittsville, Maryland, to Lillie (née Easterday) and Edward J. Utterback. He attended public schools in Frederick County.

== Career ==
Utterback was a Democrat. He served as a member of the Maryland House of Delegates, representing Frederick County, from 1943 to 1947 and from 1955 to 1962. He was a member of the agricultural and natural resources committee and was on a special legislative committee to study ice milk. He announced plans of running for re-election in 1962.

Utterback also worked as a farmer, though retired later in life. He was a scattergun marksman and competed in clay pigeon shoots. He was class B champion of the United States having won the title in Vandalia, Ohio. He was the Western Maryland champion four times and was county trap and skeet champion a few times.

== Personal life ==
Utterback married Sadie Haberkorn, daughter of John Haberkorn, on October 7, 1913. They had one daughter, Mrs. Nelson A. Strathern. His wife predeceased him. At the time of his death, he lived at 110 West 13th Street in Frederick. He was a member of the Evangelical Lutheran Church in Frederick and was superintendent of Sunday school there for several years.

Utterback died following a heart attack on March 4, 1962, during a meeting of the Isaac Walton League, a sportsmen's club, near Charles Town, West Virginia. He was buried at Mount Olivet Cemetery in Frederick.
