= Frederick High School (Maryland) =

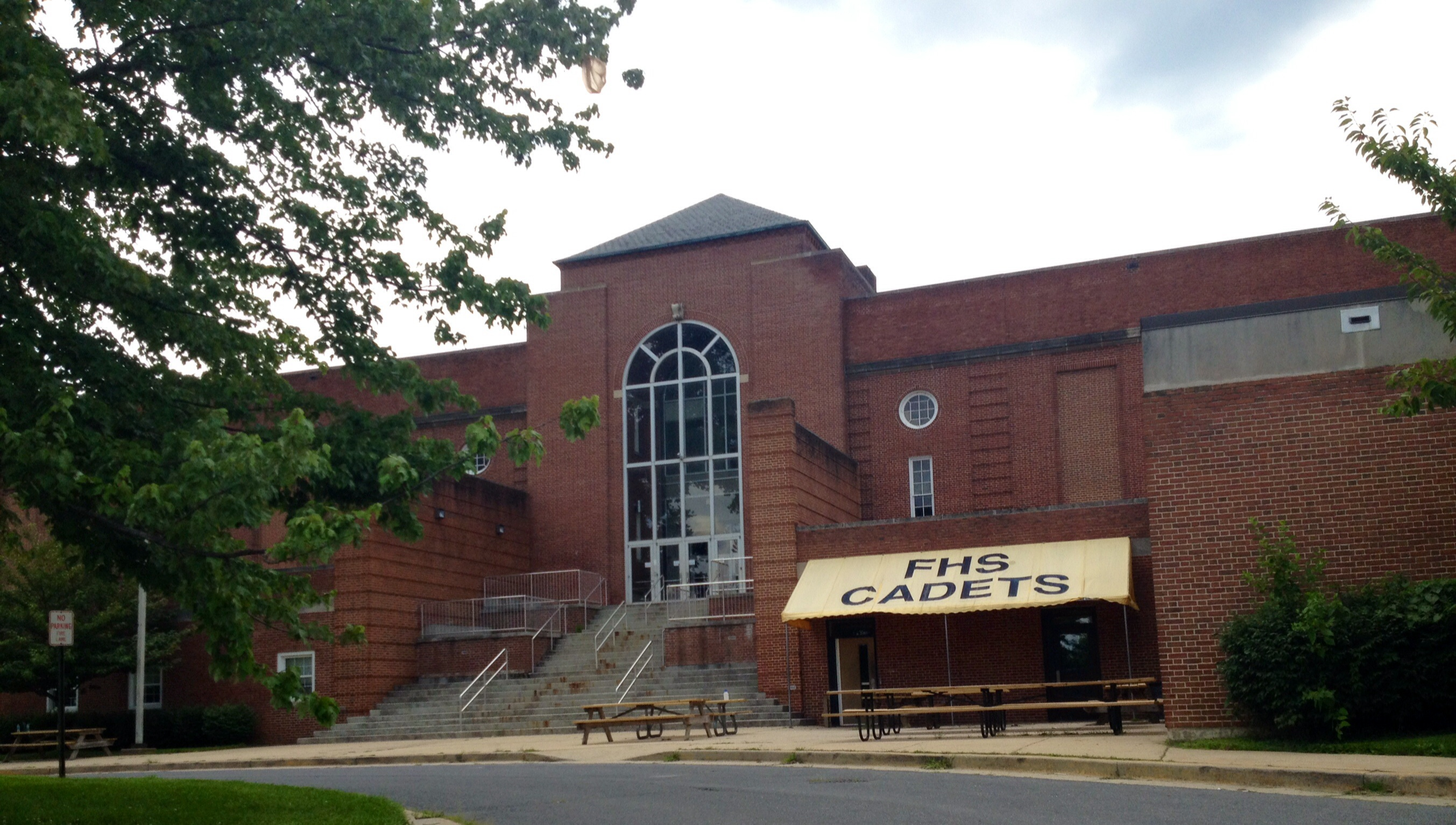
- The former Frederick High School building prior to its demolition in 2018

Location
- 650 Carroll Parkway Frederick; Frederick, Maryland 21701; United States; 39°25′00″N 77°25′34″W

Information
- Type: Public high school
- Motto: "Enter To Learn, Go Forth To Serve"
- Established: 1891
- School district: Frederick County Public Schools
- Principal: Sheri Murphy
- Teaching staff: 82.50 (FTE)
- Grades: 9–12
- Enrollment: 1,455 (2017–18)
- Student to teacher ratio: 17.64
- Campus: Small city
- Campus size: 12 acres (49,000 m^{2})
- Colours: Black and gold
- Slogan: Big Fred, SABRE Nation
- Nickname: Cadets
- Rival: Thomas Johnson High School
- Newspaper: The High Flyer
- Yearbook: The Last Word
- Feeder schools: West Frederick Middle School & Crestwood Middle School (split)
- Website: fhs.sites.fcps.org

Frederick High School (FHS) is a four-year public high school in the city of Frederick in Frederick County, Maryland, United States. A National Blue Ribbon School of Excellence, Frederick High is the oldest school in Frederick County, the school's diverse population reflects its surrounding dynamic community. Frederick High School opened in 1891 with girls and boys attending school in different buildings and matriculation occurring after three years. The former facility opened in 1939 and was demolished in 2018, with the current building opening in the fall of 2018. The school serves the city of Frederick along with Governor Thomas Johnson High School and Tuscarora High School.

== History ==
The Board of Education identified the modernization of older schools as a priority in the capital improvement program. A recent facility assessment study evaluated the physical condition of Frederick County Schools, as well as the ability to provide the current required curriculum. Frederick High was ranked highest in priority for high schools needing a complete renovation/modernization.

The school is located at 650 Carroll Parkway in historic downtown Frederick City. It is just north of Maryland Route 144, east of U.S. 15, south of West 2nd Street, and east of West College Terrace. Frederick High School was initially constructed in 1939 with additions in 1955, 1967, 1977 and 1980. Approximately one third of the building was renovated in 1977. While a few systemic improvements have been made to the school such as roof repairs, no other significant renovations had occurred in almost 35 years. The building had 204,694 square feet (19,016.7 m^{2}) of space located on 12 acres (4.9 ha) of land.

In the summer of 2012 a feasibility study was begun to explore options to renovate FHS. The Board of Education unanimously voted to allow students to remain in the current 1939 building while constructing a new school on the Frederick campus. The first step in the modernization of Frederick High was to perform a feasibility study. The purpose of the feasibility study was to identify school facility renovation/modernization needs and the cost of meeting those needs.

The study was completed in December 2012 and in February 2013, the Board of Education approved Option Number 5 to construct a new facility on the existing site located on the existing parking lot to the west of the existing building. Option 5 received approval from the Designees of the Interagency Committee on School Construction in February 2011.

The new Frederick High has a capacity for 1,826 students. The building has been designed to meet LEED silver standards for environmentally friendly operations. The new Frederick High will cost more than $114 million, according to numbers released by FCPS.

=== Demographics ===
Frederick High School is one of the most diverse high schools in Maryland and its demographic breakdown as of 2020–2021 is

Ethnicity	% of population
American Indian/Alaskan Native	0.2%
Asian	6.7%
African American	25.5%
Hawaiian/Other Pacific Islander	0.4%
Hispanic	38.1%
White	25.2%
Two or More Races	4%
Total Minority Enrollment	74.9%

== Population ==
The school's population had been steadily rising until 2003 when Tuscarora High School opened in southern Frederick.

Student population
1993	1994	1995	1996	1997	1998	1999	2000	2001	2002	2003	2004	2005	2006	2007	2008	2009	2010	2011	2012	2020
1,697	1,752	1,782	1,795	1,799	1,811	1,738	1,782	1,870	1,950	1,957	1,541	1,403	1,240	1,320	1,335	1,346	1,343	1,348	1,386	1,542

Approximately 90% of students attend four-year college, business, technical schools or community college. Frederick High's SAT scores continue to outdistance the average of those in the state of Maryland and the nation. Frederick High School's graduation rate has been steady over the past 12 years. In 2007 the school graduated 92.75%, the highest rate since 1993 when it reached 93.35%, up from a low of 90.65% in 2004. The AP participation rate at Frederick High is 40 percent. The student body makeup is 51 percent male and 49 percent female.

== Notable alumni ==
- Deborah Boardman - district judge
- Julien P. Delphey (1917–2009), member of the Maryland House of Delegates
- Chuck Foreman – former NFL player
- David Gallaher - award-winning author, graphic novelist and video game writer
- Charlie Keller – former MLB player (New York Yankees, Detroit Tigers)
- Lefty Kreh - fly fishing icon
- Don Loun – former MLB player (Washington Senators)
- Senator Charles "Mac" Mathias – former United States Senator
- Derrick Miller - US Army Sergeant sentenced to life in prison for premeditated murder of Afghan civilian during battlefield interrogation; granted parole and released after 8 years
- Alex X. Mooney – U.S. Congressman
- Ronald N. Young – Mayor of Frederick 1974–1990, State Senator 2011–2023
- Soon Hee Newbold – musician, composer, and conductor
- Bobby Steggert – actor, nominated for the Best Performance by a Featured Actor in a Play Tony Award for his role in Ragtime

== Sports ==
State Champions

- 2024 - Boys' Basketball
- 2019 - Girls' Basketball
- 2018 - Girls' Basketball
- 2017 - Girls' Track & Field
- 2017 - Girls' Basketball
- 2015 – Unified Bocce
- 2011 – Girls' Basketball
- 2011 – Girls' Swimming
- 2010 – Unified Track & Field
- 2010 – Girls' Swimming
- 2009 – Baseball
- 1996 – Girls' Indoor Track
- 1996 – Girls' Track & Field
- 1996 – Boys' Wrestling
- 1995 – Girls' Cross Country
- 1994 – Boys' Wrestling
- 1989 – Girls' Cross Country
- 1986 – Boys' Track & Field
- 1983 – Girls' Indoor Track
- 1983 – Girls' Track & Field
- 1982 – Boys' Basketball
- 1982 – Girls' Indoor Track
- 1982 – Girls' Track & Field
- 1981 – Boys' Cross Country B
- 1981 – Girls' Indoor Track
- 1981 – Girls' Track & Field
- 1980 – Girls' Indoor Track
- 1980 – Girls' Track & Field
- 1979 – Girls' Track & Field
- 1978 – Boys' Basketball
- 1974 – Boys' Basketball
- 1972 – Boys' Golf
- 1970 – Boys' Track & Field
- 1969 – Football
- 1969 – Boys' Track & Field
- 1968 – Boys' Track & Field
- 1967 – Boys' Basketball
- 1967 – Boys' Track & Field
- 1962 – Boys' Track & Field
- 1957 – Boys' Basketball
- 1952 – Football
- 1917 – Football
- 1915 – Football

== See also ==
- List of high schools in Maryland
- Frederick County Public Schools
