= Charles A. Jenkins =

American politician (born 1962)

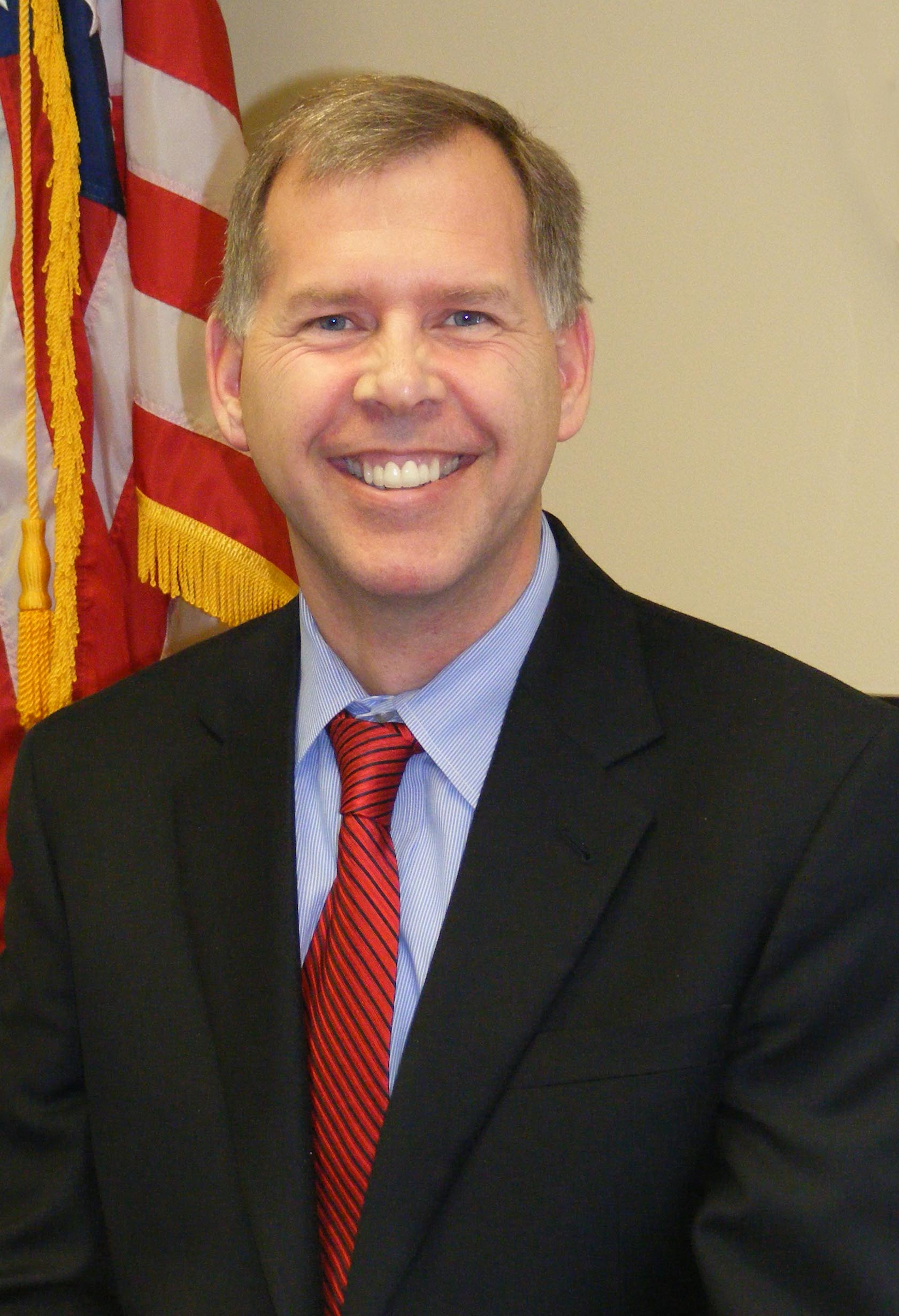

Member of the Maryland House of Delegates from the 3B district
- In office January 13, 2010 – January 12, 2011
- Preceded by: Richard B. Weldon Jr.
- Succeeded by: Michael Hough
- Constituency: Frederick & Washington Counties

Frederick County Commission
- In office December 2006 – January 2010

Personal details
- Born: December 18, 1962 (age 63) Norfolk, Virginia, U.S.
- Party: Republican
- Spouse: Delly
- Children: 2
- Education: James Madison University
- Profession: Real estate agent

Charles A. Jenkins (born December 18, 1962) is a former member of the Maryland House of Delegates representing Maryland District 3B, which covered Frederick and Washington County, Maryland. He was appointed by Governor Martin O'Malley to fill the vacancy created by Richard B. Weldon Jr.'s resignation.

Prior to being appointed to the Maryland House of Delegates, Charles Jenkins was a member of the Board of County Commissioners in Frederick County, Maryland, a position he held since December 2006. In this position he was the board liaison to the Commission on Aging of Frederick County, the Frederick Municipal Airport Commission, the Frederick County Volunteer Fire Department, the Frederick Area Committee for Transportation, and the Metropolitan Washington Council of Governments where he served as the Chairman of the Transportation Planning Board from 2009 to 2010.

In addition to his position on the Board of County Commissioners, Jenkins was also the chair of the National Capital Region Transportation Planning Board from 2008 until 2010. From 1983 until 1987 he was a member of the United States Navy serving as a cryptologist. During his service in the military he received the Navy Achievement Medal and the Joint Services Achievement Medal.

From 2003 to 2011, Delegate Jenkins was a realtor for Re/Max. Since January 2011, Delegate Jenkins is the owner/broker of Charles Jenkins Signpost Realty. In 2018 he began All American Signs, a real estate service company installing sign posts & panels for Central Maryland Realtors.

== Education ==
Delegate Jenkins graduated from James Madison University in 1990 with a bachelor's degree in Russian Language.

== In the legislature ==
To see a list of bills sponsored and co-sponsored by Delegate Jenkins:

Delegate Jenkins' Sponsored and Co-Sponsored Legislation
