= Wallace E. Hutton =

American politician (1929–2016)

Member of the Maryland House of Delegates from the Frederick County district
- In office 1971–1974 Serving with Julien P. Delphey and C. Clifton Virts
- Preceded by: William M. Houck, E. Earl Remsberg, C. Clifton Virts
- Succeeded by: New district

Personal details
- Born: May 6, 1929 Yonkers, New York, U.S.
- Died: December 6, 2016 (aged 78) Fort Myers, Florida, U.S.
- Party: Democratic
- Spouse: Portia Lyon
- Children: 2
- Education: Indiana University Bloomington (BA); George Washington University Law School (JD)
- Occupation: Politician; lawyer

Wallace E. Hutton (May 6, 1929 – December 6, 2016) was an American politician and lawyer from Maryland. He served as a member of the Maryland House of Delegates from 1971 to 1974.

== Early life ==
Wallace E. Hutton was born on May 6, 1929, in Yonkers, New York. He attended schools in Illinois, Indiana, and Montgomery County, Maryland, public schools, including Bethesda-Chevy Chase High School. He graduated with a Bachelor of Arts in journalism and literature from Indiana University Bloomington in 1950. He graduated with a Juris Doctor from George Washington University Law School in 1956. He was admitted to the bar in 1956. He was a member of Pi Kappa Phi and Phi Alpha Delta.

== Career ==
Hutton served in the United States Army. He served in the Korean War as an infantry lieutenant. He returned from the conflict in 1952. He was a member of the United States Army Reserve and attained the rank of lieutenant colonel in the Judge Advocate General's Corps. He had a fellowship in Washington, D.C., to study the United States Congress granted by the American Political Science Association from 1963 to 1964. During the fellowship, he worked in the offices of Carl Albert and Alan Bible. He worked as a lawyer in Washington, D.C., Montgomery and Washington County. He worked with the Federal Communications Commission for nine years. In 1965, he joined the firm managed by Edward D. Storm and Samuel W. Barrick near Frederick.

Hutton was county commissioner of Frederick County from 1966 to 1970. Hutton was a Democrat. He served as a member of the Maryland House of Delegates, representing Frederick County, from 1971 to 1974.

Hutton was a manager of legal services at the Office of Maryland Comptroller of the Treasury.

== Personal life and death ==
Hutton married Portia Lyon of Sheridan, Indiana. They had two sons, Brock and Shane. He and his wife were both private pilots who flew out of Frederick Municipal Airport. He lived in Bethesda for over 20 years before moving to Frederick.

Hutton died on December 6, 2016, at the age of 78.
