= Charlie Jenkins (Australian rules footballer) =

Australian rules footballer

Personal information
- Full name: Charles Herbert Jenkins
- Born: 17 June 1878; Carlton, Victoria
- Original team: West Melbourne
- Position: Forward

Playing career^{1}
Years	Club	Games (Goals)
1898	Fitzroy	8 (0)
- ^{1} Playing statistics correct to the end of 1898.

Charles Herbert Jenkins (born 17 June 1878) was an Australian rules footballer who played with Fitzroy in the Victorian Football League.
