= Richard B. Weldon Jr. =

American politician (born 1958)

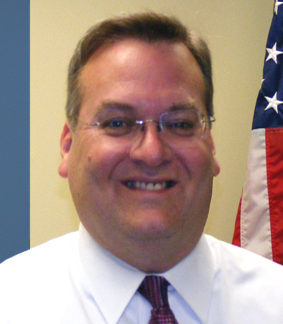

Member of the Maryland House of Delegates from the 3B district
- In office January 8, 2003 – December 17, 2009
- Preceded by: Sue Hecht
- Succeeded by: Charles A. Jenkins
- Constituency: Frederick & Washington Counties

Personal details
- Born: September 26, 1958 (age 67) Wilmington, Delaware, U.S.
- Party: Independent
- Spouse: Amy
- Children: 3
- Profession: President/CEO, United Way of Frederick County

Richard Weldon (born September 26, 1958) was a member of the Maryland House of Delegates representing Maryland District 3B, which then included parts of Frederick and Washington County, Maryland. He defeated Lisa Baugher in 2002 for the new 3B district. He defeated Paul Gilligan in 2006 to retain his seat.

== Education ==
Weldon graduated from William Penn High School in New Castle, Delaware and briefly attended the University of Maryland. Weldon also attended a number of technical schools and formal training courses during his 4-year service in the US Naval Submarine Service.

== Career ==
Weldon served in the United States Navy from 1976 to 1980 in the submarine service. We later worked as a civilian employee within the Navy Department from 1982 to 1994. From 1994 to 1999, he was a city administrator for the City of Brunswick. In 1999, he became the chief operations officer for the city of Frederick. After a brief stint in 2001 as a member of the Board of County Commissioners for Frederick County, he ran for the House of Delegates. Weldon serves as the president and CEO of United Way of Frederick County.

In September 2008, Delegate Weldon announced that he was changing his registration from Republican to unaffiliated and would not seek reelection in 2010 for the term beginning in 2011.

== In the legislature ==
Delegate Weldon, in the House of Delegates from January 8, 2003, to December 17, 2009, was a member of the House Health and Government Operations Committee and the government operations and public health/long-term care subcommittees.

== Controversy ==
In June 2009, Delegate Weldon raised concern with a few people in the community by supporting convicted sex offender Samn Huffer, who was directing a local theater production, "Annie," performed by The Fredericktowne Players. Weldon was taking part in the production as an actor, along with several children and dozens of other adults, many parents of children also in the production. Despite the nature of Huffer's recent child pornography and drug convictions, Weldon maintained that Huffer's involvement was justified, and even asserted that he "would have allowed his own children to be in the play with him (Huffer) if they were still young. Huffer had fulfilled his sentence and all obligations to the state, and also had previously directed another show with children in the cast. In spite of the clamoring of some, the production was widely hailed as a success. " Weldon resigned his seat in the House of Delegates on December 17, 2009.

=== Legislative notes ===
- 2004 Legislator of the Year- Maryland State Fireman's Association
- 2008 State Legislator of the Year- GrandFamilies of America
- 2009 Public Policy Champion- Maryland Works, Inc.
- voted for slots in 2005 (HB1361)
- voted against in-state tuition for illegal immigrants in 2007 (HB6)
- voted to expand access to healthcare (HB6)- served on the Joint Conference Committee during the Special Session 2007
- Sponsored Relative Caregiver Act
- Sponsored the Long-Term Consolidation Plan Act in 2008
- Served as a House liaison to the Rural Maryland Council from 2003–present
- Served on the Procurement Reform Task Force in 2004
- Chairman of the Frederick County Legislative Delegation- 2005-2008
- Member of the Joint Committee on Federal Relations
- Member of the Joint Oversight Committee on Quality of Care in Nursing Homes
- Chaired a Special House Workgroup on EMS Medical Protocols for the Medevac helicopter issue during the 2008 Session

== Election results ==
- 2006 Race for Maryland State House – District 3B

Voters to choose one:

Name	Votes	Percent	Outcome
Richard B. Weldon Jr., Rep.	10,057	61.4%	Won
Paul Gilligan, Dem.	6,317	38.6%	Lost

- 2002 Race for Maryland State House – District 3B

Voters to choose one:

Name	Votes	Percent	Outcome
Richard B. Weldon Jr., Rep.	8,819	62.38%	Won
Lisa Baugher, Dem.	5,281	37.36%	Lost
Other Write-Ins	37	0.26%	Lost
