= Charles F. Jenkins (Quaker) =

American Quaker and historian (1865–1951)

Charles Francis Jenkins by Fabian Bachrach

Charles Francis Jenkins (17 December 1865 – July 2, 1951) was an American Quaker and historian.

== Early life ==
Jenkins was born in Norristown, Pennsylvania, on 17 December 1865. He lived in Wilmington, Delaware, and West Chester, Pennsylvania, where he completed his basic education. He did not attend college.

== Career ==
Jenkins's early career was at the Farm Journal, which had been founded by his uncle Wilmer Atkinson.

He was a member and president of the Buck Hill Falls Company for fifty years, and a member and president of the Board of Managers of Swarthmore College for forty years.

Jenkins was elected to the American Philosophical Society in 1944.

He was a noted horticulturist who collected hemlocks and created the Hemlock Arboretum at his home in Germantown and campaigned to have the plant selected as the state tree of Pennsylvania.

== Death and legacy ==
Jenkins died in 1951.

== Selected publications ==
- Quaker Poems; A Collection of Verse Relating to the Society of Friends. John C. Winston, Philadelphia, 1893.
- From Philadelphia to the Poconos: A Guide to the Delaware Valley and the Delaware Water Gap (1902)
- The Guide Book to Historic Germantown. Germantown, 1902.
- The People's Party in the Twenty-second Ward (1905)
- Washington in Germantown: Being an account of the various visits of the commander-in-chief and first president to Germantown, Pennsylvania. William J. Campbell, Philadelphia, 1905.
- Jefferson's Germantown Letters, Together with other papers relating to his stay in Germantown during the month of November, 1793. William J. Campbell, Philadelphia, 1906.
- Lafayette's visit to Germantown, July 20, 1825. William J. Campbell, Philadelphia, 1911.
- Tortola: A Quaker Experiment of Long Ago in the Tropics. 1923.
- Button Gwinnett, Signer of the Declaration of Independence (1926, 1974)
