= Chuck Jenkins =

American politician (born 1956)

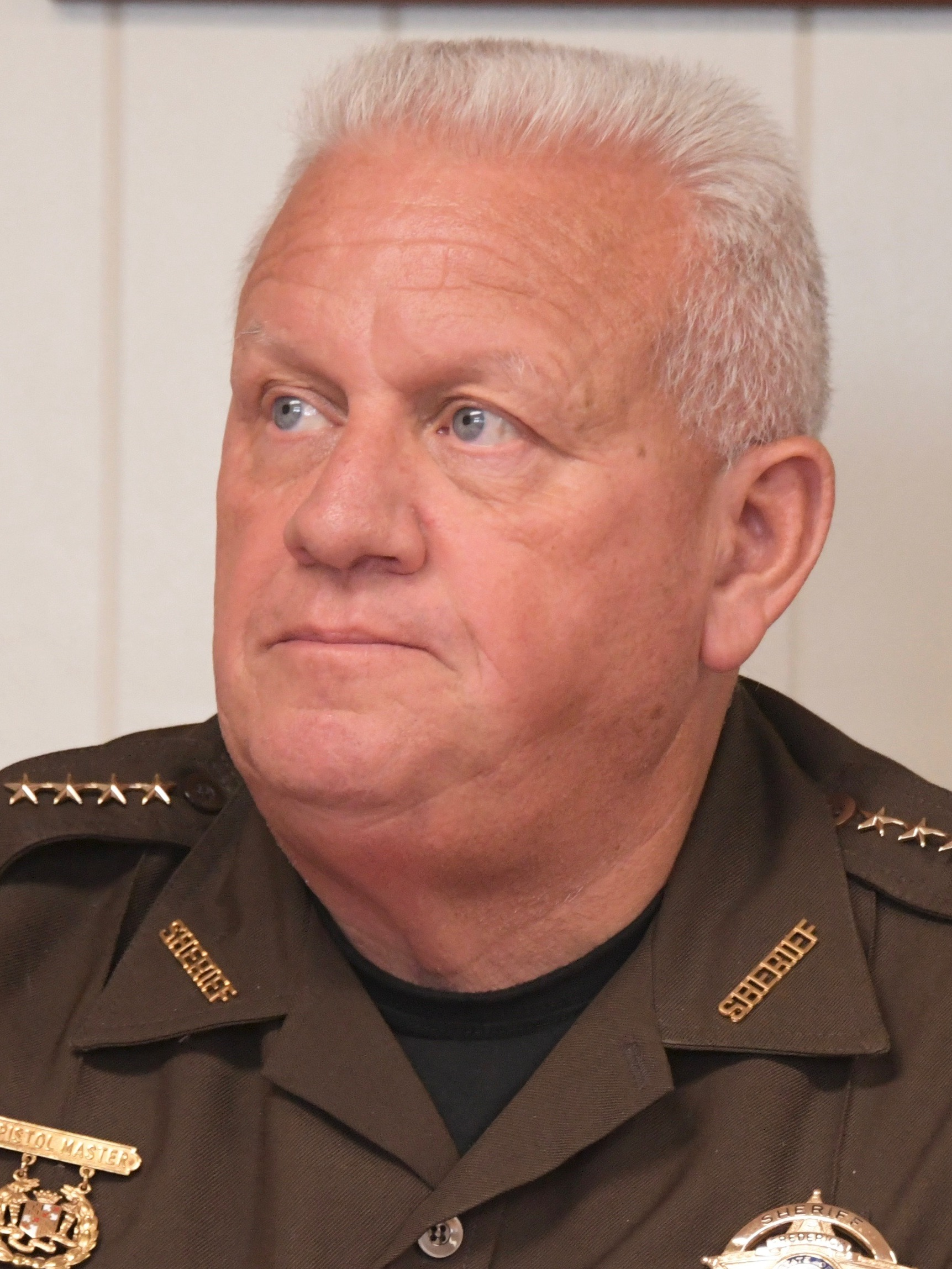
- Jenkins in 2018

Sheriff of Frederick County
- Incumbent
- Assumed office December 1, 2006
- Preceded by: James W. Hagy

Personal details
- Born: May 27, 1956 (age 70) Frederick, Maryland, U.S.
- Party: Republican
- Spouse: Shari
- Children: 2

Charles Austin Jenkins (born May 27, 1956) is an American politician who has served as the sheriff of Frederick County since 2006. A member of the Republican Party, he is the longest serving sheriff in Frederick County history.

Jenkins is part of the far-right. During his tenure as sheriff, he has been noted for his anti-immigrant views and defense of Frederick County's 287(g) program to deport arrested individuals, which he credited with decreasing crime in the county. In April 2023, Jenkins was indicted on five counts of conspiracy and making false statements to acquire machine guns, prompting him to take a temporary leave of absence from his duties as sheriff. Federal prosecutors dropped all charges against Jenkins in November 2024, after co-defendant Robert Krop was acquitted of all charges.

== Early life, education, and career ==
Jenkins was born in Frederick, Maryland, on May 27, 1956, to father Gordon Jenkins and mother Joy Marie Jenkins. He graduated from Frederick High School.

Before entering into law enforcement, Jenkins worked for COMSAT. He has worked with the Frederick County Sheriff's Office during his entire law enforcement career, first working as a deputy sheriff in his early thirties for about three years before working in the patrol division and criminal investigations unit from 1990 to 2006.

== Frederick County Sheriff ==
=== Elections ===
==== 2006 ====
On June 2, 2006, Jenkins announced that he would run for Frederick County Sheriff, seeking to succeed Jim Hagy, who announced that he would not run for re-election to a fourth term. He won the Republican nomination with 39.4% of the vote and defeated Democratic challenger Charles Tobery with 59% of the vote.

==== 2010 ====
Jenkins ran for re-election to a second term unopposed.

==== 2014 ====
Jenkins was re-elected to a third term in 2014, defeating Democratic challenger Karl Bickel with 62.8% of the vote and becoming the second Frederick County Sheriff to serve three consecutive terms.

==== 2018 ====
Jenkins was re-elected to a fourth term in 2018, defeating Democratic challenger Karl Bickel with 51.9% of the vote.

==== 2022 ====
Jenkins was re-elected to a fifth term in 2022, defeating Democratic challenger Karl Bickel with 51.4% of the vote and becoming the first Frederick County Sheriff to serve for a fifth term.

==== 2026 ====
Jenkins ran for a sixth term in 2026, but was defeated in the general election by Democratic challenger Karl Bickel.

=== Tenure ===
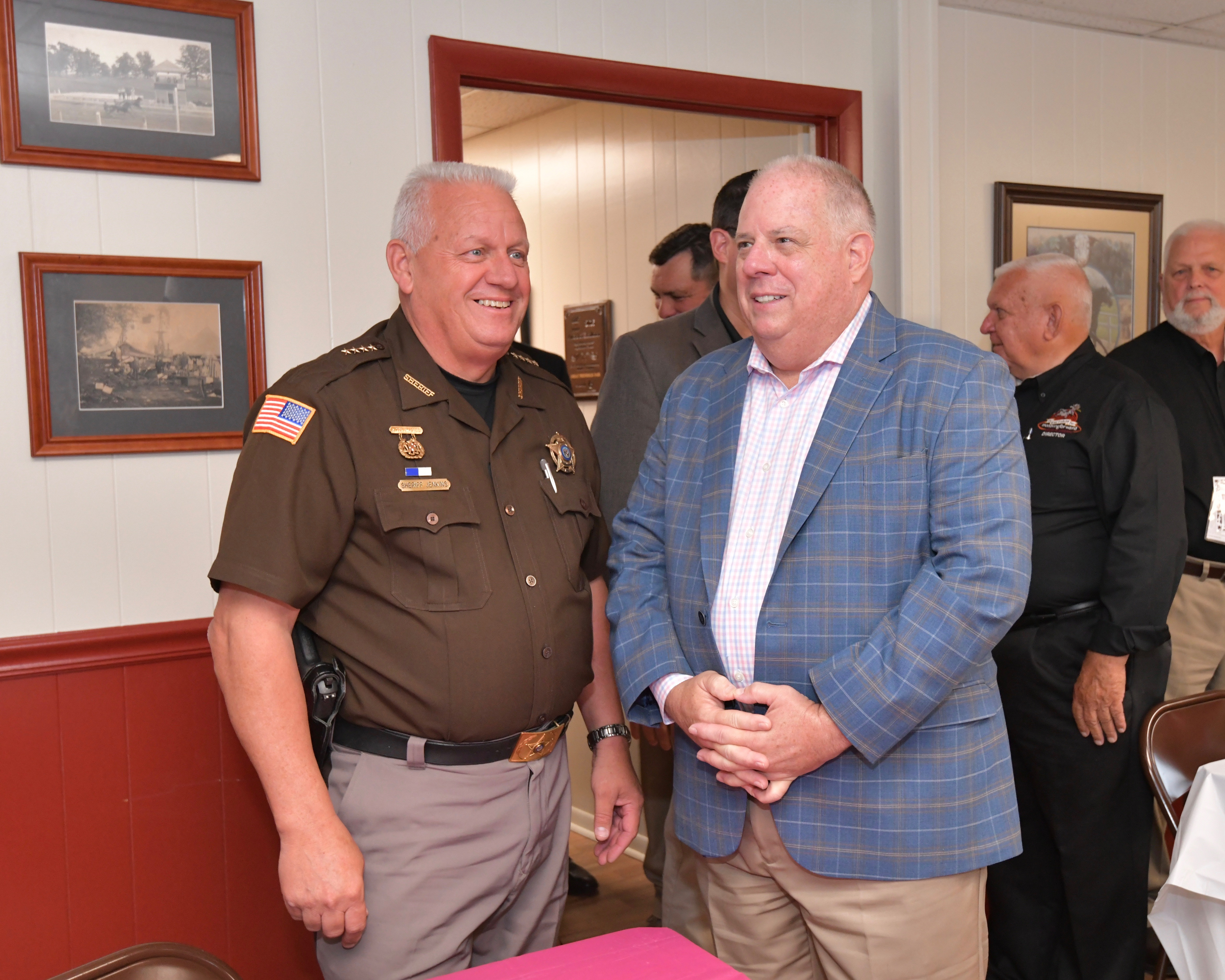
Jenkins with Maryland governor Larry Hogan, 2018

Jenkins was sworn in as sheriff on December 1, 2006. According to the Southern Poverty Law Center (SPLC), he is a member of Protect America Now and the Constitutional Sheriffs and Peace Officers Association, two "constitutional sheriff" groups, and has participated in several CSPOA activities. Jenkins is also a member of the National Sheriffs' Association and was asked to be a member of the organization's immigration subcommittee in 2009. During his tenure as sheriff, the crime rates in Frederick County declined by 50%, in line with statewide and national trends.

Jenkins opposed an executive order signed by President Barack Obama limiting the federal 1033 program, which allows police departments to receive surplus military equipment from the government, saying that he viewed the term "militarized police" as political rhetoric that unfairly castigates law enforcement. In March 2016, he purchased a Lenco BearCat for the Frederick County Sheriff’s Department, saying that Sen Bernardino sheriff John McMahon convinced him to buy the vehicle after discussing the 2015 San Bernardino attack with him.

Jenkins supported Donald Trump in the 2016 United States presidential election, describing "open borders" as his top issue in the election and criticizing Democratic nominee Hillary Clinton for wanting to "resettle hundreds of thousands of unvetted refugees here". He has falsely claimed that the 2020 United States presidential election was stolen.

During the 2014 legislative session, Jenkins opposed a bill to decriminalize marijuana, calling marijuana a "gateway drug". In November 2015, he opposed medical marijuana and dismissed proponents' arguments that the drug helps those with diseases and disorders, saying that he felt that the legalization of medical marijuana would eventually lead to the legalization of recreational marijuana. In October 2022, he said he opposed Question 4, a statewide referendum on legalizing recreational marijuana in Maryland, saying that he felt that legalization would take Maryland down a "bad road" and increase impaired driving incidents.

In March 2020, following state orders imposing restrictions on large gathering amid the COVID-19 pandemic, Jenkins urged residents to notify first responders if they have COVID-19 or suspect that they are infected with the virus. The sheriff's office also suspended most volunteer activities and fingerprinting services at the county's Law Enforcement Center, and implemented protocols at the county's detention center to limit the spread of the virus among inmates. In December 2021, Jenkins opposed incentivizing people to get the COVID-19 vaccine, saying that he felt that "trying to motivate someone to change their mind is absolutely wrong". In March 2022, he provided police escort for the People's Convoy, a group of truckers protesting COVID-19-related mandates.

In June 2020, Jenkins confronted demonstrators at a George Floyd protest outside of the Frederick Department of Public Works, where he took questions from the protest's leaders about the county police department's use of force statistics against Black and minority residents to the sheriff's policies on de-escalation and training. During a county council debate on police practices in November 2020, he said the way Floyd died was an "egregious, unreasonable, excessive use of force, unnecessary force", but disagreed that there was systemic racism in policing and called for increased funding for the county's police department. Jenkins opposed the Police Reform and Accountability Act, a police reform bill passed in 2021 that repealed the state's Law Enforcement Officers' Bill of Rights, regulated the types of force that police could use during arrests, and required counties to establish police accountability boards.

=== Views on illegal immigration ===
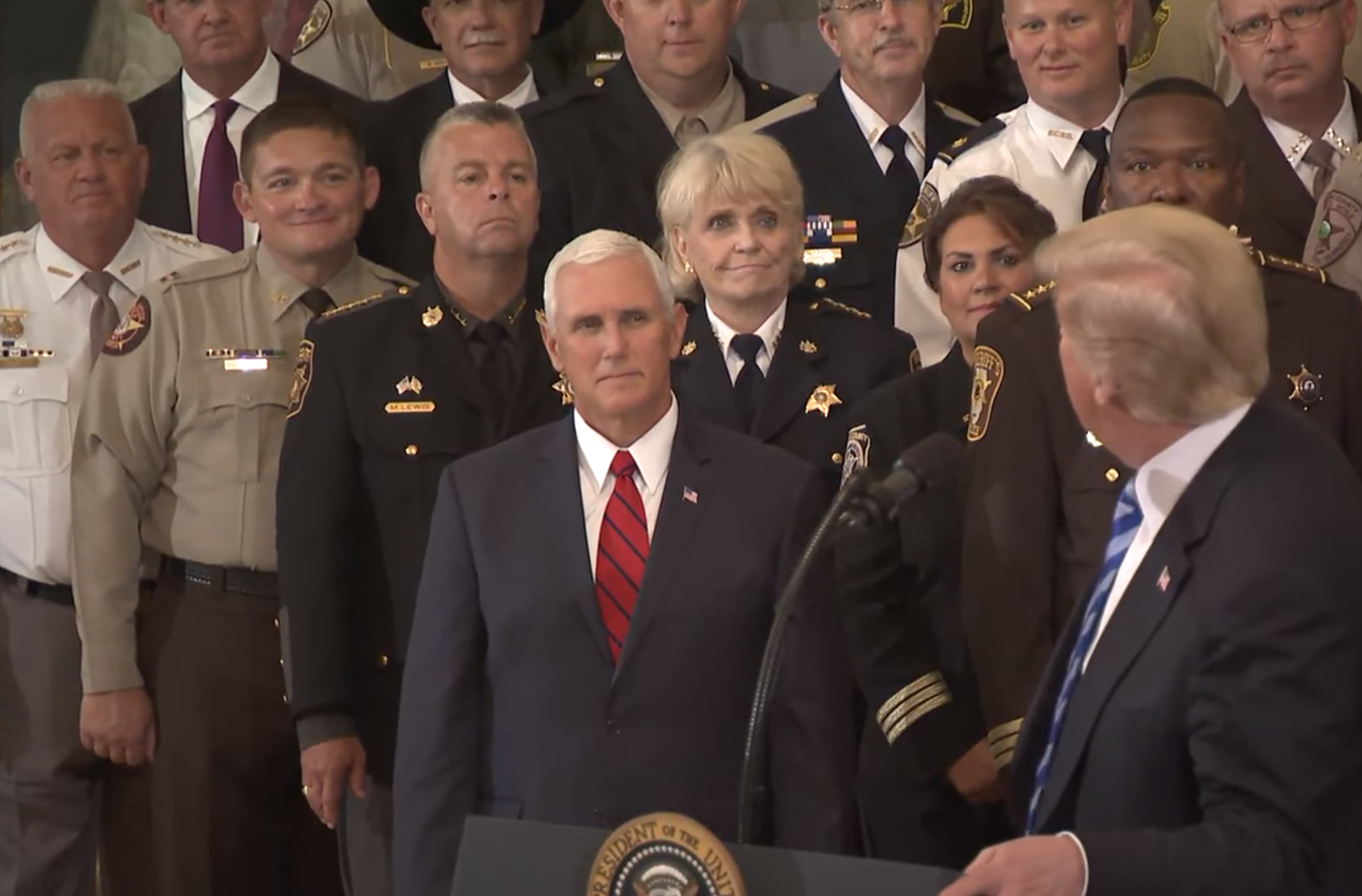
Jenkins (far left) attends a White House event on supporting law enforcement and fighting illegal immigration with President Donald Trump, September 2018

Jenkins has been noted for his anti-immigrant views, with Fox News once calling him the second-toughest sheriff on immigration in the country after Joe Arpaio. According to a legal brief by the American Civil Liberties Union, Jenkins has described "the immigration problem" as the nation's "single biggest threat", which he intended to solve by "shooting them right back" out of Frederick County.

According to former Frederick County NAACP chapter chair Guy Djoken, after he and representatives from CASA de Maryland and the Maryland ACLU met with Jenkins to discuss the implementation of the 287(g) program, Jenkins played a NumbersUSA video arguing that immigration levels to the U.S. should be cut by highlighting the populations of poorer nations in Asia, Africa, and Latin America. Jenkins confirmed that he played this video in a call with Bolts magazine, saying that he played the video to "show where we were headed as a country". In March 2009, he testified before the United States House Committee on Homeland Security that he entered into the program for national security, saying that he believed that crimes committed by illegal immigrants were "terrorism".

In July 2014, Jenkins traveled to the Mexico–United States border with six other elected sheriffs on a Federation for American Immigration Reform (FAIR) trip. After The Frederick News-Post reported on FAIR's association with Jenkins's trip and the group's status as a SPLC-recognized hate group, he criticized News-Post for describing FAIR as a "hate group" and refused to speak to the journalist who wrote the article describing it as such. Following the trip, Jenkins decried illegal immigration into the United States as an "invasion" and called for increased manpower along the border, potentially including the National Guard or U.S. military forces. He also blamed the Mexican government and cartels for increases in immigration into the United States, arguing that cartels were pushing criminals into the country and causing families to seek refuge. At the same time, Jenkins said he recognized the humanitarian needs involved in supporting families crossing the border. FAIR and Help Save Maryland later partnered with Jenkins to set up a statewide tour promoting 287(g) programs.

During the 2017 legislative session, Jenkins testified for a bill that would require state or local correctional facilities to notify the U.S. Department of Homeland Security that an inmate is subject to an immigration detainer. In 2018, he supported bills that would ban sanctuary cities and counties and require state and local detention centers to cooperate with ICE. In December 2018, Jenkins signed onto a letter published as a full-page ad in The Washington Post calling for full funding for the Mexico–United States border wall.

In October 2024, during a vigil for victims of the October 7 attacks, Jenkins likened undocumented immigrants to Hamas and suggested that there were terrorist groups waiting for do similar violence in the United States.

In December 2024, after former president Donald Trump won re-election in the 2024 United States presidential election, Jenkins said that his office would support Trump's deportation plan and hoped that Trump would bring back the "Task Force Model" policy of ICE's 287(g) program. From January to November 2025, Frederick County accounted for 64 of Maryland's 119 immigration-related arrests, the highest rate of arrests out of any Maryland county.

During the 2026 legislative session, Jenkins testified against a bill that would prohibit law enforcement from investigating or detaining someone for citizenship-related reasons and prohibit the notification or transfer of individuals to ICE without a warrant. He also opposed a bill that would require law enforcement to respond to ICE actions and keep a publicly available report—which would include details about the warrant, ICE officers, and amount of force and restrictions placed on law enforcement by ICE—and body camera recording of the action.

=== 287(g) program ===
Jenkins has repeatedly defended Frederick County's 287(g) program, contesting that the program contributed to a decrease in crime, denying allegations that the program has led to incidents involving racial discrimination and racial profiling, and rejected studies suggesting that the program led to distrust of law enforcement in the county's Hispanic community. The county's 287(g) program, which started in 2008, allows U.S. Immigration and Customs Enforcement (ICE) to train law enforcement officers to ask the immigration status of arrested individuals and has led to the deportation of 1,795 criminals as of March 2025, according to Jenkins.

In August 2019, Jenkins expressed disappointment with Frederick County executive Jan Gardner's decision to audit the county's 287(g) program, saying that he felt the audit showed that "the county executive and council don't trust my management authority". The audit published its final report in July 2020, which showed that the program only cost the county less than $22,000 a year; Jenkins accepted the audit as accurate, but called the report a waste of time.

During the 2021 legislative session, Jenkins opposed the Dignity Not Detention Act, which would prohibit counties from contracting with ICE to detain undocumented immigrants in county jails, saying that it would end the county's 287(g) agreement. Vaughn Stewart, the bill's sponsor, and the Attorney General of Maryland both said that the bill would not end the 287(g) agreement and would only prohibit jurisdictions from receiving any money for housing individuals in an immigration detention center. After the Maryland General Assembly voted to override Governor Larry Hogan's veto on the bill in December 2021, Jenkins said that the bill would not impact operations at Frederick County's detention center, which ceased detaining individual awaiting an immigration hearing in March 2020 amid the COVID-19 pandemic.

During the 2025 legislative session, Jenkins testified against the Maryland Values Act, which would prohibit counties from entering into 287(g) agreements with ICE. In the final moments of the 2025 legislative session, the Maryland Values Act was watered down by legislators to only provide assistance to "sensitive locations" on how to respond if immigration agents show and to provide some privacy protections for migrant data, after which it was passed by the Maryland General Assembly and signed into law by Governor Wes Moore. In December 2025, after state lawmakers reintroduced the bill to ban 287(g) agreements, Jenkins engaged in a campaign to bolster the program's reputation, arguing that it lowers ICE's workload and the likelihood of community immigration raids, and that banning the program would make Maryland a target for ICE street arrests. In February 2026, Jenkins said he would take legal action against the state if Governor Moore signed the 287(g) ban into law and pledged to continue communicating and working with ICE in whatever informal, legal capacity he could. Governor Moore signed the bill to ban 287(g) agreements into law on February 17, 2026, after which Frederick County terminated its 287(g) agreement with ICE.

In May 2026, Jenkins joined a lawsuit seeking to block the Community Trust Act, which would prohibit law enforcement agencies from holding immigrant detainees for ICE unless they present a judicial warrant, from going into effect.

=== Federal indictment ===
In April 2023, Jenkins and local firearms business owner Robert Krop were indicted by a federal grand jury on five counts of conspiracy and making false statements to acquire machine guns, alleging that Jenkins—on five different occasions from August 2015 to May 2022—signed letters to help Krop obtain machine guns to rent out to the public under the guise that the Frederick County Sheriff's Office wanted to see a demonstration of the guns. The indictments also alleged that Krop's business "offered political support to Jenkins" in exchange for the demonstration letters, though Maryland State Campaign Finance records show no campaign contributions from Krop or his business to Jenkins's campaign. Jenkins refused to resign following the indictment, adding that he was cooperating with the U.S. Department of Justice and the Bureau of Alcohol, Tobacco, Firearms and Explosives throughout their investigation, but did take a temporary leave of absence while facing federal charges.

Jenkins's attorneys claimed that he was deceived by Krop into providing him with demonstration letters and did not benefit from the alleged conspiracy, denied any evidence of a quid pro quo, and said that Jenkins "regretted" signing the demonstration letters that allowed Krop to obtain machine guns. Jenkins also filed to have his case tried separately from Krop's, arguing that his attorney, Dan Cox, was using "dangerous" legal strategies that would prejudice a jury against both of them, which was granted in August 2023.

Jenkins's trial was set to begin on January 27, 2025. However, after Krop was acquitted on all counts in his machine gun conspiracy case in October 2024, federal prosecutors dropped all charges against Jenkins. Jenkins compared his indictment to the attempted assassination of Donald Trump in Pennsylvania and accused the Department of Justice of trying to "ruin my reputation as sheriff" and "punish and financially destroy me, knowing very well I committed no crimes". In April 2025, he told The Baltimore Banner that he believes the federal charges were brought against him after he posed for a picture with U.S. representative Lauren Boebert, who was wearing a dress printed with "Let's Go Brandon", at Mar-a-Lago.

== Personal life ==
Jenkins met his future wife, Shari, while taking an emergency medical technician (EMT) test. He is married and has two children, a son and a daughter. He lives in Lewistown, Maryland.

== Electoral history ==
Frederick County Sheriff Republican primary election, 2006
Party	Candidate	Votes	%
Republican	Chuck Jenkins	6,256	39.4
Republican	Harold L. Domer Jr.	5,271	33.2
Republican	William Folden	3,360	21.2
Republican	Thomas Johann	995	6.3

Frederick County Sheriff election, 2006
Party	Candidate	Votes	%
Republican	Chuck Jenkins	41,710	59.4
Democratic	Chuck Tobery	28,547	40.6

Frederick County Sheriff election, 2010
Party	Candidate	Votes	%
Republican	Chuck Jenkins (incumbent)	56,479	98.2
Write-in		1,028	1.8

Frederick County Sheriff election, 2014
Party	Candidate	Votes	%
Republican	Chuck Jenkins (incumbent)	49,016	62.8
Democratic	Karl Bickel	28,931	37.1
Write-in		113	0.1

Frederick County Sheriff election, 2018
Party	Candidate	Votes	%
Republican	Chuck Jenkins (incumbent)	54,677	51.9
Democratic	Karl Bickel	50,540	48.0
Write-in		76	0.1

Frederick County Sheriff election, 2022
Party	Candidate	Votes	%
Republican	Chuck Jenkins (incumbent)	54,034	51.4
Democratic	Karl Bickel	51,084	48.6
Write-in		110	0.1

Civic offices
Preceded by James W. Hagy	Sheriff of Frederick County; 2006–present	Incumbent
