= James E. McClellan =

American veterinarian and politician (1926-2016)

Member of the Maryland House of Delegates from the 3B district
- In office 1979–1994

Personal details
- Born: March 22, 1926 Frederick, Maryland, U.S.
- Died: November 26, 2016 (aged 90) Frederick, Maryland, U.S.
- Party: Democratic
- Education: University of Maryland
- Alma mater: University of Georgia
- Military career
- Allegiance: United States
- Branch: United States Army
- Conflicts: World War II

James E. McClellan (March 22, 1926 – November 26, 2016) was an American veterinarian and politician.

Born in Frederick, Maryland, McClellan served in the United States Army during World War II. He went to University of Maryland and then received his bachelor's degree in veterinary medicine from University of Georgia in 1955. McClellan practiced veterinarian medicine in Frederick, Maryland. He served on the Frederick city council. From 1978 to 1994, McClellan represented District 3B in the Maryland House of Delegates and was a Democrat. McClellan died in Frederick, Maryland.
