= Tuscarora High School (Maryland) =

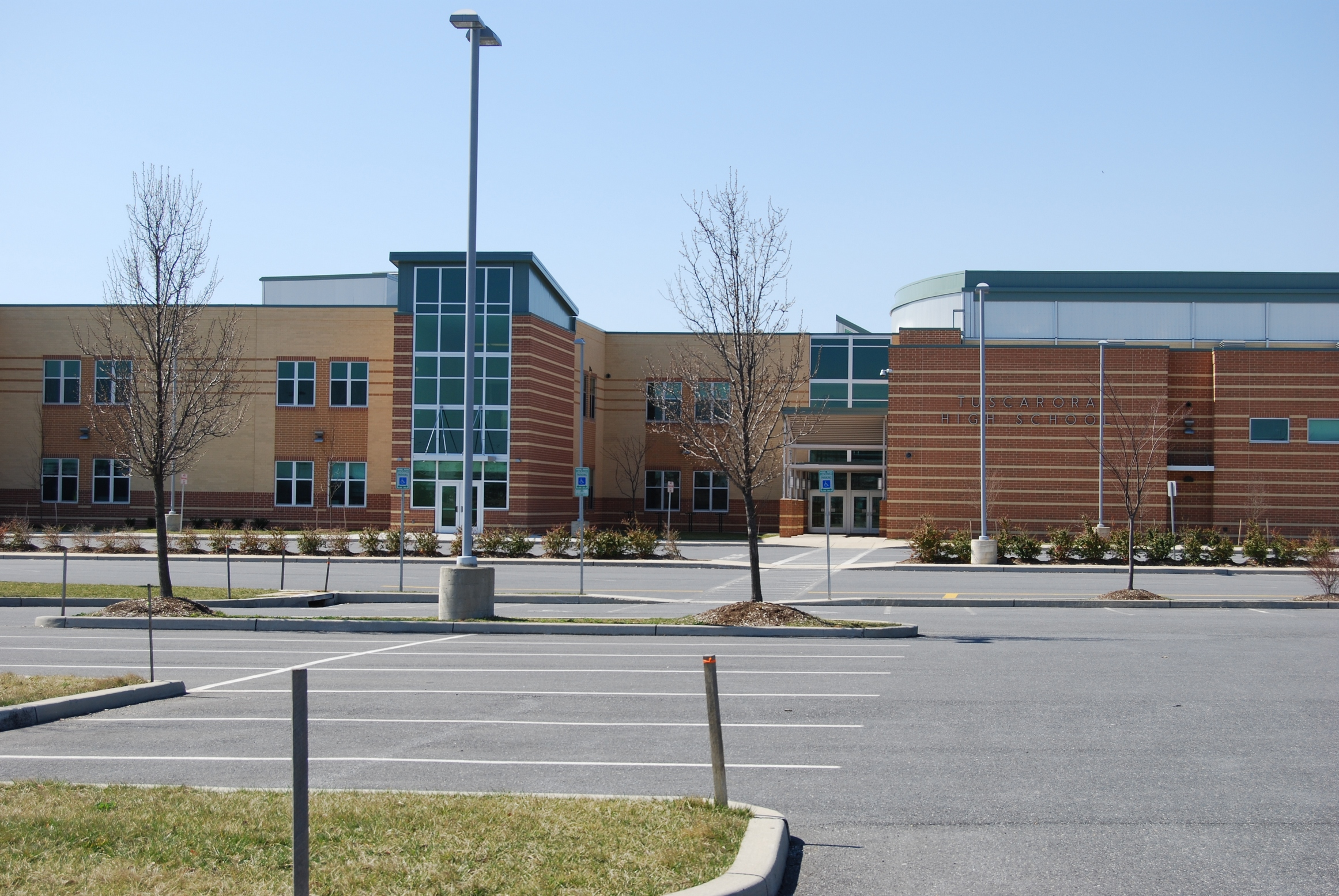

Location
- 5312 Ballenger Creek Pike; Frederick, Maryland 21703; United States; 39°22′41″N 77°26′45″W

Information
- Type: Public high school
- Motto: "Achieve Excellence through Commitment and Service"
- Opened: 2003
- School district: Frederick County Public Schools
- Principal: Lisa Smith
- Faculty: 87.00 (FTE)
- Grades: 9–12
- Enrollment: 1,735 (2024-25)
- Student to teacher ratio: 17.82
- Campus: Suburban
- Colours: Green, silver and black
- Mascot: Tyrone The Titan
- Nickname: Tuscarora Titans
- Team name: Titans
- Rival: Frederick Cadets
- Newspaper: Titan Times
- Feeder schools: Ballenger Creek Middle & Crestwood Middle School
- Website: education.fcps.org/ths/

Tuscarora High School is a secondary school located at 5312 Ballenger Creek Pike just south of the corporate boundaries of Frederick, Maryland, United States.

== History ==
Tuscarora High School opened in 2003. As of the 2026–2027 school year, the enrollment was 1,748 students.

== Teams and activities ==
Tuscarora has many extracurricular sports teams and clubs.

Fall	Winter	Spring
Cross Country	Boys Basketball	Baseball
Field Hockey	Girls Basketball	Boys Lacrosse
Football (9th / JV)	Swimming/Diving	Girls Lacrosse
Football (Varsity)	Indoor Track	Softball
Golf	Wrestling	Tennis
Boys Soccer	Cheerleading	Track
Girls Soccer	Ice Hockey	
Volleyball	Concert Choir	

== Demographics ==
=== Ethnicity ===
White: 601

Black: 540

American Indian/Alaskan Native: *fewer than 10*

Asian: 112

Hawaiian/Pacific Islander: *fewer than 10*

Hispanic: 338

=== Capacity ===
School Capacity: 1,606 (Does not include portable classrooms)

Total Enrollment: 1,491

== Notable alumni ==
- Jordan Addison (class of 2020), Professional Football Player for the Minnesota Vikings
- Obadiah Noel (class of 2017), Guard for the Westchester Knicks
