= Frederick County Sheriff's Office =

- Common name: Frederick County Sheriff's Office
- Abbreviation: FCSO

Agency overview
- Formed: 1748

Jurisdictional structure
- Operations jurisdiction: Frederick County, Maryland, Maryland, U.S.
- Map of Frederick County Sheriff's Office's jurisdiction
- Area: 662.88 square miles (1,716.9 km^{2})
- Population: 222,938
- General nature: Civilian police

Operational structure
- Headquarters: Frederick, Maryland
- Agency executive: Chuck Jenkins, Sheriff

Facilities
- Headquarters: 110 Airport Drive East, Frederick, MD 21701

Website
- https://www.frederickcosheriff.com

The Frederick County Sheriff's Office (FCSO) is the primary law enforcement agency serving a population of 222,938 residents within the 662.88 square miles (1,717 km^{2}) area of Frederick County, Maryland.

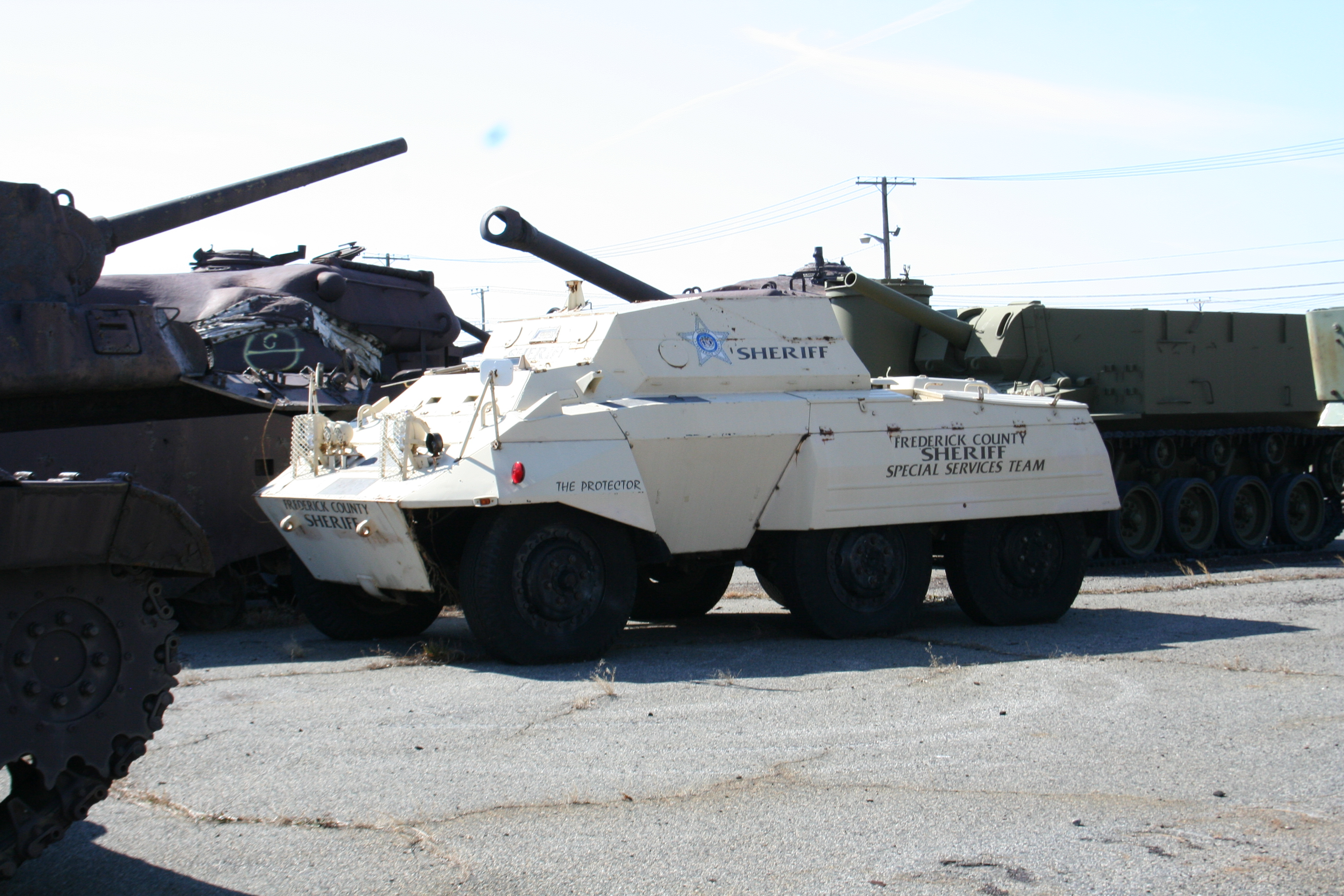
Frederick County M20 now sitting at the Aberdeen Ordnance Museum storage lot, March 2008

== Overview ==
The Frederick County Sheriff's Office (FCSO) is organized into two different bureaus, the Law Enforcement Bureau and the Corrections Bureau, which consists of divisions, sections, and services.

== History ==
In December 2013, Deputy First Class Todd Joia was charged with entry without breaking in nearby Berkeley County, West Virginia. The case is related to the theft of more than two thousand dollars from a pair of gambling machines. The deputy was suspended when his arrest was made known to his department. In February 2014, he resigned from the office, was sentenced to a year on probation and restitution. During the same week, Deputy First Class Kevin Darnell White was suspended when he was arrested for an off-duty drunken assault in nearby Hagerstown, Maryland. He was also suspended and later acquitted of all charges.

On 12 January 2013, three Frederick County Sheriff's Office (FCSO) Deputies were out of uniform while working after hours as security guards. They were called to a movie theater where a man with Down syndrome refused to leave the cinema after the movie was over. The three, Lieutenant Scott Jewell, Sergeant Rich Rochford, and Deputy First Class James Harris, confronted Ethan Saylor and his caregiver. In the confrontation the three men fell on the 26-year-old Saylor and handcuffed him. He then died of asphyxiation. A grand jury did not return any charges in the case. As of July 25, 2013 the federal Department of Justice was investigating Saylor's death as a civil rights case.

At one o'clock in the morning on 10 January 2013, deputies dressed in military gear tried to conduct a no-knock arrest warrant on nineteen-year-old Daniel Vail. Vail was wanted in a nearby county for a home invasion. The deputies threw a stun grenade into Vail's bedroom to disorient him. Unnamed deputies said the naked man had a shotgun in his hands. After the deputies ordered him to drop the weapon, they fired eighteen bullets, killing Vail. An internal investigation by the Frederick County Sheriff's Office cleared the deputies of any wrongdoing.

Deputy Sam Bowman was indicted in 2011 on several charges of having sexually abused a 14-year-old girl. He was assigned as a school resource officer at Walkersville High School.

Sergeant Theodore Randolph "Randy" Dorsey was indicted on arson charges in November, 2006 related to destroying his vehicle as part of an insurance scam.

=== Sheriff's of Frederick County, Maryland ===
- Sheriff Chuck Jenkins, 2006–present
- Sheriff James W. Hagy, 1994–2006
- Sheriff Carl R. Harbaugh, 1990–1994
- Sheriff Robert C. Snyder, 1982–1990
- Sheriff Donald C. Barnes, 1974–1982
- Sheriff Richard O. Baumgartner, 1970–1974
- Sheriff Crummell P. Jacobs, 1966–1970
- Sheriff Horace M. Alexander, 1953–1966
- Sheriff R. Paul Buhrman, 1953
- Sheriff Guy Anders, 1946–1952

== Headquarters ==
The Frederick County Sheriff's Office (FCSO) shares its headquarters building with the local Maryland State Police (MSP) unit (Barrack B-Frederick) and the Frederick County Emergency Communications (FCEC) Center.

== Law Enforcement Bureau ==
=== Operations Division ===
The Operations Division consists of three operational sections:

==== Patrol Operations ====
- Patrol Teams
- Honor Guard
- K-9 Program
- Community Deputies
- School Resource Officers (SRO)
- Pro-Active Criminal Enforcement (PACE) Team
- Traffic Unit
- Civil Order and Firearms Surrender Programs

==== Special Operations ====
- Crime Analysis
- Criminal Investigations Section
- Evidence Unit
- Pawn Unit
- Narcotics Investigations Section
- Crisis Negotiation Team
- SWAT

The Special Operations unit comprises the Criminal Investigations, Gaming, Pawn, Special Assignment, Task Force, and Crime Analysis sections. A Juvenile Specialist, Evidence Custodian, and the Special Services Team are also part of Special Operations.

==== Judicial Services ====
A Civil Process unit, Child Support section, Court Security force, and Alarms/Permits unit are part of Judicial Operations.

=== Administrative Services Division ===
The Administrative Services Division consists of three administrative support sections to include :

==== Personnel Services ====
- Background & Recruiting
- Police Information Specialist
- Records Section

Personnel Services includes the Background/Recruiting, Polygraph, and Accreditation sections.

==== Fiscal Services ====
- Agency Property Management
- Billing Coordination
- Budget Development & Management
- Capital Improvement Projects
- Grants
- Planning & Research
- Purchasing
- Quartermaster

Fiscal Services comprises the Budget Development and Management, Planning & Research, Grants, Capital Improvement Projects, Purchasing, Quartermaster, Agency Property Management, and Billing Coordination sections.

==== Support Services ====
- Building Management
- Community Services Section
- Crime Prevention
- Crossing Guards
- Intern Program
- Training

Support Services includes the Police Information Specialist, Records Section, Fleet Management, Building Management, Victim Services, School Resource Section, Community Services Section, Crime Prevention, Youth Services, Crossing Guards, Reserve Deputies, and Volunteer sections.

Training Services includes the In-Service Training, Police Academy Training, Field Training, Intern Program, Citizens Police Academy, and Community Assistance Patrol Academy sections.

== Corrections Bureau ==
=== Administrative Division ===
- Accounting
- Procurement & Budgeting
- Personnel
- Logistics
- Inmate Records
- Accreditation
- Technology
- Background Investigations
- P.R.E.A
- Compliance/Disciplinary Office

=== Security Division ===
- Security Operations
- Transportation Unit
- Emergency Response Team
- Central Booking
- Gang Intelligence
- 287 (g) Program
- IGSA Program

=== Community Services Division ===
- Alternative Sentencing Program
- Work Release Program
- Home Detention Program
- Pretrial Services Unit

=== Inmate Services Division ===
- Classification & Programs
- Food Services
- Medical & Mental Health Services

== Accreditation ==
- Commission on Accreditation for Law Enforcement (CALEA)
- Commission on Accreditation (CAC) American Correctional Association
- National Commission on Correctional Health Care (NCCHC)

== See also ==
- List of law enforcement agencies in Maryland
