= Maryland House of Delegates District 3B =

American legislative district

Maryland's legislative district 3B
- Represents part of Frederick County
- Registration: 41.4% Democratic; 34.0% Republican; 23.5% unaffiliated
- Demographics: 65.2% White; 12.4% Black/African American; 0.5% Native American; 6.7% Asian; 0.0% Hawaiian/Pacific Islander; 5.2% Other race; 10.0% Two or more races; 12.3% Hispanic
- Population (2020): 49,737
- Voting-age population: 37,704
- Registered voters: 34,678

Maryland House of Delegates District 3B was a former district of the Maryland House of Delegates. Along with subdistrict 3A, it made up the 3rd district of the Maryland Senate. District 3B included part of Frederick County and was represented by one delegate. During the 2020 United States redistricting cycle, the district was absorbed into the 3rd district.

== Demographic characteristics ==
As of the 2020 United States census, the district had a population of 49,737, of whom 37,704 (75.8%) were of voting age. The racial makeup of the district was 32,427 (65.2%) White, 6,156 (12.4%) African American, 227 (0.5%) Native American, 3,328 (6.7%) Asian, 21 (0.0%) Pacific Islander, 2,600 (5.2%) from some other race, and 4,964 (10.0%) from two or more races. Hispanic or Latino of any race were 6,097 (12.3%) of the population.

The district had 34,678 registered voters as of October 17, 2020, of whom 8,145 (23.5%) were registered as unaffiliated, 11,791 (34.0%) were registered as Republicans, 14,373 (41.4%) were registered as Democrats, and 128 (0.4%) were registered to other parties.

== Past Election Results ==
=== 1982 ===
Name	Party	Outcome
James E. McClellan	Democratic	Won
M. Albert Morningstar	Democratic	Lost
Julien P. Delphey	Republican	Lost
Donald T. Taylor	Republican	Lost

=== 2002 ===
Name	Party	Votes	Percent	Outcome
Richard B. Weldon Jr.	Republican	8,819	62.4%	Won
Lisa Baugher	Democratic	5,281	37.4%	Lost
Other Write-Ins		37	0.3%	

=== 2006 ===
Name	Party	Votes	Percent	Outcome
Richard B. Weldon Jr.	Republican	10,057	61.4%	Won
Paul Gilligan	Democratic	6,317	38.6%	Lost
Other Write-Ins		9	0.1%	

=== 2010 ===
Name	Party	Votes	Percent	Outcome
Michael Hough	Republican	10,090	57.4%	Won
Paul Gilligan	Democratic	7,444	42.4%	Lost
Other Write-Ins		43	0.2%	

=== 2014 ===
Name	Party	Votes	Percent	Outcome
William Folden	Republican	7,522	56.3%	Won
Stephen Slater	Democratic	5,818	43.6%	Lost
Other Write-Ins		18	0.1%	

=== 2018 ===
Name	Party	Votes	Percent	Outcome
Kenneth P. Kerr	Democratic	10,091	52.4%	Won
William Folden	Republican	9,168	47.6%	Lost
Other Write-Ins		13	0.1%	
