= Jean Roesser =

American politician (1930-2017)

Gloria Jean Wolberg Roesser
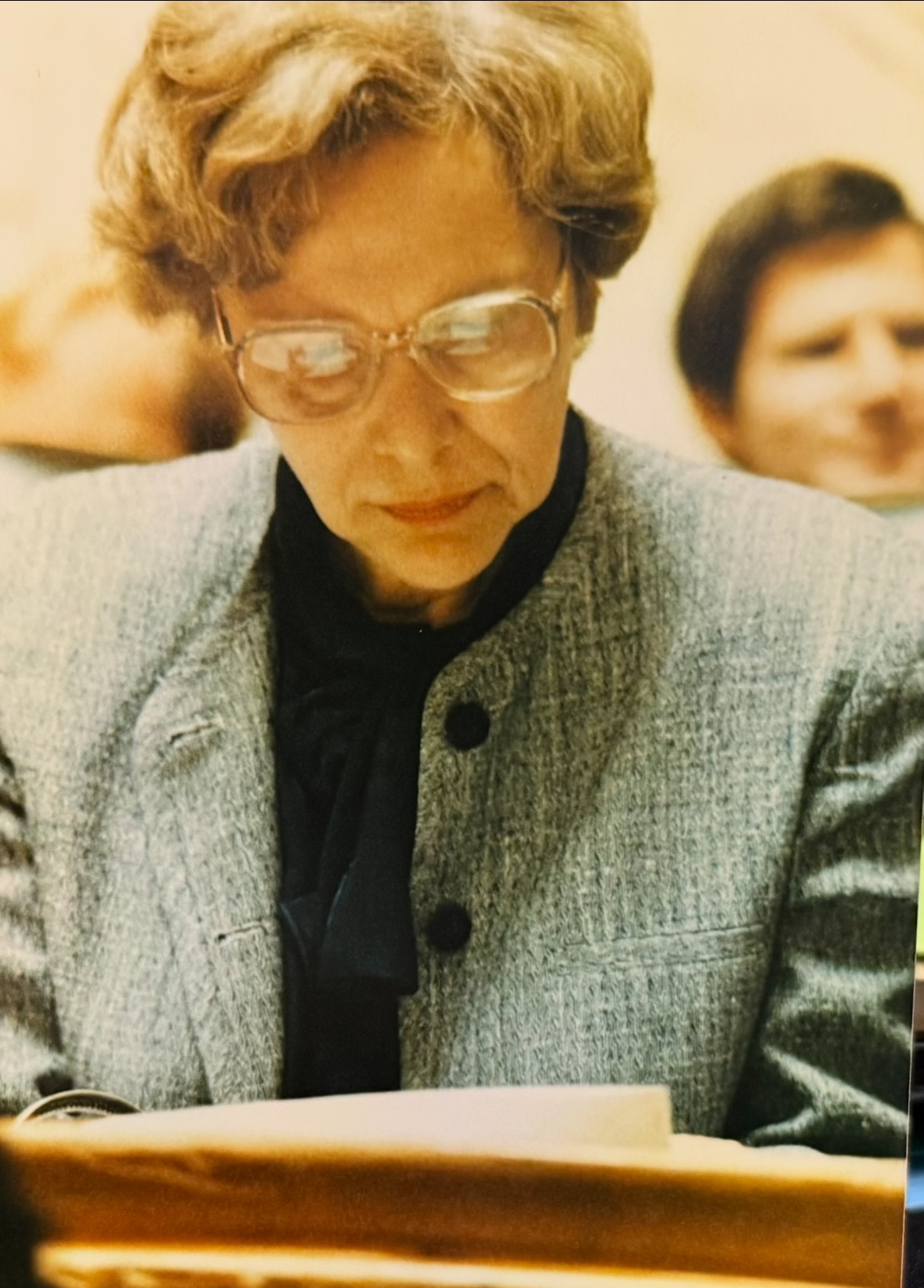

Secretary of Aging of Maryland
- In office January 15, 2003 – January 17, 2007; Acting: January 15, 2003 – February 7, 2003
- Governor: Bob Ehrlich
- Preceded by: Sue Fryer Ward
- Succeeded by: Gloria G. Lawlah

Member of the Maryland Senate from the 15th district
- In office January 11, 1995 – January 8, 2003
- Preceded by: Laurence Levitan
- Succeeded by: Robert J. Garagiola

Member of the Maryland House of Delegates from the 15th district
- In office January 14, 1987 – January 11, 1995 Serving with Judith C. Toth, Gene W. Counihan, Richard A. La Vay
- Preceded by: Jerry H. Hyatt
- Succeeded by: Jean B. Cryor; Mark Kennedy Shriver

Personal details
- Born: May 8, 1930 Washington, D.C., U.S.
- Died: October 2, 2017 (aged 87) Bethesda, Maryland, U.S.
- Education: Trinity College; Catholic University of America
- Occupation: Journalist and politician

Gloria Jean Wolberg Roesser (May 8, 1930 – October 2, 2017) was an American journalist and politician.

Roesser was born in Washington, D.C. She received her bachelor's degree in economics from Trinity College and took graduate courses in economics at the Catholic University of America. Roesser worked as a reporter for the Suburban Record newspaper in Montgomery County, Maryland. She lived in Potomac, Maryland. Roesser was involved with the Republican Party. She served in the Maryland House of Delegates from 1987 to 1995. She then served in the Maryland Senate from 1995 to 2003. From 2004 to 2007, Roesser served as secretary for the Maryland Department of Aging. Roesser died from leukemia in a hospital in Bethesda, Maryland.
