= Aruna Miller =

American politician (born 1964)

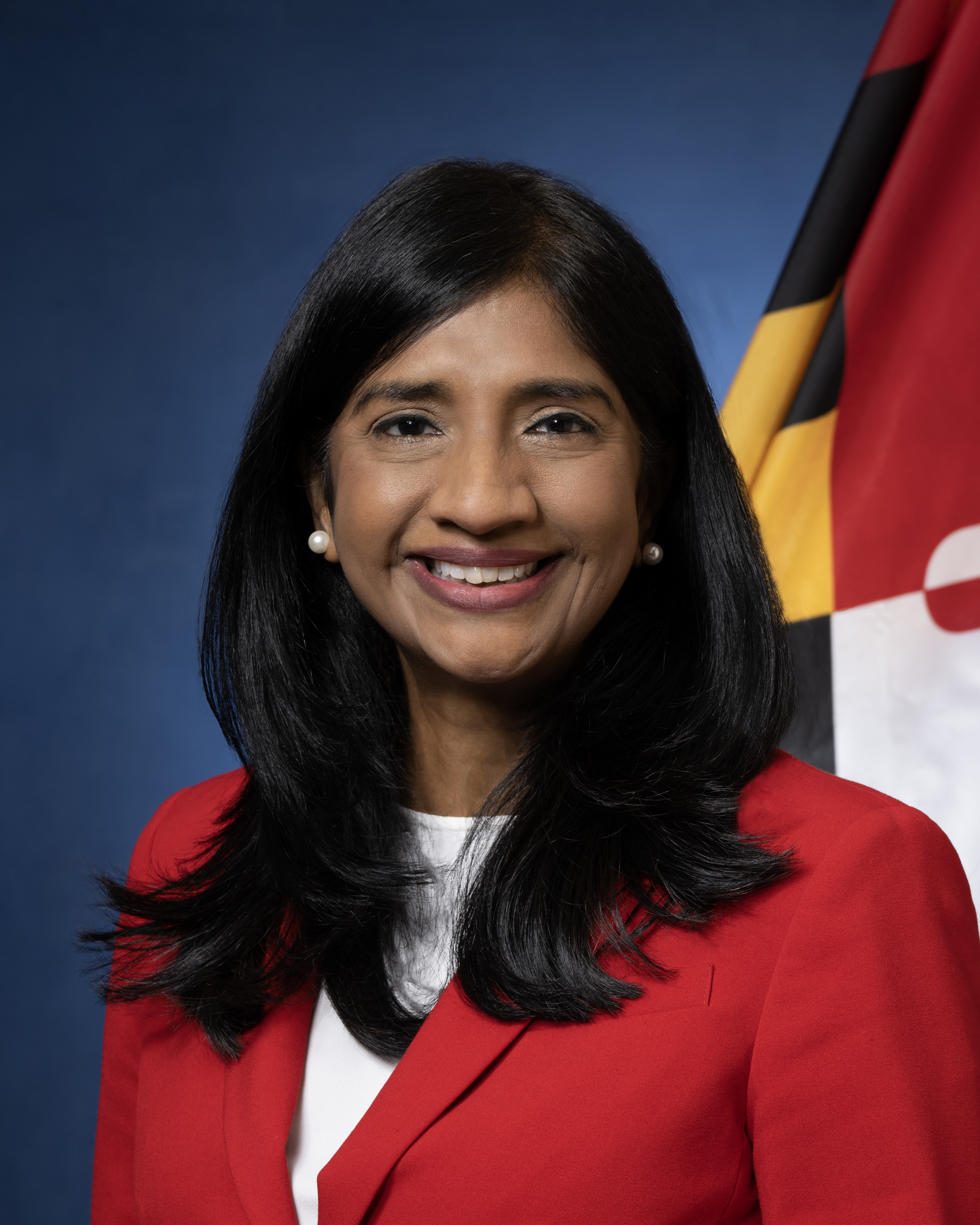
- Official portrait, 2023

10th Lieutenant Governor of Maryland
- Incumbent
- Assumed office January 18, 2023
- Governor: Wes Moore
- Preceded by: Boyd Rutherford

Member of the Maryland House of Delegates from the 15th district
- In office December 1, 2010 – January 9, 2019
- Appointed by: Martin O'Malley
- Preceded by: Craig L. Rice
- Succeeded by: Lily Qi

Personal details
- Born: Aruna Katragadda; November 6, 1964 (age 62) Hyderabad, India
- Citizenship: India (1964–2000); United States (2000–present)
- Party: Democratic
- Spouse: David Miller (m. 1990)
- Children: 3
- Education: Missouri University of Science and Technology (BS)
- Website: Campaign website
- Miller's voice Miller on the Clean Transportation and Energy Act of 2023. Recorded July 14, 2023

Aruna Miller (née Katragadda; born November 6, 1964) is an American politician and civil engineer serving as the tenth lieutenant governor of Maryland since 2023. A member of the Democratic Party, Miller previously represented District 15 in the Maryland House of Delegates from 2010 to 2019. Miller is the first South Asian woman elected lieutenant governor in the United States.

Miller ran for Congress in 2018 to represent Maryland's 6th congressional district, losing to David Trone in the Democratic primary. In December 2021, Wes Moore chose Miller as his running mate in the Democratic primary of the 2022 Maryland gubernatorial election. They won the Democratic nomination on July 19, 2022, and defeated Republican nominee Dan Cox and his running mate Gordana Schifanelli on November 8, 2022.

Miller is the first Asian American lieutenant governor and first immigrant to hold statewide office in Maryland. Miller is the second woman to be elected lieutenant governor of Maryland after Kathleen Kennedy Townsend.

== Early life and education ==
Miller was born on November 6, 1964, in Hyderabad, India, into a Telugu Hindu family. Her family came to the United States when she was seven years old. Along with her two siblings and parents, she lived in Poughkeepsie, New York, where IBM employed her father, Rao Katragadda, as a mechanical engineer. She attended public schools in Upstate New York and Ballwin, Missouri. Miller earned a Bachelor of Science degree in civil engineering from the Missouri University of Science and Technology.

== Career ==
Miller worked as a transportation engineer for local governments in California, Virginia, and Hawaii. She moved to Maryland in 1990, where she worked for the Montgomery County Department of Transportation. She has overseen programs that advanced access to schools, employment centers, and community facilities that are safe for pedestrians, bicyclists, transit users, and people with differing abilities. In 2015, she retired from Montgomery County to devote her full attention to her service in the Maryland legislature.

Miller became a citizen of the United States in 2000 and voted in the 2000 United States presidential election for Vice President of the United States Al Gore. She became frustrated with the Supreme Court's decision in Bush v. Gore, and subsequently became involved with politics by volunteering to help other candidates get elected. During the 2004 United States presidential election, she worked as a precinct-level volunteer for the Democratic Party and presidential nominee John Kerry. In 2006, Miller was appointed to serve as an at-large member of the Montgomery County Democratic Central Committee and served in that position until 2010.

=== Maryland House of Delegates ===
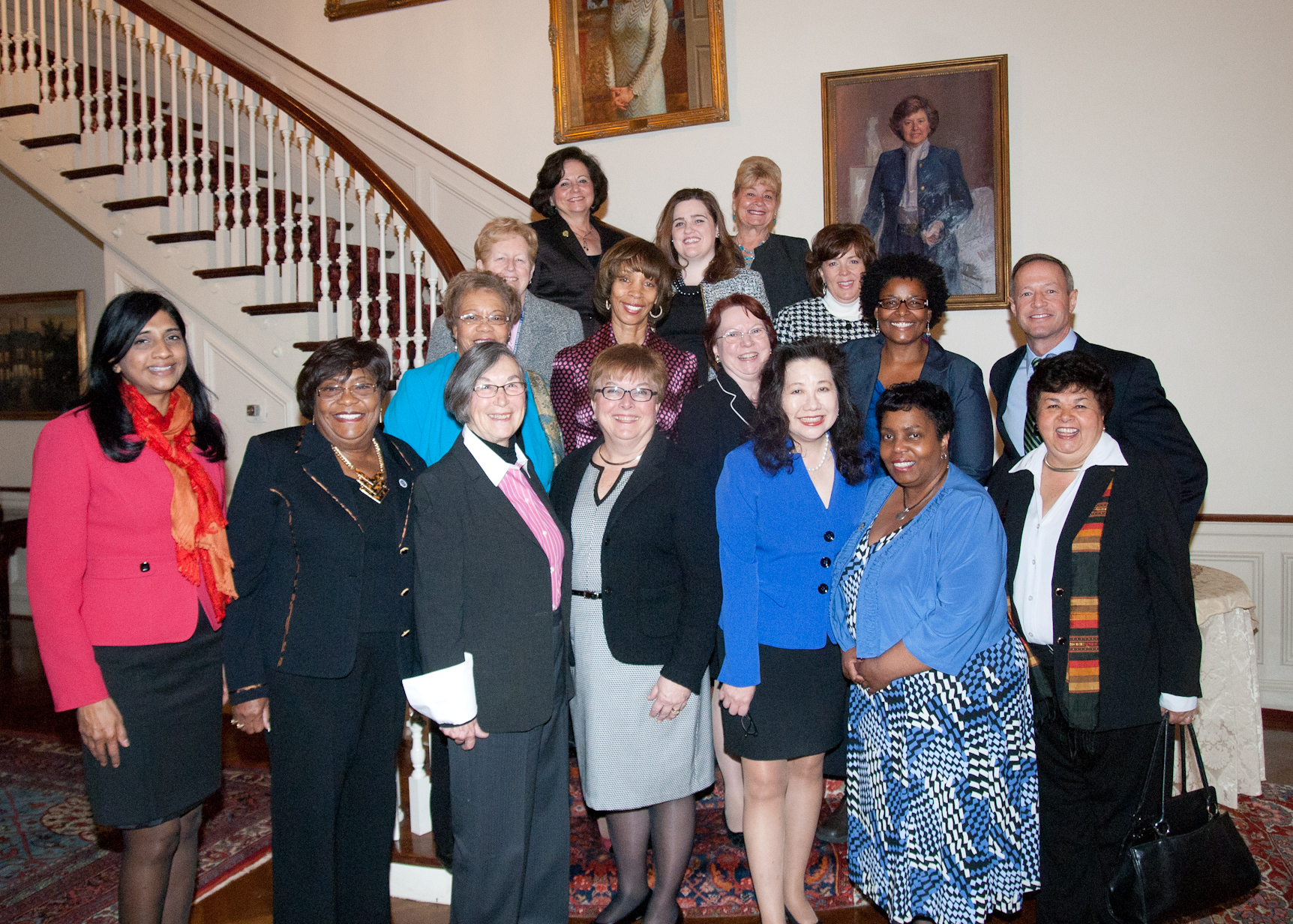
Miller (left) was a member of the Women Legislators of Maryland from 2011 to 2019.

After state delegate Craig L. Rice announced that he would run for the Montgomery County Council in 2010, activists in the Montgomery County Democratic Party called Miller to ask her to run. She initially declined to run, but changed her mind after talking with her husband. Miller won the election to represent District 15 in the Maryland House of Delegates, but assumed office a month early due to Rice's resignation to take office on the Montgomery County Council. Miller received support from fellow members of the Montgomery County Democratic Central Committee, who voted to recommend that Governor Martin O'Malley appoint her to finish the last month of Rice's term. Miller was the first Indian American woman to be elected to the Maryland Legislature.

Miller was a member of the Ways and Means Committee from 2011 to 2015, afterwards serving in the Appropriations Committee until 2019, including as the vice chair of its transportation & the environment subcommittee and the vice chair of the capital budget subcommittee. She was also a member of the Women Legislators of Maryland, serving as its president from 2016 to 2017, and the Maryland Legislative Asian-American and Pacific-Islander Caucus. In 2012, Miller served as an at-large delegate to the Democratic National Convention, pledged to President Barack Obama.

=== 2018 congressional election ===
In May 2017, Miller told The Baltimore Sun that she would run for Congress in Maryland's 6th congressional district if John Delaney decided to pursue a campaign for governor. On July 28, 2017, Miller announced her candidacy in the United States House of Representatives election to replace Delaney, who said he would not run for re-election to instead run for president in 2020. In April 2018, Miller won a straw poll of Democratic activists in Western Maryland. During the election, she was endorsed by the National Education Association, the Sierra Club, EMILY's List, 314 Action, and Sen. Kirsten Gillibrand, Rep. Pramila Jayapal, and then County Executive Ike Leggett, among others.

Despite having received the most individual donations out of her Democratic opponents, Miller was outspent in the primary 13:1 by David Trone, the largest self-funding congressional candidate in U.S. history, and lost the primary to Trone by 9.3%, with 30.7% of the vote compared to Trone's 40.0%, and consequently did not advance to the general election. She won Montgomery County but this was the only voting district she won outright. Had she been elected, Miller would have been the only woman in Maryland's congressional delegation.

=== Post-legislative career ===
In February 2019, Miller was named the new executive director of Indian American Impact.

In January 2021, Miller filed paperwork to run for Congress again had Trone decided against running for a third-term. After Trone launched his re-election bid on May 7, Miller declined to comment on her 2022 plans.

== Lieutenant Governor of Maryland ==
=== Elections ===
==== 2022 ====
In December 2021, Wes Moore selected Miller as his running mate in the Democratic primary of the 2022 Maryland gubernatorial election. The Moore-Miller ticket won the Democratic primary election on July 19, 2022.

The ticket defeated Republican nominees Dan Cox and Gordana Schifanelli in the general election on November 8, 2022. Miller is the first South Asian woman elected lieutenant governor in the United States, and the first Asian American lieutenant governor and first immigrant to hold statewide office in Maryland. Miller served as the chair of the transition team for Governor-elect Moore.

==== 2026 ====
On September 9, 2025, Moore announced that he would run for re-election with Miller as his running mate in 2026.

=== Tenure ===
Miller was sworn in on January 18, 2023. She took the oath of office on the Bhagavad Gita, making her first lieutenant governor to do so.

In February 2023, Miller became the first woman of color to chair the Maryland Board of Public Works meeting after Governor Moore recused himself from a vote related to a contract between the Maryland Department of Health and Under Armour, a company he has financial holdings in. In October 2024, Miller and Comptroller Brooke Lierman presided over the Board of Public Works, marking the first time in Maryland history in which only women presided over the meeting.

Miller was an at-large delegate to the 2024 Democratic National Convention, pledged to Kamala Harris and served as a member of the DNC Rules committee. Miller traveled out of state to battleground state of Michigan in support of the Kamala Harris 2024 presidential campaign In the 2024 presidential election, Miller voted as an elector pledged to Harris.

=== Highway work zone safety ===
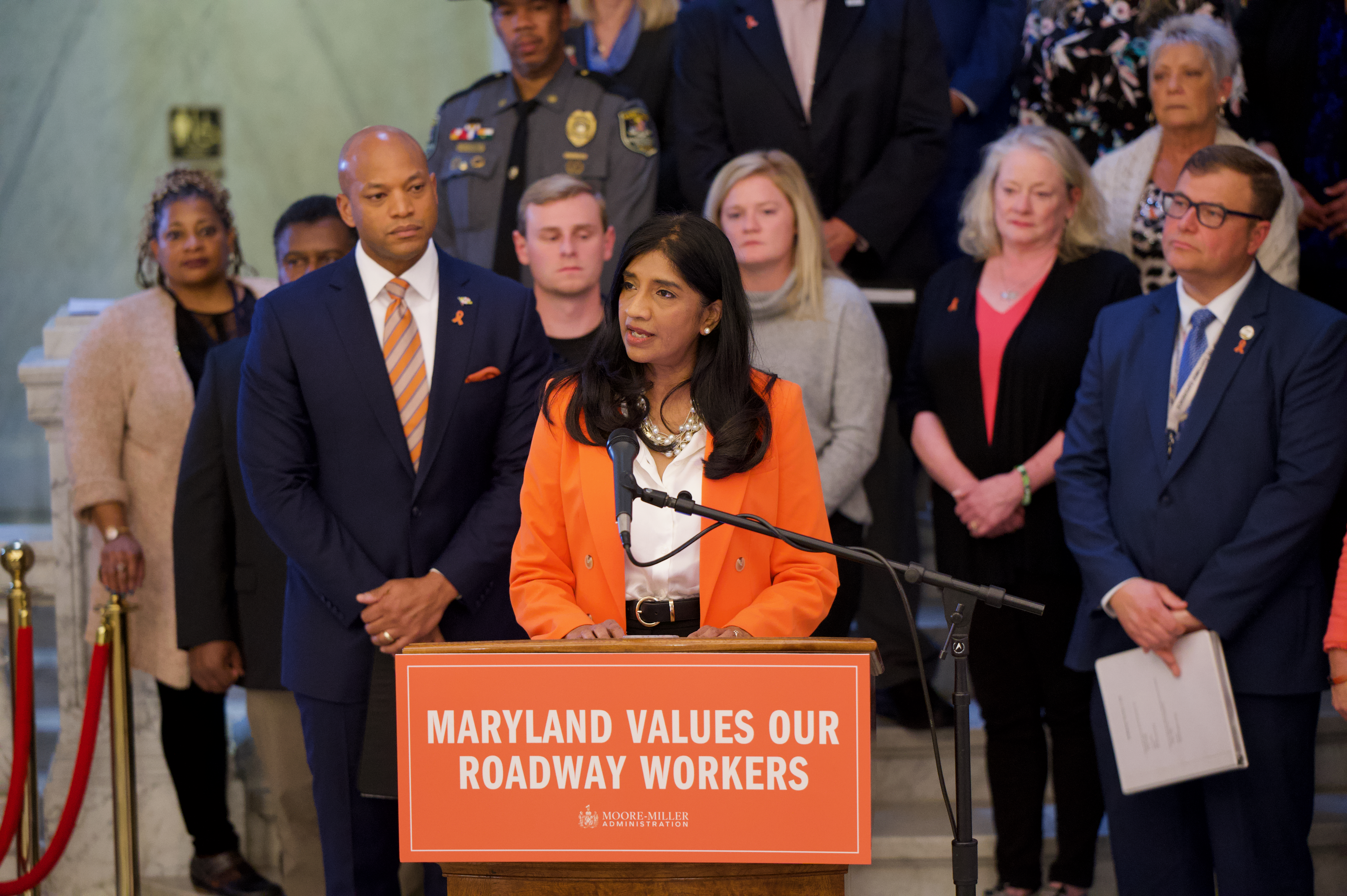
Miller announces road worker safety measures, 2023

During her tenure, Miller has worked on issues involving transportation issues, including mass transit projects like the Red Line and Purple Line, and in promoting STEM education. In April 2023, following a car crash that resulted in the deaths of six highway workers, Governor Moore appointed Miller to chair the Work Zone Safety Work Group. This group was tasked with developing policy recommendations to prevent future work zone accidents. Under Miller's leadership, the Work Zone Safety Work Group proposed several key measures, including modifications to existing state laws to authorize the use of unmanned cameras in work zones and increased penalties for speeding in these areas. These recommendations were incorporated into the Maryland Road Worker Protection Act of 2024, which Miller testified for in both houses of the Maryland General Assembly. The bill was subsequently passed and signed into law by Governor Moore. In early 2025, following implementation of the new work zone speed enforcement law, Maryland issued over 48,000 speeding citations in work zones within the first two months. During National Work Zone Awareness Week, Miller emphasized the law’s purpose, calling reckless driving “a dangerous weapon.” Following the resignation of Maryland Transportation Secretary Paul Wiedefeld in July 2025, Miller was tasked with leading a nationwide search for his replacement.

=== Substance abuse prevention ===
As lieutenant governor, Miller chairs the Maryland Overdose Response Advisory Council, which is involved with efforts to reduce overdose deaths and expand access to treatment. In this position, she has overseen the launch of a statewide overdose data dashboard to provide real-time data and guide policy interventions. In 2025, Maryland recorded its fourth consecutive year of declining overdose deaths in the state, which had also fallen to a ten-year low.

=== Alleged ties to Hindutva ===
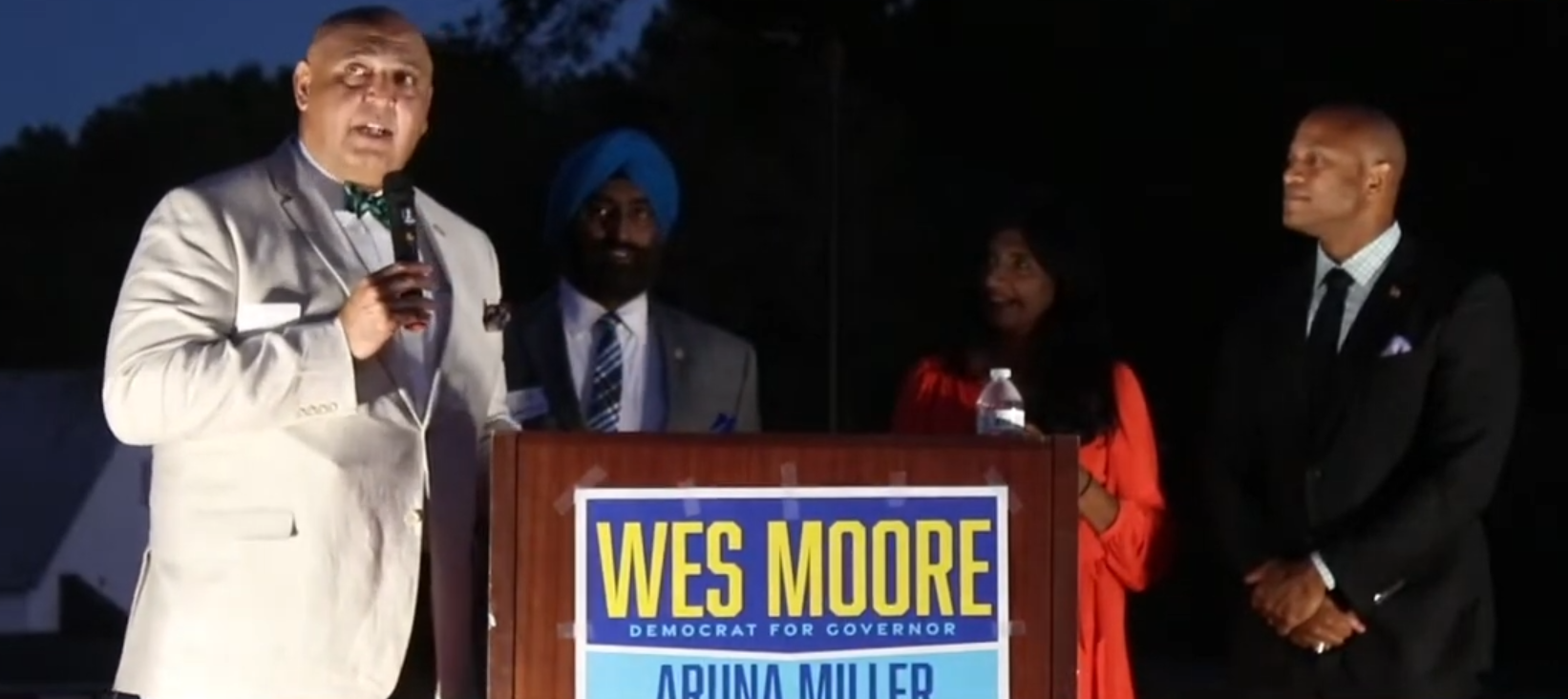
Jesse Singh and Sajid Tarar (left) campaign for Moore and Miller (right)

In October 2022, The Intercept reported that Moore and Miller were honored at a fundraiser hosted by individuals associated with Hindutva, or a Hindu nationalist political ideology. The fundraiser occurred after the Moore campaign added a page to its website highlighting Miller's record on supporting Muslim communities and religious freedom, accompanied by the statement, "There is not one dollar in this campaign that has anything to do with the Hindutva movement or international politics." In August 2023, Salon reported that Miller had accepted at least $110,000 in contributions from individuals connected to the Hindutva movement since 2011, but noted the same donors implicated in criticisms of Miller routinely contributed to other Democrats across Maryland, though officials and candidates who are not of Indian descent rarely received criticism for accepting these contributions. In a November 2022 interview with Bethesda Magazine, Miller denied participating in fundraisers with Hindu nationalists, and said that she felt an unfair spotlight had been focused on her because she is Indian-American and grew up in a Hindu-Christian household.

In June 2023, during Indian Prime Minister Narendra Modi's state visit to the United States, Miller tweeted a statement in support of efforts urging President Joe Biden to press Modi on the issue of human rights. At the invitation of President Biden, she attended a White House dinner hosted in Modi's honor.

In July 2023, The Independent reported that party officials acting on behalf of Miller had retaliated against people who alleged she had ties to Hindutva, including an instance where a Democratic central committee member claimed that he was threatened by the chair to alter his vote supporting Susan Kerin, an activist who alleged Miller had ties to Hindutva. Another activist claimed that in 2018, he lost his job for criticizing Miller, and another claimed they lost their party position. Miller, in statements to The Independent, denied these allegations and presented evidence disproving one of the claims. The chair of the Montgomery County Democratic Central Committee, Saman Qadeer Ahmad, denied she threatened the committee member on his vote.

== Political positions ==
=== Education ===
In 2013, Miller co-sponsored legislation that would require schools to start after Labor Day. In August 2016, Governor Larry Hogan released a statement that included a number of county legislators, including Miller, that supported his decision to move the state's school start date to after Labor Day.

During the 2014 legislative session, Miller introduced legislation that would create a state study to review school start times and how sleep affected academic performance and school activities. The bill passed and was signed into law by Governor O'Malley on April 4. In 2016, Miller introduced legislation that would recognize school systems as "Orange Ribbon Schools" if they had elementary school classes starting after 8am and middle school classes after 8:30am. The bill passed and was signed into law by Governor Hogan.

In 2018, Miller introduced legislation that would require high schools to offer at least one high-quality computer science course and encourages local school districts to integrate computer science into their earlier grades.

=== Economy ===
In 2013, Miller was one of ten Maryland lawmakers named to the Maryland Business Climate Work Group designed to make recommendations and develop long-term plans to streamline business regulations, encourage business innovation, and develop public-private partnerships to finance infrastructure.

Miller encouraged strengthening economic and cultural development between Maryland and India and accompanied Governor Martin O'Malley on a trade mission to India in 2011, which resulted in nearly $60 million in business deals for the state of Maryland. Delegate Miller took a lead role in working with the Office of the Secretary of State and the Department of Economic Development to coordinate the Governor's arrangements for his first stop to Hyderabad.

During her first term as a state delegate, Miller introduced one of the early Maryland bills for paid family leave.

In her second term, while serving as chair of the Oversight of Personnel Subcommittee, Miller was the floor leader for multiple bills expanding collective bargaining for employees.

Miller stood in opposition to excluding nail salon workers from being eligible to receive unemployment benefits

In February 2018, Miller voted for a bill that would provide $5.6 billion in tax incentives to Amazon to build their second headquarters in Montgomery County.

=== Environment ===
One of Miller's first actions after being elected to the Maryland General Assembly was to co-sponsor the Marcellus Shale Act of 2011, which laid the groundwork for the eventual passage of Maryland's fracking ban, which she co-sponsored.

In 2013, Governor Martin O'Malley appointed Miller as a commissioner to the Interstate Commission on the Potomac River Basin (ICPRB). The mission is to enhance, protect, and conserve the water and associated land resources of the Potomac River and its tributaries through regional and interstate cooperation. She served on the ICPRB until 2019.

=== Healthcare ===
In January 2012, Miller signed onto an amicus brief in the Supreme Court case of National Federation of Independent Business v. Sebelius supporting the Affordable Care Act. During her 2018 House of Representatives campaign, Miller said she supported moving toward a single-payer healthcare system.

=== Gun control ===
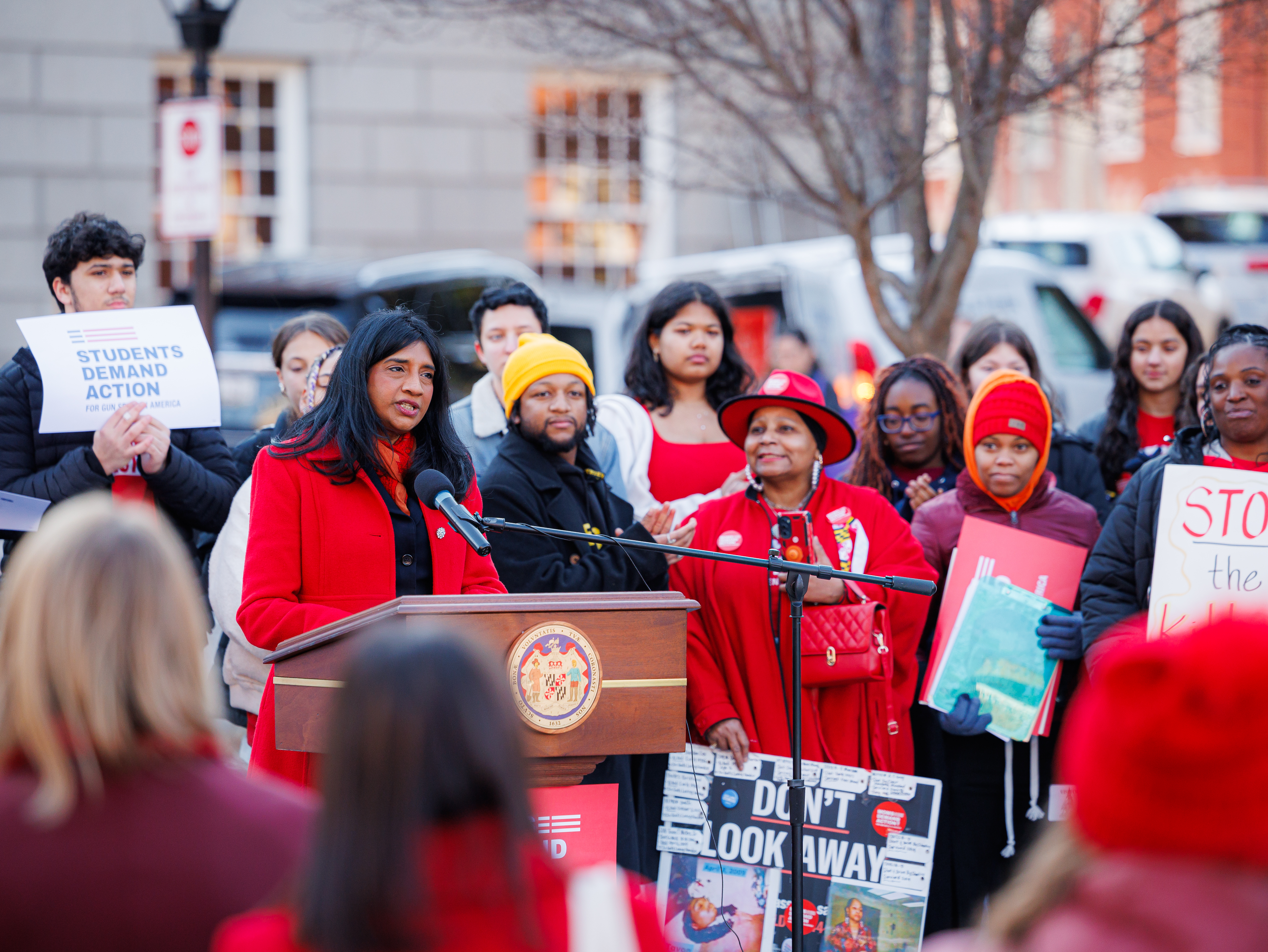
Miller speaks at a Moms Demand Action rally in Annapolis, 2025

In March 2018, Miller said that the gun control provisions included in Congress's $1.3 trillion spending bill "did not go far enough." That week, she unveiled a gun control plan that included expanded research, universal background checks, an assault weapons ban, and increasing the minimum age to buy a firearm.

=== Social issues ===
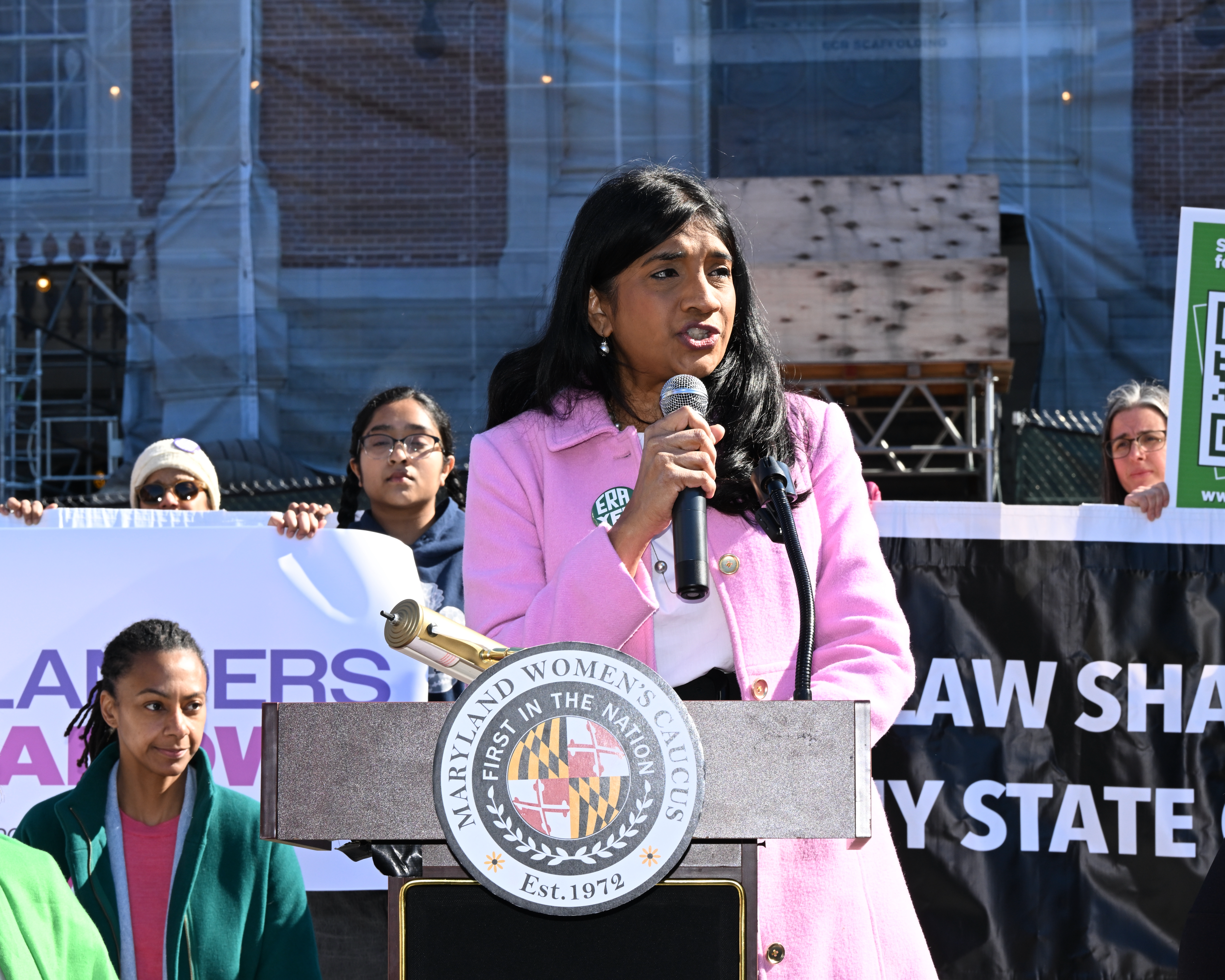
Miller speaks at an Equal Rights Amendment rally, 2024

During the 2012 legislative session, Miller voted for the Civil Marriage Protection Act, a bill to legalize same-sex marriage in Maryland.

In August 2015, Miller called for the resignation of Maryland Housing Secretary Kenneth Holt after he claimed without evidence that parents were deliberately exposing their children to lead paint to get free housing.

=== National politics ===
Miller endorsed former Secretary of State Hillary Clinton for president on April 9, 2016. On April 17, 2019, Miller and the Indian American Impact group endorsed U.S. Senator from California Kamala Harris for president.

=== Opioid crisis ===
In March 2018, Miller said she supported studying alternative treatments, including ibogaine and marijuana, to help patients wean themselves from opioids.

== Personal life ==
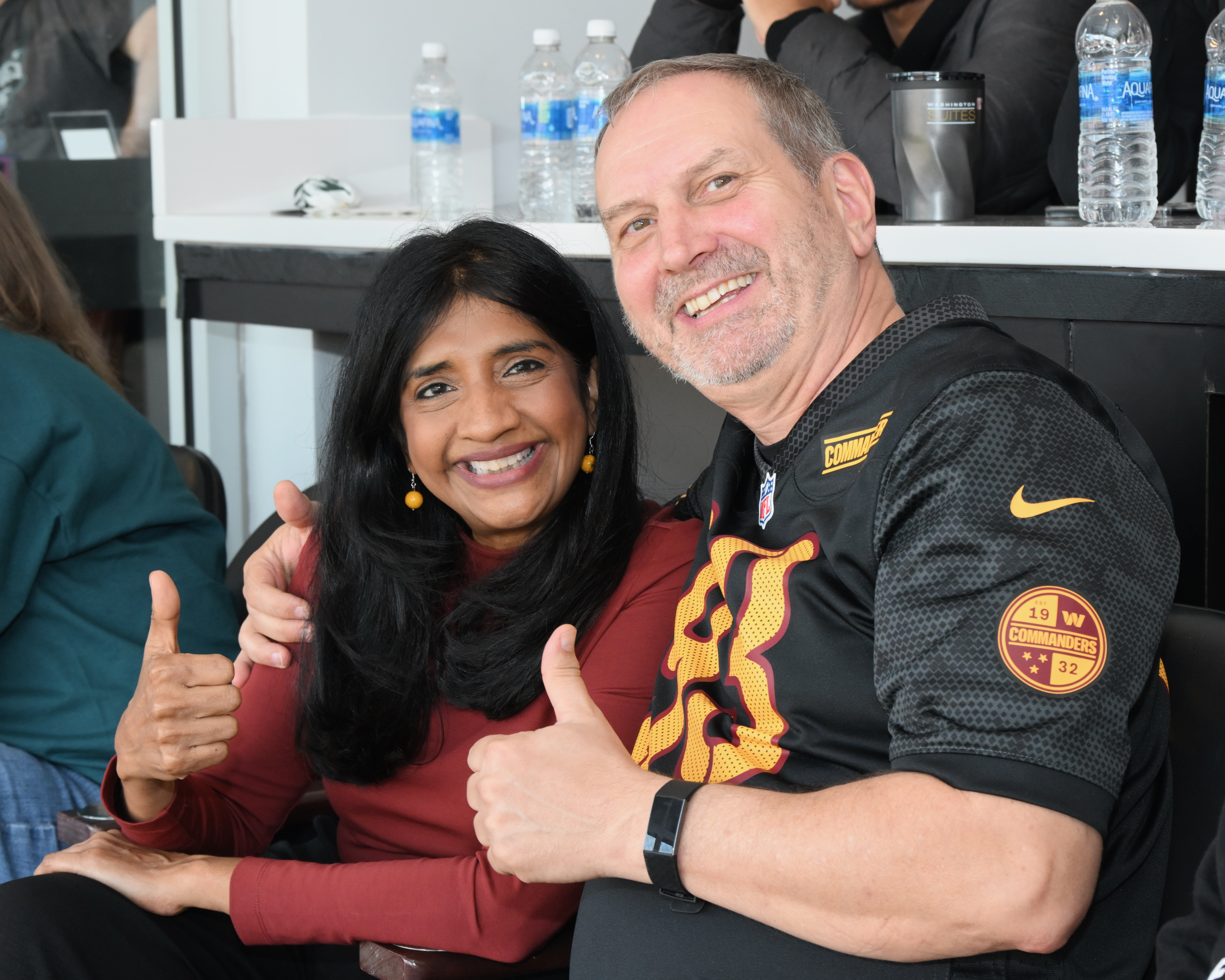
Miller and her husband David at a Washington Commanders game in October 2023

Miller is an adherent of Hinduism and swore her oath on the Bhagavad Gita. In 1990, she moved to Montgomery County, Maryland, where she married her college sweetheart, David Miller. Miller has three adult daughters, and her mother lives with the family in Darnestown, Maryland. She and her husband are vegetarians.

Miller maintains her activism in community organizations and has served on the boards of Round House Theatre, Montgomery Parks Foundation, Emerge Maryland, Madison House Autism Foundation, BlackRock Center for the Arts and the Montgomery County Public Schools Educational Foundation.

Miller is a graduate of Leadership Montgomery.

== Electoral history ==
Maryland House of Delegates District 15 Democratic Primary Election, 2010
Party	Candidate	Votes	%
Democratic	Brian J. Feldman	6,262	31.4
Democratic	Kathleen Dumais	6,086	30.6
Democratic	Aruna Miller	4,671	23.5
Democratic	David Fraser-Hidalgo	1,755	8.8
Democratic	Lara Wibeto	1,142	5.7

Maryland House of Delegates District 15 Election, 2010
Party	Candidate	Votes	%
Democratic	Kathleen Dumais	23,476	20.7
Democratic	Brian J. Feldman	23,120	20.4
Democratic	Aruna Miller	21,353	18.9
Republican	Scott Graham	15,298	13.5
Republican	Sylvia J. Darrow	14,490	12.8
Republican	Matthew Mockerman	13,477	11.9
Libertarian	Arvin Vohra	1,910	1.7
Write-in		54	0.0

Maryland House of Delegates District 15 Election, 2014
Party	Candidate	Votes	%
Democratic	Kathleen Dumais	19,083	20.6
Democratic	Aruna Miller	18,071	19.5
Democratic	David Fraser-Hidalgo	17,324	18.7
Republican	Ed Edmundson	12,913	13.9
Republican	Christine Thron	12,825	13.8
Republican	Flynn Ficker	12,355	13.3
Write-in		86	0.1

Maryland's 6th congressional district Democratic primary election, 2018
Party	Candidate	Votes	%
Democratic	David Trone	24,103	40.0
Democratic	Aruna Miller	18,524	30.7
Democratic	Nadia Hashimi	6,304	10.5
Democratic	Roger Manno	6,257	10.4
Democratic	Andrew Duck	2,949	4.9
Democratic	Chris Graves	982	1.6
Democratic	George English	650	1.1
Democratic	Christopher Hearsey	531	0.9

Maryland gubernatorial Democratic primary, 2022
Party	Candidate	Votes	%
Democratic	Wes Moore; Aruna Miller	217,524	32.4
Democratic	Tom Perez; Shannon Sneed	202,175	30.1
Democratic	Peter Franchot; Monique Anderson-Walker	141,586	21.1
Democratic	Rushern Baker (withdrawn); Nancy Navarro (withdrawn)	26,594	4.0
Democratic	Doug Gansler; Candace Hollingsworth	25,481	3.8
Democratic	John King Jr.; Michelle Siri	24,882	3.7
Democratic	Ashwani Jain; LaTrece Hawkins Lytes	13,784	2.1
Democratic	Jon Baron; Natalie Williams	11,880	1.8
Democratic	Jerome Segal; Justinian M. Dispenza	4,276	0.6
Democratic	Ralph Jaffe; Mark Greben	2,978	0.4

Maryland gubernatorial election, 2022
Party	Candidate	Votes	%	±%
Democratic	Wes Moore; Aruna Miller	1,293,944	64.53	+21.02
Republican	Dan Cox; Gordana Schifanelli	644,000	32.12	−24.23
Libertarian	David Lashar; Christiana Logansmith	30,101	1.50	+0.93
Working Class	David Harding; Cathy White	17,154	0.86	N/A
Green	Nancy Wallace; Patrick Elder	14,580	0.73	+0.25
Write-in		5,444	0.27	+0.19
Total votes		2,005,259	100.0	
Democratic gain from Republican				

== See also ==
- List of female lieutenant governors in the United States
- List of minority governors and lieutenant governors in the United States

Party political offices
Preceded by Susan Turnbull	Democratic nominee for Lieutenant Governor of Maryland; 2022	Most recent
Political offices
Preceded by Boyd Rutherford	Lieutenant Governor of Maryland; 2023–present	Incumbent
