= Jean B. Cryor =

American politician (1938-2009)

Member of the Maryland House of Delegates from the 15th district
- In office January 11, 1995 – January 10, 2007
- Preceded by: Gene W. Counihan, Judith C. Toth, & Jean W. Roesser
- Succeeded by: Craig L. Rice
- Constituency: Montgomery County, Maryland

Personal details
- Born: December 13, 1938 Delaware County, Pennsylvania
- Died: November 3, 2009 (aged 70)
- Party: Republican

Jean B. Cryor (December 13, 1938 – November 3, 2009) was a member of the Maryland House of Delegates for District 15, which covers a portion of Montgomery County, Maryland, and later sat on the Montgomery County Planning Board.

== Background ==
Cryor was born (December 13, 1938) in Lansdowne, Pennsylvania and raised in the suburbs of Philadelphia. She lived in Montgomery County, Maryland for over 35 years, and died on November 3, 2009, of cancer.

=== Education ===
Cryor attended Convent of the Sacred Heart in Overbrook, Pennsylvania, now located in Bryn Mawr, Pennsylvania. She attended the University of Pennsylvania. In 1979, she graduated from Loyola College in Maryland with her M.B.A.

=== Family ===
She married Daniel J. Cryor (1933–1978) November 21, 1959. The Cryors moved to the Washington, D.C. area in 1972 for Mr. Cryor's job as a television reporter, and he later became a legislative aide for Rep. Edwin B. Forsythe. After her husband's sudden death at the age of 45, Cryor raised her three daughters, Allison, Jennifer and Deirdre, as a widow in Potomac, Maryland.

== Career ==
Cryor spent much of her career in journalism. She was a reporter for the Philadelphia Bulletin, and for 10 years, she was the mid-Atlantic head for the election reporting pool of the networks and wire services. She was an editor and publisher at The Gazette, launching the Potomac, Bethesda, Chevy Chase and Poolesville Gazettes.

Cryor was first elected to the Maryland House of Delegates in 1994, winning re-election twice, serving on the Ways and Means Committee during her 12-year tenure in Annapolis. In 2005, she was the only Republican to support the creation of a Pay Equity Commission, voting to override the veto of Governor Bob Ehrlich. In 2006, she lost her bid for a fourth term by just 152 votes to Democrat Craig L. Rice – Cryor was the only incumbent Republican Delegate from Montgomery County. The Montgomery County Council appointed her to the County Planning Board in June 2007.

Cryor was selected as a delegate for the 2000 Republican National Convention. She was the only Republican to have been elected president of the Women Legislators of Maryland. She served on numerous boards, including the Maryland Commission for Women, the Universities of Maryland/Shady Grove, BlackRock Center for the Arts, the Potomac Theater Company and Montgomery Women.

== Awards ==
Cryor won several awards over her career, including first prize for Investigative Reporting by the Maryland Society of Professional Journalists in 1993. She was honored as Citizen of the Year (1993) by the Almanac Newspapers; Legislator of the Year (2000) by the Maryland Retailers Association; Businessperson of the Year (2002) by the Maryland Businesses for Responsive Government; Building the Bridge to Excellence in Maryland Public Schools (2002) by the State Board of Education; Legislator of the Year (2002) by the Childhood Brain Tumor Foundation and Registry of Maryland; Maryland's Top 100 Women by the Daily Record (2003 and 2006); the Woman of Achievement Award (2005) by the Suburban Maryland Business and Professional Women Association; and the Lifetime Service Award (2006) from the Potomac Chamber of Commerce.

In July 2010, Glen Hills Park near her Potomac home was dedicated in her honor. In 2013, she was inducted into the Maryland Women's Hall of Fame and was awarded the House of Delegates' Thomas Kennedy Award.

== Election results ==
- 2006 Race for Maryland House of Delegates – District 15

Voters to choose three:

Name	Votes	Percent	Outcome
Kathleen M. Dumais, Dem.	25,781	21.6%	Won
Brian J. Feldman, Dem.	25,760	21.6%	Won
Craig L. Rice, Dem.	20,202	17.0%	Won
Jean B. Cryor, Rep.	20,050	16.8%	Lost
Brian Mezger, Rep.	14,112	11.8%	Lost
Chris Pilkerton, Rep.	13,174	11.1%	Lost

- 2002 Race for Maryland House of Delegates – District 15

Voters to choose three:

Name	Votes	Percent	Outcome
Jean B. Cryor, Rep.	20,584	18.7%	Won
Brian J. Feldman, Dem.	19,719	17.9%	Won
Kathleen M. Dumais, Dem.	19,246	17.5%	Won
John Young, Dem.	17,358	15.8%	Lost
William Ferner Askinazi, Rep.	16,693	15.2%	Lost
Mary Kane, Rep.	16,579	15.0%	Lost
Other Write-Ins	42	0.0%	Lost

- 1998 Race for Maryland House of Delegates – District 15

Voters to choose three:

Name	Votes	Percent	Outcome
Mark K. Shriver, Dem.	26,114	22%	Won
Jean B. Cryor, Rep.	22,160	19%	Won
Richard A. La Vay, Rep.	18,395	16%	Won
David B. Dashefsky, Dem.	17,818	15%	Lost
William Ferner Askinazi, Rep.	16,882	14%	Lost
Anthony Patrick Puca, Dem.	16,841	14%	Lost

- 1994 Race for Maryland House of Delegates – District 15

Voters to choose three:

Name	Votes	Percent	Outcome
Mark K. Shriver, Dem.	20,696	20%	Won
Jean Cryor, Rep.	18,804	18%	Won
Richard La Vay, Rep.	17,214	17%	Won
Stuart D. Schooler, Dem.	15,882	15%	Lost
Elizabeth Tookie Gentilcore, Dem.	15,325	15%	Lost
Davis M. Richardson, Rep.	15,847	15%	Lost
