= Garagiola =

Garagiola is a surname. Notable people with the surname include:

- Joe Garagiola (1926–2016), American baseball player, announcer, and television host
- Joe Garagiola Jr. (born 1950), American baseball executive
- Robert J. Garagiola (born 1972), American lawyer and politician
