= Rozdilsky =

Rozdilsky is a surname. Notable people with the surname include:

- Andy the Clown (real name Andrew Rozdilsky; 1917–1995), American clown
- TJR (DJ) (real name Thomas Rozdilsky; born 1983), American DJ and music producer
