= Ronnie Woo Woo =

American baseball fan (born 1941)

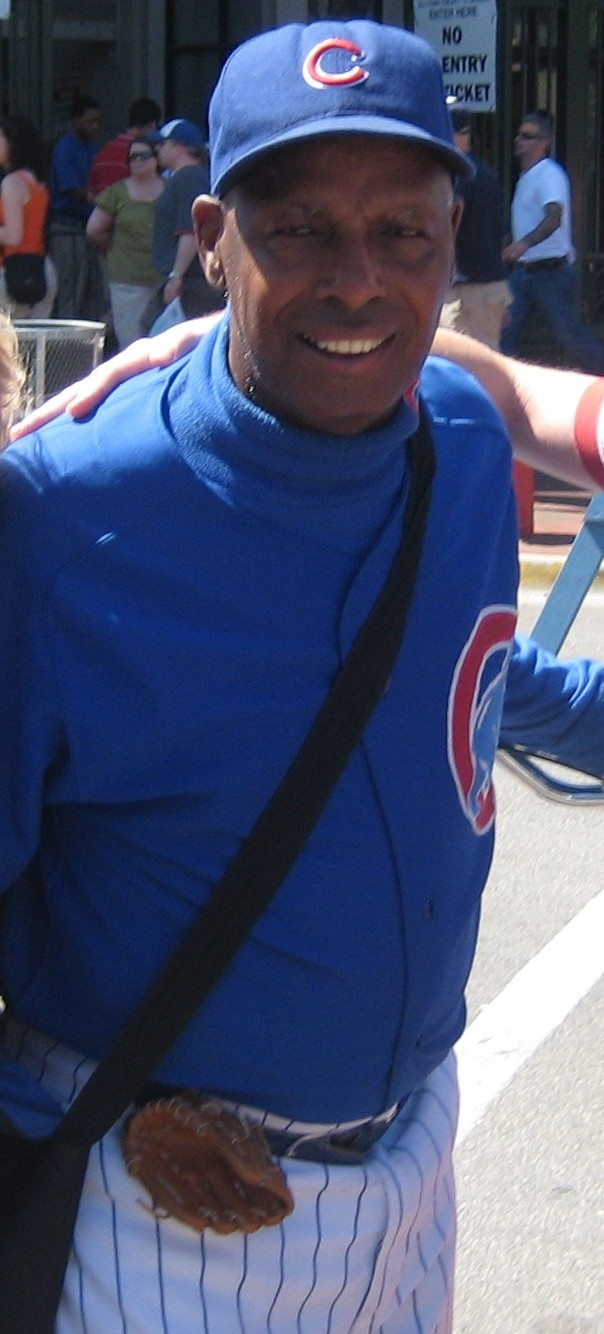
Ronnie Woo Woo in 2008

Ronnie "Woo Woo" Wickers (born October 31, 1941) is a longtime Chicago Cubs fan and local celebrity in the Chicago area. He is known to Wrigley Field visitors for his idiosyncratic cheers at baseball games, generally punctuated with an exclamatory "Woo!" (e.g., "Cubs, woo! Cubs, woo! Big-Z, woo! Zambrano, woo! Cubs, woo!") Longtime Cubs announcer Harry Caray dubbed Wickers "Leather Lungs" for his ability to shout for hours at a time.

Wickers grew up on the South Side of Chicago. Born premature and abused by his mother, he was raised by his grandmother, who brought him to his first Chicago Cubs games during the late 1940s. Wickers explained in a 2004 Chicago Tribune interview that he started "wooing" in 1958 or 1959. "It just came to be. I had fun with it," he remarked. He has remained a fixture at Wrigley Field ever since, even singing "Take Me Out to the Ball Game" during a May 24, 2001 game. In 2005, filmmaker Paul Hoffman released a documentary film about Wickers, called WooLife. The film premiered at the Chicago Historical Society.

Wickers worked nights as a custodian at Northwestern University for much of his life. After the deaths of both his grandmother and girlfriend in the 1980s, a distraught Wickers found himself homeless and without a stable job. From 1984 to 1990, he attended Cubs games with donated tickets. Wickers was absent at Wrigley Field games for a brief period in 1987, which prompted some Cubs fans to worry that he had died. He eventually contacted news organizations to say that he was alive and well.

Since 1990, most of Wickers' income has come from washing windows in the neighborhood around Wrigley Field. He also makes paid appearances at parties and has starred in local commercials. In 2000, Chicago radio host Erich “Mancow” Mueller bought Woo Woo a set of dentures to improve his appearance. Mancow spoke about this daily and had Woo Woo in the office and on the air at Q101 many times.

Wickers was treated and released from Advocate Illinois Masonic Medical Center after being hit by a motorist after a Cubs game on April 18, 2005. He has since recovered.

A minor controversy occurred after April 19, 2017, when Wickers was ejected from a Cubs game for not having a ticket. Wickers said that he had an electronic ticket, on the phone of a friend. According to Cubs management, the friend became verbally abusive when asked to produce the e-ticket, and the two were escorted out of Wrigley Field. Subsequently, Wickers attended Cubs games without further incident.

As of 2024, Wickers is still attending Cubs games, taking pictures with fans and tourists, and supporting the team.

== See also ==
- Andy the Clown
- Robert Szasz
- Robin Ficker
- Wild Bill Hagy
