= Wild Bill Hagy =

American baseball spectator

William Grover Hagy
- Born: June 17, 1939; Edgemere, Maryland, U.S.
- Died: August 20, 2007 (aged 68); Arbutus, Maryland, U.S.
- Other name: "Wild Bill"
- Occupation: Cab driver
- Known for: "O-R-I-O-L-E-S" cheer

William Grover "Wild Bill" Hagy (June 17, 1939 – August 20, 2007) was an American baseball fan and cab driver from Dundalk, Maryland. A superfan of the Baltimore Orioles, he was made famous for leading the "O-R-I-O-L-E-S" chants during the late 1970s and early 1980s from section 34 in the upper deck at Memorial Stadium.

== Life ==
Hagy grew up in the working class neighborhood of Sparrows Point, Maryland, adjacent to the steel mills of Baltimore's waterfront. He reportedly was married "more times than Elizabeth Taylor", and worked part-time as a Good Humor man for over a dozen years selling ice cream to children. He was a cab driver for many years.

== Orioles ==
Prior to the Orioles arrival in Baltimore in 1954, Bill was a Brooklyn Dodgers fan and player of the board game All Star Baseball. When the Orioles arrived, he immediately became a fan of his new home team. Up to Fall 1976, he attended 30 to 40 games a season, though he never did anything that stood out, other than creating rhyming cheers that he and his buddies would yell out. For example, for Frank Robinson they would chant, "Come on, Robby, put it in the left field lobby". His rhymes were catchy and he developed about 20 regular cohorts who would join him; they were local to Dundalk and would meet at Ed's Inn to drink, and then go to the game and belt out rhymes. They became known as the "Rowdies". At the time, Bill was driving a cab for North Point Cab Company. He did a stint working at the stadium stocking the walk-in beer cooler. One night he accidentally locked himself in. On another night when Yankees fans asked for a ride in his cab, he stopped and asked them to leave the vehicle when they refused to remove their hats.

Hagy's fame began during the 1977 season. As background, he knew Lenny "The Big Wheel" Burrier, who attended Baltimore Colt's football games where he spelled out cheers with his arms and body. Hagy asked if Burrier could do the same at Orioles games. Burrier declined saying he was not a baseball fan; but Hagy was free to copy his style. Thus in the early part of the 77' season Hagy began body-spelling his chants, attired in cut-off jeans, t-shirt, a straw cowboy hat, thick beard and sunglasses. Yet he received little notice except among his immediate group the Rowdies. Then in July, the Yankees came, and for the first time Hagy's cheers could be heard spread by the crowd throughout the stadium, and the players on the field heard it too. It became known as "The Roar from Thirty-Four". The next day, Brooks Robinson gave an interview in the paper saying how much the Orioles cheer meant to him and the players. Things quickly took off: Hagy was invited to meet the players, and he became a topic for various newspaper articles. The team recognized his positive influence and let him do his Orioles cheers from atop the dugout. 1978 was largely a repeat of 1977. However 1979 was the year of "Orioles Magic" as fan attendance significantly increased. Hagy was now Baltimore-famous. A common refrain among Bill's fans was "Wild Bill, Make it Stop": this referred to an incident in the early 1980s when the game was halted for rain. Bill got up, swept his hat in circles above his head like scooping up the rain, and the rain stopped.

Between 1978 and around 1982, Hagy was more than a baseball mascot but also a Maryland political mascot. On September 25, 1979, Mayor Donald Schaefer declared it "Wild Bill Hagy Day" in Baltimore. He later received a proclamation from the Maryland State Senate. Hagy's fame led him to meet presidents such as Jimmy Carter and Ronald Reagan, and to get write ups in The New York Times. He received numerous requests for appearances by charitable organizations, including as honorary chairman of the Cerebral Palsy Bowl-a-Thon. Although he never graduated from Sparrows Point High School, he was asked to teach a class at Johns Hopkins University, "How To Watch and Enjoy a Major League Baseball Game", which include instructions on how to drink beer without missing any of the action. A local clothing manufacture produced an 'Official Wild Bill Hagy Hat', while the Orioles sold Wild Bill t-shirts and megaphones. Country singer Bub Duskin released two songs, "The Wild Bill Fight Song" and "Tales of Wild Bill"; the fight song contained sound effects of the crowd taped in Section 34. He appeared on Good Morning America and was interviewed by the Associated Press.

Brooks Robinson credited Bill and the section 34 Rowdies with not only revitalizing baseball enthusiasm in Baltimore, but as a unique phenomenon in the country. According to Bill, his reign of fame lasted about 7 years (1978-1985). He declared "My life as a public figure is done". He complained he could once fill his cooler for $4.50 and buy a ticket for $3. Then they stopped letting fans bring their own beer and tickets cost $20. "The other thing though, it was wearing itself out. It started becoming something I had to do instead of something I wanted to do."

=== Section 34 ===
Hagy said that ever since he began attending games in 1954, he always sat behind home plate in the upper deck. Starting in 1979, he chose Section 34 down the right field line in the upper deck because it was general admission, and there was a men's room at the bottom of the ramp. Section 34 of Memorial Stadium was described as similar to a working class neighborhood tavern, where regulars came and sat in the same seats, where people "met, broke up, became couples and got married and had kids." It was the power base for Wild Bill, his cheerleaders and his community that spread the enthusiasm for the Orioles. Prior to 1979 the Orioles stadium was rarely sold out and while the sport had fans the city did not have a strong "love affair" with baseball, it was primarily a football town. This changed in 1979 with new and more exciting radio broadcasters, and the rise of Hagy and Section 34. From 1979 until Memorial Stadium closed, Hagy described it as a "81-game party every year".

=== "O!" ===
Hagy introduced the tradition of shouting the letter "O" during the national anthem at sporting events in the Baltimore area.

Since its introduction at Orioles games by Wild Bill Hagy et al in 1979, it has been a tradition at Orioles games for fans to accent the line of "Oh, say does that Star-Spangled Banner yet wave" in "The Star-Spangled Banner" by yelling "O!" "O" is not only short for Oriole, but the vowel is also a stand-out aspect of the Baltimorean accent. This tradition is even carried out during the Orioles' spring training home games in Sarasota, Florida, as well as Baltimore Ravens, Maryland Terrapins, and other sporting events for Maryland-based teams, including away appearances in other states.

=== Boycott of Memorial Stadium ===
In 1985, Orioles team management announced a ban that would prevent Hagy from bringing his own beer into Memorial Stadium. At the end of the last game prior to the ban’s enactment, Hagy downed ten bottles of beer before tossing his cooler onto the field in protest.

Hagy then declared a personal boycott against Memorial Stadium, which he maintained until the stadium’s 1991 closure. Hagy returned to Camden Yards on September 6, 1995 – the night Cal Ripken Jr. broke the longtime record for consecutive games played.

== Death ==
Hagy's last known O-R-I-O-L-E-S cheer was performed at Ripken's Hall of Fame induction ceremony in Cooperstown, New York, on July 29, 2007. He died at his home in Arbutus, Maryland, less than a month after the ceremony, at the age of 68. He was found unresponsive by his roommate on August 20, 2007, and efforts by paramedics to revive him were unsuccessful.

== Orioles honors ==
Hagy is in the Orioles Hall of Fame.

On Tuesday, June 17, 2008, the Baltimore Orioles honored "Wild" Bill Hagy by handing out honorary #34 T-shirts on their "T-shirt Tuesday."

On Saturday, August 9, 2014, the Orioles honored Hagy with a "Wild Bill" hat give away.

== See also ==
- Andy the Clown
- Robert Szasz
- Robin Ficker
- Ronnie Woo Woo
