= Craig Rice =

Craig Rice may refer to:

- Craig Rice (author) (1908–1957), pseudonym of Georgiana Ann Randolph Walker Craig, American author of mystery novels and short stories
- Craig L. Rice (born 1972), American politician
- Craig Rice (music producer) from Paisley Park Records
