= Andy the Clown =

American clown

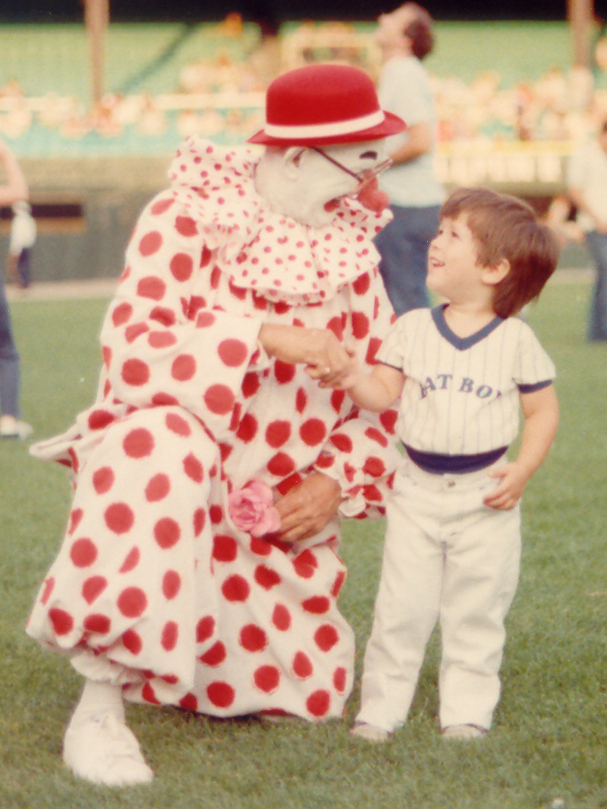
- Rozdilsky circa 1983
- Born: Andrew Rozdilsky Jr. December 6, 1917; Chicago, Illinois
- Died: September 21, 1995 (aged 77); Chicago, Illinois
- Occupation: clown
- Military career
- Allegiance: United States
- Branch: United States Army
- Service years: 1942–1943
- Rank: Private
- Conflicts: World War II

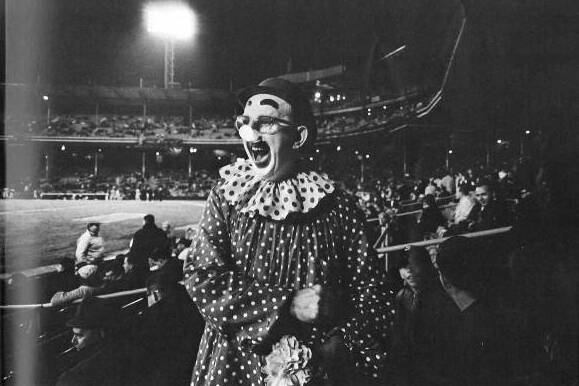
Rozdilsky was known for cheering "Come on, you White Sox!"

Andrew Rozdilsky Jr. (December 6, 1917 – September 21, 1995) was an American clown. As Andy the Clown, he was well-known for performing at Chicago White Sox games at the original Comiskey Park from 1960 to 1990.

== Early life ==
Andrew Rozdilsky Jr., the youngest of five brothers and one sister, was born in Chicago to a family of Polish descent. Rozdilsky grew up on the Southwest Side of Chicago and began clowning at ten years old to amuse his family. As a teenager, Rozdilsky worked as a hot dog vendor at Comiskey Park. In the early 1940s, he worked as a drill press operator before being drafted into the U.S. Army in March 1942. He completed his military service in June 1943 when he was discharged due to a pre-existing medical condition. Upon returning to civilian life, Rozdilsky worked as a hearse driver before being hired as a research clerk at International Harvester. Rozdilsky also began working on the side as a clown in the 1940s, doing his routine at parties and luncheons and visiting numerous hospital patients.

== Career ==
Although a lifelong White Sox fan and a clown since childhood, Rozdilsky only made his first appearance in costume at Comiskey Park in 1960. Rozdilsky dressed as a clown one day to amuse his friends from a local bowling league, and they encouraged him to attend a White Sox game with them in the outfit. Performing as Andy the Clown, Rozdilsky became popular with the crowd. By coincidence, Rozdilsky won White Sox season tickets for 1961 in a Knights of Columbus raffle, and soon began to attend almost every game as Andy the Clown. In the early part of his career, Rozdilsky had no official status and was not paid for his performances at White Sox games; he was only able to appear consistently because he happened to have won season tickets. Not restricting himself to baseball, Rozdilsky also occasionally clowned at other professional sporting events, including Chicago Bears games. In addition to his prolific appearances in Chicago, Rozdilsky was hired by Charlie Finley to perform at Oakland Athletics games at the new Oakland Coliseum for a short time in 1968.

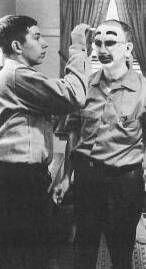
Rozdilsky being made up as Andy the Clown

As Andy the Clown, Rozdilsky's physical trademarks were a suit covered with polka dots and a battery-powered nose which would light up when he shook a child's hand. He was known for his distinctive cheer, "Come on, you White Sox!" He could hold the word "on" for over 45 seconds. Comedian Bob Newhart reportedly joked that Rozdilsky was louder than an air raid siren. Rozdilsky made some risqué jokes as Andy the Clown. During a White Sox–Cubs exhibition game in 1981, for instance, he sat on Chicago Mayor Jane Byrne's lap, put his arm around her, lit up his nose, and then with double entendre quipped to her husband Jay McMullen, "Jay, your wife is turning me on."

In the 1980s, Rozdilsky came into conflict with White Sox management after the team was purchased by Jerry Reinsdorf and Eddie Einhorn. On August 27, 1981, the Sox returned from a road trip in first place, and the organization informed Rozdilsky that he would no longer be allowed to attend games dressed as a clown. At the same time, the team introduced new mascots Ribbie and Roobarb. The news was poorly received by the public. WLS-TV anchor Al Lerner led a public campaign demanding that Rozdilsky be allowed back as Andy the Clown and the White Sox reversed their decision within one day. From 1981, Rozdilsky became officially sanctioned by the team, now being paid a $1000-per-year stipend, but he was required to remain in the upper deck. Rozdilsky did not strictly observe this restriction, sneaking into the Golden Boxes when fans would call him by name. Rozdilsky alleged that ownership did not deliver on a promise of lifetime box seats, and so both he and the organization had breached their verbal contract. Despite the animosity, Rozdilsky commented, "You can be anti-Einhorn, but you can't be anti-Sox. I say, if you can't fight it, join 'em." Still, Rozdilsky was openly critical of management, even participating in rallies to keep the White Sox in Chicago as ownership proposed a move to the suburbs. Despite their conflict, the White Sox honored Rozdilsky before a game in 1985 for his 25 years of service.

The longevity of Rozdilsky's presence at White Sox games was notable. He attended all three All-Star games at Comiskey Park — in 1933, he was a vendor, in 1950, he was a fan, and in 1983, he was a clown. Rozdilsky took pains to appear even when it was difficult. He appeared at the 1980 home opener despite having suffered a heart attack shortly prior; he only missed one home opener between 1961 and 1990 (in 1989, due to the death of his wife). In 1983, Rozdilsky attended a game within an hour of being released from the hospital where he was being treated for a bleeding ulcer.

Rozdilsky was forced to retire at the conclusion of the 1990 season, the last played at the original Comiskey Park. On September 28, the White Sox presented Rozdilsky with a commemorative plaque; he quipped that he had wished for something more significant, such as a new TV. Rozdilsky's daughter Ruth characterized the retirement as "tough", noting that "For a while [Andy] put the Cubs on at home."

After being forced into retirement, Rozdilsky continued to attend White Sox games at New Comiskey Park. No longer allowed into the stadium wearing his clown makeup, he instead wore a jacket which read "Andy the Clown". Rozdilsky continued to maintain his trademark cheers even after shedding his costume and upset team ownership by quietly accepting small tips for taking photos with fans. Rozdilsky continued to appear as Andy the Clown at community events until his death in 1995.

== Death and legacy ==
Rozdilsky died on September 21, 1995, at his home on the Southwest Side of Chicago after suffering a heart attack. Rozdilsky was the last clown regularly associated with Major League Baseball. While Emmett Kelly and Max Patkin, among others, clowned prominently (especially in the 1940s and 1950s), Rozdilsky outlasted these other baseball clowns. Andy the Clown was one of the last MLB mascots to be an actual individual person as opposed to a costumed character, as well as the last to have an "outsider" or "grassroots" origin rather than being a creation of team management. With Rozdilsky's departure and passing, combined with the 1988 retirement of Ribbie and Roobarb—‌the mascots who, despite being intended to replace Andy, were outlasted by him—‌the White Sox would not have another mascot until the 2004 introduction of a new costumed mascot, Southpaw.

== See also ==
- Ronnie Woo Woo
- Robert Szasz
- Robin Ficker
- Wild Bill Hagy
