= Robert Szasz =

- Occupations: Real estate developer; heckler

Robert Szasz, also known as The Happy Heckler, is a real estate developer who is known for being a heckler at Tampa Bay Rays baseball games for several seasons.

A native of Toronto, Ontario, Szasz relocated to Florida in 1984 and resides in Clearwater, Florida. He held season tickets for the then Devil Rays from 2000 until the end of the 2008 season, sitting in club seats behind home plate at Tropicana Field. He would choose one player from the opposing team to insult during a game or series, waiting until the player stepped into the batter's box before shouting a barrage of insults regarding the player's playing ability. Between the typically small and quiet crowds at Devil Rays game during the early 2000s and his booming voice, Szasz's heckling was often heard on television and radio broadcasts of the team's games.

Szasz's heckling visibly rattled players on multiple occasions. He once heckled the Mariners' Bret Boone so viciously that when Boone struck out, he threw down his batting helmet and started yelling back at Szasz. In another instance, outfielder José Guillén offered Szasz an autographed baseball bat if he would stop heckling him in a game. Szasz says he didn't heckle with profanity, nor did he insult a player about a personal thing such as weight or height. He says he tried to only heckle a player on their baseball ability.

Szasz became a controversial figure. Some fans, television viewers, and media that covered the Rays complained about his volume and abrasiveness, while others enjoyed his heckling.

In 2008, Szasz released a book entitled The Happy Heckler. Szasz did not renew his Rays season tickets for 2009 and was not heard heckling in Tropicana Field again until April 30, 2012, during a game against the Seattle Mariners.

== See also ==
- Ronnie Woo Woo
- Robin Ficker
- Wild Bill Hagy
