= Richard A. La Vay =

American politician

Member of the Maryland House of Delegates from the 15th district
- In office January 9, 1991 – January 8, 2003 Serving with Mark Kennedy Shriver
- Preceded by: Judith C. Toth
- Succeeded by: Kathleen M. Dumais; Brian J. Feldman

Personal details
- Born: July 16, 1953 (age 73) Nassau County, New York, U.S.
- Party: Republican
- Education: Mount St. Mary's University (BS)
- Profession: Homebuilder

Richard A. La Vay (born July 16, 1953), is an American politician and businessman who served as a member of the Maryland House of Delegates for District 15, which covers western Montgomery County, Maryland. First elected in 1990, Delegate La Vay served for 12 years before he decided not to seek reelection in 2002. In the 2002 election, Kathleen M. Dumais and Brian J. Feldman won seats vacated by La Vay and Mark K. Shriver.

== Early life and education ==
Born in Nassau County, New York, La Vay graduated from Mount St. Mary's College, in Emmitsburg, Maryland. He received his Bachelor of Science degree in economics in 1975. He later attended American University. La Vay attended Naval War College from 2005 to 2007, where he studied strategy and policy.

== Career ==
La Vay started his career as principal and Chief Financial Officer for the La Vay Companies, from 1978 until 1995. In addition to his work, he is active in several community organizations. He was a board member of Citizens for Fair Representation in 1992. He was also president of the Stepping Stones Homeless Shelter in Rockville, Maryland in 1994. He is a member of the Maryland Building Industry Association.

La Vay has received several awards over his career, including 1st Place in the Finest for Family Living by the Suburban Maryland Building Industry Association (SMBIA). He also received the Alexandria Civil Neighborhood Revitalization Award. La Vay is a regular contributor to the Washington Post Sunday Section with an article called "Close to Home".

=== Maryland Legislature ===
Over his 12 years in the Maryland House of Delegates, La Vay was a member of the Economic Matters Committee from 1991 through 1994, and again from 1997 through 2003. He was selected to be the Minority Whip from 1995 until 1996. Additionally, he was a member of the Appropriations Committee, Rules and Executive Nominations Committee, and the Legislative Policy Committee, from 1995 until 1996. He was on the Joint Committee on the Selection of the State Treasurer in 1996. the Special Joint Committee on Competitive Taxation and Economic Development from 1996 until 1997, the Joint Committee on Fair Practices from 1997 until 1998 and the Joint Advisory Committee on Legislative Data Systems from 1999 until 2003. Finally, he served on the Special Committee on Gaming from 2001 until 2003 and was a member of the Bi-County Committee and the Montgomery County Delegation.

== Election results ==
- 1998 Race for Maryland House of Delegates – District 15

Name	Votes	Percent	Outcome
Mark K. Shriver, Dem.	26,114	22%	Won
Jean B. Cryor, Rep.	22,160	19%	Won
Richard LaVay, Rep.	18,395	16%	Won
David B. Dashefsky, Dem.	17,818	15%	Lost
William Ferner Askinazi, Rep.	16,882	14%	Lost
Anthony Patrick Puca, Dem.	16,841	14%	Lost

- 1994 Race for Maryland House of Delegates – District 15

Name	Votes	Percent	Outcome
Mark K. Shriver, Dem.	20,696	20%	Won
Jean Cryor, Rep.	18,804	18%	Won
Richard La Vay, Rep.	17,214	17%	Won
Stuart D. Schooler, Dem.	15,882	15%	Lost
Elizabeth Tookie Gentilcore, Dem.	15,325	15%	Lost
Davis M. Richardson, Rep.	15,847	15%	Lost

- 1990 Race for Maryland House of Delegates – District 15

Name	Votes	Percent	Outcome
Jean W. Roesser, Rep.	21,052	1%	Won
Gene W. Counihan, Dem.	20,059	18%	Won
Richard A. La Vay, Rep.	18,896	17%	Won
Rosemary Glynn, Dem.	18,196	16%	Lost
Sally McGarry, Dem.	17,652	16%	Lost
Michael J. Baker, Rep.	16,347	15%	Lost
