= Brian Feldman (politician) =

American politician (born 1961)

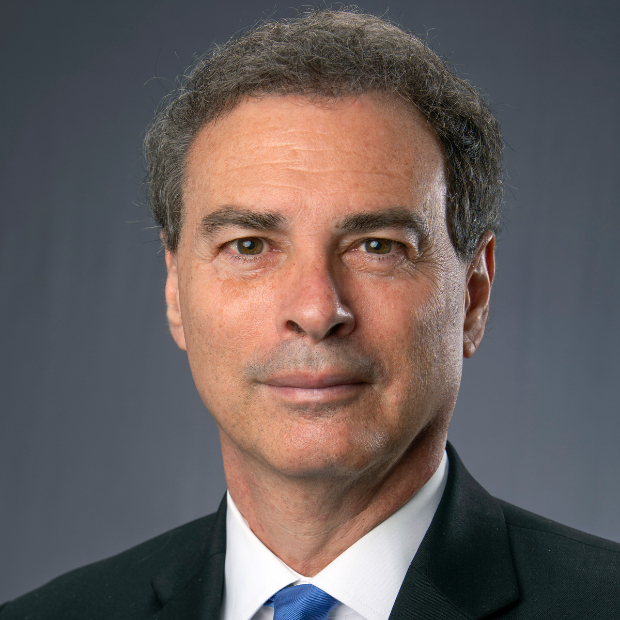

Majority Leader of the Maryland Senate
- Designate
- Assuming office January 13, 2027
- Succeeding: Nancy J. King

Member of the Maryland Senate from the 15th district
- Incumbent
- Assumed office September 12, 2013
- Preceded by: Robert J. Garagiola

Member of the Maryland House of Delegates from the 15th district
- In office January 8, 2003 – September 12, 2013
- Preceded by: Mark Shriver; Richard A. La Vay
- Succeeded by: David Fraser-Hidalgo

Personal details
- Born: Brian Jeffrey Feldman; February 4, 1961 (age 65) Pittsburgh, Pennsylvania, U.S.
- Party: Democratic
- Children: 2
- Education: Pennsylvania State University (BS); University of Pittsburgh (JD); Johns Hopkins University (MA)
- Occupation: Attorney

Brian Jeffrey Feldman (born February 4, 1961) is an American politician and a member of the Maryland Senate representing District 15 since 2013. A member of the Democratic Party, he is the majority leader-designate of the Maryland Senate, succeeding Nancy J. King. Feldman previously served in the Maryland House of Delegates representing District 15 from 2003 to 2013.

Born and raised in Pittsburgh, Feldman graduated from Pennsylvania State University, the University of Pittsburgh School of Law, and Johns Hopkins University. Before entering politics, Feldman worked as an attorney for Price Waterhouse and the United States Department of Justice Tax Division. He was elected to the Maryland House of Delegates in 2002 and reelected in 2006 and 2010. He was appointed to the Maryland Senate in September 2013, following the resignation of Robert J. Garagiola, and subsequently elected to a full term in 2014. Feldman was reelected in 2018 and 2022.

== Background ==
Feldman was born in Pittsburgh, where he graduated from Taylor Allderdice High School. He attended Pennsylvania State University, where he earned a Bachelor of Science degree in accounting in 1983, and the University of Pittsburgh School of Law, where he earned his Juris Doctor degree in 1986. Feldman later attended Johns Hopkins University, where he earned a Master of Arts degree in government in 2000.

After graduating from law school, Feldman worked as an attorney and certified public accountant for Price Waterhouse until 1988, when he began working as a trial attorney for the United States Department of Justice Tax Division. He has worked as an adjunct professor for Johns Hopkins University since 2006, and for the University of Maryland, College Park since 2019.

== In the legislature ==
Feldman was sworn into the Maryland House of Delegates on January 8, 2003. He was a member of the House Economic Matters Committee during his entire tenure, including as the chair of its banking, economic development, and science & development subcommittee from 2007 to 2013. He also served as the chair of the Jount Technology Oversight Committee and the Joint Information Technology and Biotechnology Committee. Feldman was a member of the Montgomery County Delegation, serving as its chair from 2007 to 2012, and the Maryland Veterans Caucus.

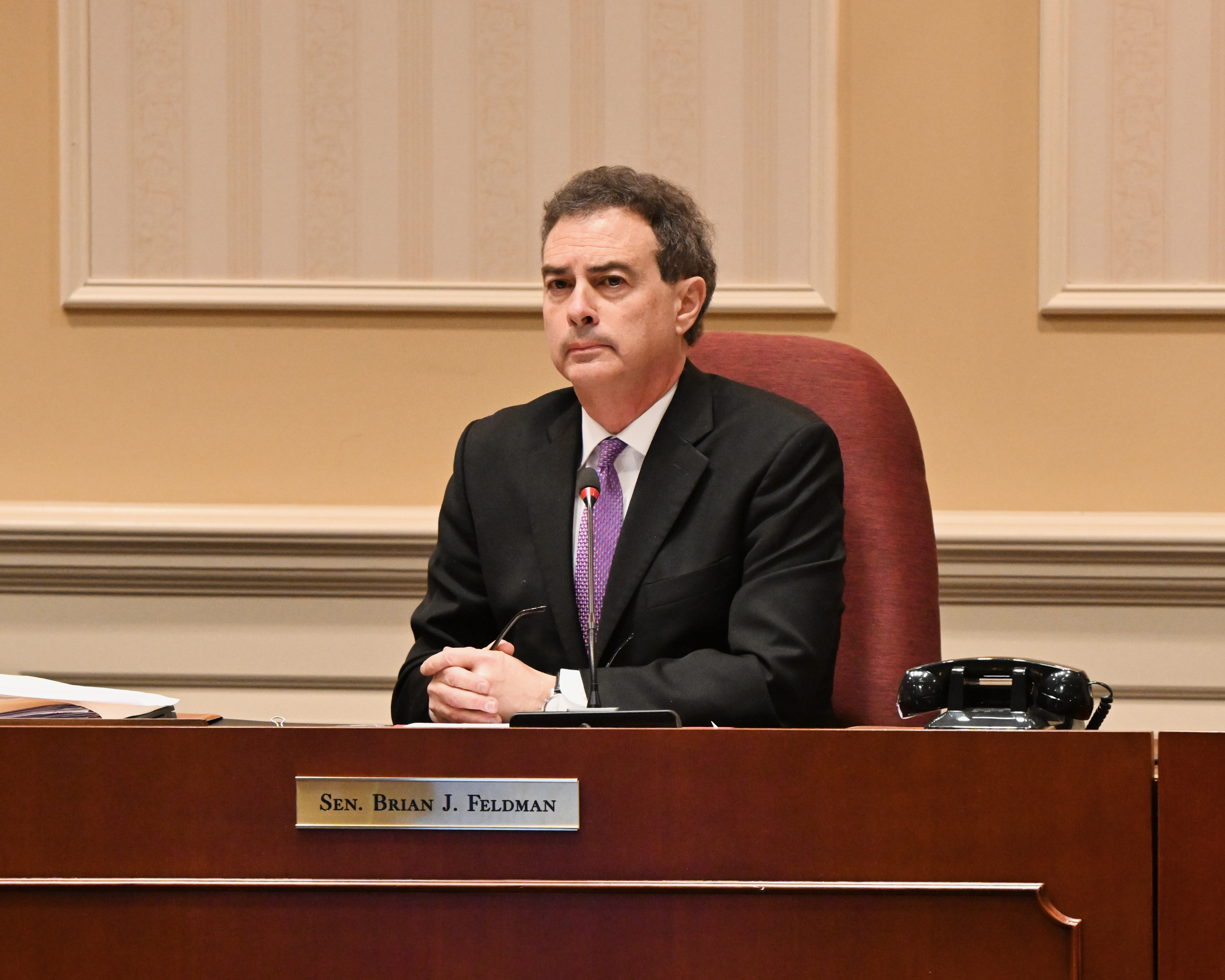
Feldman in the Education, Energy, and the Environment Committee, which he chaired from 2023 to 2026.

In June 2013, state senator and then-Senate Majority Leader Robert J. Garagiola announced that he would resign from the Maryland Senate on September 1. Feldman applied to fill the vacancy and faced no formal opposition in the selection process following the withdrawal of his opponents. On September 10, 2013, the Montgomery County Democratic Central Committee voted unanimously to nominate Feldman to fill the vacancy left by Garagiola. He was appointed to the Maryland Senate by Governor Martin O'Malley on September 12, 2013. Feldman successfully ran for election to a full term in the Maryland Senate in 2014, defeating perennial candidate Robin Ficker in the general election.

During his tenure in the Maryland Senate, Feldman served as a member of the Finance Committee from 2013 to 2022, including as its vice chair from 2019 to 2022, and as the chair of its transportation, health, and energy & public utilities subcommittees. From 2023 to 2026, he served as the chair of the Education, Energy, and the Environment Committee. Feldman has also served as the member of the Rules Committee, the Legislative Police Committee, and the Joint Committee on Legislative Ethics since 2019, and as a member of the Joint Federal Action Oversight Committee since 2025.

In October 2026, Senate President Bill Ferguson named Feldman as the next majority leader and chief of policy of the Maryland Senate. He was also named as the chair of the Senate Rules Committee and as the chamber's economic development chief.

== Political positions ==
=== Environment ===
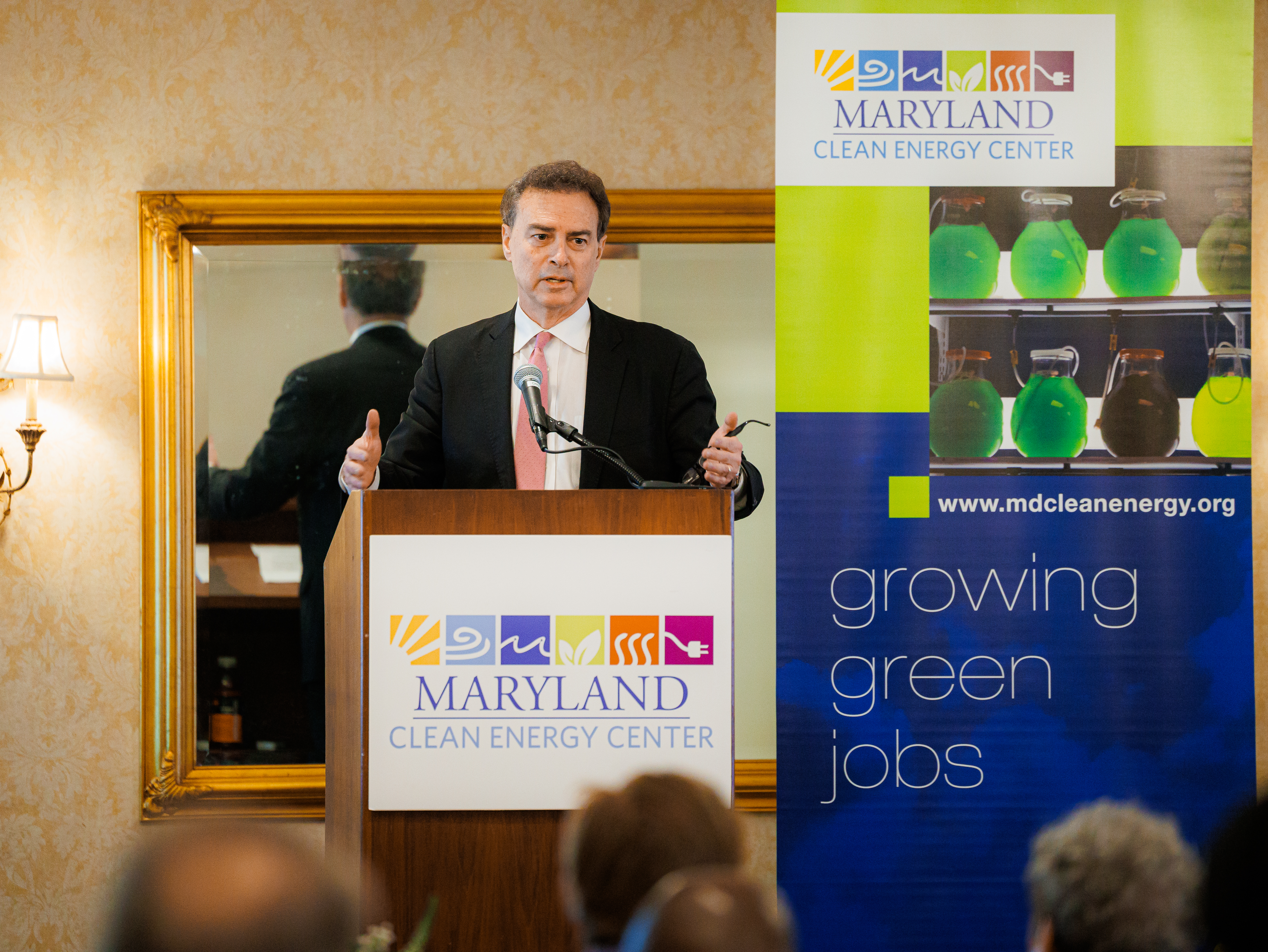
Feldman speaks at a Maryland Clean Energy Center legislative reception, 2025

During the 2018 legislative session, Feldman introduced the Clean Energy Jobs Act, which would require that half of Maryland's power comes from renewable sources by 2030. The bill was reintroduced in 2019, during which it passed and became law without Governor Larry Hogan's signature.

In 2021, Feldman criticized a Hogan administration proposal that sought to scale back the state's vehicle emissions testing program, later amending a bill to limit the Maryland Motor Vehicle Administration's ability to implement changes to its emissions inspection program.

During the 2023 legislative session, Feldman supported the Promoting Offshore Wind Energy Resources (POWER) Act, which sets a goal of achieving 8.5 gigawatts of wind power generation in Maryland by 2031 and strengthens labor standards for offshore wind manufacturing and maintenance. The bill passed and was signed into law by Governor Wes Moore in April 2023.

=== Health care ===
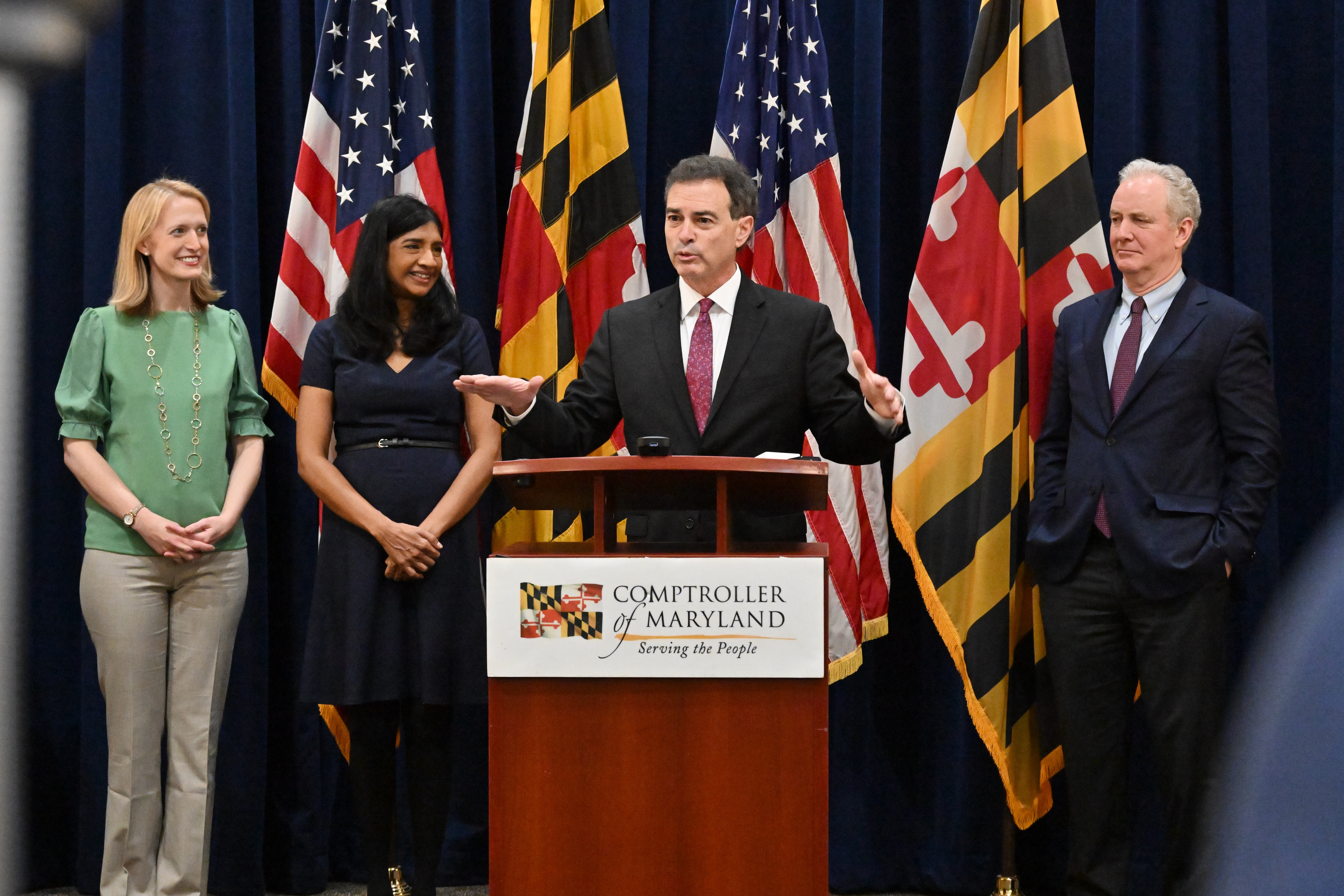
Feldman speaks at a Maryland Health Care for All! news conference, 2023

During the 2018 legislative session, Feldman introduced the Protect Maryland Health Care Act, a bill that would reinstate the Affordable Care Act's (ACA) individual shared responsibility provision following its repeal under the Tax Cuts and Jobs Act of 2017. The bill would combine the money collected under the mandate with federal tax credits to pay for health care coverage for uninsured individuals. The bill failed to move out of committee, and was reintroduced in 2019, during which it was amended to create a guide on state tax forms to help uninsured individuals sign up for Medicaid or subsidized health plans. The amended bill was signed into law by Governor Larry Hogan on May 13, 2019.

During the 2019 legislative session, Feldman introduced a bill to establish a Prescription Drug Affordability Board, which would have the power to set upper payment limits on select prescription drugs.

In December 2019, after the Fifth Circuit Court of Appeals struck down several provisions of the ACA in its ruling in California v. Texas, Feldman promised to enshrine as many of the ACA's provisions into state law as he could. During the 2020 legislative session, he introduced and passed legislation to codify the ACA's consumer protections provisions, including cost sharing limits, pre-existing conditions protections, and keeping dependents on a parents' health insurance plan up to age 26.

During the 2020 legislative session, Feldman introduced a bill that would allow 16- and 17-year-olds to get vaccinated without parental permission.

During the 2021 legislative session, Feldman introduced a bill banning medical debt collection agencies from garnishing the wages or placing liens on homes of people who owed medical debt, and limiting payments made toward medical debt at five percent of a person's income. The bill unanimously passed the Maryland General Assembly and became law without Governor Larry Hogan's signature. Also in 2021, he introduced a bill to create a pilot program to allow young adults to enroll for health insurance coverage for as little as $1 a month. The bill passed and became law without Hogan's signature. In 2023, Feldman introduced a bill to extend this program.

=== Israel ===
In November 2023, Feldman and eight other state senators signed a joint letter that threatened to defund immigrants rights group CASA de Maryland because it had called for an immediate ceasefire in the Gaza war and condemned the "utilization of US tax dollars to promote the ongoing violence."

=== Marijuana ===
During the 2020 legislative session, Feldman introduced a bill that would allow students with authorized medical cannabis cards to take medical cannabis on school grounds.

During the 2021 legislative session, Feldman introduced a bill to legalize recreational marijuana, taxed at 10 percent and gradually increasing to 20 percent by 2027, and decriminalize possession of marijuana up to four ounces for adults 21 years or older. The bill failed to move out of committee. The bill was reintroduced in 2022, during which it passed the Maryland Senate on a voice vote.

During the 2022 legislative session, Feldman introduced legislation to ban the sale of Delta-8. He later amended the bill to limit its sale to adults aged 21 and older.

During the 2023 legislative session, Feldman introduced and passed a bill to legalize adult use cannabis in Maryland and create a regulatory framework for Maryland's cannabis industry.

=== National politics ===
During the 2019 legislative session and following the 2018-2019 federal government shutdown, Feldman introduced a bill to provide temporary assistance to "essential" government employees during government shutdowns. The bill passed and was signed into law by Governor Larry Hogan on March 26, 2019.

In 2008, Feldman successfully ran for delegate to the Democratic National Convention in Maryland's 8th congressional district, pledged to U.S. Senator Barack Obama. In July 2019, he endorsed former Vice President Joe Biden for president.

=== Social issues ===
In 2017, Feldman introduced a bill that would prohibit ticket sales companies from restricting the resale of tickets to concerts or sporting events.

During the 2019 legislative session, Feldman introduced a bill to deregulate the state's craft brewery industry, increasing the limits on how many barrels a brewery could produce a year and loosening franchise restrictions on small breweries. The bill passed unanimously and was signed into law by Governor Larry Hogan.

During the 2023 legislative session, Feldman introduced and passed a bill that would require four-year public universities to develop a plan to provide students with access to emergency contraception and abortion services.

=== Transportation ===
In 2018, Feldman introduced the Maryland Metro/Transit Funding Act, a bill that would pay $167 million to the Washington Metropolitan Area Transit Authority (WMATA) as part of a cost sharing agreement between Maryland, Virginia, and the District of Columbia to help the agency pay for new rail cars and maintenance. The bill was signed into law by Governor Larry Hogan on April 25, 2018.

In July 2019, Feldman criticized Maryland Transportation Secretary Pete Rahn's decision to withhold $55.6 million in funding from WMATA and questioned whether the state had the legal authority to withhold these funds.

== Electoral history ==
Maryland House of Delegates District 15 Democratic primary election, 2002
Party	Candidate	Votes	%
Democratic	Brian Feldman	7,290	29.6
Democratic	Kathleen Dumais	6,331	25.7
Democratic	John Young	5,887	23.9
Democratic	Jinhee Wilde	5,104	20.7

Maryland House of Delegates District 15 election, 2002
Party	Candidate	Votes	%
Republican	Jean B. Cryor (incumbent)	20,584	18.7
Democratic	Brian Feldman	19,719	17.9
Democratic	Kathleen Dumais	19,246	17.5
Democratic	John Young	17,358	15.8
Republican	Bill Askinazi	16,693	15.2
Republican	Mary Kane	16,579	15.0
Write-in		42	0.0

Maryland House of Delegates District 15 election, 2006
Party	Candidate	Votes	%
Democratic	Kathleen Dumais (incumbent)	25,781	21.6
Democratic	Brian Feldman (incumbent)	25,760	21.6
Democratic	Craig L. Rice	20,202	17.0
Republican	Jean B. Cryor (incumbent)	20,050	16.8
Republican	Brian Mezger	14,112	11.8
Republican	Chris Pilkerton	13,174	11.1
Write-in		55	0.0

Maryland House of Delegates District 15 election, 2010
Party	Candidate	Votes	%
Democratic	Kathleen Dumais (incumbent)	23,476	20.7
Democratic	Brian Feldman (incumbent)	23,120	20.4
Democratic	Aruna Miller	21,353	18.9
Republican	Scott Graham	15,298	13.5
Republican	Sylvia J. Darrow	14,490	12.8
Republican	Matthew Mockerman	13,477	11.9
Libertarian	Arvin Vohra	1,910	1.7
Write-in		54	0.0

Maryland Senate District 15 Democratic primary election, 2014
Party	Candidate	Votes	%
Democratic	Brian Feldman (incumbent)	7,472	100.0

Maryland Senate District 15 election, 2014
Party	Candidate	Votes	%
Democratic	Brian Feldman (incumbent)	19,925	60.4
Republican	Robin Ficker	13,028	39.5
Write-in		44	0.1

Maryland Senate District 15 election, 2018
Party	Candidate	Votes	%
Democratic	Brian Feldman (incumbent)	38,771	72.0
Republican	David Wilson	15,000	27.9
Write-in		46	0.1

Maryland Senate District 15 election, 2022
Party	Candidate	Votes	%
Democratic	Brian Feldman (incumbent)	33,264	73.0
Republican	David Wilson	12,231	26.9
Write-in		46	0.1
