= Kathleen Dumais =

American politician

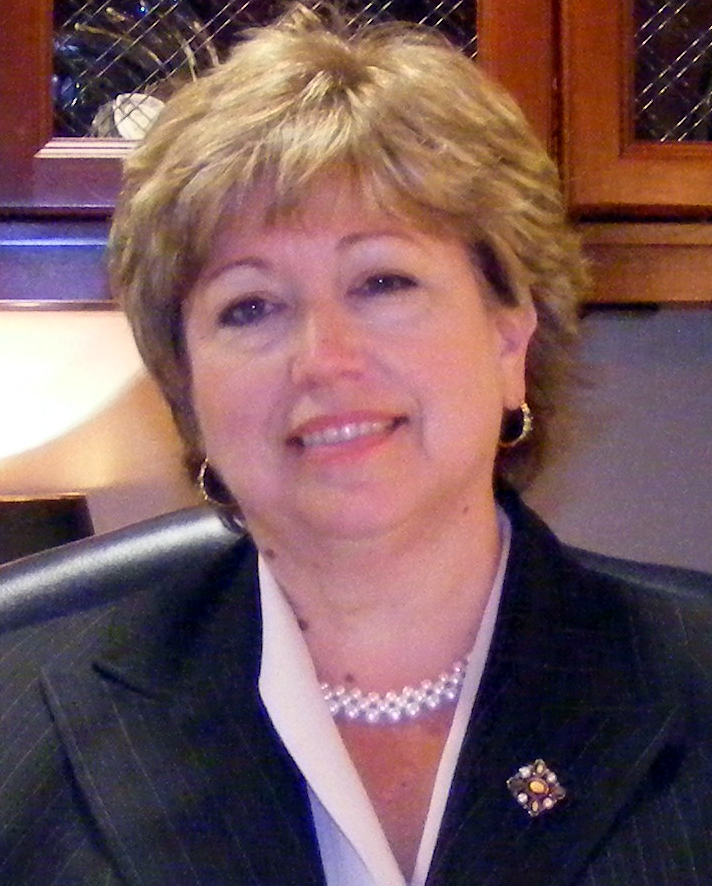

Majority Leader of the Maryland House of Delegates
- In office January 9, 2019 – September 9, 2019
- Preceded by: William Frick
- Succeeded by: Eric Luedtke

Member of the Maryland House of Delegates from the 15th district
- In office January 8, 2003 – November 5, 2021 Serving with David Fraser-Hidalgo, Lily Qi
- Preceded by: Richard A. La Vay; Mark K. Shriver
- Succeeded by: Linda Foley

Personal details
- Born: July 5, 1958 (age 68) La Jolla, California, U.S.
- Party: Democratic
- Education: St. Vincent Pallotti High School, Laurel, Maryland
- Alma mater: Mount Vernon Seminary and College (BA); University of Maryland, Baltimore (JD)
- Website: Official website

Kathleen M. Dumais (born July 5, 1958) is an American politician who represented the 15th District of the Maryland House of Delegates, encompassing the western and northern portions of Montgomery County. Born in La Jolla, California, Dumais grew up in Maryland and eventually pursued a degree at the University of Maryland School of Law. As an attorney, she specialized in family and juvenile law and had a career-long interest in education, at one point working as a teacher in Montgomery County Public Schools.

In 2002, Dumais was elected to the House of Delegates from District 15, which includes Potomac, Germantown, and a large swath of rural northern Montgomery County. She sat on the Judiciary Committee and has served on the Special Committee on Drug and Alcohol Abuse, the Rules and Executive Nominations Committee, and as the Parliamentarian for the House of Delegates.

Dumais was the Majority Leader of the House of Delegates in 2019.

In November 2021, Dumais resigned from the House of Delegates after being appointed to serve on the Montgomery County Circuit Court bench by Governor Larry Hogan.

== Legislative notes ==
- voted for the Clean Indoor Air Act of 2007 (HB359)
- voted for the Healthy Air Act in 2006 (SB154)
- voted against slots in 2005 (HB1361)
- voted in favor of in-state tuition for illegal immigrants in 2007 (HB6)
- voted in favor of slots (HB4) in the 2007 Special session

== Awards ==
- 2005 Legislative Award from the Maryland Network Against Domestic Violence (MNADV)
- 2007 Public Policy Award from the Maryland Coalition Against Sexual Assault (MCASA)
- 2008 Legislator of the Year Award from the Maryland Legislative Agenda for Women (MLAW)
- 2009 Public Policy Award from the Maryland Chapter of the National Academy of Elder Law Attorneys

== Election results ==
- 2006 Race for Maryland House of Delegates – District 15

Voters to choose three:

| Name | Votes | Percent | Outcome |
|---|---|---|---|
| Kathleen M. Dumais, Dem. | 25,781 | 21.6% | Won |
| Brian J. Feldman, Dem. | 25,760 | 21.6% | Won |
| Craig L. Rice, Dem. | 20,202 | 17.0% | Won |
| Jean B. Cryor, Rep. | 20,050 | 16.8% | Lost |
| Brian Mezger, Rep. | 14,112 | 11.8% | Lost |
| Chris Pilkerton, Rep. | 13,174 | 11.1% | Lost |

- 2002 Race for Maryland House of Delegates – District 15

Voters to choose three:

| Name | Votes | Percent | Outcome |
|---|---|---|---|
| Jean B. Cryor, Rep. | 20,584 | 18.7% | Won |
| Brian J. Feldman, Dem. | 19,719 | 17.9% | Won |
| Kathleen M. Dumais, Dem. | 19,246 | 17.5% | Won |
| John Young, Dem. | 17,358 | 15.8% | Lost |
| William Ferner Askinazi, Rep. | 16,693 | 15.2% | Lost |
| Mary Kane, Rep. | 16,579 | 15.0% | Lost |
| Other Write-Ins | 42 | 0.0% | Lost |

Maryland House of Delegates
| Preceded by William Frick | Majority Leader of the Maryland House of Delegates; 2019 | Succeeded by Eric Luedtke |
