= Craig L. Rice =

American politician

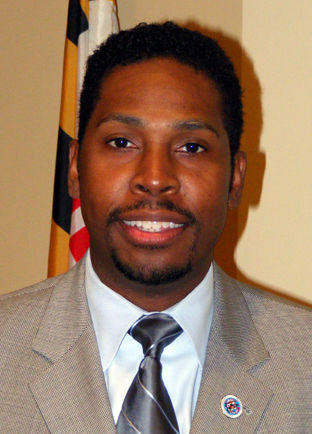

Member of the Montgomery County Council from the 2nd district
- In office December 6, 2010 – December 5, 2022
- Preceded by: Mike Knapp
- Succeeded by: Marilyn Balcombe

Member of the Maryland House of Delegates from the 15th district
- In office January 10, 2007 – December 5, 2010
- Preceded by: Jean B. Cryor
- Succeeded by: Aruna Miller

Personal details
- Born: Craig Lamont Rice; September 27, 1972 (age 53) Washington, D.C., U.S.
- Party: Democratic
- Spouse: Tineshia Rice
- Children: 3
- Education: University of Illinois Urbana-Champaign; University of Maryland, College Park (BS)

Craig Lamont Rice (born September 27, 1972) is an American politician and former member of the Montgomery County Council, serving from 2010 to 2022. Elected in 2006 to the Maryland House of Delegates, he served one four-year term and represented District 15 in western and northern Montgomery County.

== Early life and education ==
Rice was born in a Washington, D.C. hospital but raised in the suburbs of Montgomery County, Maryland. He graduated from Montgomery Blair High School. He attended the University of Illinois, majoring in aerospace engineering. Following a family tragedy, Rice returned home and transferred to University of Maryland, where he majored in computer science.

Prior to entering politics, Rice was a senior sales manager for Marriott International.

== Personal life ==
He is married to Tineshia "Tia" Rice, the owner of AnaLyn Studio Salon located in downtown Bethesda. He is father of three children, Alex, Anaiya, and Caelyn.

== Political career ==
Rice was elected in 2006 to serve in the state house with incumbents Kathleen Dumais and Brian Feldman, defeating incumbent Jean Cryor, Montgomery County's lone Republican representative. He served on the House Ways and Means Committee and the Montgomery County delegation's Land Use and Transportation Committee. While in the legislature, Rice worked as a business development consultant for the government of Puerto Rico.

In 2010, Rice won a five-way Democratic primary for Montgomery County Council, District 2. He defeated Republican Robin Ficker in the General Election. This, at the time, made him the youngest African American to serve on the Council and only the second African American man to serve in that role. Rice served on the Council's Education Committee and the Health and Human Services Committee, becoming Chair of the Education Committee in 2013. In 2013, Rice was elected the Council President, succeeding Nancy Navarro.

Rice was re-elected to the County Council in 2014. In 2015, Rice began organizing Education Budget Forums throughout the County. Rice was appointed to the Kirwan Commission on public education in Maryland, where he chairs the commission’s work group on early childhood education.

Rice was re-elected to a third term on the County Council in 2018. Rice has received many awards over the course of his career. In 2018 he received the 2018 Metropolitan Kappa Youth Foundation Cornerstone Award for Education and Leadership.

In 2019, Rice received The Montgomery County Board of Education’s Award for Distinguished Service to Public Education Community Individual.

== Election results ==
- 2018 Race for Montgomery County Council – District 2

Voters to choose one:

| Name | Votes | Percent | Outcome |
|---|---|---|---|
| Craig L. Rice, Dem. | 50,111 | 71.1% | Won |
| Ed Amatetti, Rep. | 20,271 | 28.8% | Lost |

- 2014 Race for Montgomery County Council – District 2

Voters to choose one:

| Name | Votes | Percent | Outcome |
|---|---|---|---|
| Craig L. Rice, Dem. | 25,823 | 59.5% | Won |
| Dick Jurgena, Rep. | 17,516 | 40.4% | Lost |

- 2010 Race for Montgomery County Council – District 2

Voters to choose one:

| Name | Votes | Percent | Outcome |
|---|---|---|---|
| Craig L. Rice, Dem. | 33,398 | 59.39% | Won |
| Robin Ficker, Rep. | 22,754 | 40.46% | Lost |

- 2006 Race for Maryland House of Delegates – District 15

Voters to choose three:

| Name | Votes | Percent | Outcome |
|---|---|---|---|
| Kathleen M. Dumais, Dem. | 25,781 | 21.6% | Won |
| Brian J. Feldman, Dem. | 25,760 | 21.6% | Won |
| Craig L. Rice, Dem. | 20,202 | 17.0% | Won |
| Jean B. Cryor, Rep. | 20,050 | 16.8% | Lost |
| Brian Mezger, Rep. | 14,112 | 11.8% | Lost |
| Chris Pilkerton, Rep. | 13,174 | 11.1% | Lost |
