= Maryland Legislative District 15 =

American legislative district

Maryland's legislative district 15
- Represents part of Montgomery County
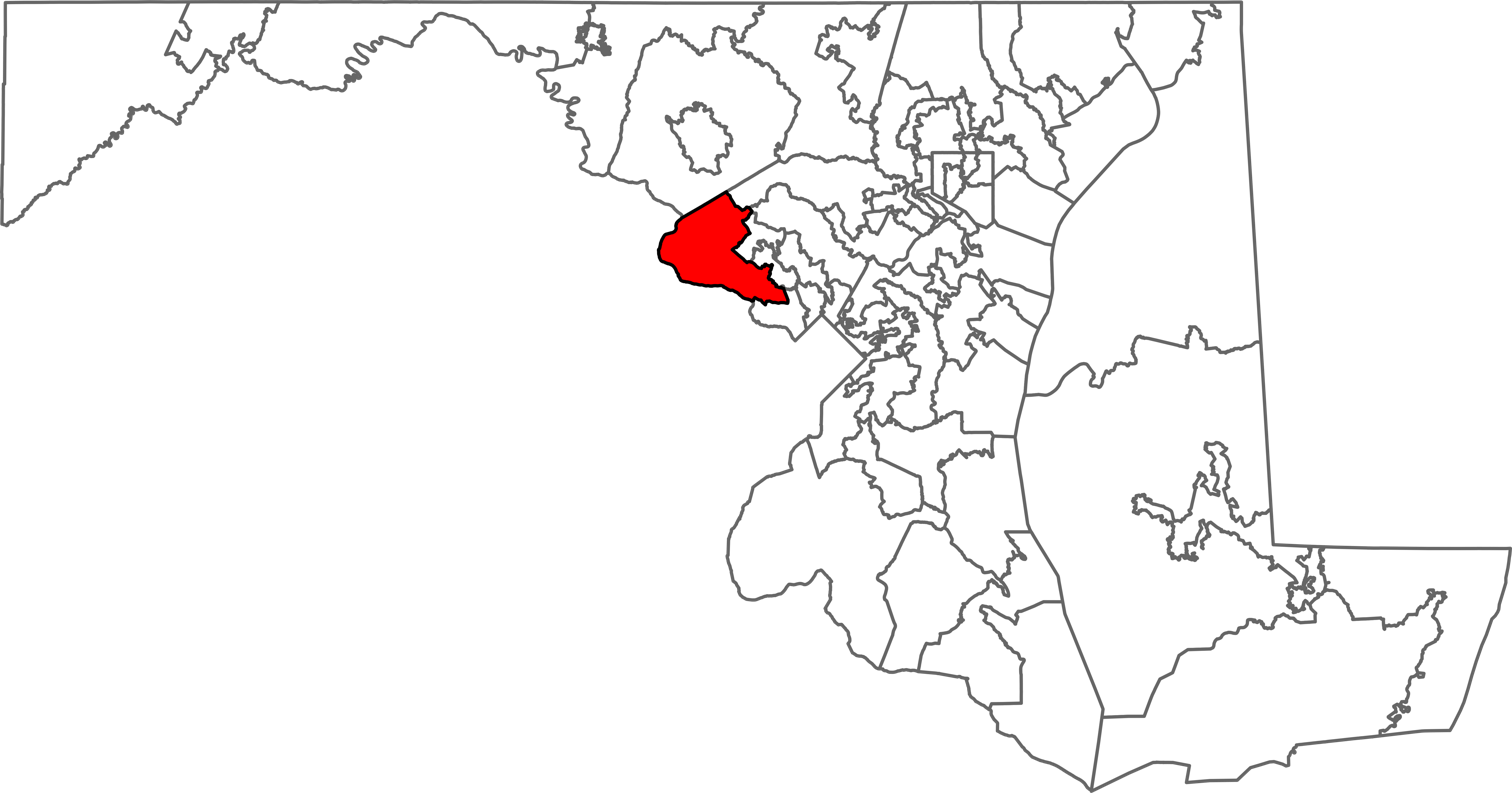
- Senator: Brian J. Feldman (D)
- Delegate(s): Linda Foley (D); David Fraser-Hidalgo (D); Lily Qi (D)
- Registration: 53.8% Democratic; 18.8% Republican; 26.0% unaffiliated
- Demographics: 45.9% White; 13.5% Black/African American; 0.3% Native American; 26.8% Asian; 0.0% Hawaiian/Pacific Islander; 4.1% Other race; 9.3% Two or more races; 10.6% Hispanic
- Population (2020): 133,574
- Voting-age population: 101,640
- Registered voters: 92,931

Maryland Legislative District 15 is one of 47 districts in the state for the Maryland General Assembly. It covers part of Montgomery County. The district is represented by three delegates in the Maryland House of Delegates.

== Demographic characteristics ==
As of the 2020 United States census, the district had a population of 133,574, of whom 101,640 (76.1%) were of voting age. The racial makeup of the district was 61,332 (45.9%) White, 18,066 (13.5%) African American, 441 (0.3%) Native American, 35,782 (26.8%) Asian, 41 (0.0%) Pacific Islander, 5,431 (4.1%) from some other race, and 12,468 (9.3%) from two or more races. Hispanic or Latino of any race were 14,195 (10.6%) of the population.

The district had 92,931 registered voters as of October 17, 2020, of whom 24,178 (26.0%) were registered as unaffiliated, 17,494 (18.8%) were registered as Republicans, 50,015 (53.8%) were registered as Democrats, and 797 (0.9%) were registered to other parties.

== Political representation ==
The district is represented for the 2023–2027 legislative term in the State Senate by Brian J. Feldman (D) and in the House of Delegates by Linda Foley (D), David Fraser-Hidalgo (D) and Lily Qi (D).

== Election history ==
=== Multi-member Senate district (1967–1975) ===
Years	Senator	Party	Electoral history	Years	Senator	Party	Electoral history
January 18, 1967 – January 13, 1971	Robert P. Dean	Democratic	Redistricted from Queen Anne's County at-large and re-elected in 1966. Lost re-election.	January 18, 1967 – January 13, 1971	Harry Hughes	Democratic	Redistricted from Caroline County at-large and re-elected in 1966. Retired.
January 13, 1971 – January 10, 1973	Robert Bauman	Republican	Elected in 1970. Resigned.	January 13, 1971 – January 8, 1975	Elroy G. Boyer	Democratic	Elected in 1970. Redistricted to the 34th district.
October 7, 1973 – January 8, 1975	John C. Miller	Republican	Appointed to serve the remainder of Bauman's term. Redistricted to the 34th district.	January 13, 1971 – January 8, 1975	Elroy G. Boyer	Democratic	Elected in 1970. Redistricted to the 34th district.

=== Single-member Senate district (1975–present) ===
Years	Senator	Party	Electoral history
January 8, 1975 – January 11, 1995	Laurence Levitan	Democratic	Elected in 1974. Re-elected in 1978. Re-elected in 1982. Re-elected in 1986. Re-elected in 1990. Lost re-election.
January 11, 1995 – January 8, 2003	Jean Roesser	Republican	Elected in 1994. Re-elected in 1998. Lost re-election.
January 8, 2003 – September 1, 2013	Robert J. Garagiola	Democratic	Elected in 2002. Re-elected in 2006. Re-elected in 2010. Resigned.
September 12, 2013 – present	Brian Feldman	Democratic	Appointed to serve the remainder of Garagiola's term. Elected in 2014. Re-elected in 2018. Re-elected in 2022. Re-elected in 2026.
