= Robert J. Garagiola =

American politician

Robert John Garagiola
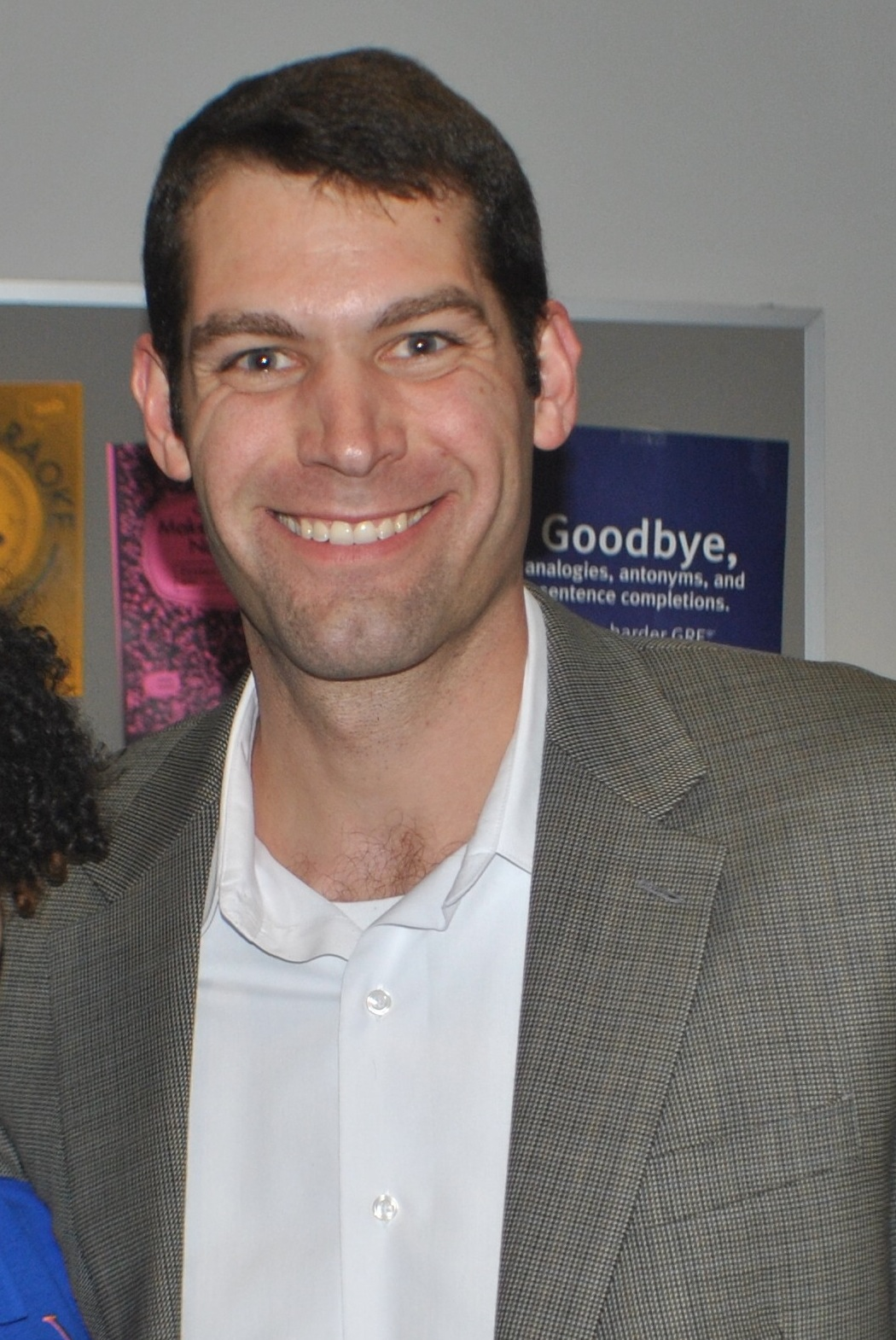
- Garagiola in 2012

Majority leader of the Maryland Senate
- In office 2011–2013

Member of the Maryland Senate from the 15th district
- In office January 8, 2003 – September 1, 2013
- Preceded by: Jean W. Roesser
- Succeeded by: Brian Feldman

Personal details
- Born: September 5, 1972 (age 54) Warren, Michigan, U.S.
- Party: Democratic
- Spouse: Hannah
- Children: 5
- Education: Rutgers College, B.A. (political science), 1994 George Washington University Law School, J.D., 2001
- Occupation: Lawyer, politician
- Website: www.robgaragiola.org

Robert J. Garagiola (born September 5, 1972) is an American lawyer and former politician from the state of Maryland. A Democrat, he had represented District 15 in north-western Montgomery County in the Maryland State Senate.

== Early life and family ==
Garagiola was born in Warren, Michigan to Ken and Marge Garagiola. In 1979, he and his family moved to the suburbs of Indianapolis, Indiana. In 1981, his family moved to the suburbs of St. Louis, Missouri. At age 10, his family moved, again, to Oceanside, California, a northern suburb of San Diego. On September 5, 1988, his family moved once more to Cape May County, New Jersey.

After graduating from Ocean City High School in 1990, Rob attended Rutgers College in New Brunswick, New Jersey. In 1994, he received his B.S. in Political Science. During his years as an undergraduate, Rob joined Phi Kappa Psi fraternity, served as the Rutgers Chapter president in 1993 and District 1 Archon from 1994 to 1995. He is a graduate of The George Washington University Law School.

In 1994, Rob moved to Germantown, Maryland, with his college girlfriend. Shortly thereafter, they married and had three children.

He was a U.S. Army Reserves paratrooper, 1995–2001, attaining the rank of sergeant. He was entitled to wear the parachutist badge (2000) and Commendation Medal (2001).

He was admitted to the bar in 2001, and is licensed to practice in law in Maryland, the District of Columbia, before the U.S. Supreme Court, United States District Court for the District of Maryland, and the U.S. Court of Appeals, 4th Circuit. He practices business law, real estate law, and employment law.

After his separation in 2011 and divorce, he remarried in 2013.

== Maryland Senate ==
Garagiola was elected to the Maryland Senate in 2002, and re-elected in 2006, 2010 and served until September 1, 2013. He was Deputy Majority Leader, and then Majority Leader. He was Senate Chair for the Joint Committee on Children, Youth, and Families, and sat on the Finance Committee. He was also the Senate Chair of the Joint Committee on Health Care Delivery and Financing and Chairman of the Senate Democratic Caucus 2007–2011.

Bloggers speculated Garagiola might become a candidate for Congress in Maryland's 8th congressional district should current Congressman Chris Van Hollen seek another office.

On November 1, 2011, Garagiola announced his run for the newly redistricted Maryland's 6th congressional district, held by 10-term incumbent Republican Roscoe G. Bartlett. He secured endorsements from Governor Martin O'Malley, Senate President Thomas V. Mike Miller Jr. and House Minority Whip Steny H. Hoyer. In the primary election of April 3, 2012 he lost by 17% to a political newcomer John K. Delaney.

=== Resignation ===
In June 2013, Garagiola announced that he would retire on August 31, 2013. As he retired before the end of his term, Brian Feldman was appointed to fill his seat for the remainder of the term.
