= Robin Ficker =

American political activist and candidate (born 1943)

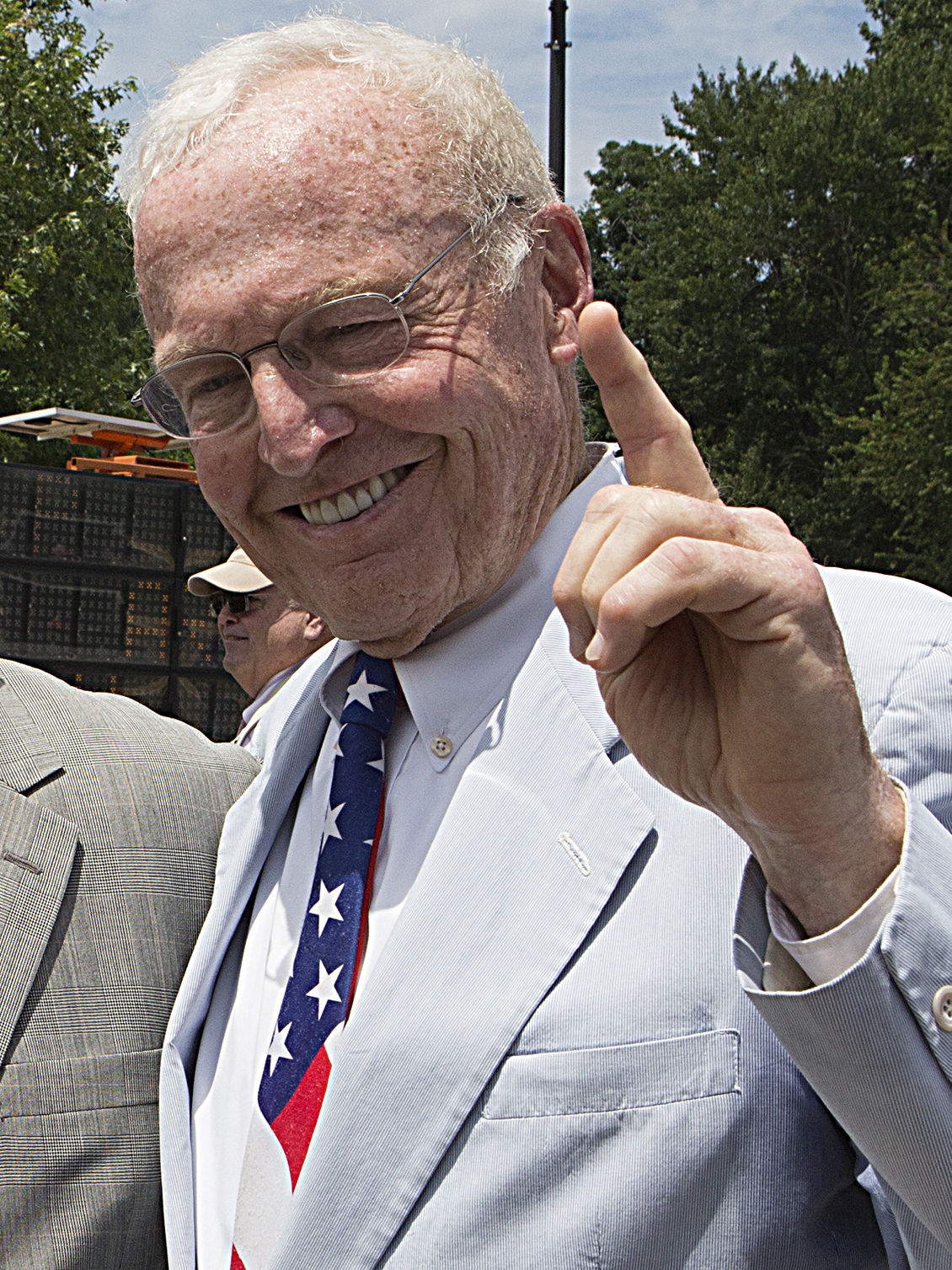
- Ficker in 2017

Member of the Maryland House of Delegates from the 15B district
- In office January 10, 1979 – January 12, 1983 Serving with Judith C. Toth
- Preceded by: Jay Bernstein
- Succeeded by: Constituency abolished

Personal details
- Born: Robin Keith Annesley Ficker; April 5, 1943 (age 83) Takoma Park, Maryland, U.S.
- Party: Democratic (before 1976); Independent (1976–1978); Republican (1978–present)
- Children: 3, including Desiree
- Education: United States Military Academy (attended); Case Western Reserve University (BS); University of Pennsylvania (attended); University of Baltimore (JD); American University (MPA)

Robin Keith Annesley Ficker (born April 5, 1943) is an American political activist, real estate broker, former attorney (disbarred), former state legislator, sports heckler, and perennial political candidate from Maryland.

Ficker served one term in the Maryland House of Delegates from 1979 to 1983, and has since run for other offices unsuccessfully numerous times.

== Early life and education ==
Ficker was born in Takoma Park, Maryland, attended Takoma Park Elementary, and graduated from Montgomery Blair High School.

Ficker attended the United States Military Academy for five semesters. He received a B.S. in electrical and mechanical engineering from Case Western Reserve University. Ficker attended the University of Pennsylvania Law School, receiving his J.D. from the University of Baltimore School of Law. He also received an M.A. in public administration from American University in 1969.

== Legal career ==
Ficker was a member of the Maryland Bar from 1973 until his disbarment in 2022. His first case, seeking to end the National Football League's blackout of sold-out home games, went to the Supreme Court of the United States. In 1973, Ficker, representing Deborah Drudge, gained a consent judgment signed by Federal District Court Judge Roszel C. Thomsen, forbidding evaluations based on facial features and physique, for positions in the office of the Montgomery County Attorney. The judgment said no future applicant could be asked questions about marital status or childcare arrangements. On January 6, 1986, U.S. District Court Judge Norman Ramsey ordered, in a suit brought by Ficker against the Montgomery County Board of Elections, that Md. Election Code Art. 33, S 23-5(4) limiting the payment of money to petition circulators for initiative measures be declared null and void under the First and Fourteenth Amendments.

Ficker won two landmark injunctions preventing the state of Maryland from denying access to serious traffic and criminal court records. In 1992, U.S. District Court Judge Eugene Nickerson granted Ficker an injunction against provisions of the Maryland Public Information Act that denied access to police reports, criminal charging documents, and traffic citations in the Maryland Automated Traffic System. A 2003 Attorneys General opinion said the 1992 "Ficker order is still in effect and enforceable". In 1997, in the United States Court of Appeals for the Fourth Circuit, Ficker successfully challenged the constitutionality of a Maryland law forbidding lawyers from targeted direct-mail solicitation of criminal and traffic defendants within 30 days of arrest.

In October 2009, represented by the American Civil Liberties Union, Ficker convinced parks officials in Montgomery and Prince George's Counties to rescind enforcement of a rule requiring a permit before a person could carry signs or solicit signatures in county parks. In 2013, Ficker represented a Hyattsville man who was found not guilty by a jury of all 23 counts in a case of attempted murder, armed robbery, carjacking, assault and eluding police, among other charges.

=== 2013 school discipline cases ===
In 2013, Ficker received widespread attention for securing school suspension reversals and disciplinary record expungement for children aged 5 to 7. A six-year-old in Maryland had been charged with threatening "to shoot a student" for pointing his finger and saying "pow". A Pennsylvania five-year-old was said to be making a "terroristic threat" by talking about a Hello Kitty bubble-blowing gun. A Virginia six-year-old had been suspended for pointing his finger at another student who pretended to shoot him with a bow and arrow after their class had studied Native American culture. A five-year-old Southern Maryland child had been suspended for 10 days for bringing a cap gun onto a school bus to show a friend. Still pending in Maryland is the matter of a suspended seven-year-old who chewed a toaster pastry into the shape of a gun.

=== Representation of Daron Dylon Wint ===
When ex-convict Daron Dylon Wint was arrested and charged in the deaths of three family members and their housekeeper, in which a ten-year-old child was tortured in order to extract money from the child's father, Ficker said Wint had not seemed violent when he defended him in earlier cases. "My impression of him —I remember him rather well —is that he wouldn't hurt a fly. He's a very nice person", Ficker said.

Ficker called Wint "kind and gentle" and said that authorities had arrested "the wrong guy" in the murder case: "They've made a big mistake here."

Wint was found guilty in 2018 and sentenced in 2019 to four consecutive terms of life in prison without the possibility of parole.

=== Controversies and disciplinary issues ===
In 1990, Ficker was publicly reprimanded by the Maryland Court of Appeals upon a finding that he had violated ethical rules prohibiting neglect, engaged in conduct prejudicial to the administration of justice, and lack of diligence.

In March 1998, he was indefinitely suspended from the practice of law, with the right to reapply for admission after 120 days, arising from violations related to competence, diligence, fairness to opposing counsel and parties, supervising lawyers and conduct prejudicial to the administration of justice.

In August 1998, Ficker was privately reprimanded by the Maryland Attorney Grievance Commission for a violation related to competence. In 2002, the Maryland Attorney Grievance Commission privately reprimanded him for a violation related to client communications. Ficker was again indefinitely suspended from the practice of law in 2007. A dissenting judge in that suspension commented, "If disbarment is not warranted in this case for these types of issues, with a respondent with this history, it will never be warranted." Ficker's law license was reinstated on December 8, 2008.

In 2017 the Maryland Court of Appeals reprimanded Ficker for arriving late to Howard County District Court for a hearing in December 2015. The Court of Appeals order also stated he violated the Maryland Rules of Professional Conduct in 2013 by hiring a disbarred lawyer in a non-lawyer capacity without alerting bar counsel.

In 2022, Ficker was found to have intentionally lied to a judge in 2019 and was disbarred by the Maryland Court of Appeals.

== Politics ==
Ficker has run for various state and local offices since the 1970s. In 1972, he ran for the Democratic nomination for the U.S. House of Representatives in Maryland's 8th congressional district, blanketing Montgomery County with "Our Friend Ficker" campaign signs on utility poles, trees and traffic lights, which resulted in county officials seeking an injunction to stop the placement of these signs on public property. He lost the Democratic primary to Joseph G. Anastasi.

In 1976, Ficker ran as an independent in Maryland's 8th congressional district. He finished third, with 11.0% of the vote, behind Republican Newton I. Steers Jr., with 46.8% and Democrat Lanny J. Davis with 42.2%.

In 1978, Ficker was elected to the Maryland House of Delegates as a Republican, representing Montgomery County from 1979 to 1983. He lost a 1980 primary in the 8th congressional district to former congressman Newton Steers (who had been defeated for re-election in 1978). Ficker lost his bid for re-election to the House of Delegates in 1982.

In 1984, Ficker secured the Republican nomination in the 6th congressional district. He was defeated in the general election by Democratic incumbent Beverly Byron, 65.1% to 34.9%.

He ran for the United States Senate in 2000, claiming to have shaken hands with more than 560,000 people before officially announcing his candidacy. Ficker unsuccessfully ran for Montgomery County Executive in 2006, receiving just under 10% of the vote.

In 2009, Ficker moved from his primary residence in Boyds to his childhood home in Colesville to run for the Montgomery County Council in District 4, where he won a three-way Republican primary with 58% of the vote. He lost to Democrat Nancy Navarro 61% to 35%. Moving back to Boyds in 2010, Ficker ran as a Republican for the Montgomery County Council seat in District 2. Ficker lost to State Delegate Craig L. Rice (D-Dist. 15), of Germantown, 59% to 40%.

Ficker was a candidate in the 2012 Republican primary for the newly redrawn 6th congressional district seat held by 10-term incumbent Roscoe Bartlett, finishing fifth in an eight-candidate field.

Ficker ran unopposed for the 2014 Republican nomination for the District 15 State Senate seat in western Montgomery County. Running with his son Flynn Ficker on a candidate slate for the Maryland Senate and House, the Fickers in May reported visiting 20,000 homes. Ficker lost the District 15 State Senate election to Democrat Brian J. Feldman, who won 60.4% of the vote to Ficker's 39.5%, while his son lost his contest for the House election.

In 2016, Ficker was again a candidate in a Republican primary, but this time for the 6th congressional district. He finished fourth in an eight-candidate field.

Ficker won the 2018 Republican nomination for Montgomery County Executive unopposed. He was initially turned down for public matching funds. His campaign filed a lawsuit and was later notified it qualified for the public funding shortly after the primary. Ficker faced Democrat Marc Elrich and Democrat-turned-Independent Nancy Floreen in the general election on November 6, 2018. Ficker finished third with 16.5% of the votes, behind Floreen with 19.2% and the winner, Elrich, with 64.3%.

In April 2020, Ficker was present at a rally in Annapolis that protested Governor Larry Hogan's stay-at-home orders. He was photographed holding a sign reading "Robin for Governor", apparently confirming reports that he planned to run in the 2022 Maryland gubernatorial election. In July 2022, he lost the Republican primary, placing third behind Kelly M. Schulz and Dan Cox. Ficker later endorsed Cox in the general election.

In March 2023, Ficker declared his candidacy for United States Senate to challenge incumbent U.S. Senator Ben Cardin in the 2024 election, but in May 2023, Cardin announced that he would not seek reelection in 2024. Ficker positioned himself as a protest candidate against former Maryland governor Larry Hogan in the Republican primary, aligning himself with former President Donald Trump, but heavily trailed Hogan in opinion polling. He was defeated by Hogan in the Republican primary election on May 14, 2024, garnering almost 30% of the vote.

In July 2025, Ficker declared his candidacy for the U.S. House of Representatives, challenging incumbent April McClain Delaney in the 2026 election. He won the Republican nomination with around 43% of the vote against two other candidates, but lost to McClain Delaney in the general election.

=== Ballot initiatives ===
Since 1974, Ficker has become known for promoting a series of ballot initiatives. The issues range from term limits, curbing tax increases, to limiting budget waste and duplication. He collected as many as 15,000 signatures for each of 20 initiatives, that together received 2 million votes.

A county initiative he proposed for the November 2008 ballot received 194,151 votes, prevailing by 5,060 votes. The measure requires the nine-member Montgomery County Council to vote unanimously to raise property tax revenue above the local limit. The victory earned him the Libertarian Party's Free Market Hero of the week award.

In the fall of 2015, Ficker began campaigning for a ballot measure in the 2016 general election to place term limits on the Montgomery County Executive and Montgomery County Council members. In 2016, Ficker's term limit initiative passed with 69% of the vote, limiting County Council members to three consecutive terms in office.

== Sports heckler ==
Ficker is known for his passionate support of the NBA's Washington Wizards. For many years, he heckled the opposing team at the games. Ficker had seats at USAir Arena, located in Landover, Maryland, immediately behind the visiting bench. When the Wizards moved to the new MCI Center in 1997, they took the opportunity to reseat Ficker well away from the opposing team's bench. He gave up his seats in response. Not having been to a Wizards' game since in April 1998, Ficker attended Game 4 of the Wizards-Pacers Eastern Conference Semifinals on May 11, 2014.

Though many players from opposing teams were not fans of Ficker, Phoenix Suns star Charles Barkley in particular thought so much of him and his ability to get under players' skin that he flew him out to Phoenix during the 1993 NBA Finals. Barkley bought Ficker a ticket directly behind the bench of the visiting Chicago Bulls, hoping that Ficker's taunts would distract the Bulls players. America West Arena security removed Ficker before the end of the first quarter.

In 2012, Ficker appeared on The Jeff Probst Show, and was playfully surprised by special guest Isiah Thomas, former professional basketball player and member of the Basketball Hall of Fame. Probst shared that Thomas, in agreeing to appear on the show, said "Ficker was one of the greats". In 2013, Ficker was featured on ESPN's Olbermann, in which his heckling was discussed along with the often acrimonious resulting fan vs. player interactions.

The University of Maryland wrestling team won Ficker's support in 2010 after he wrote a letter to The Washington Post criticizing the team's lack of coverage and attended the Atlantic Coast Conference Tournament in Raleigh, North Carolina, and the NCAA Division I Wrestling Championship in Omaha, Nebraska. His vocal and visible support remains ongoing as of 2015.

== Personal life ==
=== Family ===
Ficker has a daughter and two sons. His daughter, Desiree Ficker, is a top female professional triathlete, finishing second at the 2006 Ironman Triathlon World Championships in Kailua-Kona, Hawaii. Ficker's 20-year marriage to Frances Annette Ficker ended in divorce.

=== 1995 traffic incident ===
In 1996, Ficker was acquitted of destruction of property in a 1995 traffic incident and saw battery charges dropped by the State's Attorney after a jury deadlocked 10–2 in favor of acquittal. He had been convicted in a non-jury district court trial but appealed for a circuit court jury trial. In the traffic incident the pregnant driver of the car Ficker allegedly hit reported that he struck her in the face, breaking her glasses.
