= Judith C. Toth =

American politician

Member of the Maryland House of Delegates from the 15th district
- In office 1975–1990

Personal details
- Born: October 21, 1937 (age 88) Rochelle, Illinois, U.S.
- Party: Democratic
- Education: Northwestern University (BA); Johns Hopkins University (MPH)

Judith C. Toth (born October 21, 1937) is an American retired politician who served as a member of the Maryland House of Delegates from 1975 to 1990.

== Early life and education ==
Toth was born in Rochelle, Illinois in 1937. She attended an American high school in Sasebo, Japan before earning a Bachelor of Arts degree from Northwestern University in 1959. She later earned a Master of Public Health from the Johns Hopkins School of Public Health in 1989. Toth also took courses at Mexico City College, Georgetown University, the University of the Andes, Montgomery College, and the University of Maryland, College Park.

== Career ==
Prior to serving in the Maryland House of Delegates, Toth worked as an economist and businesswoman. She was elected to the House in 1974 and assumed office in 1975. During her tenure, Toth served as a member of the Environmental Matters Committee and Special Committee on Drug and Alcohol Abuse. In 1988, Toth announced that she would resign from the House at the end of her term, citing boredom with 90-day legislative sessions.
