= 2022 Maryland gubernatorial election =

- November 8, 2022
- Turnout: 49.26% ▼9.80%
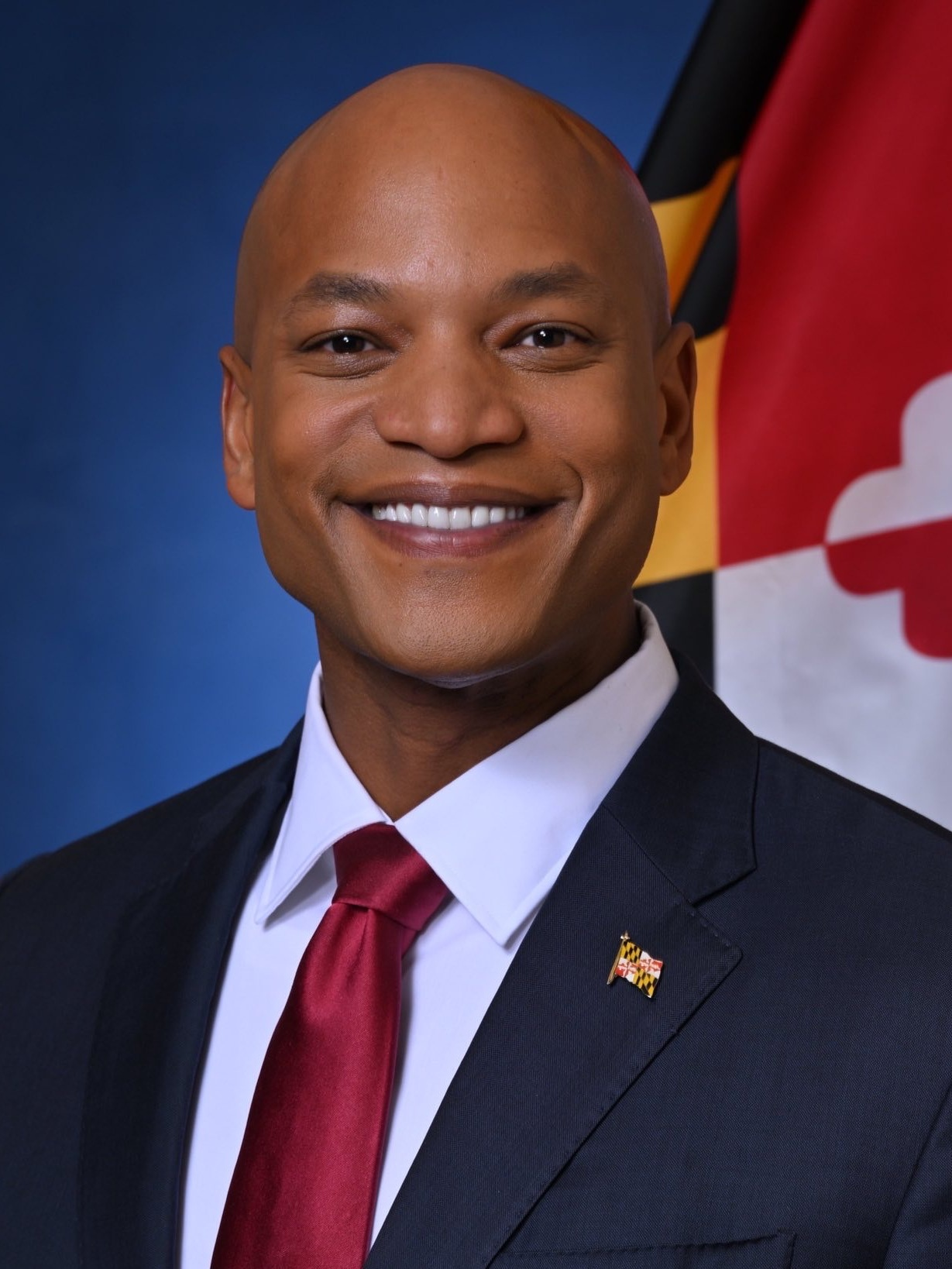

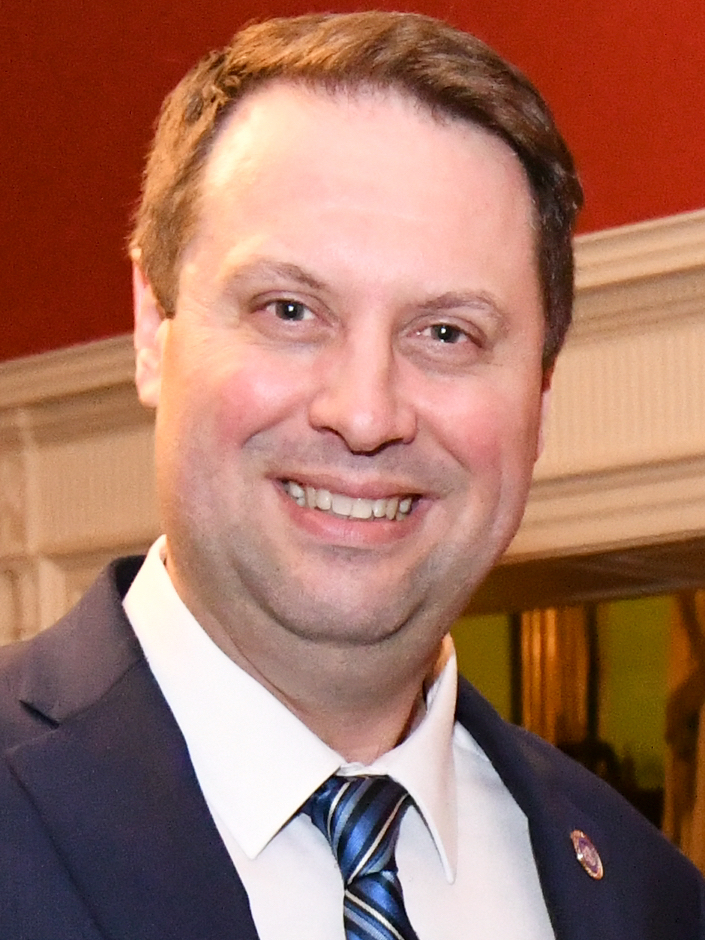
Nominee	Wes Moore	Dan Cox
Party	Democratic	Republican
Running mate	Aruna Miller	Gordana Schifanelli
Popular vote	1,293,944	644,000
Percentage	64.53%	32.12%
- Moore: 40–50% 50–60% 60–70% 70–80% 80–90% >90% Cox: 40–50% 50–60% 60–70% 70–80% 80–90%
Governor before election
Larry Hogan
Republican
Elected Governor
Wes Moore
Democratic

The 2022 Maryland gubernatorial election was held on November 8, 2022, to elect the next governor of Maryland. Incumbent Governor Larry Hogan was term-limited and could not seek a third consecutive term. This was the first gubernatorial election in which both parties' nominees for lieutenant governor were women.

The Democratic and Republican primaries were held on July 19, with state delegate Dan Cox securing the Republican nomination over the Hogan-endorsed Kelly Schulz, while author and former nonprofit CEO Wes Moore won the Democratic nomination over outgoing state Comptroller Peter Franchot and former U.S. secretary of labor Tom Perez. Political observers gave Moore a strong chance of defeating Cox in the general election, with Democrats outnumbering Republicans 2-to-1 in the state. Shortly after polls closed, several national news organizations called the election for Moore. Moore became the first African-American governor of Maryland after being sworn in on January 18, 2023.

This race was one of six Republican-held governorships up for election in 2022 in a state Joe Biden won in the 2020 presidential election, and one of three that voted for Biden by double-digits. Moore flipped six counties Hogan won in 2018, and his electoral strength largely came from densely populated Prince George's County, Montgomery County, and Baltimore City, where he improved on the margins of 2018 Democratic nominee Ben Jealous by roughly 20 percent. Moore won more than twice as many votes as Cox, with his landslide margin of victory the highest of any gubernatorial candidate in the state since William Donald Schaefer in 1986. He was the first Democrat to carry Anne Arundel, Frederick, Kent, and Talbot counties since that election as well.

== Republican primary ==
=== Campaign ===
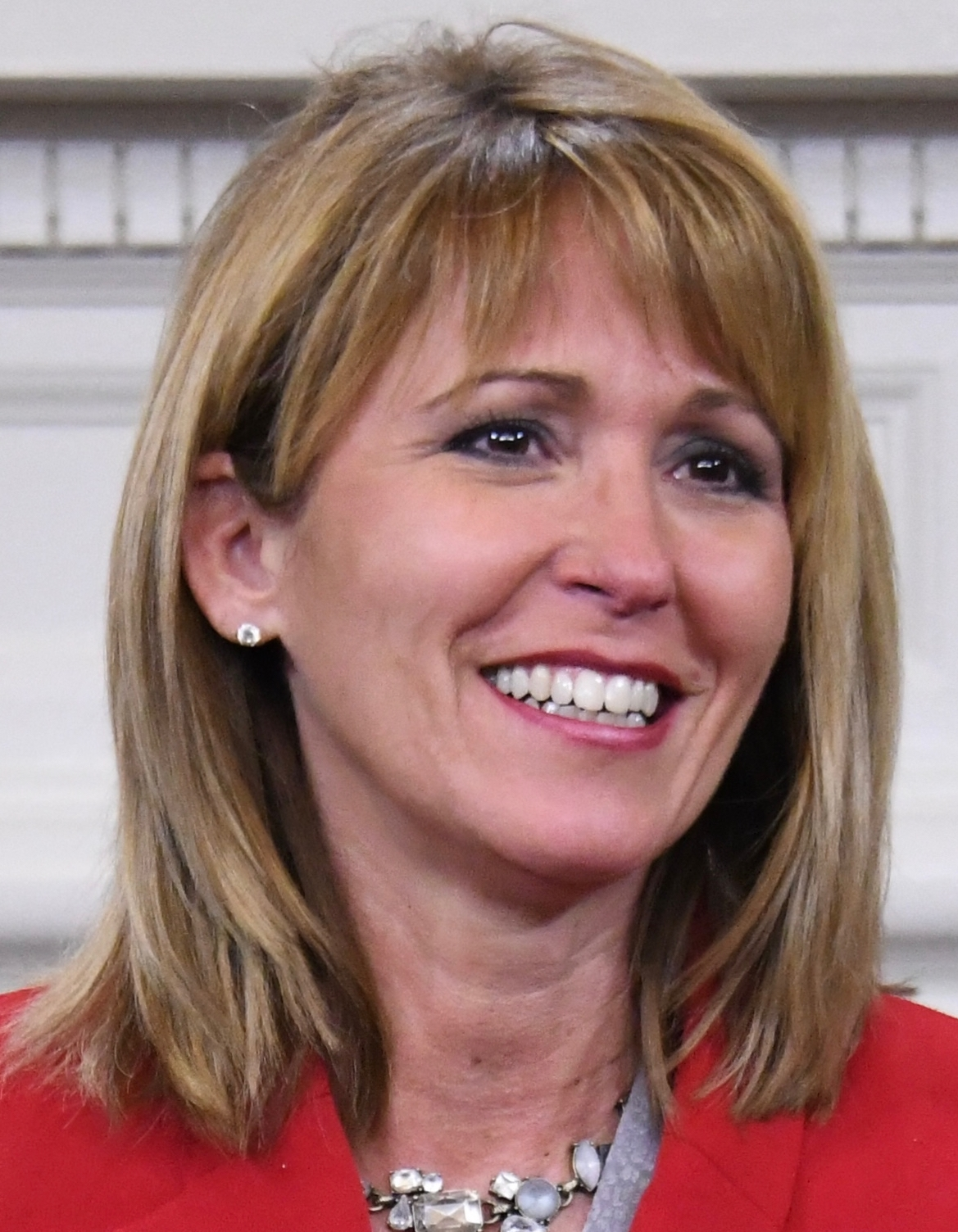
Kelly Schulz, a former official in the administration of incumbent governor Larry Hogan, finished second in the primary.

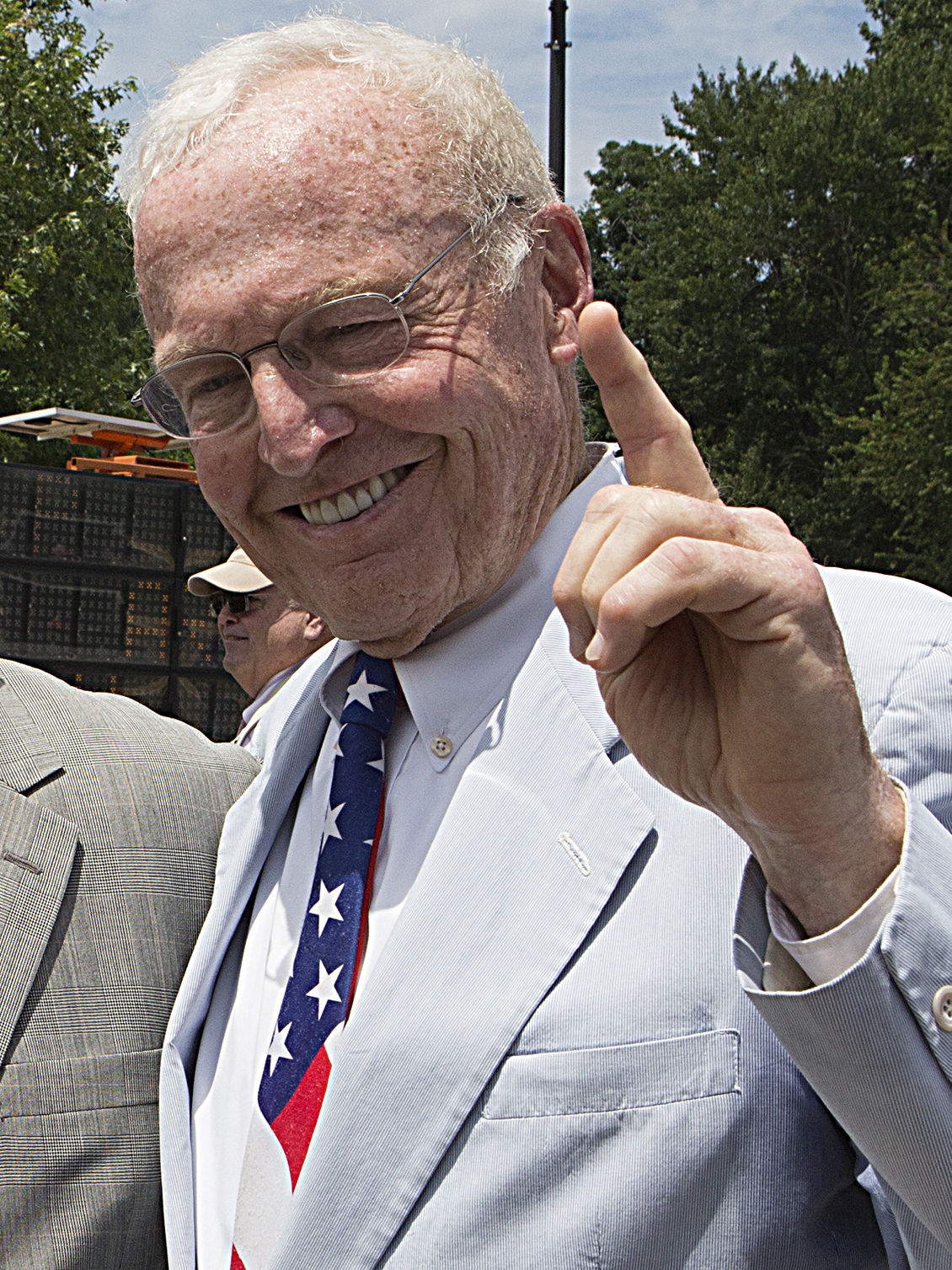
Robin Ficker, who served as a state legislator in the 1980s, finished third.

Lieutenant Governor Boyd Rutherford, who was seen as the likely Republican frontrunner in the race, announced in April 2021 that he would not seek to succeed Governor Larry Hogan. Kelly Schulz, the Hogan administration's Secretary of Commerce and former Secretary of Labor, announced her candidacy just hours after Rutherford's announcement.

State delegate Dan Cox entered the race in July 2021, and received the endorsement of former president Donald Trump in November. Hogan endorsed Schulz in the primary soon after, setting up a proxy war between Trump and Hogan in the Republican primary. Schulz outpaced Cox in fundraising and had outspent Cox 4–1, but polling showed that the two candidates were running neck-and-neck.

In June 2022, the Democratic Governors Association spent $1.2 million for a television advertisement promoting Cox, hoping he would win the nomination and be easier for Democrats to defeat in November. Schulz and Hogan accused Democrats of meddling in the Republican primary, while Cox denied receiving any support from the DGA, saying that he had "nothing to do with the ad purchase". Some observers, including strategist Jim Dornan, said that two factors — Trump's endorsement and the DGA ad blitz — allowed Cox to advance to the general election. Other observers, including former Maryland lieutenant governor and Republican National Committee chair Michael Steele, said the ads had little impact on voters, highlighting that far-right politician and neo-Confederate activist Michael Peroutka had won the attorney general primary on the same ballot by an almost identical margin to Cox, even though the DGA did not run any ads on his behalf.

=== Candidates ===
==== Nominee ====
- Dan Cox, state delegate for the fourth district (2019–2023) and nominee for MD-08 in 2016
  - Running mate: Gordana Schifanelli, attorney

==== Eliminated in primary ====
- Robin Ficker, former state delegate for district 15B (1979–1983), disbarred attorney, sports heckler and perennial candidate
  - Running mate: LeRoy Yegge, non-profit executive and bar general manager
- Kelly Schulz, former Maryland secretary of commerce (2019–2022), former Maryland secretary of labor (2015–2019) and former state delegate for district 4A (2011–2015)
  - Running mate: Jeff Woolford, former assistant secretary of the Maryland Department of Health (2021–2022)
- Joe Werner, attorney, Democratic nominee for MD-01 in 2016 and Democratic nominee for Harford County executive in 2014
  - Running mate: Minh Thanh Luong

==== Declined ====
- Barry Glassman, Harford County executive (2014–2023) (ran for comptroller)
- Andy Harris, U.S. representative for Maryland's 1st congressional district (2011–present) (ran for re-election)
- J. B. Jennings, former minority leader of the Maryland Senate (2014–2020) and state senator for the seventh district (ran for re-election, endorsed Schulz)
- Allan Kittleman, former Howard County executive (2014–2018) (ran for Howard County executive, endorsed Schulz)
- Kim Klacik, radio talk show host and nominee for Maryland's 7th congressional district in 2020 (endorsed Cox)
- Boyd Rutherford, lieutenant governor of Maryland (2015–2023) (endorsed Schulz)
- Michael Steele, former Republican National Committee chairman (2009–2011), nominee for the U.S. Senate in 2006, and former lieutenant governor of Maryland (2003–2007)

=== Endorsements ===
Dan Cox

Executive branch officials

- Michael Flynn, former U.S. National Security advisor (2017), former director of the DIA (2012–2014), and retired U.S. Army lieutenant general (Democratic)
- Donald Trump, 45th president of the United States (2017–2021)

U.S. representatives

- Andy Harris, U.S. representative for Maryland's 1st congressional district (2011–present)

State legislators

- Doug Mastriano, Pennsylvania state senator for the 33rd district (2019–present)
- Pat McDonough, former state delegate for the 7th district (2003–2019)
- Richard W. Metzgar, state delegate for the 6th district (2015–present)
- Wendy Rogers, Arizona state senator for the 6th district (2021–2023)

Individuals

- Kimberly Klacik, community activist

Organizations

- Maryland Right to Life
Kelly Schulz

State officials

- Larry Hogan, 62nd governor of Maryland (2015–2023)
- Boyd Rutherford, 9th lieutenant governor of Maryland (2015–2023)

State legislators

- 10 state senators, including minority leader Bryan Simonaire
- 16 state delegates, including minority leader Jason Buckel

Local officials

- Allan Kittleman, former Howard County executive (2014–2018)

Organizations

- Fraternal Order of Police Lodge 35
- Log Cabin Republicans of Maryland
- Maryland Realtors PAC (co-endorsement with Moore)

Newspapers

- The Baltimore Sun (Republican primary only)
- The Washington Post (Republican primary only)
Declined to endorse

State legislators

- Lauren Arikan, state delegate for the 7th district (2019–present)
- Michael Hough, state senator for the 4th district (2015–present)
- Johnny Ray Salling, state senator for the 6th district (2015–present) and nominee for Maryland's 2nd congressional district in 2020

=== Debates and forums ===
The Legislative Black Caucus of Maryland hosted the first Republican gubernatorial candidate forum on October 15, 2021. Candidates Daniel Cox and Robin Ficker attended the event, where they informed voters of color about their policies surrounding the Black Agenda. Kelly Schulz missed the event due to a prior commitment. At the end of the forum, Darryl Barnes asked all of the attending candidates to post a Black agenda to their campaign websites by November 1; none of the Republican candidates running for governor complied with this request.

The Maryland Latino Legislative Caucus of Maryland hosted the second Republican gubernatorial candidate forum on November 8, 2021. Robin Ficker was the lone Republican candidate to attend the event, where he advocated for cutting the state sales tax, starting statewide English classes, and reopening schools.

The Maryland State Bar Association hosted individual, hour-long conversations with all running candidates from December 6 to December 10, 2021. Daniel Cox, Robin Ficker, and Kelly Schulz were invited to attend the forum. Cox was unable to attend the forum on December 10, 2021, due to the General Assembly's special session.

On December 10, 2021, the Committee for Montgomery annual legislative breakfast featured a forum with Republican and Democratic candidates for governor. The forum was moderated by Ovetta Wiggins, and the only Republican candidate to attend was Robin Ficker.

On March 8 and March 9, 2022, the Maryland League of Conservation Voters collaborated with Maryland Matters, the Baltimore County NAACP, the Maryland Sierra Club, and the Chesapeake Climate Action Network to host two gubernatorial forums that focused on the topic of climate change. Robin Ficker was the only Republican candidate to attend the forums, as candidates Dan Cox and Kelly Schulz declined invitations to attend. The first forum took place at the Riggs Alumni Center at the University of Maryland at College Park and was moderated by Josh Kurtz, Tonya Harrison-Edwards, and Rona Kobell, and the second forum took place at the Ungar Athenaeum at Goucher College and was moderated by Kurtz, Staci Hartwell, Sheilah Kast, and Stella Krajick.

On March 30, 2022, Bowie State University and the Maryland Black Chamber of Commerce hosted a gubernatorial forum for candidates to share their vision and agenda on economic development in Maryland. Robin Ficker was the only Republican candidate to attend the forum, which was moderated by Micheal McGee.

On April 30, 2022, Frostburg State University, the Allegany College of Maryland, and Garrett College hosted a gubernatorial forum at Frostburg, which was attended by candidates Dan Cox and Robin Ficker. The forum was moderated by Amanda Mangan, and questions were asked by a group of students from the three hosting universities, Allegany High School, and Bishop Walsh School.

2022 Maryland Republican gubernatorial primary debates
No.	Date	Host	Moderator	Link	Participants			
P Participant A Absent N Non-invitee I Invitee W Withdrawn								
P Participant A Absent N Non-invitee I Invitee W Withdrawn					Cox	Ficker	Schulz	Werner
1	Oct 14, 2021	Legislative Black; Caucus of Maryland	Darryl Barnes	Facebook	P	P	A	N
2	Nov 8, 2021	Maryland Legislative; Latino Caucus	Patricia Villone	Facebook	A	P	A	N
3	Dec 6–10, 2021	Maryland State; Bar Association	Robert Zirkin	YouTube	A	A	P	N
4	Dec 10, 2021	Committee for Montgomery	Ovetta Wiggins	YouTube	A	P	A	N
5	Mar 8, 2022	Maryland Matters; Maryland LCV; Maryland Sierra Club; Chesapeake CAN; Ed Hatcher; Angie Cannon; Baltimore County NAACP (Note: The Baltimore County NAACP only sponsored the gubernatorial forum that took place on March 9, 2022)	Josh Kurtz; Tonya Harrison-Edwards; Rona Kobell	YouTube; Facebook	A	P	A	N
6	Mar 9, 2022	Maryland Matters; Maryland LCV; Maryland Sierra Club; Chesapeake CAN; Ed Hatcher; Angie Cannon; Baltimore County NAACP	Josh Kurtz; Sheilah Kast; Stella Krajick; Staci Hartwell	YouTube; Facebook	A	P	A	N
7	Mar 30, 2022	Bowie State University; Maryland Black; Chamber of Commerce	Micheal McGee	Facebook	A	P	A	N
8	Apr 12, 2022	Bowie, Maryland	Gary Allen; Sue Livera	YouTube	P	A	A	N
9	Apr 18, 2022	Frederick County; Conservative Club	Ryan Hedrick; Andrew Langer	YouTube	P	P	A	A
10	Apr 21, 2022	Republican Women of Carroll County	Scott Ewart	Facebook	P	P	A	N
11	Apr 30, 2022	Frostburg State University; Allegany College of Maryland; Garrett College	Amanda Mangan	Vimeo	P	P	A	N
12	May 7, 2022	Republican Women of Cecil County	Harold Philips	YouTube	P	P	A	A
13	May 31, 2022	Maryland State; Bar Association	Pamela Wood; Dick Uliano	YouTube	A	A	P	A
14	June 8, 2022	Bethesda Magazine	Anne Tallent	YouTube	P	P	P	P

=== Fundraising ===
Primary campaign finance activity through July 3, 2022
Candidate	Raised	Spent	Cash on hand
Dan Cox	$689,743	$500,473	$189,270
Robin Ficker	$1,163,807	$949,438	$208,743
Kelly Schulz	$2,633,586	$1,899,989	$733,597
Source: Maryland State Board of Elections

=== Polling ===
Poll source	Date(s) administered	Sample size (Note: Key: A – all adults RV – registered voters LV – likely voters V – unclear)	Margin of error	Daniel Cox	Robin Ficker	Kelly Schulz	Joe Werner	Other	Undecided
Goucher College	June 15–19, 2022	414 (LV)	± 4.8%	25%	2%	22%	3%	2%	45%
OpinionWorks	May 27 – June 2, 2022	428 (LV)	± 4.7%	21%	5%	27%	4%	1%	42%
Remington Research Group (R) (Note: Poll was sponsored by Cox's campaign.)	May 1–3, 2022	1,047 (LV)	± 3.0%	76%	–	13%	–	–	11%
Public Policy Polling (D) (Note: Poll was sponsored by the Democratic Governors Association.)	January 28–29, 2022	565 (LV)	± 4.1%	20%	–	12%	–	–	68%

Hypothetical polling

Poll source	Date(s) administered	Sample size	Margin of error	Boyd Rutherford	Steve Schuh	Barry Glassman	Allan Kittleman	Kelly Schulz	Other	Undecided
Change Research (D) (Note: This poll was sponsored by Our Voice Maryland.)	September 29 – October 1, 2020	– (V) (Note: Republican primary voter subsample of full sample of 650 voters)	± 7.0%	19%	5%	3%	2%	2%	—	—

=== Results ===
Results by county: Cox: 40–50%; 50–60%; 60–70%; 70–80%; Schulz: 40–50%; 50–60%

Results by precinct: Cox: 30–40%; 40–50%; 50–60%; 60–70%; 70–80%; 80–90%; 90–100%; Schulz: 30–40%; 40–50%; 50–60%; 60–70%; 70–80%; 80–90%; 90–100%; Tie No data/No votes

Republican primary results
Party	Candidate	Votes	%
Republican	Dan Cox; Gordana Schifanelli	153,423	52.00%
Republican	Kelly Schulz; Jeff Woolford	128,302	43.48%
Republican	Robin Ficker; LeRoy F. Yegge Jr.	8,268	2.80%
Republican	Joe Werner; Minh Thanh Luong	5,075	1.72%
Total votes		295,068	100.0%

== Democratic primary ==
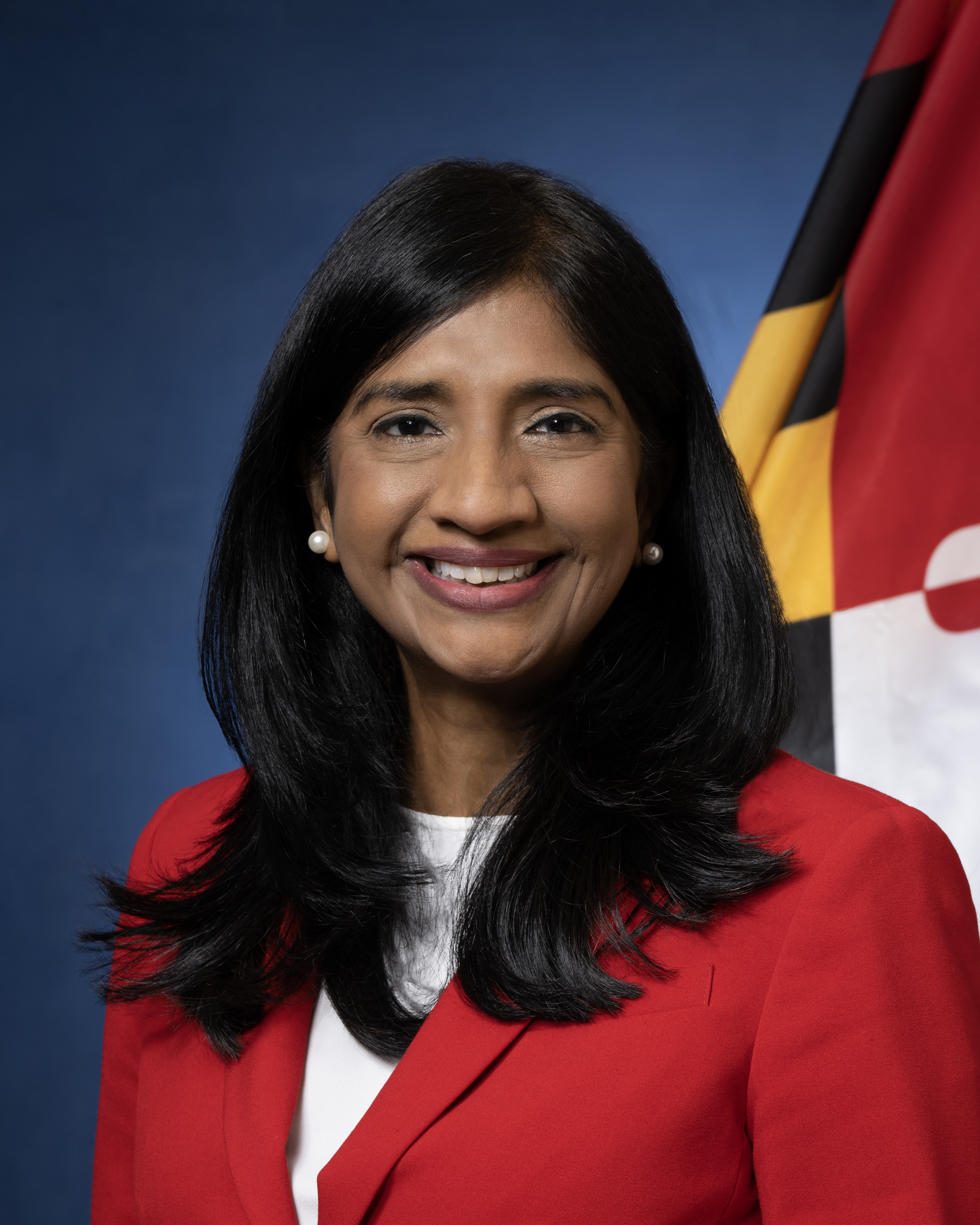
Former state delegate Aruna Miller was nominated for lieutenant governor.

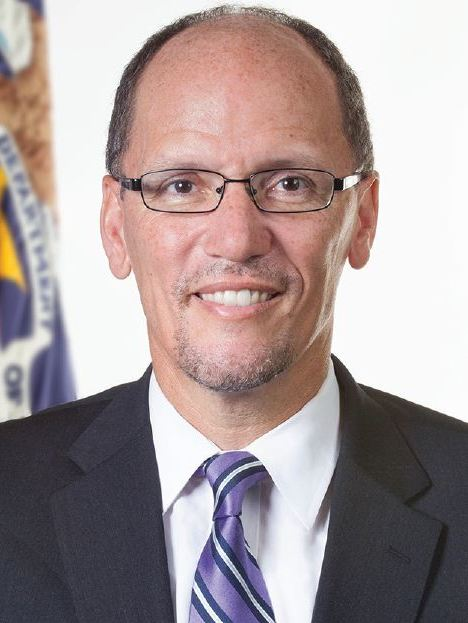
Former U.S. Labor Secretary and DNC Chair Tom Perez finished second in the primary.

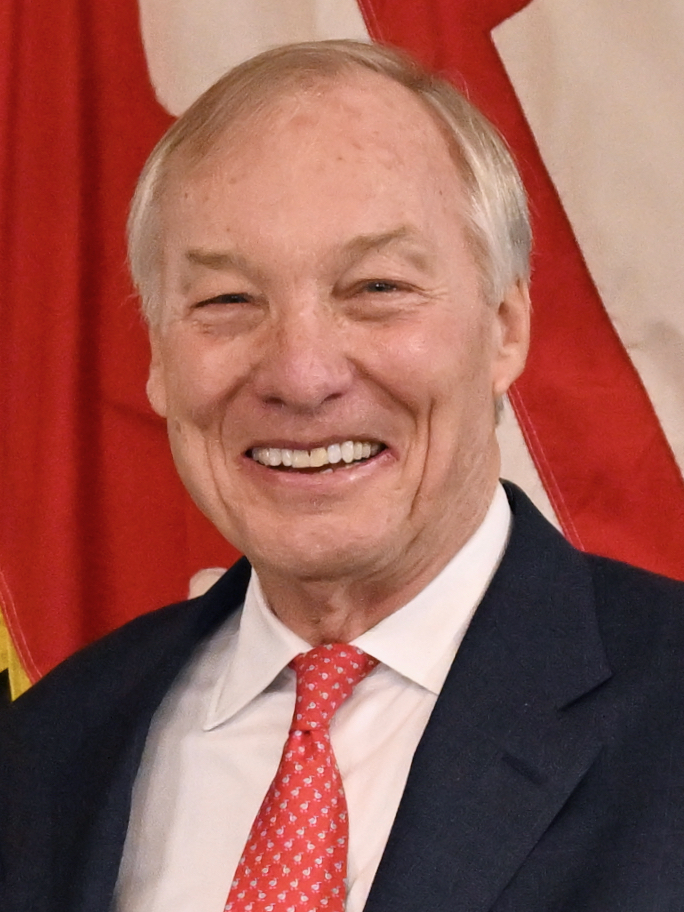
Maryland Comptroller Peter Franchot finished third.

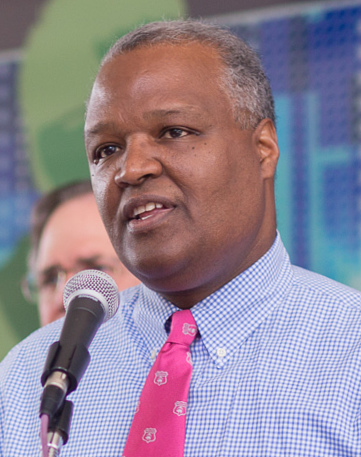
Despite dropping out of the race, former Prince George's County Executive Rushern Baker finished fourth.

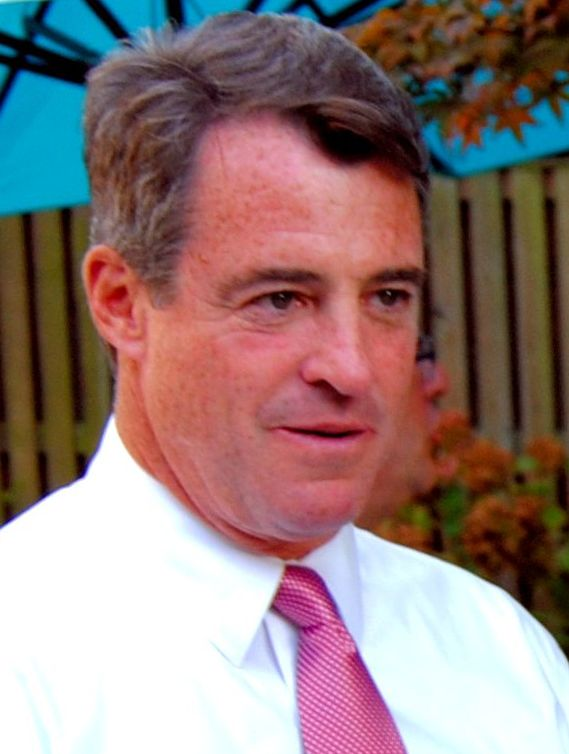
Former Maryland Attorney General Doug Gansler finished fifth.

=== Campaign ===
The first two major Democratic candidates to announce were state Comptroller Peter Franchot and former Prince George's County executive Rushern Baker. Both Franchot and Baker were seen as the leading candidates in the race, but early polling showed that more than 40 percent of likely voters were still undecided. With high name recognition and a big war-chest built up over years without primary challengers as comptroller, Franchot entered the race as the nominal frontrunner.

As the campaign progressed, more candidates began entering the race, with Franchot holding onto a solid lead in polling as the race expanded to a four-way battle between Franchot, Baker, author and former Robin Hood Foundation CEO Wes Moore, and former Democratic National Committee chairman Tom Perez. On June 10, 2022, Baker suspended his campaign for governor, his campaign having suffered from financial challenges and decreasing party support, creating an opening in voter-rich Prince George's County. Polling conducted later that month by Goucher College showed Franchot, Moore, and Perez in a statistical tie, with each of the three frontrunners having enough resources and endorsements to compete for undecided voters.

In addition to Franchot, Baker, Moore, and Perez, six other candidates also ran for the Democratic nomination, including former nonprofit executive Jon Baron, former Maryland attorney general Doug Gansler, perennial candidate Ralph Jaffe, former Obama administration official Ashwani Jain, former Secretary of Education John King Jr., and former Bread and Roses Party founder Jerome Segal. Two other candidates, former Republican Anne Arundel County executive Laura Neuman and tech company founder Mike Rosenbaum, also declared their candidacy but had dropped out before the primaries.

Moore won the Democratic primary on July 19, 2022, beating out Perez and Franchot with 32.4 percent of the vote and by a margin of 15,349 votes in Maryland's closest Democratic gubernatorial primary since 1966.

=== Candidates ===
==== Nominee ====
- Wes Moore, author and former CEO of the Robin Hood Foundation
  - Running mate: Aruna Miller, former state delegate for the 15th district (2010–2019) and candidate for MD-06 in 2018

==== Eliminated in primary ====
- Jon Baron, former nonprofit executive, expert in evidence-based policy, and former federal official
  - Running mate: Natalie Williams, former TV producer and communications professional
- Peter Franchot, comptroller of Maryland (2007–2023) and nominee for MD-08 in 1988
  - Running mate: Monique Anderson-Walker, former Prince George's County councilmember (2018–2021)
- Doug Gansler, former attorney general of Maryland (2007–2015) and candidate for governor in 2014
  - Running mate: Candace Hollingsworth, former mayor of Hyattsville (2015–2020)
- Ralph Jaffe, perennial candidate
  - Running mate: Mark Greben
- Ashwani Jain, former Obama administration official
  - Running mate: LaTrece Hawkins Lytes, community activist
- John King Jr., former United States secretary of education (2016–2017)
  - Running mate: Michelle Siri, executive director of the Women's Law Center of Maryland
- Tom Perez, former Democratic National Committee chairman (2017–2021), former United States secretary of labor (2013–2017), and former Maryland secretary of labor (2007–2009)
  - Running mate: Shannon Sneed, former Baltimore City councilmember (2016–2020)
- Jerome Segal, founder of the Bread and Roses Party (2018–2021), candidate for president of the United States in 2020, and Democratic candidate for U.S. Senate in 2018
  - Running mate: Justinian M. Dispenza, Galena town councilmember (2021–present)

==== Withdrawn ====
- Rushern Baker, former Prince George's County executive (2010–2018) and candidate for governor in 2018
  - Running mate: Nancy Navarro, Montgomery County councilmember (2009–2022)
- Laura Neuman, former Republican Anne Arundel County executive (2013–2014) (endorsed Franchot)
- Mike Rosenbaum, founder of Catalyte

==== Declined ====
- Angela Alsobrooks, Prince George's County executive (2018–present) and former Prince George's County state attorney (2011–2018) (ran for re-election, endorsed Moore)
- Calvin Ball III, Howard County executive (2018–present) (ran for re-election)
- Anthony Brown, U.S. representative for Maryland's 4th congressional district (2017–2023), former lieutenant governor and nominee for governor in 2014 (ran for attorney general)
- Brooke Lierman, state delegate for the 46th district (2015–2023) (ran for comptroller)
- Kweisi Mfume, U.S. representative for Maryland's 7th congressional district (2020–present) and former president of the NAACP (1996–2004) (running for re-election, endorsed Moore)
- Heather Mizeur, former state delegate for the 20th district (2007–2015) and candidate for governor in 2014 (ran for MD-01)
- Johnny Olszewski, Baltimore County executive (2018–present) and former state delegate for the 6th district (2006–2015) (ran for re-election, endorsed Perez)
- Steuart Pittman, Anne Arundel County executive (2018–present) (running for re-election, endorsed Moore)
- John Sarbanes, U.S. representative for Maryland's 3rd congressional district (2007–present) (ran for re-election)
- David Trone, U.S. representative for Maryland's 6th congressional district (2019–present) (ran for re-election)
- Mary L. Washington, state senator for the 43rd district (2019–present) (ran for re-election)

=== Endorsements ===
Peter Franchot

U.S. senators

- Ed Markey, U.S. senator from Massachusetts (2013–present)

U.S. representatives

- Roy Dyson, former U.S. representative for MD-01 (1981–1991)
- Wayne Gilchrest, former U.S. representative for MD-01 (1991–2009)

State officials

- Gloria Lawlah, former Maryland secretary of Aging (2007–2015)
- Melvin Steinberg, former lieutenant governor of Maryland (1987–1995)
- Robert L. Swann, former comptroller of Maryland (1998–1999)

State legislators

- 11 state senators, including majority leader Nancy King
- 30 state delegates

Local officials

- Jacob Day, mayor of Salisbury (2015–present)
- Doug Duncan, former Montgomery County executive (1994–2006)
- Andrew Friedson, Montgomery County councilperson (2018–present)
- Victoria Jackson-Stanley, former mayor of Cambridge (2008–2021)
- Carl Stokes, former Baltimore city councilor (2010–2016)

Labor unions

- International Longshoremen's Association Local 333
- International Union of Operating Engineers Local 77
- Laborers' Union Mid-Atlantic Region and 7 locals (Note: Baltimore-Washington Laborers District Council, West Virginia and Appalachian Laborers' District Council, and locals 11, 202R, 572, 616, and 710)
- Teamsters Joint Council 55, IBT
- UNITE HERE Locals 7 and 23
Doug Gansler

State officials

- 41 state attorneys general

State legislators

- Jon Cardin, state delegate for the 11th district (2019–present)
- Art Helton, former state senator for the 6th district (1975–1983)
- Ronald Young, state senator for the 3rd district (2011–present)

Organizations

- Baltimore County Fraternal Order of Police Lodge #4
John King Jr.

U.S. senators

- Chris Murphy, U.S. senator from Connecticut (2013–present)

State legislators

- Alice Cain, former state delegate for district 30A (2019–2020)
- Lorig Charkoudian, state delegate for the 20th district (2019–present)

Organizations

- Maryland National Organization for Women PAC
- National Iranian American Action Council PAC
- Our Revolution Maryland
- Sierra Club Maryland
- Sunrise Movement Maryland
Wes Moore

U.S. representatives

- Steny Hoyer, House majority leader (2007–2011, 2019–2023) from MD-05 (1981–present)
- Kweisi Mfume, U.S. representative for MD-07 (2020–present)
- Dutch Ruppersberger, U.S. representative for MD-02 (2003–present)
- Albert Wynn, former U.S. representative for MD-04 (1993–2008)

State officials

- Parris Glendening, 59th governor of Maryland (1995–2003)
- Peta Richkus, former Maryland secretary of general services (1999–2003)
- John Willis, former Maryland secretary of state (1995–2003)

State legislators

- 14 state senators, including senate president Bill Ferguson
- 36 state delegates, including speaker Adrienne Jones

Local officials

- Angela Alsobrooks, Prince George's County executive (2018–present)
- Aisha Braveboy, Prince George's County state attorney (2018–present)
- Mark Conway, Baltimore city councilor (2020–present)
- Will Jawando, Montgomery County councilor (2018–present)
- Don Mohler, former Baltimore County executive (2018)
- Steuart Pittman, Anne Arundel County executive (2018–present)
- James T. Smith Jr., former Baltimore County executive (2002–2010)
- Bernard "Jack" Young, former mayor of Baltimore (2019–2020)

Party officials

- Susan Turnbull, former chair of the Maryland Democratic Party (2009–2011)

Individuals

- Ben Jealous, president of People for the American Way (2020–present)
- Oprah Winfrey, TV host (Independent)

Labor unions

- International Association of Fire Fighters Local 964
- Ironworkers Local 5

Organizations

- 314 Action
- Maryland League of Conservation Voters
- Maryland Realtors PAC (co-endorsement with Schulz)
- Maryland State Education Association
- VoteVets.org

Newspapers

- Baltimore Afro-American (Democratic primary only)
- Latin Opinion (Democratic primary only)
Tom Perez

U.S. senators

- Ben Ray Luján, U.S. senator from New Mexico (2021–present)
- Alex Padilla, U.S. senator from California (2021–present)

U.S. representatives

- Michael Barnes, former U.S. representative for MD-08 (1979–1987)
- Nancy Pelosi, speaker of the House (2019–present) from CA-12 (1987–present)
- 7 other U.S. representatives

State officials

- Keith Ellison, attorney general of Minnesota (2019–present)

State legislators

- Joanne Benson, state senator for the 24th district (2011–present)
- Benjamin Kramer, state senator for the 19th district (2019–present)
- Cory McCray, state senator for the 45th district (2019–present)
- 17 state delegates

Local officials

- Gabe Albornoz, Montgomery County councilor (2018–present)
- Mary Pat Clarke, former Baltimore city councilor (2003–2020)
- Marc Elrich, Montgomery County executive (2018–present)
- Nancy Floreen, former Montgomery County councilor (2002–2018) (Independent)
- Evan Glass, Montgomery County councilor (2018–present)
- Ike Leggett, former Montgomery County executive (2006–2018)
- Johnny Olszewski, Baltimore County executive (2018–present)
- Jimmy Tarlau, Mount Rainier city councilor (2021–present)

Party officials

- Kathleen Matthews, former chair of the Maryland Democratic Party (2017–2018)

Labor unions

- 3 AFSCME councils (Note: Councils 3, 67, and 2250)
- Amalgamated Transit Union (Note: International and locals 689 and 1300)
- American Federation of Teachers Maryland
- Bricklayers and Allied Craftworkers Local 1
- 8 Communications Workers of America locals (Note: Maryland/DC State Council and locals 2100, 2105, 2106, 2107, 2108, and 2336)
- 3 International Brotherhood of Electrical Workers locals (Note: Locals 24, 70, and 410)
- Maryland State and District of Columbia AFL–CIO
- 3 Service Employees International Union locals (Note: Locals 32BJ 500, and 1199)
- 3 UFCW locals (Note: Locals 27, 400, and MCGEO 1994)
- United Association

Organizations

- Bikemore
- CASA in Action
- Congressional Hispanic Caucus
- Latino Victory Fund

Newspapers

- The Baltimore Sun (Democratic primary only)
- El Tiempo Latino (Democratic primary only)
- The Washington Post (Democratic primary only)
Rushern Baker (withdrawn)

State legislators

- ~~Talmadge Branch, state delegate for the 45th district (1995–present)~~ (switched endorsement to Moore after Baker withdrew)

Local officials

- Glenn Ivey, former Prince George's County state's attorney (2002–2011)
- Jolene Ivey, Prince George's County councilperson (2018–present) and candidate for lieutenant governor in 2014
- ~~Bernard "Jack" Young, former mayor of Baltimore (2019–2020)~~ (switched endorsement to Moore after Baker withdrew)
Declined to endorse

U.S. senators

- Ben Cardin, U.S. senator from Maryland (2007–present)
- Chris Van Hollen, U.S. senator from Maryland (2017–present)

Local officials

- Brandon Scott, mayor of Baltimore (2020–present)

=== Debates and forums ===
The Montgomery County Renters Alliance hosted the first Democratic gubernatorial primary forum on September 21, 2021. Candidates who attended included Peter Franchot, Doug Gansler, Ashwani Jain, John King Jr., Wes Moore, and Tom Perez. Rushern Baker was also due to attend, but withdrew following the death of his wife, Christa Beverly Baker, on September 18, 2021. Jon Baron, who, along with Mike Rosenbaum, was not invited to the forum, attended a town hall hosted by the Renters Alliance on September 29, 2021.

A second gubernatorial candidate forum was hosted on October 7, 2021, by the Anne Arundel County Democratic Party. Candidates Rushern Baker, Jon Baron, Peter Franchot, Ashwani Jain, John King Jr., and Mike Rosenbaum all attended the forum, where they discussed their stances on education, criminal reform, healthcare, and economic reform policy. Tom Perez was also invited, but could not attend because of a schedule conflict.

The third gubernatorial candidate forum was hosted by the Legislative Black Caucus of Maryland on October 14, 2021. All nine declared Democratic candidates attended the forum, where they informed voters of color about their policies surrounding the Black Agenda. At the end of the forum, Darryl Barnes asked all of the attending candidates to post a Black agenda on their websites by November 1; candidates Peter Franchot, Wes Moore, John King Jr., Tom Perez, Jon Baron, Doug Gansler, and Mike Rosenbaum complied with Barnes' request, with Franchot being the first candidate to present a cohesive plan. Ashwani Jain did not release a specific Black agenda, saying that part of his campaign platform already includes a Black agenda. Rushern Baker said at the reception that he would also produce a plan in the following weeks, but added that one was unnecessary because of previous elected Black leaders' plans. Baker would end up posting his Black agenda on November 4, three days after Barnes' deadline.

The fourth gubernatorial candidate forum was hosted by the Climate X-Change Maryland and the Rebuild Maryland Coalition in partnership with the Chesapeake Climate Action Network on November 1, 2021. Candidates Jon Baron, Doug Gansler, John King Jr., Ashwani Jain, Tom Perez, and Mike Rosenbaum attended the forum, where they informed voters about the policies they would enact to fight climate change and reduce greenhouse gas emissions. Candidates Rushern Baker, Peter Franchot, and Wes Moore were also invited, but did not attend the forum.

The fifth gubernatorial candidate forum was hosted by the Prince George's County NAACP on November 4, 2021, with Jon Baron, Doug Gansler, and Tom Perez, and on November 8, 2021, with Wes Moore, Mike Rosenbaum, Rushern Baker, and Ashwani Jain. Peter Franchot was due to attend the first forum, but could not attend due to technical difficulties. Several topics, including police brutality, environmental injustice, and transparency among state agencies, were discussed at the forums. John King Jr. did not participate in this forum because he teaches an undergraduate course on education policy at the University of Maryland in College Park.

The sixth gubernatorial candidate forum was hosted by the Maryland Latino Legislative Caucus on November 8, 2021. Candidates Jon Baron, Peter Franchot, Doug Gansler, John King Jr., and Tom Perez attended the forum where they answered questions about expanding healthcare access, economic opportunities, education, and cabinet diversity.

The seventh gubernatorial candidate forum was hosted by the St. Ignatius Justice and Peace Committee at the St. Ignatius Church on November 16, 2021. All candidates who received more than 1% support in available opinion polls were invited to the forum. Candidates Rushern Baker, Peter Franchot, Doug Gansler, John King Jr., Wes Moore, Tom Perez, and Mike Rosenbaum confirmed their availability for the conversation, but only Gansler, Moore, Perez, and Rosenbaum attended. Attending candidates answered questions about cleaning the Chesapeake Bay, tackling climate change, homelessness, poverty, white supremacy, immigration, the defund the police movement, critical race theory, abortion, and death with dignity.

The eighth gubernatorial candidate forum was hosted by the Maryland Democratic Party on November 22, 2021. All Democratic candidates were invited to attend the forum, where they discussed economic issues, such as the state's $2.5 billion budget surplus, inflation, vaccine and mask mandates, and unions. Candidates Rushern Baker, Jon Baron, Doug Gansler, Ashwani Jain, John King, Wes Moore, and Tom Perez attended the forum.

The Maryland State Bar Association hosted individual, hour-long conversations with all running candidates from December 6 to December 10, 2021. All Democratic candidates attended the forum. Mike Rosenbaum intended on attending the forum on December 7, but withdrew from the debate after suspending his campaign on November 30, 2021.

On December 10, 2021, the Committee for Montgomery annual legislative breakfast featured a forum with Republican and Democratic candidates for governor. Candidates Rushern Baker, Jon Baron, Doug Gansler, Ashwani Jain, John King Jr., Wes Moore, and Tom Perez attended the forum, which was moderated by Ovetta Wiggins. Peter Franchot did not attend the forum because of a commitment he made several months prior to the debate to attend a minority business event in Anne Arundel County.

On January 5, 2022, the Maryland Democratic Party hosted a gubernatorial candidate forum that focused on the topic of education. Candidates Rushern Baker, Jon Baron, Doug Gansler, Ashwani Jain, John King Jr., Wes Moore, and Tom Perez attended the event, which was moderated by Maryland Matters editor Danielle Gaines. Peter Franchot did not attend the forum because he attended a campaign fundraiser in Cecil County.

On January 26, 2022, the Maryland State Education Association hosted a gubernatorial forum that focused on the topic of education. All candidates who said that they would pursue the group's endorsement were invited to the event, which was moderated by Cheryl Bost, the group's president. Jerome Segal was the only candidate not to attend the forum.

On March 8 and March 9, 2022, the Maryland League of Conservation Voters collaborated with Maryland Matters, the Baltimore County NAACP, the Maryland Sierra Club, and the Chesapeake Climate Action Network to host two gubernatorial forums that focused on the topic of climate change. Candidates Jon Baron, Doug Gansler, Ashwani Jain, John King, Laura Neuman and Jerome Segal attended both forums, while Wes Moore and Tom Perez only attended the first event. Peter Franchot initially intended on attending the second forum, but withdrew due to an "unexpected personal matter". Rushern Baker initially confirmed he would attend both events, but later withdrew from both. The first forum took place at the Riggs Alumni Center at the University of Maryland at College Park and was moderated by Josh Kurtz, Tonya Harrison-Edwards, and Rona Kobell, and the second forum took place at the Ungar Athenaeum at Goucher College and was moderated by Kurtz, Sheilah Kast, and Stella Krajick.

On March 15, 2022, the Maryland Democratic Party hosted its second Burgers & Brews Gubernatorial Candidate Forum in Frederick, Maryland. Candidates Jon Baron, Doug Gansler, Ashwani Jain, John King Jr., Laura Neuman, and Jerome Segal attended the event, which was moderated by Maryland Matters editor Danielle Gaines.

On March 30, 2022, Bowie State University and the Maryland Black Chamber of Commerce hosted a gubernatorial forum for candidates to share their vision and agenda on economic development in Maryland. Candidates Jon Baron, Rushern Baker, Peter Franchot, Doug Gansler, Ashwani Jain, John King Jr., Wes Moore, and Tom Perez attended the forum, which was moderated by Micheal McGee.

On April 3, 2022, the Eleanor and Franklin Roosevelt Democratic Club hosted a gubernatorial forum in Greenbelt, Maryland, which was moderated by Dave Zahren and attended by candidates Jon Baron, Doug Gansler, Ashwani Jain, Tom Perez, and Jerome Segal.

On April 20, 2022, Bikemore and The Real News Network hosted a gubernatorial forum focused on the topic of transportation. Candidates who received more than 10 percent in recent polling and completed a written questionnaire prior to the event were invited to attend. Candidates Rushern Baker, John King Jr., Peter Franchot, and Tom Perez participated in the forum, while Wes Moore opted out of the debate.

On April 26, 2022, Coppin State University hosted a gubernatorial forum focused on the topics of economic development, crime, and education. Candidates Rushern Baker, Jon Baron, Peter Franchot, Doug Gansler, Wes Moore, Tom Perez, and Jerome Segal attended the forum, which was moderated by WMAR-TV news anchor Kelly Swoope.

On April 30, 2022, Frostburg State University, the Allegany College of Maryland, and Garrett College hosted a gubernatorial forum at Frostburg, which was attended by candidates Rushern Baker, Ashwani Jain, and John King Jr. The forum was moderated by Amanda Mangan, and questions were asked by a group of students from the three hosting universities, Allegany High School, and Bishop Walsh School.

2022 Maryland Democratic gubernatorial primary debates
No.	Date	Host	Moderator	Link	Participants											
P Participant A Absent N Non-invitee I Invitee W Withdrawn O Not yet entered race																
P Participant A Absent N Non-invitee I Invitee W Withdrawn O Not yet entered race					Baker	Baron	Franchot	Gansler	Jaffe	Jain	King	Moore	Neuman	Perez	Rosenbaum	Segal
1	Sep 21, 2021	Montgomery County; Renters Alliance	Josh Kurtz; Pamela Wood; Kyle Swenson	YouTube	A	N	P	P	O	P	P	P	O	P	N	O
2	Oct 7, 2021	Anne Arundel County; Democratic Party	Antonio Palmer; Jenese Jones Oden	Facebook	P	P	P	A	O	P	P	A	O	A	P	O
3	Oct 14, 2021	Legislative Black; Caucus of Maryland	Darryl Barnes	Facebook	P	P	P	P	O	P	P	P	O	P	P	O
4	Nov 1, 2021	Climate X-Change MD; Rebuild MD Coalition; Chesapeake CAN	Brooke Harper	Vimeo	A	P	A	P	O	P	P	A	O	P	P	O
5	Nov 4, 2021; Nov 8, 2021	Prince George's; County NAACP	Ebony McMorris	YouTube I YouTube II	P	P	A	P	O	P	A	P	O	P	P	O
6	Nov 8, 2021	Maryland Legislative; Latino Caucus	Patricia Villone	Facebook	A	P	P	P	O	A	P	A	O	P	A	O
7	Nov 16, 2021	St. Ignatius Justice; Peace Committee	Kate Walsh; Glendora Hughes	YouTube	A	N	A	P	O	N	A	P	O	P	P	O
8	Nov 22, 2021	Maryland; Democratic Party	Tracee Wilkins	Facebook	P	P	A	P	O	P	P	P	O	P	A	O
9	Dec 6–10, 2021	Maryland State; Bar Association	Robert Zirkin	YouTube	P	P	P	P	O	P	P	P	O	P	W	O
10	Dec 10, 2021	Committee for Montgomery	Ovetta Wiggins	YouTube	P	P	A	P	O	P	P	P	O	P	W	O
11	Dec 10, 2021	Our Black Party	Candace; Hollingsworth	YouTube	P	P	A	P	O	P	P	A	O	P	W	O
12	Jan 5, 2022	Maryland; Democratic Party	Danielle Gaines	Facebook	P	P	A	P	O	P	P	P	O	P	W	N
13	Jan 26, 2022	Maryland State; Education Association	Cheryl Bost	Facebook	P	P	P	P	O	P	P	P	P	P	W	A
14	Mar 8, 2022	Maryland Matters; Maryland LCV; Maryland Sierra Club; Chesapeake CAN; Ed Hatcher; Angie Cannon; Baltimore County NAACP	Josh Kurtz; Tonya Harrison-Edwards; Rona Kobell	YouTube; Facebook	A	P	A	P	O	P	P	P	P	P	W	P
15	Mar 9, 2022	Maryland Matters; Maryland LCV; Maryland Sierra Club; Chesapeake CAN; Ed Hatcher; Angie Cannon; Baltimore County NAACP	Josh Kurtz; Sheilah Kast; Stella Krajick; Staci Hartwell	YouTube; Facebook	A	P	A	P	O	P	P	A	P	A	W	P
16	Mar 15, 2022	Maryland; Democratic Party	Danielle Gaines	Facebook	A	P	A	P	O	P	P	A	P	A	W	P
17	Mar 30, 2022	Bowie State University; Maryland Black; Chamber of Commerce	Micheal McGee	Facebook	P	P	P	P	O	P	P	P	A	P	W	A
18	Apr 3, 2022	Eleanor and Franklin; Roosevelt Democratic Club	Dave Zahren	YouTube	A	P	A	P	O	P	A	A	A	P	W	P
19	Apr 12, 2022	Bowie, Maryland	Gary Allen; Sue Livera	YouTube	A	P	A	P	O	A	A	A	A	A	W	P
20	Apr 14, 2022	Maryland; Democratic Party	Kimi Yoshino	Facebook	A	P	A	P	O	P	A	A	W	A	W	P
21	Apr 20, 2022	Bikemore; The Real News Network	Jaisal Noor	Facebook; YouTube	P	N	P	N	N	N	P	A	W	P	W	N
22	Apr 26, 2022	Coppin State University	Kelly Swoope	YouTube; Facebook	P	P	P	P	N	N	N	P	W	P	W	P
23	Apr 30, 2022	Our Revolution Maryland	Chrissy Holt	YouTube	P	A	P	A	N	P	P	A	W	P	W	A
24	Apr 30, 2022	Frostburg State University; Allegany College of Maryland; Garrett College	Amanda Mangan	Vimeo	P	A	A	A	N	P	P	A	W	A	W	A
25	May 31, 2022	Maryland; Democratic Party	Pamela Wood	Facebook	P	P	A	P	N	P	P	P	W	P	W	P
26	June 1, 2022	Maryland State; Bar Association	Pamela Wood; Dick Uliano	YouTube	P	P	A	P	N	A	P	A	W	A	W	P
27	June 2, 2022	Leisure World Democratic Club	Danielle Gaines	N/A	P	N	P	P	N	N	P	P	W	P	W	N
28	June 6, 2022	Maryland Public Television; WBAL-TV	Jeff Salkin	YouTube	P	P	P	P	N	P	P	P	W	P	W	N
29	June 8, 2022	Bethesda Magazine	Anne Tallent	YouTube	A	P	A	P	P	P	P	P	W	P	W	P
30	July 1, 2022	WYPR	Tom Hall	Radio	W	N	A	N	N	N	N	P	W	P	W	N

=== Fundraising ===
Primary campaign finance activity through July 3, 2022
Candidate	Raised	Spent	Cash on hand
Rushern Baker	$1,115,659	$1,107,375	$8,039
Jon Baron	$2,338,134	$2,026,351	$311,784
Peter Franchot	$3,242,746	$8,359,508	$632,402
Doug Gansler	$1,663,991	$1,542,344	$549,889
Ralph Jaffe	<$1,000	<$1,000	N/A
Ashwani Jain	$148,306	$130,307	$17,999
John King Jr.	$3,272,439	$3,863,757	$208,917
Wes Moore	$7,878,705	$7,097,775	$780,930
Laura Neuman	$131,679	$128,795	$2,884
Tom Perez	$4,404,379	$3,852,255	$644,900
Mike Rosenbaum	$1,749,682	$1,749,682	$0
Jerome Segal	$42,808	$37,930	$4,878
Source: Maryland State Board of Elections

=== Polling ===
Graphical summary

Poll source	Date(s) administered	Sample size	Margin of error	Rushern Baker	Peter Franchot	Doug Gansler	John King Jr.	Wes Moore	Tom Perez	Other	Undecided
20/20 Insight, LLC (D) (Note: This poll was sponsored by John King's campaign.)	June 28–30, 2022	410 (LV)	± 4.8%	–	15%	4%	17%	18%	22%	2% (Note: Baron with 2%)	23%
Garin-Hart-Yang Research Group (D) (Note: This poll was sponsored by Wes Moore's campaign.)	June 25–27, 2022	601 (LV)	± 4.1%	–	21%	4%	5%	20%	16%	1% (Note: Baron with 1%)	33%
Goucher College	June 15–19, 2022	403 (LV)	± 4.9%	–	16%	5%	4%	14%	14%	9% (Note: "Some other candidate" (volunteered response) with 5%; Baron and Jain with 2%; Jaffe and Segal with <1%)	37%
	June 10, 2022	Baker suspends his campaign									
Garin-Hart-Yang Research Group (D)	June 6–9, 2022	601 (LV)	± 4.1%	8%	22%	3%	4%	13%	13%	1% (Note: Baron with 1%)	36%
OpinionWorks	May 27 – June 2, 2022	562 (LV)	± 4.1%	7%	20%	4%	4%	15%	12%	8% (Note: "Someone else" with 3%; Jain with 2%; Baron, Segal, and Jaffe with 1%)	31%
20/20 Insight, LLC (D)	May 19–22, 2022	430 (LV)	± 4.7%	5%	17%	6%	16%	16%	12%	–	27%
Garin-Hart-Yang Research Group (D)	May 5–9, 2022	601 (LV)	± 4.1%	11%	19%	3%	4%	13%	6%	–	42%
Change Research (D) (Note: This poll was sponsored by For The People MD, a PAC supporting John King.)	April 2–5, 2022	886 (LV)	± 3.7%	10%	20%	5%	3%	13%	7%	–	40%
GQR Research (D) (Note: This poll was sponsored by Rushern Baker's campaign.)	March 8–14, 2022	807 (LV)	± 3.5%	15%	23%	5%	3%	10%	11%	8%	25%
Tidemore Public Affairs (D) (Note: This poll was sponsored by Peter Franchot's campaign.)	January 6–10, 2022	580 (LV)	± 4.0%	16%	23%	7%	6%	12%	10%	1%	24%
	November 30, 2021	Rosenbaum withdraws from the race									
GQR Research (D)	November 2021	– (LV)	–	15%	25%	–	–	7%	9%	–	–
Garin-Hart-Yang Research Group (D)	August 30 – September 2, 2021	500 (LV)	± 4.5%	12%	17%	4%	1%	7%	6%	2% (Note: Rosenbaum with 2%)	52%
Gonzales Research (D) (Note: This poll was sponsored by Douglas J. J. Peters.)	May 17–22, 2021	301 (LV)	± 5.8%	22%	18%	4%	1%	2%	10%	2% (Note: Baron and Rosenbaum with 1%; Jain with 0%)	41%

Hypothetical polling

Poll source	Date(s) administered	Sample size	Margin of error	Angela Alsobrooks	Anthony Brown	Peter Franchot	Ben Jealous	John King Jr.	Tom Perez	Steuart Pittman	Johnny Olszewski Jr.	David Trone	Undecided
Change Research (D)	September 29 – October 1, 2020	– (V) (Note: Democratic primary voter subsample of full sample of 650 voters)	± 5.0%	13%	10%	9%	15%	2%	3%	2%	5%	6%	28%

=== Results ===
Results by county: Moore: 20–30%; 30–40%; 40–50%; Perez: 20–30%; 30–40%; 40–50%; Franchot: 30–40%; 40–50%

Results by precinct: Moore: 20–30%; 30–40%; 40–50%; 50–60%; 60–70%; 70–80%; 90–100%; Perez: 20–30%; 30–40%; 40–50%; 50–60%; 60–70%; 80–90%; 90–100%; Franchot: 20–30%; 30–40%; 40–50%; 50–60%; 60–70%; 70–80%; 80–90%; >90%; Baker: 90–100%; Gansler: 60–70%; King: 50–60%; Baron: 50–60%; Tie No data/No votes

Democratic primary results
Party	Candidate	Votes	%
Democratic	Wes Moore; Aruna Miller	217,524	32.41%
Democratic	Tom Perez; Shannon Sneed	202,175	30.12%
Democratic	Peter Franchot; Monique Anderson-Walker	141,586	21.10%
Democratic	Rushern Baker (withdrawn); Nancy Navarro (withdrawn)	26,594	3.96%
Democratic	Doug Gansler; Candace Hollingsworth	25,481	3.80%
Democratic	John King Jr.; Michelle Siri	24,882	3.71%
Democratic	Ashwani Jain; LaTrece Hawkins Lytes	13,784	2.05%
Democratic	Jon Baron; Natalie Williams	11,880	1.77%
Democratic	Jerome Segal; Justinian M. Dispenza	4,276	0.64%
Democratic	Ralph Jaffe; Mark Greben	2,978	0.44%
Total votes		671,160	100.0%

== Independent and third-party candidates ==
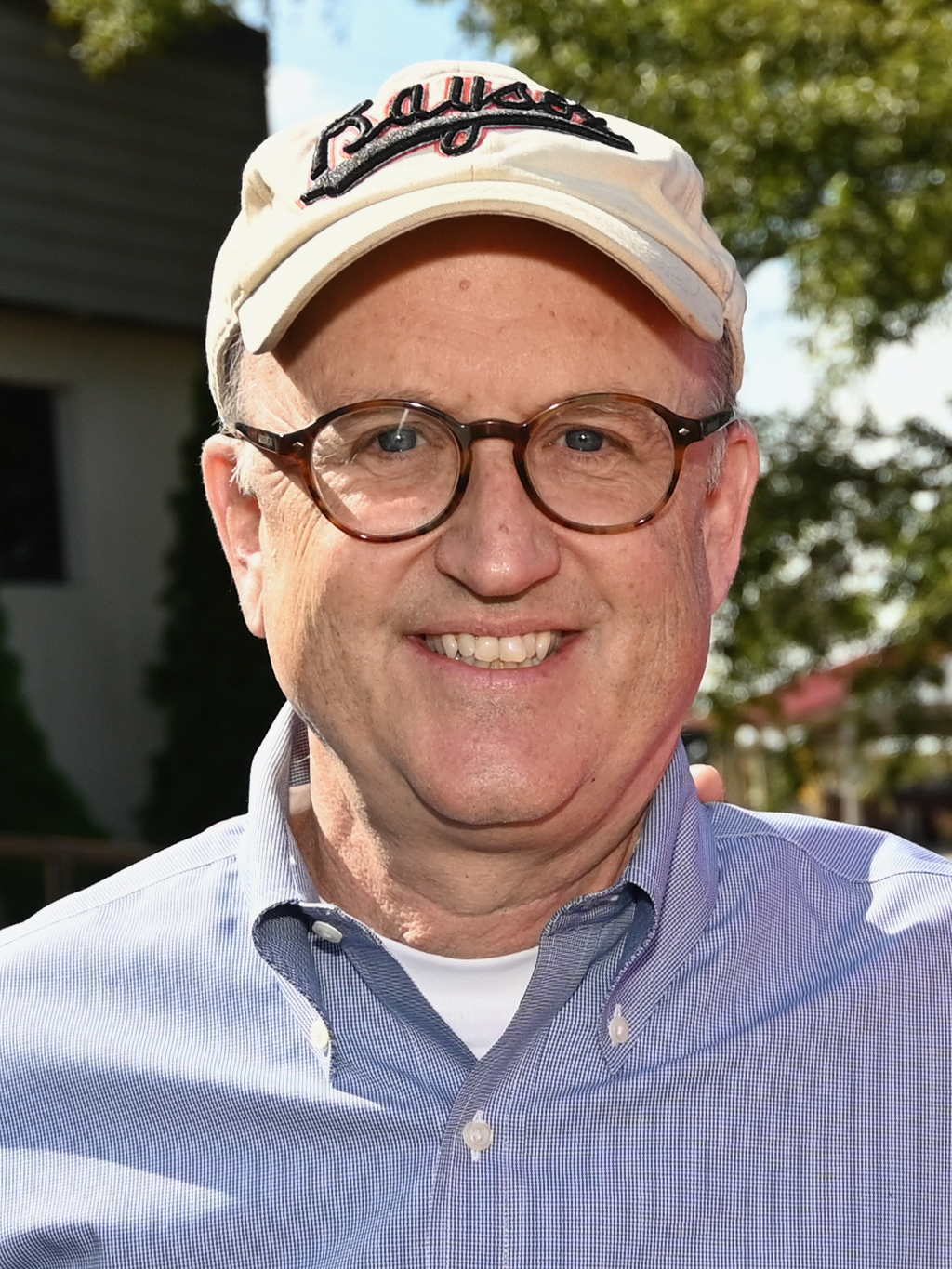
David Lashar, the Libertarian nominee

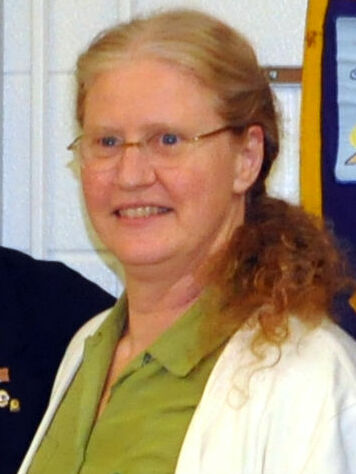
Nancy Wallace, the Green Party nominee

=== Candidates ===
==== Declared ====
- David Harding (Working Class), candidate for mayor of Baltimore in 2020
  - Running mate: Cathy White
- David Lashar (Libertarian), candidate for Maryland's 3rd congressional district in 2018
  - Running mate: Christiana Logansmith, U.S. Navy veteran and small business owner
- Nancy Wallace (Green), candidate for Maryland's 8th congressional district in 2016
  - Running mate: Patrick Elder, candidate for Maryland's 5th congressional district in 2018

==== Failed to qualify, write-in campaign ====
- Kyle Sefcik (independent), MMA fighter and small business owner
  - Running mate: Katie Lee, personal trainer

=== Debates and forums ===
David Lashar attended the gubernatorial candidate forum hosted by the Legislative Black Caucus of Maryland on October 14, 2021. At the end of the forum, Darryl Barnes challenged all of the attending candidates to post a Black agenda on their campaign websites by November 1; in response, Lashar posted a "Libertarian Black Agenda" plan on his campaign website.

The Maryland State Bar Association hosted individual, hour-long conversations with all running candidates from December 6 to December 10, 2021. Lashar attended the forum on December 8, 2021.

Lashar attended the Committee for Montgomery Legislative Breakfast gubernatorial forum on December 10, 2021.

Lashar attended both of the gubernatorial forums on climate change on March 8 and 9, 2022.

=== Fundraising ===
Primary campaign finance activity through July 3, 2022
Candidate	Raised	Spent	Cash on hand
David Harding	$1,200	$1,090	$110
David Lashar	$17,530	$8,340	$9,190
Kyle Sefcik	$5,120	$3,661	$1,459
Source: Maryland State Board of Elections

== General election ==
=== Campaign ===
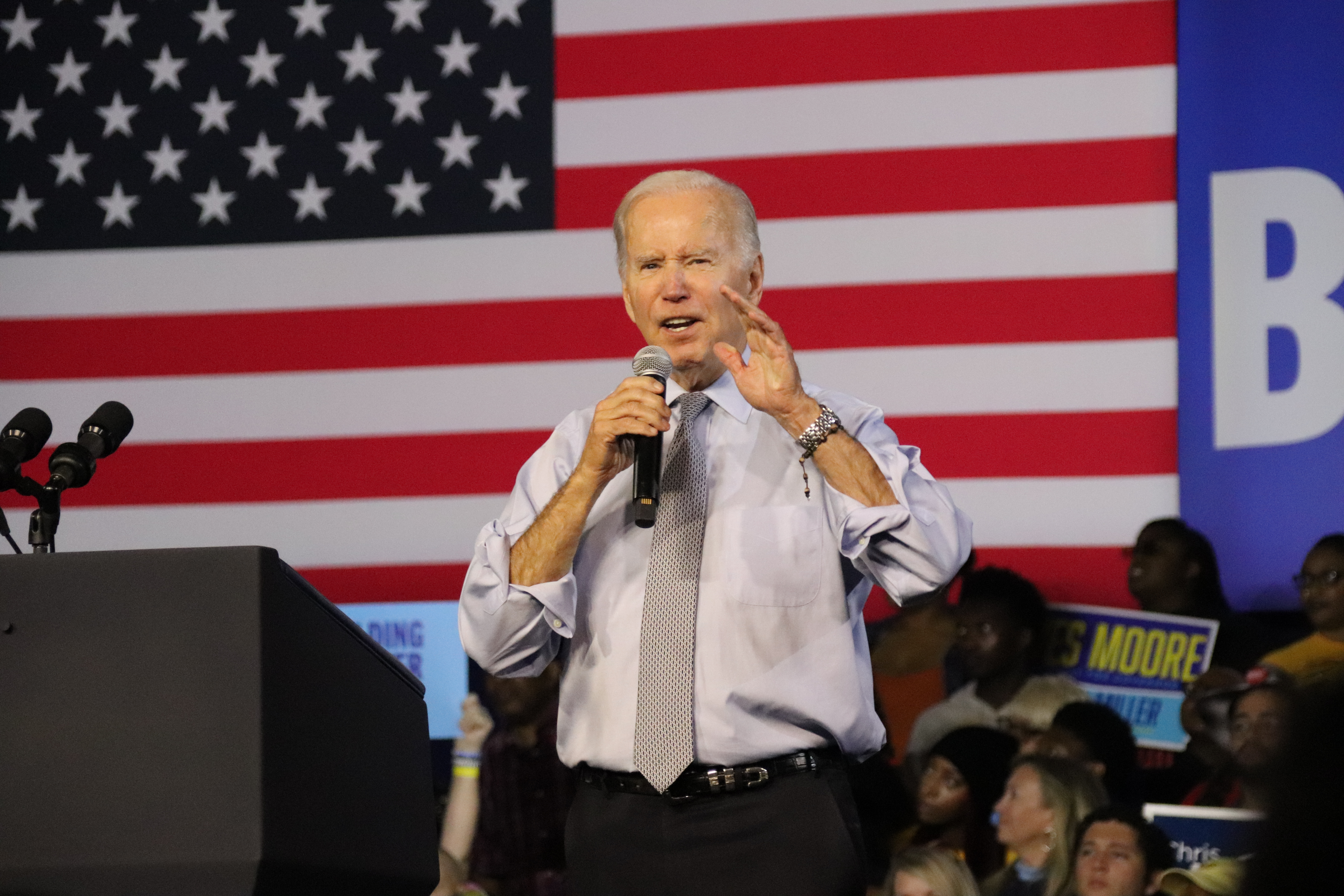
President Biden campaigning for Moore and other Maryland Democrats

Moore's campaign framed Cox as someone who would be "dangerous" in the governor's office, highlighting his role in spreading falsehoods about the 2020 presidential election and the January 6 United States Capitol attack. After the primary, Cox removed references to his role in challenging the 2020 presidential election results from his campaign website and deactivated his account on Gab, a website that has been described as a social media haven for white supremacists and neo-Nazis and was used by the perpetrator of the Pittsburgh synagogue shooting. He later described himself as a candidate with a "middle temperament approach" that was willing to work across the aisle.

Cox's campaign sought to tie Moore to the national Democratic party and President Joe Biden. He also sought to paint Moore as a communist, citing Moore's requirement that people attending fundraisers and campaign rallies be vaccinated against COVID-19. Moore countered that his service in the military and work on Wall Street and in finance would make calling him a communist a "bad stretch".

Cox was critical of Moore's refusal to debate him. In response to these criticisms, Moore said that he was "excited" to debate Cox. However, Moore's team initially declined to participate in debates with Cox, saying that they would "not otherwise share the stage with him and participate in anything that amplifies his dangerous and divisive rhetoric". On August 31, 2022, Moore agreed to a televised debate by Maryland Public Television with Cox on October 12. Moore, when asked if he wished to share the stage with Cox again following the debate, said, "I think I'm good."

=== Predictions ===
Source	Ranking	As of
The Cook Political Report	Solid D (flip)	July 26, 2022
Inside Elections	Solid D (flip)	July 22, 2022
Sabato's Crystal Ball	Safe D (flip)	August 18, 2022
Politico	Solid D (flip)	October 19, 2022
RCP	Safe D (flip)	July 20, 2022
Fox News	Solid D (flip)	October 25, 2022
538	Solid D (flip)	August 10, 2022
Elections Daily	Safe D (flip)	November 7, 2022

=== Post-primary endorsements ===
Dan Cox (R)

Executive branch officials

- Alan Keyes, former assistant secretary of state (1985–1987)
- Kash Patel, former chief of staff to the secretary of defense (2020–2021)

U.S. representatives

- Andy Harris, U.S. representative for MD-01 (2011–present)

State officials

- Bob Ehrlich, former governor of Maryland (2003–2007)
- Glenn Youngkin, governor of Virginia (2022–2026)

State legislators

- Bob Cassilly, state senator for the 34th district (2015–present)
- Justin Ready, state senator for the 5th district (2015–present)
- Johnny Ray Salling, state senator for the 6th district (2015–present)
- 8 state delegates

Local officials

- Chuck Jenkins, Frederick County sheriff (2006–present)
- Michael Peroutka, former Anne Arundel County councilor (2014–2018)

Individuals

- James Altman, priest

Organizations

- Maryland Right to Life
Wes Moore (D)

Executive branch officials

- Joe Biden, president of the United States (2021–present)
- Hillary Clinton, former U.S. secretary of state (2009–2013)
- Kamala Harris, vice president of the United States (2021–2025)
- Mary Miller, former deputy secretary of the treasury (2013–2014)
- Barack Obama, former president of the United States (2009–2017)
- Tom Perez, former secretary of labor (2013–2017) and candidate for governor in 2022

U.S. senators

- Ben Cardin, U.S. senator from Maryland (2007–2025)
- Barbara Mikulski, former U.S. senator from Maryland (1987–2017)
- Chris Van Hollen, U.S. senator from Maryland (2017–present)

U.S. representatives

- Anthony Brown, U.S. representative for MD-04 (2017–2023)
- Tom McMillen, former U.S. representative for MD-04 (1987–1993)
- Jamie Raskin, U.S. representative for MD-08 (2017–present)
- John Sarbanes, U.S. representative for MD-03 (2007– present)
- 4 other U.S. representatives

State officials

- James Blanchard, former governor of Michigan (1983–1991)
- Dereck Davis, treasurer of Maryland (2021–present)
- Peter Franchot, comptroller of Maryland (2007–2023) and candidate for governor in 2022
- Doug Gansler, former attorney general of Maryland (2007–2015) and candidate for governor in 2022
- Martin O'Malley, former governor of Maryland (2007–2015)
- Deval Patrick, former governor of Massachusetts (2007–2015)

State legislators

- Sarah Elfreth, state senator for the 30th district (2019–present)
- James Rosapepe, state senator for the 21st district (2007–present) and former U.S. ambassador to Romania (1998–2001)
- Will Smith, state senator for the 20th district (2016–present)
- 12 state delegates

Local officials

- Calvin Ball III, Howard County executive (2018–present)
- Muriel Bowser, mayor of the District of Columbia (2015–present)
- Marc Elrich, Montgomery County executive (2018–present)
- Glenn Ivey, former Prince George's County state's attorney (2003–2011)
- Ike Leggett, former Montgomery County executive (2006–2018)
- Johnny Olszewski, Baltimore County executive (2018–present)
- Brandon Scott, mayor of Baltimore (2020–present)
- Ken Ulman, former Howard County executive (2006–2014)

Party officials

- Jaime Harrison, Democratic National Committee chair (2021–present)

Individuals

- Lezli Baskerville, nonprofit executive
- Seth Goldman, executive chair of Beyond Meat
- Spike Lee, director and filmmaker
- Jason Murphy, former professional football player
- Timothy Shriver, chair of the Special Olympics
- Dia Simms, CEO of Lobos 1707
- Chris Wilcox, former professional basketball player

Labor unions

- AFSCME Councils 3 and 67
- Amalgamated Transit Union Local 689
- Laborers' International Union of North America Mid-Atlantic Region
- Laborers' Union Local 202R
- Maryland Fraternal Order of Police
- Maryland State and District of Columbia AFL–CIO
- National Nurses United
- 4 Service Employees International Union locals (Note: Locals 32BJ 400 PG, 500, and 1199)
- Teamsters
- 3 UFCW locals (Note: Locals 27, 400, and MCGEO 1994)
- 3 UNITE HERE locals (Note: Locals 7, 23, and 25)
- United Auto Workers

Organizations

- AAPI Victory Fund
- Black Economic Alliance
- CASA in Action
- Chesapeake Climate Action Network Action Fund
- Clean Water Action
- Democratic Governors Association
- EMILY's List
- End Citizens United
- Everytown for Gun Safety
- Giffords
- Human Rights Campaign
- Jewish Democratic Council of America
- Let America Vote
- Maryland State Education Association
- Maryland Sierra Club
- National Wildlife Federation Action Fund
- Planned Parenthood Action Fund
- VoteVets.org

Newspapers

- Baltimore Afro-American
- The Baltimore Sun
- The Washington Post
Declined to endorse

State officials

- Larry Hogan, governor of Maryland (2015–2023) (Republican)
- Boyd Rutherford, lieutenant governor of Maryland (2015–2023) (Republican)
- Kelly Schulz, former Maryland secretary of commerce (2019–2022) and candidate for governor in 2022 (Republican)

State legislators

- Michael Hough, state senator for the 4th district (2015–present) (Republican)
- Reid Novotny, state delegate for district 9A (2021–present) (Republican)
- Bryan Simonaire, minority leader of the Maryland Senate (2020–present) from the 31st district (2007–present) (Republican)
- Chris West, state senator for the 42nd district (2019–present) (Republican)

Local officials

- Barry Glassman, Harford County executive (2014–2023)
- Allan Kittleman, former Howard County executive (2014–2018) (Republican)

=== Debates and forums ===
2022 Maryland gubernatorial debates
No.	Date	Host	Moderator	Link	Republican	Democratic	Libertarian	Green	Working Class
P Participant A Absent N Non-invitee I Invitee W Withdrawn									
P Participant A Absent N Non-invitee I Invitee W Withdrawn					Dan Cox	Wes Moore	David Lashar	Nancy Wallace	David Harding
1	August 20, 2022	Maryland Association of Counties	Mileah Kromer; Pamela Wood	N/A	P	A	N	N	N
2	September 14, 2022	Maryland Family Network	Beth Morrow	N/A	P	P	N	N	N
3	September 27, 2022	The MSU Spokesman	Antonia Hylton	Facebook	P	A	N	N	N
4	October 3, 2022	Maryland League of Women Voters	Tonaeya Moore	YouTube	A	P	P	P	P
5	October 12, 2022	Maryland Public Television	Jason Newton	YouTube	P	P	N	N	N
6	October 13, 2022	Maryland League of Women Voters	Josh Kurtz; Len Lazarick	YouTube	P	A	P	P	P
7	October 16, 2022	Baltimoreans United in Leadership Development	Daryl Kearney	Facebook	A	P	N	N	N
8	October 19, 2022	Fox 5 DC	Tom Fitzgerald	YouTube	P	P	N	N	N

=== Fundraising ===
Primary campaign finance activity through November 15, 2022
Candidate	Raised	Spent	Cash on hand	Votes	Cost per vote
Dan Cox	$1,624,608	$1,404,031	($67,372)	644,000	$2.18
Wes Moore	$16,606,408	$13,928,533	$2,021,409	1,293,944	$10.76
David Lashar	$30,825	$23,432	$7,418	30,101	$1.02
Nancy Wallace	$22,214	$17,208	$5,006	14,580	$1.18
David Harding	$1,200	$1,200	$0	17,154	$0.07
Source: Maryland State Board of Elections

=== Polling ===
Graphical summary

Poll source	Date(s) administered	Sample size	Margin of error	Dan Cox (R)	Wes Moore (D)	Other	Undecided
OpinionWorks	October 20–23, 2022	982 (LV)	± 3.1%	27%	58%	8% (Note: Lashar (L) with 3%, Wallace (G) with 2%, Harding (WC) with 1%, and "Prefer not to say" with 2%)	6%
University of Maryland	September 22–27, 2022	810 (RV)	± 4.0%	28%	60%	3% (Note: "Neither" with 2%, "Wouldn't vote" with 1%, and "Another candidate" with 0%)	9%
Goucher College	September 8–12, 2022	748 (LV)	± 3.6%	31%	53%	7% (Note: Lashar (L) with 4%, Wallace (G) with 2%, and "Some other candidate" (volunteered response) with 1%)	10%

=== Results ===
House of Delegates district results Moore: 50–60%; 60–70%; 70–80%; 80–90%; >90%; Cox: 40–50%; 50–60%; 60–70%; 70–80%

2022 Maryland gubernatorial election
Party	Candidate	Votes	%	±%
Democratic	Wes Moore; Aruna Miller	1,293,944	64.53%	+21.02%
Republican	Dan Cox; Gordana Schifanelli	644,000	32.12%	−24.23%
Libertarian	David Lashar; Christiana Logansmith	30,101	1.50%	+0.93%
Working Class	David Harding; Cathy White	17,154	0.86%	N/A
Green	Nancy Wallace; Patrick Elder	14,580	0.73%	+0.25%
Write-in		5,444	0.27%	+0.19%
Total votes		2,005,223	100.0%	N/A
Turnout		2,031,635	49.26%	−9.80%
Registered electors		4,124,156		
Democratic gain from Republican				

==== By county ====
County	Moore/Miller		Cox/Schifanelli		Others		Margin		Total Votes
County	#	%	#	%	#	%	#	%	Total Votes
Allegany	6,796	31.32%	14,145	65.19%	756	3.48%	-7,349	-33.87%	21,697
Anne Arundel	123,929	57.37%	83,823	38.80%	8,271	3.83%	40106	18.57%	216,023
Baltimore	172,494	63.40%	88,971	32.70%	10,589	3.89%	83,523	30.70%	272,054
Baltimore City	126,768	88.11%	12,309	8.56%	4,790	3.33%	114,459	79.55%	143,867
Calvert	16,757	44.59%	19,668	52.34%	1,152	3.07%	-2,911	-7.75%	37,577
Caroline	3,447	32.13%	6,869	64.02%	413	3.85%	-3,422	-31.89%	10,729
Carroll	28,117	39.11%	40,683	56.59%	3,087	4.29%	-12,566	-17.48%	71,887
Cecil	11,992	36.27%	19,873	60.10%	1,202	3.64%	-7,881	-23.83%	33,067
Charles	37,367	68.55%	15,830	29.04%	1,313	2.41%	21,537	39.51%	54,510
Dorchester	4,715	41.02%	6,377	55.49%	401	3.49%	-1,662	-14.47%	11,493
Frederick	56,992	53.46%	46,040	43.19%	3,576	3.35%	10,952	10.27%	106,608
Garrett	2,507	22.18%	8,381	74.14%	417	3.69%	-5,874	-51.96%	11,305
Harford	45,222	43.76%	53,962	52.21%	4,162	4.03%	-8,740	-8.45%	103,346
Howard	91,031	69.87%	34,514	26.49%	4,746	3.64%	56,517	43.38%	130,291
Kent	4,394	51.92%	3,791	44.79%	278	3.28%	603	7.13%	8,463
Montgomery	269,072	78.36%	64,507	18.79%	9,792	2.85%	204,565	59.57%	343,369
Prince George's	214,971	89.23%	20,045	8.32%	5,892	2.45%	194,926	80.91%	240,908
Queen Anne's	8,913	38.92%	13,123	57.31%	863	3.77%	-4,210	-18.39%	22,899
St. Mary's	15,057	39.94%	21,150	56.10%	1,496	3.97%	-6,093	-16.16%	37,703
Somerset	2,491	36.48%	4,128	60.45%	210	3.08%	-1,637	-23.97%	6,829
Talbot	9,116	51.66%	7,935	44.97%	595	3.37%	1,181	6.69%	17,646
Washington	18,727	38.33%	28,547	58.43%	1,579	3.23%	-9,820	-20.10%	48,853
Wicomico	13,873	45.79%	15,362	50.71%	1,061	3.50%	-1,489	-4.92%	30,296
Worcester	9,196	38.64%	13,967	58.68%	638	2.68%	-4,771	-20.04%	23,801
Total	1,293,944	64.53%	644,000	32.12%	67,279	3.36%	649,944	32.41%	2,005,223

Counties that flipped from Republican to Democratic

- Anne Arundel (largest community: Glen Burnie)
- Baltimore County (largest community: Dundalk)
- Frederick (largest community: Frederick)
- Howard (largest community: Columbia)
- Kent (largest community: Chestertown)
- Talbot (largest community: Easton)

==== By congressional district ====
Moore won seven of eight congressional districts.

District	Cox	Moore	Representative
1st	54%	42%	Andy Harris
2nd	36%	60%	Dutch Ruppersberger
3rd	34%	62%	John Sarbanes
4th	8%	89%	Anthony Brown (117th Congress)
4th	8%	89%	Glenn Ivey (118th Congress)
5th	31%	66%	Steny Hoyer
6th	44%	52%	David Trone
7th	15%	81%	Kweisi Mfume
8th	17%	80%	Jamie Raskin

== See also ==
- Elections in Maryland
- 2022 United States elections
- 2022 Maryland Attorney General election
- 2022 United States Senate election in Maryland
- 2022 Maryland Senate election
- 2022 Maryland Comptroller election
- 2022 United States House of Representatives elections in Maryland
- 2022 United States gubernatorial elections
- 2022 Maryland House of Delegates election

== Notes ==
Partisan clients
