= Boyd Rutherford =

American politician and businessman (born 1957)

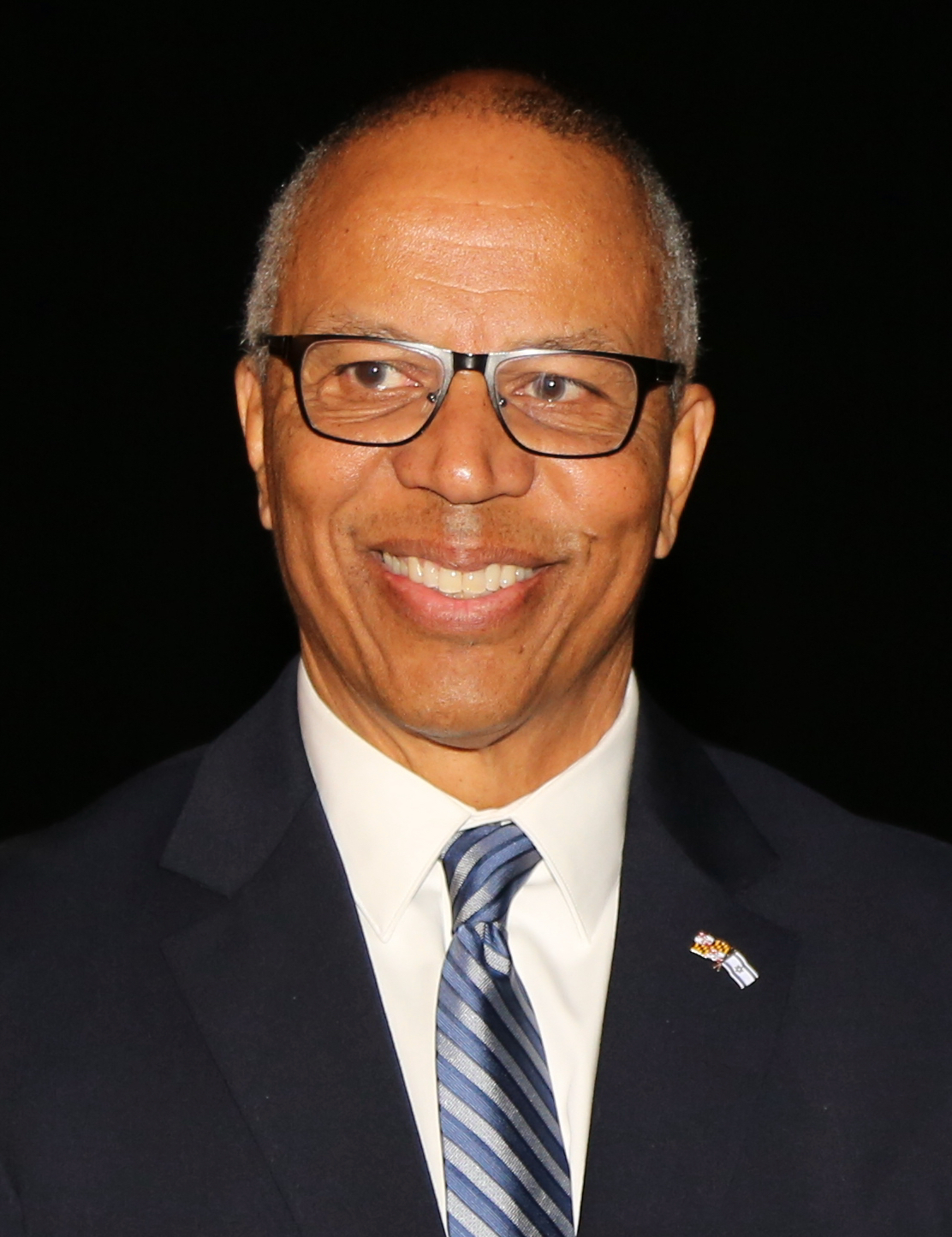
- Rutherford in 2020

9th Lieutenant Governor of Maryland
- In office January 21, 2015 – January 18, 2023
- Governor: Larry Hogan
- Preceded by: Anthony Brown
- Succeeded by: Aruna Miller

United States Assistant Secretary of Agriculture for Administration
- In office May 12, 2006 – January 20, 2009
- President: George W. Bush
- Preceded by: Michael Harrison
- Succeeded by: Pearlie Reed

Secretary of the Maryland Department of General Services
- In office January 16, 2003 – June 4, 2006; Acting: January 16, 2003 – March 13, 2003
- Governor: Bob Ehrlich
- Preceded by: Peta N. Richkus
- Succeeded by: R. Stevens Cassard Jr.

Personal details
- Born: Boyd Kevin Rutherford; April 1, 1957 (age 69) Washington, D.C., U.S.
- Party: Republican
- Other political affiliations: Democratic (until the 1990s)
- Spouse: Monica Rutherford (m. 1987)
- Children: 3
- Education: Howard University (BA); University of Southern California (MA, JD)
- Boyd Rutherford's voice Boyd Rutherford awards the Governor Larry Hogan Scholarship to Joshua Olexa; Recorded November 21, 2017

Boyd Kevin Rutherford (born April 1, 1957) is an American politician, businessman and attorney who served as the ninth lieutenant governor of Maryland from 2015 to 2023.

A member of the Republican Party, Rutherford was nominated by President George W. Bush to serve as Associate Administrator in the U.S. General Services Administration, serving from 2001 to 2003. He then joined the administration of Governor Bob Ehrlich, serving as the Secretary of General Services from 2003 to 2006. Rutherford served as Assistant Secretary for Administration to the United States Department of Agriculture from 2006 to 2009.

== Early life and education ==
Rutherford was born in Washington, D.C. to a Democratic family. His parents worked as a postal worker and as an office worker at the National Institutes of Health, and his grandmother, Thelma, was a well-known party activist and ally of Washington, D.C. mayor Marion Barry. Rutherford grew up in the Michigan Park neighborhood of D.C., where he attended public schools until the 8th grade, afterwards graduating from Archbishop Carroll High School. He earned a bachelor's degree in economics and political science from Howard University in 1979. In 1990, Rutherford earned both a Juris Doctor degree and a master's degree in communications management from the University of Southern California.

== Career ==
=== Early career ===
After graduating from Howard University, Rutherford worked as an analyst for the Bankers Trust Company from 1979 to 1981. He then worked as a marketing representative for Control Data Corporation until 1986, afterwards working as a senior account executive at Telenet for one year. Rutherford worked as the director of business development at the Kelly Law Registry from 2000 to 2001.

Rutherford is a member of the State Bars of California and Maryland, as well as the District of Columbia Bar. After earning his Juris Doctor degree, he moved back to Washington, D.C. from southern California, and worked as a litigation associate for various firms—including Daihatsu, Mitsubishi Motors, and Van Ness Feldman—from 1990 to 2000. Rutherford worked as a managing member of Eastwide Strategies LLC from 2010 to 2015, and as a counsel for Benton Potter & Murdock from 2012 to 2015.

Rutherford considered himself a political independent as a young adult. He was a registered Democratic voter while living in Washington, D.C., but left the party and became a Republican when he was in his late thirties, saying that he was fed up with the Clinton–Lewinsky scandal and believing that the Democratic Party saw African-Americans as "political and social victims". He was a member of the Howard County Republican Central Committee from 1996 to 2002, during which he served as the co-director of Ellen Sauerbrey's 1998 gubernatorial campaign and campaigned for Howard County councilmember Dennis Schrader's reelection campaign, and served as a delegate to the 2000 Republican National Convention. Rutherford was a member of the Baltimore City Brownfields Redevelopment Council from 1998 to 2000, and the Corridor Transportation Corporation from 1999 to 2000. In April 2009, Republican National Committee chair Michael Steele named Rutherford as the RNC's chief administrative officer. He served in this position until 2011.

=== Bush administration ===
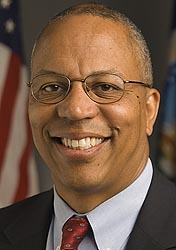
Rutherford's official portrait, 2006

In September 2001, a week after the September 11 attacks, President George W. Bush appointed Rutherford to serve as the associate administrator of the U.S. General Services Administration's Office of Small Business Utilization. He became the associate administrator of the Office of Performance Improvement in 2002. Following the resignation of Michael J. Harrison in January 2006, Bush nominated Rutherford to serve as Assistant Secretary for Administration for the United States Department of Agriculture (USDA), during which he gained a reputation as a tough-minded boss.

=== Ehrlich administration ===
On January 7, 2003, Governor-elect Bob Ehrlich appointed Rutherford as the secretary of the Maryland Department of General Services. Ehrlich's transition team chose Rutherford for this position because of his business-oriented mindset, believing that it would help bring better ideas on how to streamline government.

In May 2004, Rutherford sought to bypass the Maryland Board of Public Works's appeals process for a lucrative state contract to build a Maryland State Police crime lab after rejecting a bid from Roy Kirby & Sons, who offered to build the crime lab for $3 million less than the other bidder. Rutherford's basis for rejecting Kirby's bid was based on an investigative report by Warren Wright, a procurement advisor to the board, which detailed Kirby's attempts to obtain insider information about the state's bidding process. Kirby challenged the board's decision to reject his offer to build the crime lab, but later dropped his lawsuit after Rutherford agreed to absolve Kirby of any wrongdoing in connection with the bidding process.

In October 2004, state legislators criticized Rutherford after The Baltimore Sun reported that the state spent $2.5 million in land preservation funds to purchase an 836-acre tract of forest in St. Mary's County amid negotiations to sell it to an unnamed individual—only referred to as "the benefactor" by officials—without securing a commitment that he would forfeit the right to develop it. The Baltimore Sun later reported that the unnamed individual was Whiting-Turner Contracting Company president and CEO Willard Hackerman, a prominent political donor who gave $10,000 to the Maryland Republican Party in 2003 and would have received $7 million in tax breaks for the purchase. Rutherford testified to legislators that Governor Ehrlich personally endorsed the land deal after Rutherford informed him of the details (though Ehrlich later denied any knowledge of the deal), and that the Maryland Department of Natural Resources (DNR) showed Hackerman "a number of different properties" and allowed him to select the one he would be interested in purchasing. Rutherford also said that the state would not have purchased the land if Hackerman did not propose the transaction and that he promised to donate development rights in the future and return some of the preserved land to the county for school construction. At the same time, Hackerman told DNR officials that he planned to build houses with waterfront views on the preserved property and sought to block a federal grant that would have allowed the state to permanently preserve the area. In November 2004, Hackerman withdrew from the transaction in a letter to Rutherford and offered to donate $1 million to St. Mary's County so it could purchase part of the protected tract for school construction. After a legislative hearing on the land deal in December 2004, Rutherford told reporters that three of Ehrlich's top aides urged him to pursue the transaction and apologized for concealing Hackerman's identity in discussions about the land deal, saying that it was his idea.

== Lieutenant Governor of Maryland ==
=== Elections ===
On January 30, 2014, businessman Larry Hogan named Rutherford as his running mate in the 2014 Maryland gubernatorial election. The two had met while working in the administration of Governor Ehrlich, in which Hogan was the Maryland Secretary of Appointments. During the campaign, he described himself as a chief operating officer to the governor's chief executive role, pitching a plan that would have Cabinet secretaries report to the lieutenant governor instead of Hogan directly. After winning the Republican primary with 43 percent of the vote in June 2014, the Hogan-Rutherford ticket defeated Lieutenant Governor Anthony Brown and his running mate, Howard County Executive Ken Ulman, with 51 percent of the vote in what many considered to be an upset victory. Rutherford co-chaired the Hogan transition team with former Maryland business and economic development secretary James T. Brady.

Hogan and Rutherford ran for a second term in 2018, during which the two defeated Democratic nominees Ben Jealous and Susan Turnbull with 55.4 percent of the vote.

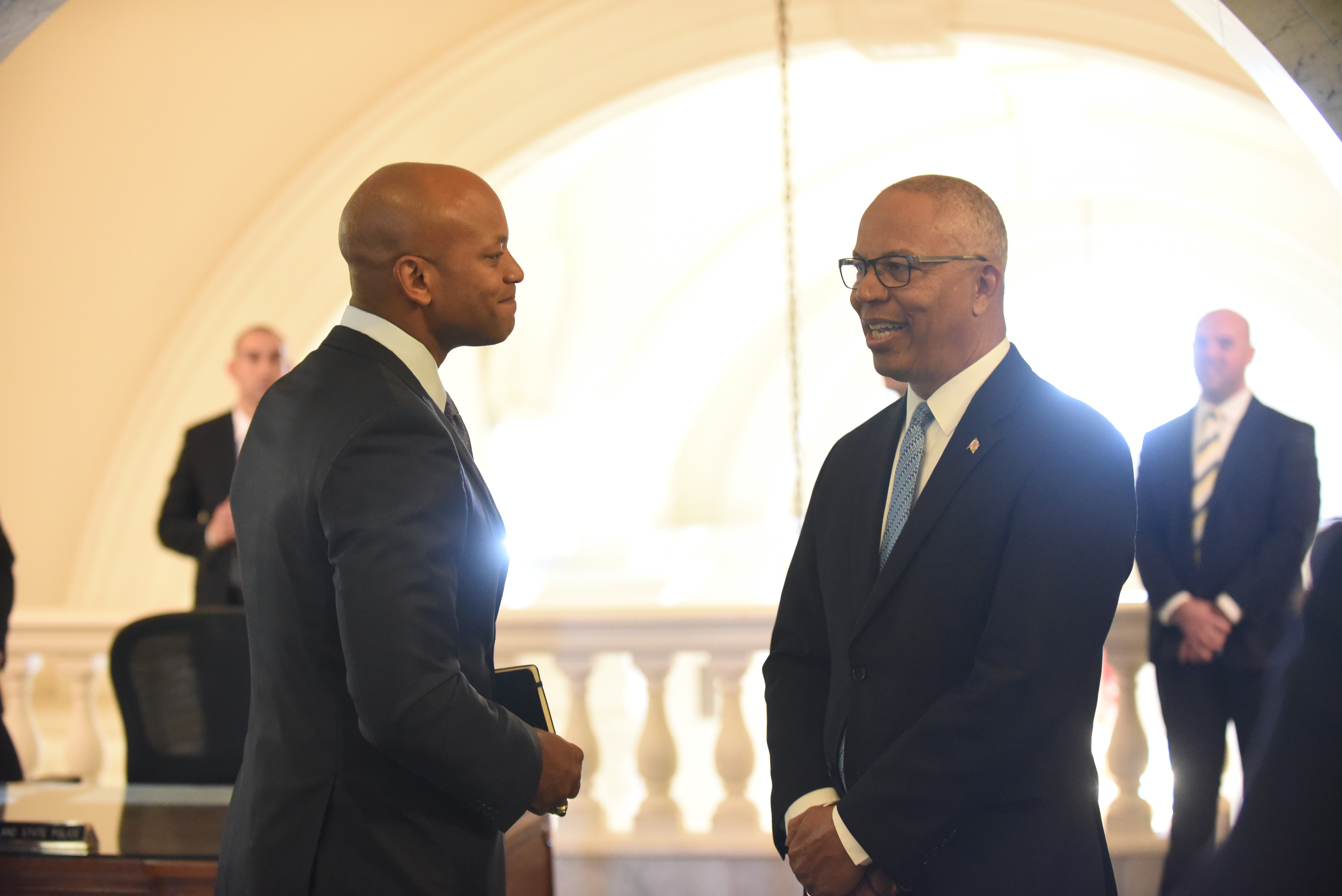
Rutherford with Governor-elect Wes Moore, November 2022

Rutherford was seen as the likely Republican frontrunner in the 2022 Maryland gubernatorial election, but he announced in April 2021 that he would not seek to succeed Governor Larry Hogan. During the Republican primary, he endorsed former Maryland Secretary of Commerce Kelly M. Schulz. After Schulz was defeated by state delegate Dan Cox in the primary, Rutherford declined to endorse Cox and correctly predicted that Democratic nominee Wes Moore would defeat him in the general election. In November 2022, Governor Hogan tasked Rutherford with handling the transition from the current administration to the newly-elected Moore-Miller administration.

=== Tenure ===
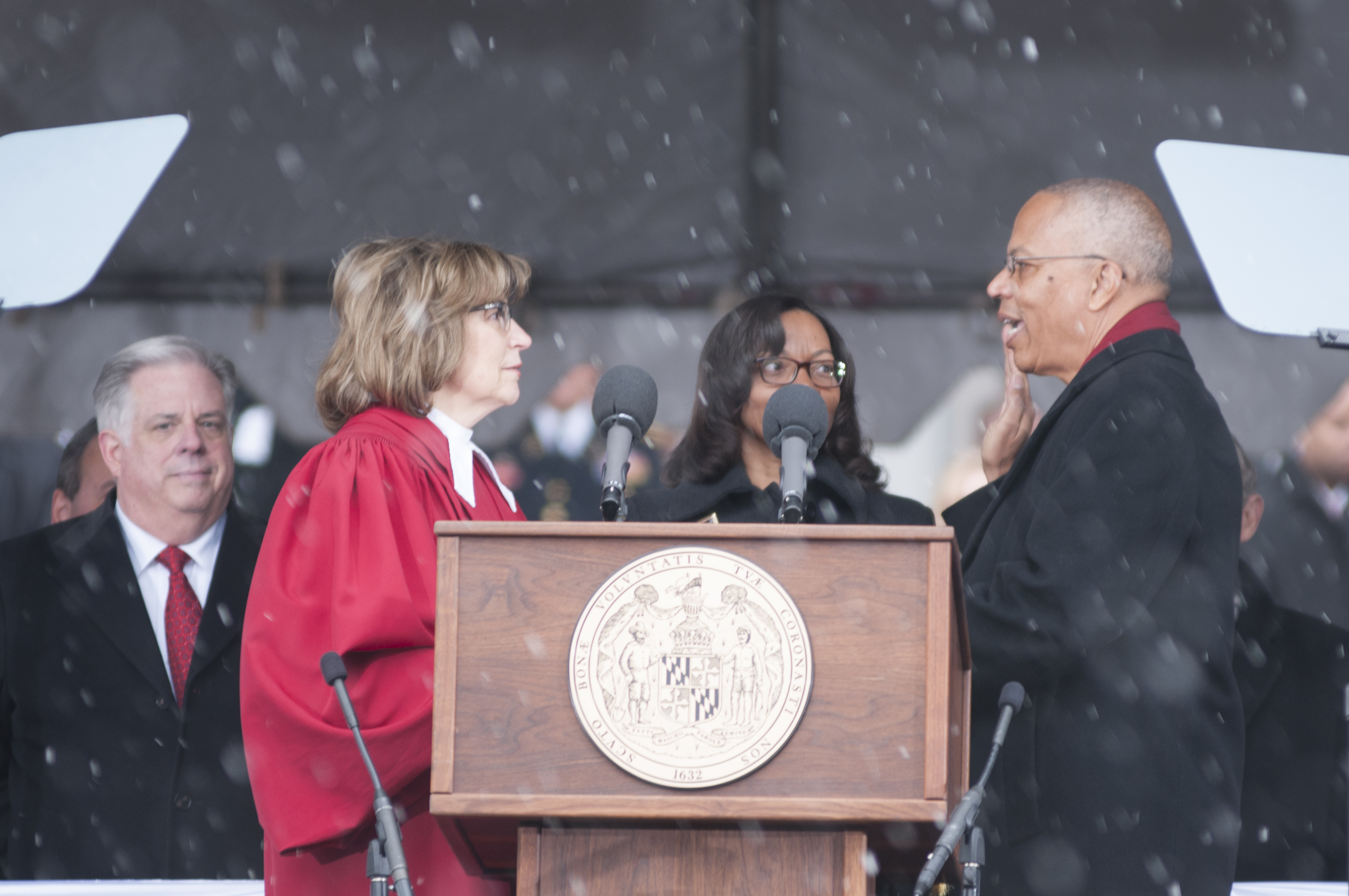
Rutherford being sworn in as lieutenant governor, 2015

Rutherford was sworn in as lieutenant governor on January 21, 2015. He was the third consecutive African American elected as lieutenant governor in Maryland. While Governor Hogan was going through treatment for lymphoma, Rutherford often acted as governor and chaired meetings on the Maryland Board of Public Works. During his tenure, Rutherford oversaw the state's efforts to combat the opioid epidemic, which focused on expanding prevention and treatment efforts as well as increased monitoring of prescription drugs, and called for increased penalties for heroin dealers. He also coordinated with city officials on the state's response to the Freddie Gray protests, promoted efforts to expand home ownership and combat lead poisoning in Baltimore, and supported bills to reform to Maryland's procurement process and to strengthen penalties for violent crime.

In June 2015, Rutherford attended the Paris Air Show to promote Maryland's aerospace and defense industries. In October 2017, he led a diplomatic mission to France, Belgium, and Estonia to discuss cybersecurity and opioid abuse with European officials. In January 2020, Rutherford traveled to Dubai and Tel Aviv to attend conferences to promote economic development in Maryland.

In December 2016, Rutherford came under criticism after giving a speech to the Jewish Community Relations Council of Greater Washington in which he condemned a recent increase in hate speech, but added that he didn't know what was causing it. State senator Cheryl Kagan condemned his remarks in a tweet, to which Rutherford replied, "You act as though hate is new. It was always there. I'd rather people show their real colors than hide", prompting further criticism. Rutherford clarified his tweet about a day after posting it, saying that he believed that the United States could benefit from a candid discussion about racially motivated hate and pointing out that he grew up during the Civil Rights movement.

During the COVID-19 pandemic, Rutherford oversaw non-COVID-19 portions of the government so that Governor Hogan could focus entirely on the pandemic. He defended the Hogan administration's COVID-19 vaccine rollout and the Board of Public Works's use of emergency procurement powers during the pandemic, and criticized the legislature for overriding Governor Hogan's vetoes on the Blueprint for Maryland's Future and a digital advertising tax to pay for the education reform package, citing the economic impact of the pandemic.

== Post-lieutenant gubernatorial career ==
In January 2023, Rutherford joined Columbia, Maryland law firm Davis, Agnor, Rapaport & Skalny LLC as a government relations and lobbying personnel. In March 2023, he published Rutherford's Travels, a book that documents his visits to all 76 Maryland state parks during his second term as lieutenant governor. In April 2023, Rutherford joined the Dr. Nancy Grasmick Leadership Institute at Towson University as its inaugural senior fellow.

== Political positions ==
Rutherford has described himself as a fiscal conservative and social moderate, distancing himself from the religious right on issues including abortion and same-sex marriage, and believing in business development as a way to empowerment. As lieutenant governor, Rutherford gained a reputation as a "policy wonk".

In 2012, Rutherford criticized Vice President Joe Biden for suggesting that Republicans sought to enslave African Americans. In 2013, he condemned NAACP chairman Julian Bond's contention that Republicans who affiliated with the Tea Party movement were racist, saying that Bond was the reason he was no longer a member of the NAACP. He also rebuked the Internal Revenue Service for investigating conservative organizations.

During his 2014 lieutenant gubernatorial campaign, Rutherford criticized Governor Martin O'Malley's rollout of Maryland's health exchange and economic policies, and expressed support for police body cameras and the state's minority-owned businesses. He opposed the Purple Line, suggesting that its projected $2.45 billion construction cost would be better spent on highway expansion. After Governor Hogan cancelled the Red Line in June 2015, Rutherford suggested a rapid bus line as an alternative to the transit line.

In July 2015, Rutherford attended and spoke at an anti-gerrymandering rally in Annapolis, during which he criticized Maryland's congressional districts, especially the 3rd district, as a terrible situation. He supported bills introduced by Governor Larry Hogan that would require the state to use an independent redistricting commission to draw its congressional districts.

Rutherford declined to support Republican presidential nominee Donald Trump in the 2016 United States presidential election. In July 2019, he criticized President Trump's "rat and rodent infested mess" comments toward the city of Baltimore. In January 2021, following the January 6 United States Capitol attack, Rutherford called Trump's incitement of violence at the U.S. Capitol an "impeachable offense" and called for Trump's resignation. In an interview following the attack, he told The Baltimore Sun that he believed that Trump's supporters did not represent the core of the Maryland Republican Party, saying that he and Hogan represented the party's establishment. He also said that Trump "took advantage of the Republican Party" and suggested that he did not care about the party.

In October 2019, Rutherford voted to remove the Confederate battle flag from a Maryland State House plaque that honored both Union and Confederate soldiers who fought in the American Civil War, calling the flag a "divisive symbol that has no place in this or any statehouse". In June 2020, Rutherford voted to remove the plaque without a replacement; later that month, he voted for a proposal to install a new marker in its place, which failed to pass after the State House Trust deadlocked 2–2.

In June 2020, Rutherford described the murder of George Floyd as a "turning point in our nation" and a signal for the county to examine the racism "that exists just under the surface of many institutions". He also said he stood with those participating in George Floyd protests.

In December 2020, Rutherford voted to approve a wetlands license for the proposed Eastern Shore Pipeline.

== Personal life ==
Rutherford and his wife Monica live in Columbia, Maryland, and they have three adult children; one son and two daughters.

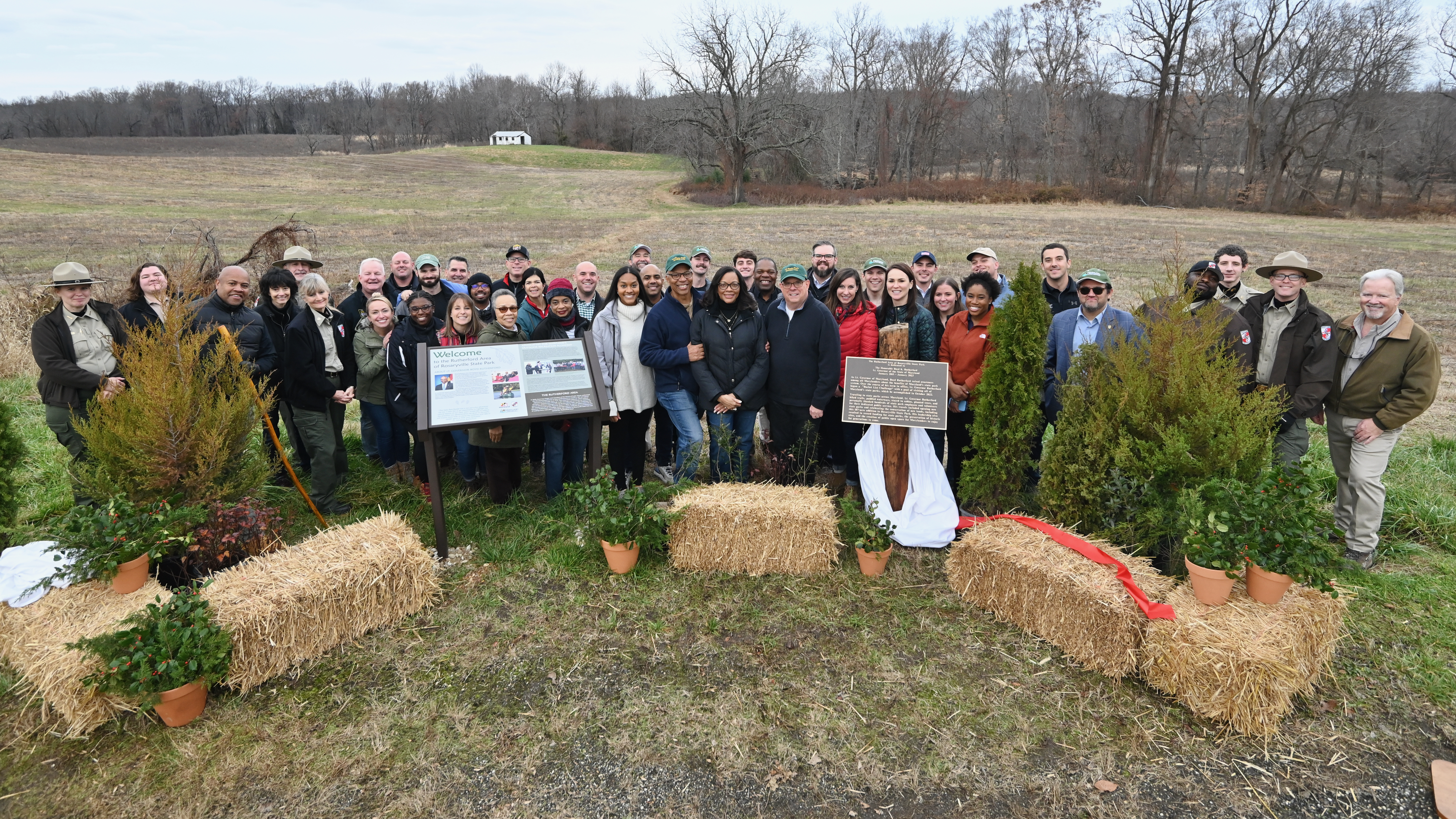
Rutherford, his wife, and Governor Hogan at the Rutherford Area, 2022

In December 2022, a 187-acre area in Rosaryville State Park was named the "Rutherford Area", in honor of Rutherford.

== Electoral history ==
Maryland gubernatorial Republican primary election, 2014
Party	Candidate	Votes	%
Republican	Larry Hogan; Boyd Rutherford	92,376	43.0
Republican	David R. Craig; Jeannie Haddaway-Riccio	62,639	29.1
Republican	Charles Lollar; Kenneth R. Timmerman	33,292	15.5
Republican	Ron George; Shelley Aloi	26,628	12.4

Maryland gubernatorial election, 2014
Party	Candidate	Votes	%
Republican	Larry Hogan; Boyd Rutherford	884,400	51.0
Democratic	Anthony Brown; Kenneth Ulman	818,890	47.2
Libertarian	Shawn Quinn; Lorenzo Gaztanaga	25,382	1.5
Write-in		4,505	0.2

Maryland gubernatorial election, 2018
Party	Candidate	Votes	%
Republican	Larry Hogan (incumbent); Boyd Rutherford (incumbent)	1,275,644	55.4
Democratic	Ben Jealous; Susan Turnbull	1,002,639	43.5
Libertarian	Shawn Quinn; Christina Smith	13,241	0.6
Green	Ian Schlakman; Annie Chambers	11,175	0.5
Write-in		1,813	0.1

== See also ==
- List of African-American Republicans
- List of minority governors and lieutenant governors in the United States

Political offices
Preceded by Anthony Brown	Lieutenant Governor of Maryland; 2015–2023	Succeeded by Aruna Miller
