= Jerome Segal =

American philosopher and activist (born 1943)

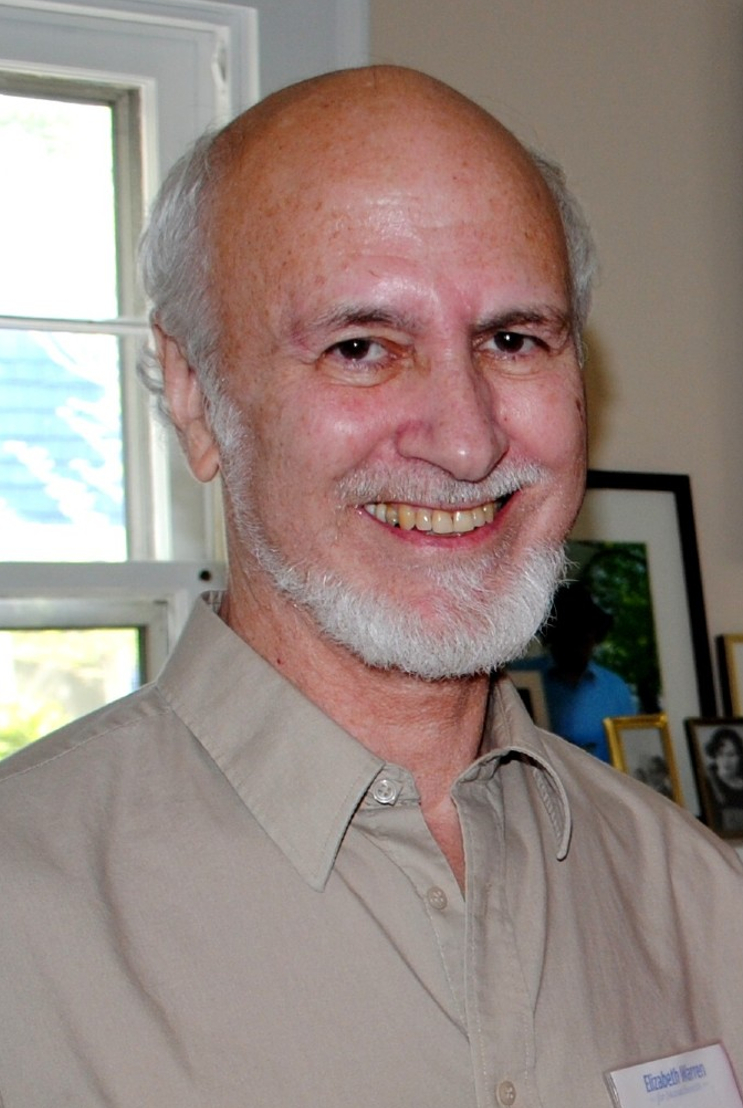
- Born: November 25, 1943 (age 82); New York City, U.S.
- Education: City College of New York (BA); University of Michigan (MA, PhD); University of Minnesota (MPA)
- Political party: Democratic (before 2018, 2021–present); Bread and Roses (2018–2021)

Jerome Michael Segal (born November 25, 1943) is an American philosopher, political activist, and perennial candidate who resides in Silver Spring, Maryland. He was the founder of the socialist, progressive, and somewhat libertarian Bread and Roses Party, which achieved ballot access in Maryland in January 2019, and which Segal ran from 2018 to 2021.

Segal is a research scholar at the University of Maryland, College Park, and the president of the Jewish Peace Lobby. He was a candidate in the Democratic Party primary in the 2018 United States Senate election in Maryland. He unsuccessfully ran in the 2020 United States presidential election and the 2022 Maryland gubernatorial election.

== Early life and education ==
Segal was born and raised in The Bronx. His father, a socialist and member of the Jewish Labor Bund, was born in Poland and immigrated to the United States, where he found employment as a factory worker in the garment industry. After graduating from the Bronx High School of Science, Segal went to City College of New York, where he received honors in philosophy and economics, and was awarded the Brittain Prize in Moral Philosophy. Segal went on to receive a PhD from the University of Michigan, and taught in the philosophy department of the University of Pennsylvania. He later received an MPA from the Humphrey School of Public Affairs of the University of Minnesota.

== Career ==
After receiving his MPA from the University of Minnesota, Segal moved to Washington, D.C. in 1974 to work as an aide to Congressman Donald M. Fraser and administrator of the House Budget Committee's task force on distributive impacts of economic policy. In 1979, he became Coordinator for the Near East in the policy bureau of the US Agency for International Development and, later, Senior Advisor for Agency Planning. After leaving government, he joined the Institute for Philosophy and Public Policy at the University of Maryland as Senior Research Scholar.

Segal has been a leader of the American Jewish peace movement, starting in 1982 with Washington Area Jews for Israeli-Palestinian Peace (WAJIPP), a group that opposed the Israeli invasion of Lebanon. In 1987, he traveled to Tunis to meet Yasser Arafat and leaders of the Palestine Liberation Organization. No American Jewish delegation had ever met with the PLO, which the U.S. government officially considered a terrorist organization at the time. In August 1988, Israel raided the offices of Faisal al-Husseini, a Palestinian militant, and discovered a plan, based in part on earlier writings by Segal, for a ''declaration of Palestinian independence." That plan, along with other writings by Segal in Palestinian papers such as Al-Quds, were a catalyst for the Palestinian Declaration of Independence later that year and the Palestinian peace initiative in which Israel's right to exist was recognized.

In May 1989, Segal founded the Jewish Peace Lobby, which he envisioned as acting as a counterweight to the American Israel Public Affairs Committee (AIPAC). The Peace Lobby remains active today, with about 5,000 members (including 400 rabbis).

== As a candidate ==
Jerome Segal's performance by county in the state of Maryland in the 2020 presidential election. Legend: 0.0-0.1% 0.1-0.2% 0.2-0.3% >0.3%

Segal ran for a seat in the US Senate against incumbent Senator Ben Cardin in the 2018 midterm elections. After losing in the Democratic primary to Cardin, he attempted to be included in the general election under the Bread and Roses party, but was prohibited due to the "sore loser" statute of Maryland state law, which prohibits candidates from running in the general election after losing a primary.

=== Bread and Roses Party ===
Bread and Roses Party
- Abbreviation: BRP
- Founded: 2018; 8 years ago
- Ideology: Socialism
- Political position: Left-wing

After the 2018 election, Segal founded a new socialist political party called "Bread and Roses", after submitted a petition with more than 15,000 signatures to the Maryland Board of Elections. The party is named after a slogan used by striking workers during the 1912 Lawrence textile strike.

The Board certified the Bread and Roses party in January 2019, allowing its candidates to run for office in Maryland in the 2020 election.

In August 2019, Segal announced a run in the 2020 United States presidential election under the Bread and Roses party banner. He said that he would not compete in swing states to avoid taking votes from a Democratic candidate running against Donald Trump.

The Bread and Roses party identified itself as "socialistic" in nature, distinguishing itself from "traditional socialism". The party advocated socialist ideals such as "From each according to his abilities, to each according to his needs" while also advocating democratic principles of limited government, individual liberty and rule of law. Their website also advertised ideals like "plain living, high thinking and a Utopian future".

==== Disbanding ====
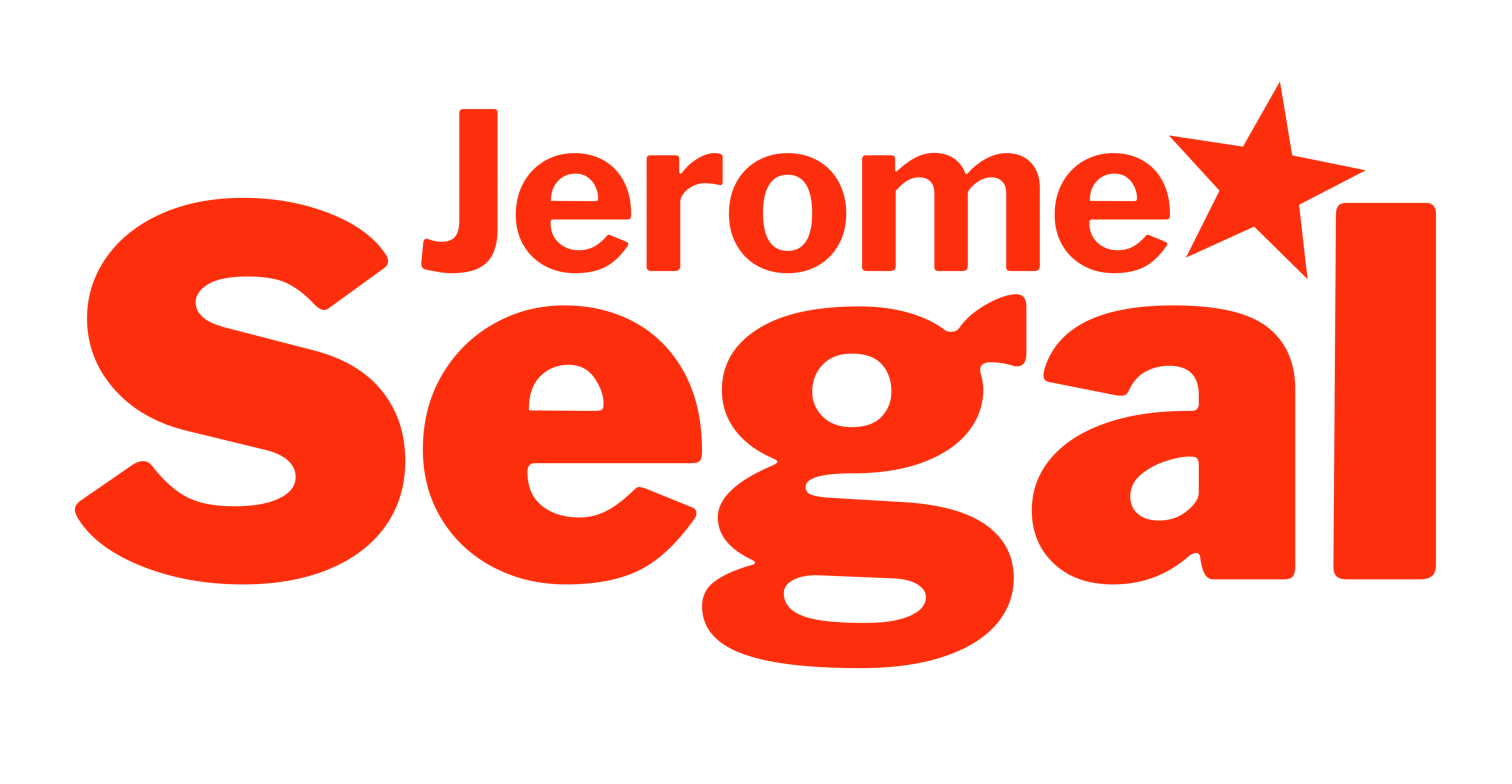
The logo of Segal's 2024 presidential campaign

In December 2021, Segal disbanded the Bread and Roses party to seek the Democratic nomination for the 2022 Maryland gubernatorial election. His running mate was Justin Dispenza, a member of the town council of Galena, Maryland. After conceding in the Democratic primary on July 20, 2022, Segal started a campaign for 2024 United States presidential election as a Democrat.

In July 2022, Segal, announced he would challenge Joe Biden in the 2024 Democratic Party presidential primaries, Segal dropped out in May 2023 to run for the vacant senate seat in Maryland. Segal never filed to run for the U.S. Senate with the Maryland State Board of Elections and did not appear on the ballot.

== Books ==
- Creating the Palestinian State
- Agency and Alienation
- Negotiating Jerusalem
- Graceful Simplicity
- Joseph's Bones
- Agency, Illusion, and Well-Being
- 85 Rochdale Road
