= Lezli Baskerville =

American lawyer

- Born: January 22, 1956 (age 70); Montclair, New Jersey, U.S.
- Education: Rutgers University (BA); Howard University (JD)
- Occupation: Lawyer

Lezli Baskerville (born January 22, 1956) is an American lawyer, judge, and is the president and CEO of the National Association for Equal Opportunity in Higher Education.

== Early life ==
Baskerville was born in Montclair, New Jersey, to Marjorie Baskerville and Charles W. Baskerville. Her mother was a teacher and social worker, and her father was a marketing executive. She was born an identical twin to Dr. Renee E. Baskerville, a physician and mayor of Montclair.

She graduated from Montclair High School. She earned her bachelor's degree from Douglass Residential College in New Jersey. She earned her J.D. from Howard University School of Law in Washington, D.C., in 1979. She graduated cum laude and was trained as a constitutional rights lawyer. She graduated from the Executive Management Program for Minority Directors at Northwestern University’s Kellogg School of Management.

== Career ==
For ten years between 1989 and 1999, Baskerville managed a private legal and legislative services collective, The Baskerville Group. Then, From 1999 until 2003, Baskerville was vice president for government relations for The College Board. She was the chief executive officer of the Washington, D.C., office and oversaw many programs. She served as co-chair of the Pathways to College Network. She also helped lead the design of the College Board's Equity Initiative, as well as the National Dialogue on Student Financial Aid.

Baskerville served as executive director of the National Black Leadership Roundtable. She also served as the appellate counsel at the Lawyers' Committee for Civil Rights Under Law. For twenty years, Baskerville served pro bono for the National Association for Equal Opportunity in Higher Education. Additionally, she served as national legislative counsel for the National Association for the Advancement of Colored People. She also was an administrative appeals judge in Washington, D.C.

In 2004, Baskerville became the president and CEO of the National Association for Equal Opportunity in Higher Education. She was its first female president and was also the first person to lead the organization who is not a current president of a Black college or university. She serves on the Department of Homeland Security's Academic Advisory Commission, as well as the HBCU Capital Finance Board and the STEM4US Board.

== Honors and awards ==
Baskerville was named one of the 100 Women Leaders in STEM by StemConnector. She was named one of the 25 Women Making a Difference by Diverse Issues in Higher Education. AOL Black Voices named her one of the Top 10 Black Women in Higher Education. Ebony Magazine named her one of the Top 100 Most Influential Association Leaders for six straight years. She has received an honorary doctorate from Benedict College. In 1998, she was inducted into The Douglass Society by Douglass College.

== Personal life ==
Baskerville currently lives in Washington, D.C.
