= Bethesda Magazine =

American regional magazine

- Editor: Kathleen Seiler Near
- Categories: Regional magazine
- Frequency: Bimonthly
- Publisher: Jennifer Farkas
- Founder: Steve Hull
- Founded: September 2004; 21 years ago
- First issue: September / October 2004
- Country: United States
- Based in: Bethesda, Maryland, U.S.
- Language: English
- Website: bethesdamagazine.com

Bethesda Magazine is a bimonthly magazine distributed in Montgomery County, Maryland since 2004. It is named after the prosperous suburban area Montgomery County, Maryland. The magazine was founded by Steve Hull. The magazine's core focuses are local feature journalism, guide book-style articles, and real estate advice magazine.

== History ==
Steve Hull founded Bethesda Magazine in 2004. In April 2015 Bethesda Magazine acquired an online news provider Bethesda Now and integrated it into its website. Bethesda Now, founded in 2012, was folded into the magazine's daily news service Bethesda Beat.

In March 2021, Hull announced that he had sold Bethesda Magazine and Bethesda Beat to Scott and Jillian Copeland of Rockville, Maryland. In February 2023, Bethesda Magazine rebranded to MoCo360. In February 2024, the magazine was acquired by Today Media. Bethesda Beat was renamed to Bethesda Today in January 2025.
