= Latin Opinion =

Newspaper in Baltimore, Maryland

Latin Opinion Newspaper & Hispanic Multimedia Platform
- Type: Monthly
- Format: Tabloid
- Owner(s): Erick A. Oribio Quintana
- Founded: 2004
- Headquarters: Baltimore, Maryland
- Website: latinopinionbaltimore.com

Latin Opinion is a bilingual monthly newspaper published in Baltimore, Maryland. It is published in both Spanish and English. The paper was founded in 2004 to serve the Baltimore Hispanic community's desire for a Spanish-language newspaper. The newspaper distributes 5,000 copies to churches, businesses, and community organizations in the Baltimore area.
