= Chesapeake Climate Action Network =

US Climate Change organization

- Founded: July 1, 2002
- Founder: Mike Tidwell
- Type: 501(c)(3) nonprofit organization
- Location: Takoma Park, Maryland
- Executive director: Michael Tidwell
- Chair: Lise Van Susteren
- Revenue: $886,442 (2013)
- Expenses: $1,121,536 (2013)
- Employees: 21 (2012)
- Website: www.chesapeakeclimate.org

The Chesapeake Climate Action Network (CCAN) is a grassroots nonprofit organization dedicated to fighting global warming in Maryland, Virginia, and the District of Columbia. The organization's mission is to foster a rapid societal switch to sustainable energy and energy-efficient products, joining similar efforts worldwide to address global warming.

== Background ==
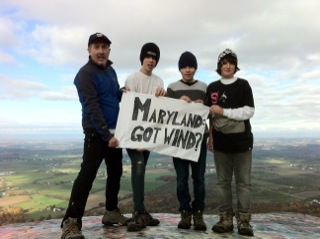
CCAN Director Mike Tidwell on Quirauk Mountain advocating for clean energy

The Chesapeake Climate Action Network was launched on July 1, 2002, with a seed grant from the Rockefeller Brothers Fund.

Working with a large and growing network of allies, the group helped pass an Offshore Wind Bill in Maryland, statewide carbon caps in Maryland, clean cars bills in Maryland and the District of Columbia, renewable energy standard bills in Maryland, Virginia, and the District of Columbia.

== See also ==
- Climate change in Maryland
- Climate change in Virginia
- Climate change in Washington, D.C.
