= Susan Turnbull =

American politician

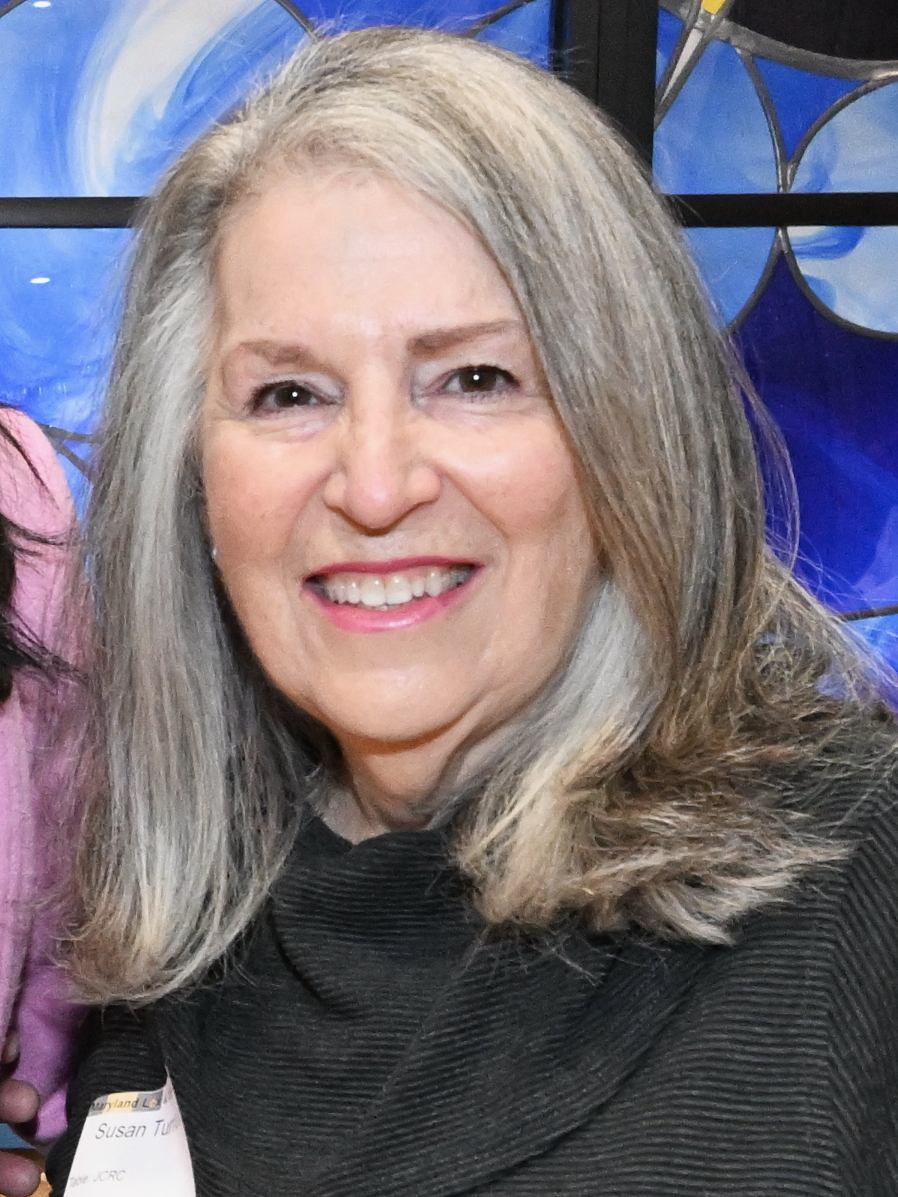

Chair of the Maryland Democratic Party
- In office February 2009 – March 5, 2011
- Preceded by: Michael Cryor
- Succeeded by: Peter O'Malley

Personal details
- Born: November 2, 1952 (age 73)
- Party: Democratic
- Spouse: Bruce Turnbull
- Children: 2
- Education: University of Cincinnati (BS); Marymount University (BA); University of Maryland, College Park (MA)

Susan Wolf Turnbull (born November 2, 1952) is an American politician. She was the Democratic nominee for lieutenant governor in the 2018 Maryland gubernatorial election, alongside candidate for governor Ben Jealous. Previously, she served as chair of the Maryland Democratic Party and vice chair of the Democratic National Committee.

== Education ==
Turnbull earned a Bachelor of Arts degree in interior design from Marymount University, a Bachelor of Science in community services and urban affairs from the University of Cincinnati, and a Master of Science in urban studies from the University of Maryland, College Park.

== Career ==
Turnbull was a member of the Hillel board of directors from 2008 to 2012. On behalf of Hillel, she was the featured speaker at numerous Campus Hillel communities across the country from 2004 to 2008.

Turnbull was an officer and board member of the Jewish Social Service Agency of Washington, DC's Board of Directors from 1984 to 2012. Turnbull serves on the board of the University of Maryland Institute for Citizenship and Politics and the board of the Jewish Community Relations Council of Greater Washington, D.C. She also served as chair of Jewish Women International from 2009 to 2013 and has been a member of the Council of Presidents of Major American Jewish Organizations since 2009.

From 1992 to 2011, Turnbull was a member of the Democratic National Committee (DNC), serving as vice chair from 2005 to 2009 and deputy chair from 2003 to 2005. Previously, she was the chair of both the DNC Women's Caucus and DNC Women's Leadership Forum. From 2009 to 2011, Turnbull chaired the Maryland Democratic Party and led the Maryland Democrats to a reelection victories for incumbent governor Martin O'Malley and Senator Barbara Mikulski. During her tenure at the DNC, Turnbull was a regular political commentator on MSNBC and Fox News from 1998 to 2010, as well as a guest on over 500 radio shows. She was a principal speaker at events in more than 35 states and several foreign countries on behalf of the DNC and three presidential campaigns. She previously served as the chair of the Montgomery County Board of Zoning Appeals.

On November 29, 2017, Ben Jealous, candidate for the Democratic nomination for Maryland governor in the 2018 election, announced the selection of Turnbull as his running mate.

== Personal life ==
Turnbull lives in Bethesda, Maryland, with her husband Bruce, an attorney. They have two adult sons.

== Sources ==
- Maryland Democratic Party Bio for Susan Turnbull
- Democratic National Committee Bio for Susan Turnbull

Party political offices
Preceded by Michael Cryor	Chair of the Maryland Democratic Party; 2009–2011	Succeeded by Peter O'Malley
Preceded by Kenneth Ulman	Democratic nominee for Lieutenant Governor of Maryland; 2018	Succeeded by Aruna Miller
