= Maryland Department of General Services =

Government of Maryland agency that manages multi-agency state facilities

Agency overview
- Jurisdiction: Government of Maryland
- Headquarters: Baltimore, Maryland; 39°18′5.04″N 76°37′19.15″W
- Agency executive: Atif Chaudhry, Secretary
- Child agency: Maryland Capitol Police
- Website: Official website

The Maryland Department of General Services is a Government of Maryland agency that manages, operates, and maintains multi-agency state facilities in the State of Maryland. As of 2023, the department was headed by Atif Chaudhry. It is the parent organization of the Maryland Capitol Police.
