= Ryan Spiegel =

American politician (born 1978)

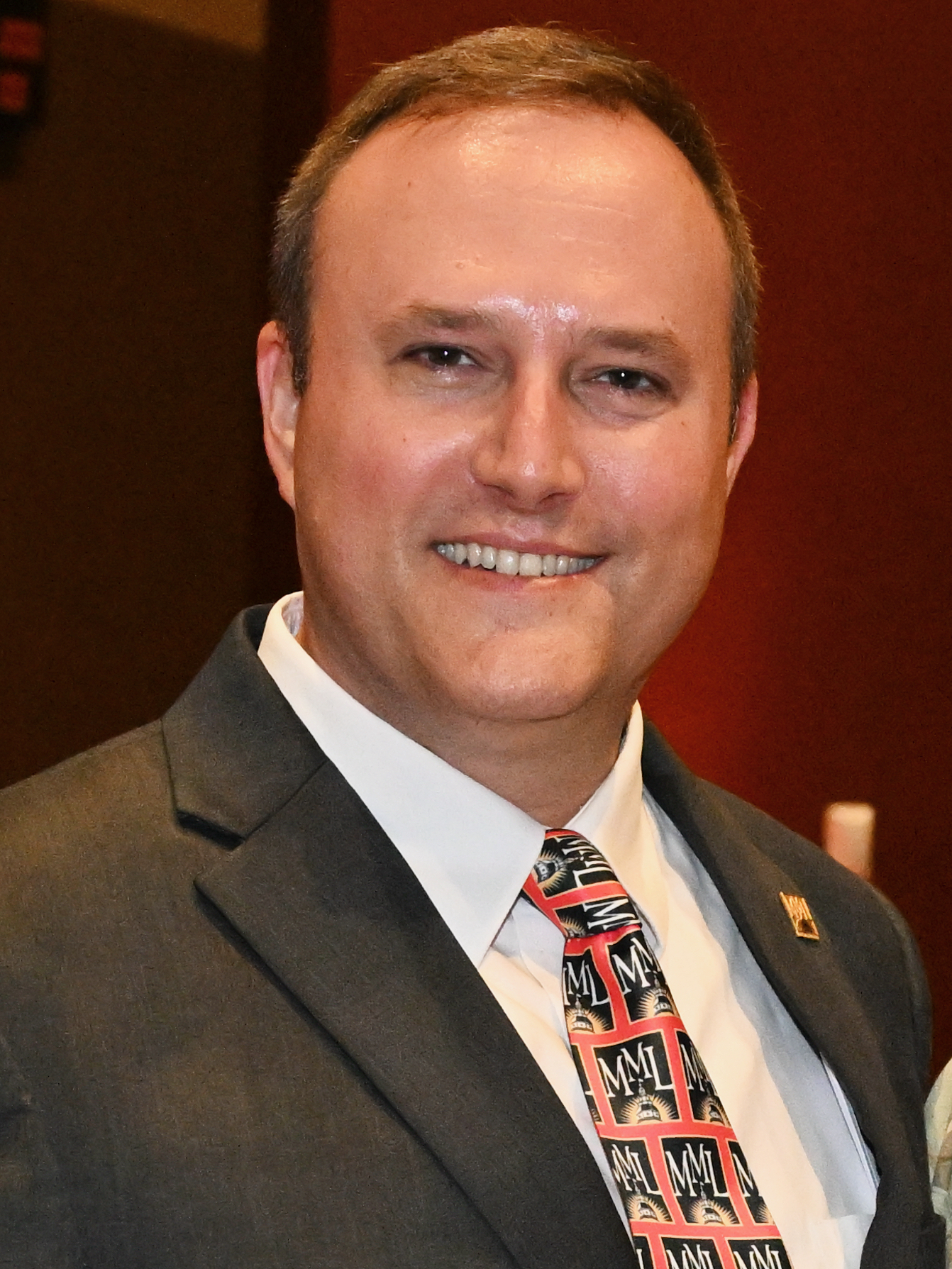
- Spiegel in 2023

Member of the Maryland House of Delegates from the 17th district
- Incumbent
- Assumed office July 6, 2023 Serving with Joe Vogel and Julie Palakovich Carr
- Appointed by: Wes Moore
- Preceded by: Kumar Barve

Member of the Gaithersburg City Council
- In office November 7, 2007 – July 6, 2023
- Preceded by: John Schlichting
- Succeeded by: Yamil Hernández

Personal details
- Born: July 6, 1978 (age 48)
- Party: Democratic
- Spouse: Rachael
- Children: 2
- Education: University of Maryland, College Park (BA); Stanford Law School (JD)
- Occupation: Attorney
- Website: Campaign website

Ryan Scott Spiegel (born July 6, 1978) is an American politician and attorney who is a member of the Maryland House of Delegates from District 17 since 2023. He previously served as a member of the Gaithersburg, Maryland city council from 2007 to 2023.

== Background ==
Spiegel graduated from Pikesville High School in 1996 and later attended the University of Maryland, College Park, earning a Bachelor of Arts degree in journalism in 2000, and Stanford University, where he earned his Juris Doctor degree in 2003. After graduating, he moved into the Whitney apartments, while he worked at various law firms, including Winston & Strawn, Potomac Law Group, and Thompson Hine LLP.

In August 2005, Spiegel formed an exploratory committee to consider running for the Maryland House of Delegates in District 17. By April 2006, he had raised $30,000 towards his election campaign. He was defeated in the Democratic primary, placing fourth with 13.3 percent of the vote.

== Gaithersburg City Council ==
Spiegel was elected to the Gaithersburg City Council in 2007, and was subsequently re-elected in 2011, 2015, and 2019.

In December 2013, Spiegel announced his candidacy for the Montgomery County Council in District 3, seeking to succeed Councilmember Phillip Andrews. He was defeated in the Democratic primary, placing third with 22 percent of the vote.

From 2019 to 2020, Spiegel served as the president of the Maryland Municipal League. In this position, he criticized efforts to pass legislation making it easier to install 5G cell towers in the state, calling it a "land grab" by the telecommunications industry and saying that he wanted to "avoid any reasonable regulation of this technology".

== In the legislature ==
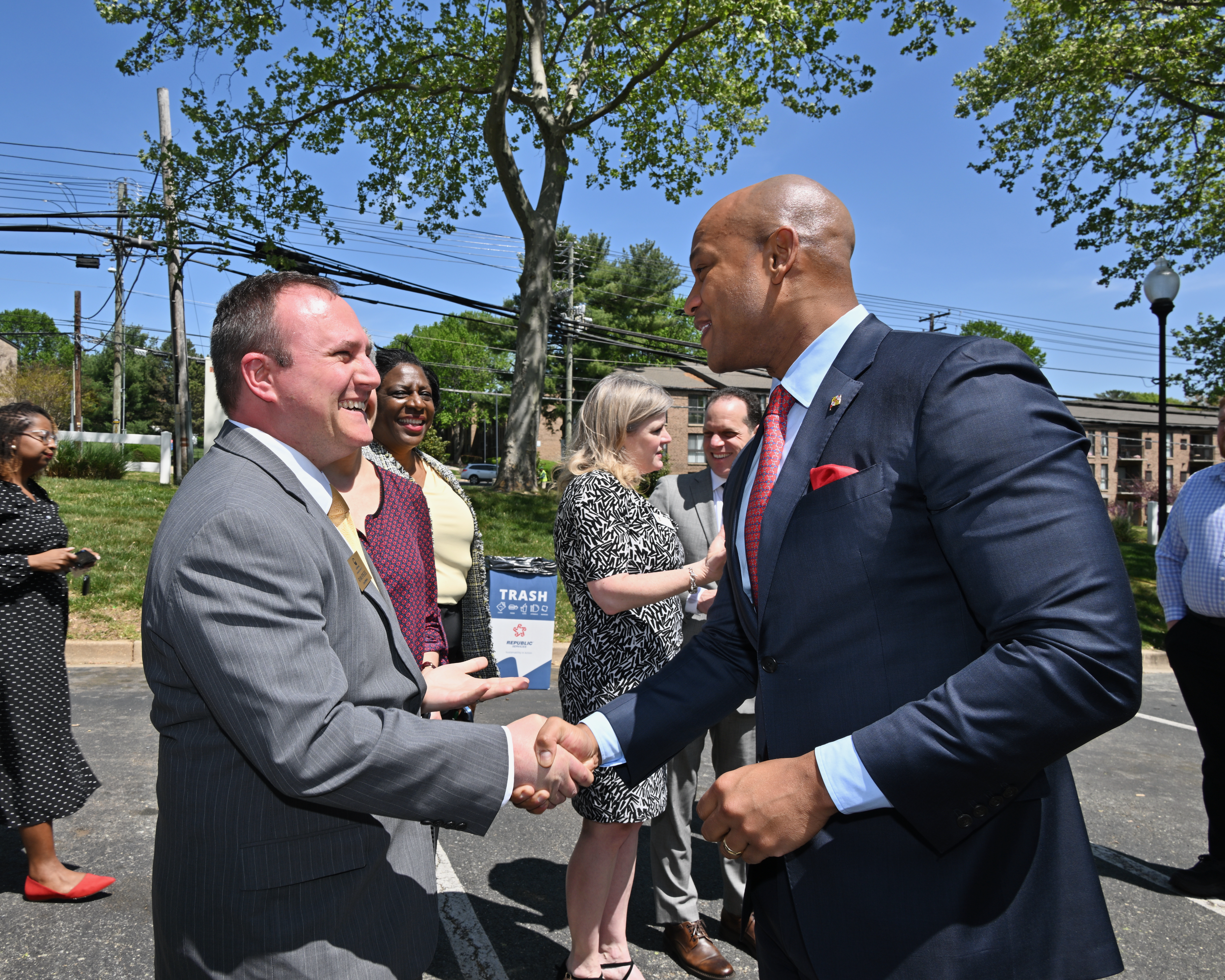
Spiegel shakes hands with Governor Wes Moore, 2023

In May 2023, following the appointment of state delegate Kumar Barve to the Maryland Public Service Commission, Spiegel applied to fill the vacancy left by his resignation in the Maryland House of Delegates. On June 12, 2023, the Montgomery County Democratic Central Committee voted to nominate Spiegel to fill the vacancy. He was sworn in on July 6, 2023. He was re-elected for his first full term on November 3, 2026.

== Political positions ==
=== Development initiatives ===
During his tenure on the Gaithersburg City Council, Spiegel supported smart growth economic development projects, including increased school construction, affordable housing, and green development.

In February 2020, Spiegel expressed frustration with but ultimately voted in favor of a bill providing WRS Inc. with a 90-day extension to buy anchor properties at Lakeforest Mall. He later voted to provide WRS Inc. with another 90-day extension in May 2020. In August 2020, Spiegel voted in favor of a maximum 12-month redevelopment moratorium on Lakeforest Mall, which he said would "prevent development from occurring that is not full-fledged to the best and highest use of the map designation area".

In July 2020, Spiegel voted against a proposal prohibiting rent increases greater than 2.6 percent during the COVID-19 pandemic, saying that he favored prohibiting all rent increases during the pandemic. In January 2022, he voted to extend renter protections until May 15, 2022.

In February 2021, Spiegel voted for an amendment to the city's zoning bill that limited where public housing could be built, which was criticized as something that could restrict affordable housing in the city. Spiegel defended the amendment from these criticisms, suggesting that it was "a bit backwards" to say it would undercut the goal of expanding affordable housing in Gaithersburg.

=== Electoral reform ===
In 2013, Spiegel voted to allow write-in candidates to participate in city elections. He later voted in 2020 to eliminate write-ins from city elections.

In January 2021, Spiegel voted against changes to the city's code of ethics that would require candidates for office to disclose conflict of interests relevant to the city. In April 2022, he sought to block a state bill that would require local governments to adopt state-level lobbyist registration standards.

=== Social issues ===
In February 2011, Spiegel said he supported legalizing same-sex marriage in Maryland, saying it was "the right thing to do from an economic standpoint".

In February 2020, Spiegel embraced criticism of Flatiron Books's rollout of American Dirt, a novel about a Mexican bookseller who is forced to flee as an illegal immigrant to the United States that was later criticized for perpetuating stereotypes about Latino immigrants, after the book was selected as part of Gaithersburg's citywide reading program. However, he warned city residents against "embracing any message of so-called cancel culture".

In June 2020, following the murder of George Floyd, Spiegel requested a review of the city's monuments to determine and remove any Confederate monuments in the Gaithersburg. Spiegel later supported renaming streets named after enslavers, including Benjamin Gaither and Frederick A. Tschiffely, in the city.

=== Taxes ===
In November 2018, Spiegel pushed for a state bill to allow Gaithersburg to levy hotel taxes at a rate of 2 percent.

== Personal life ==
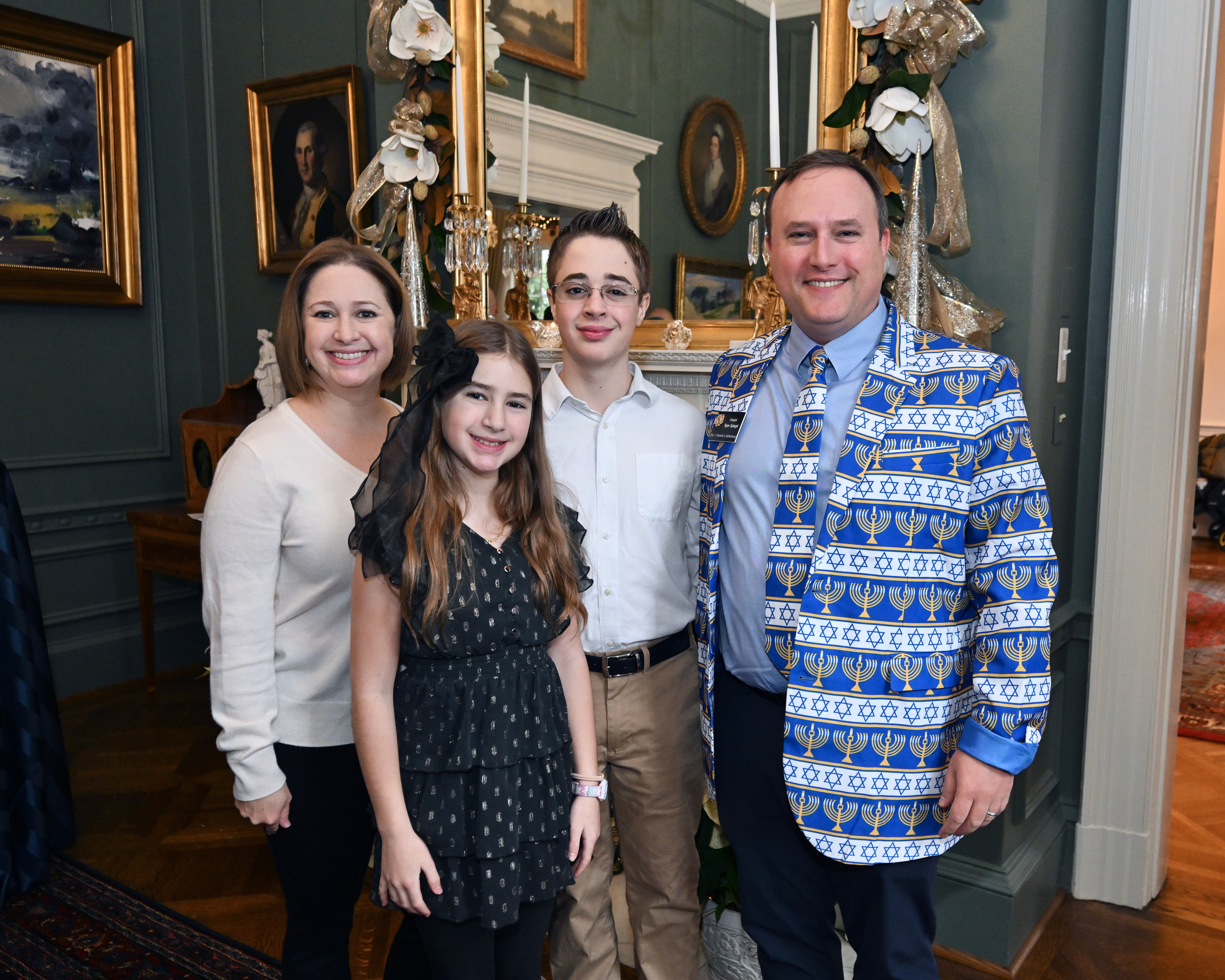
Spiegel and his family at a Hanukkah event hosted by Governor Wes Moore, 2024

Spiegel lives in the Kentlands community of Gaithersburg, Maryland. He is married to his wife, Rachael, who is a photographer specializing in bar and bat mitzvahs. Together, they have two children. He is Jewish.

== Electoral history ==
Maryland House of Delegates District 17 Democratic primary election, 2006
Party	Candidate	Votes	%
Democratic	Luiz R. S. Simmons (incumbent)	6,744	25.0
Democratic	Kumar P. Barve (incumbent)	6,439	23.9
Democratic	James W. Gilchrist	4,108	15.2
Democratic	Ryan Spiegel	3,589	13.3
Democratic	Laura Farthing Berthiaume	2,549	9.4
Democratic	Elbridge James	2,385	8.8
Democratic	Cory Siansky	1,165	4.3

Gaithersburg City Council election, 2007
Candidate	Votes	%
Cathy C. Drzyzgula	2,418	24.2
Jud Ashman	2,241	22.4
Ryan Spiegel	2,000	20.0
Carlos Solis	993	9.9
Wilson Lee Faris	982	9.8
Ahmed Ali	917	9.2
Shawn Ali	460	4.6

Gaithersburg City Council election, 2011
Candidate	Votes	%
Ryan Spiegel (incumbent)	2,156	26.6
Jud Ashman (incumbent)	1,969	24.3
Cathy Drzyzgula (incumbent)	1,856	22.9
Tom Rowse	1,134	14.0
Paula Ross	1,001	12.3

Montgomery County Council District 3 Democratic primary election, 2014
Party	Candidate	Votes	%
Democratic	Sidney A. Katz	6,089	41.0
Democratic	Tom Moore	4,920	33.1
Democratic	Ryan Spiegel	3,341	22.5
Democratic	Guled Kassim	494	3.3

Gaithersburg City Council election, 2015
Candidate	Votes	%
Ryan Spiegel (incumbent)	2,581	26.9
Robert T. Wu	2,511	26.2
Neil H. Harris	2,383	24.9
Laurie-Anne Sayles	2,105	22.0

Gaithersburg City Council election, 2019
Candidate	Votes	%
Robert T. Wu (incumbent)	2,021	37.8
Neil H. Harris (incumbent)	1,672	31.2
Ryan Spiegel (incumbent)	1,658	31.0

Maryland House of Delegates District 17 election, 2026
Candidate	Votes	%
Julie Palakovich Carr (incumbent)	11,749	32.8
Christopher S. Reed	3,477	9.7
Ryan Spiegel (incumbent)	10,263	28.6
Joe Vogel (incumbent)	10,364	28.9

== Bibliography ==
- Spiegel, Ryan (July 2, 2005). "A Salute to Justice O'Connor". The Washington Post.
- Spiegel, Ryan (March 29, 2006). "Justice for Mr. Milosevic's Victims". The Washington Post.

Maryland House of Delegates
Preceded by Kumar Barve	Member of the Maryland House of Delegates from Maryland Legislative District 17; 2023–present	Incumbent
