= S. Frank Shore =

American politician (born 1935)

Member of the Maryland Senate from the 17th district
- In office 1978–1990
- Preceded by: Charles W. Gilchrist
- Succeeded by: Mary H. Boergers

Member of the Maryland House of Delegates from the 17th district
- In office 1975–1978 Serving with Robert Anthony Jacques and Joseph E. Owens
- Preceded by: district established
- Succeeded by: Jennie M. Forehand

Member of the Maryland House of Delegates from the 1st district
- In office 1971–1974 Serving with Woodrow M. Allen, Devin J. Doolan, Laurence Levitan, S. Ruffin Maddox Jr., John S. McInerney, Donald B. Robertson
- Preceded by: Edward J. Clarke, Daniel J. Cronin, Elaine Lady, Harry W. Lerch, John S. McInerney, David A. Scott, Horace K. Whalen
- Succeeded by: new district

Personal details
- Born: December 3, 1935 (age 90) Washington, D.C., U.S.
- Party: Democratic
- Education: Southeastern University; Pennsylvania State University; American University
- Occupation: Politician; telecommunications worker

S. Frank Shore (born December 3, 1935) is a former American politician from Maryland. He served as a member of the Maryland House of Delegates from 1971 to 1978 and served as a member of the Maryland Senate from 1978 to 1990.

== Early life ==
S. Frank Shore was born on December 3, 1935, in Washington, D.C. He studied at parochial and public schools. He also studied at Southeastern University, the Labor Studied Institute at Pennsylvania State University and American University.

== Career ==
Shore is a Democrat. He served as a member of the Maryland House of Delegates. He represented the 1st district (part of Montgomery County) from 1971 to 1974. He then represented the 17th district from 1975 to 1978. He was appointed to replace Charles W. Gilchrist in the Maryland Senate in the post session of 1978. He served as a member of the senate representing the 17th district until 1990. In March 1990, Shore gave a filibuster that he described as "the Super Bowl for Life" on the senate floor against an abortion bill. In September of that year, he lost the Democratic nomination for Maryland Senate to Mary H. Boergers who supported abortion rights.

Shore served with the 4th Armored Division in the U.S. Army. He worked for the Chesapeake & Potomac Telephone Company.

== Personal life ==
Shore lives in Rockville. He is Catholic.
