= Maryland Legislative District 17 =

American legislative district

Maryland's legislative district 17
- Represents part of Montgomery County
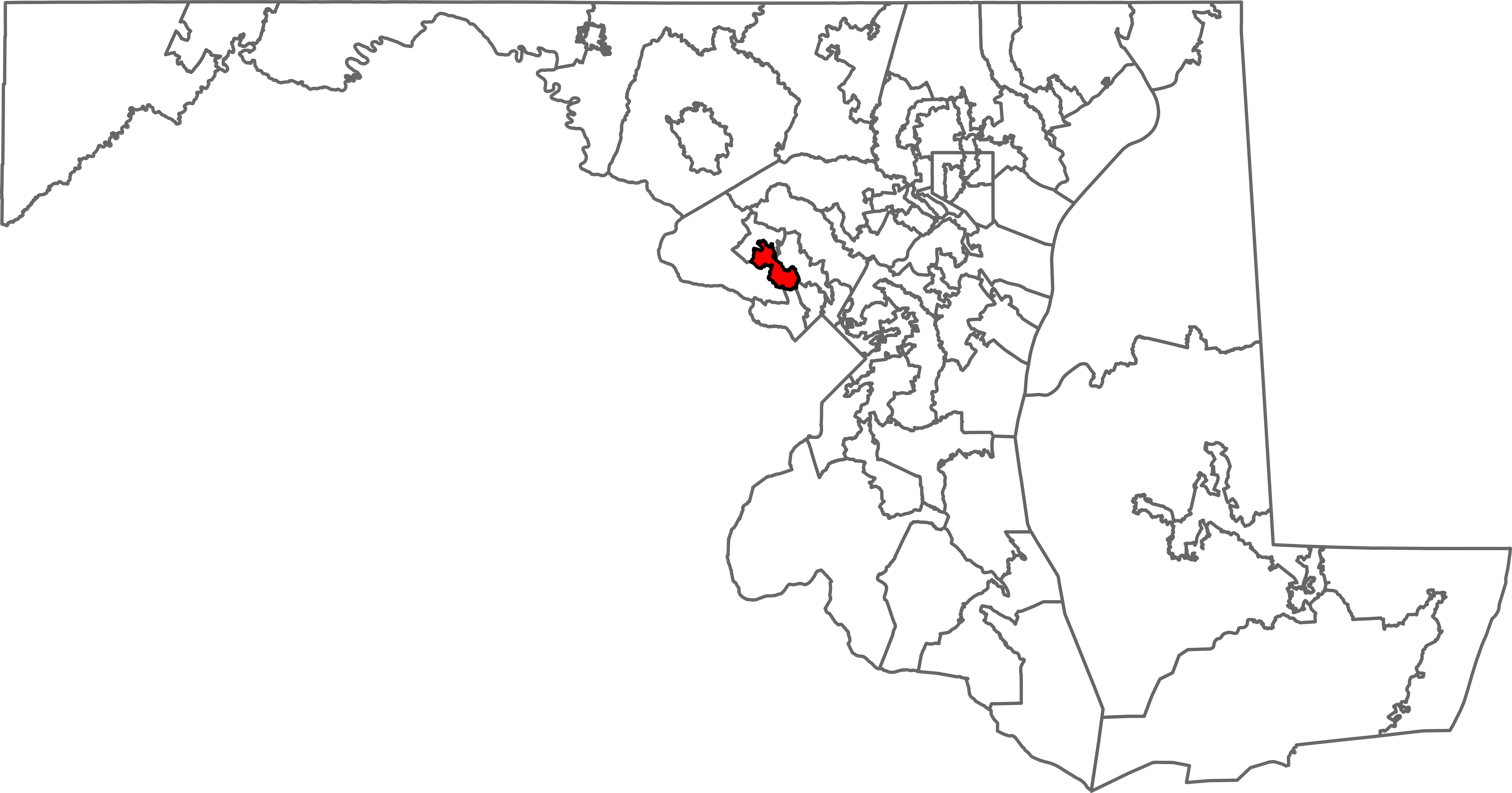
- Senator: Cheryl C. Kagan (D)
- Delegate(s): Ryan Spiegel (D); Joe Vogel (D); Julie Palakovich Carr (D)
- Registration: 59.4% Democratic; 14.9% Republican; 24.1% unaffiliated
- Demographics: 40.5% White; 14% Black/African American; 0.8% Native American; 20.2% Asian; 0.0% Hawaiian/Pacific Islander; 13.0% Other race; 11.5% Two or more races; 23.3% Hispanic
- Population (2020): 142,567
- Voting-age population: 111,177
- Registered voters: 80,488

Maryland Legislative District 17 is one of 47 districts in the state for the Maryland General Assembly. It covers part of Montgomery County. The district is represented by three delegates in the Maryland House of Delegates It includes economically and racially diverse communities, the most populous of which is Rockville, Maryland.

== Demographic characteristics ==
As of the 2020 United States census, the district had a population of 142,567, of whom 111,177 (78.0%) were of voting age. The racial makeup of the district was 57,733 (40.5%) White, 19,939 (14.0%) African American, 1,096 (0.8%) Native American, 28,795 (20.2%) Asian, 31 (0.0%) Pacific Islander, 18,519 (13.0%) from some other race, and 16,362 (11.5%) from two or more races. Hispanic or Latino of any race were 33,170 (23.3%) of the population.

The district had 80,488 registered voters as of October 17, 2020, of whom 19,436 (24.1%) were registered as unaffiliated, 11,993 (14.9%) were registered as Republicans, 47,800 (59.4%) were registered as Democrats, and 791 (1.0%) were registered to other parties.

== Political representation ==
The district is represented for the 2023–2027 legislative term in the State Senate by Cheryl C. Kagan (D) and in the House of Delegates by Ryan Spiegel (D), Joe Vogel (D) and Julie Palakovich Carr (D).

== Election history ==
Years	Senator	Party	Electoral history
January 8, 1975 – December 4, 1978	Charles W. Gilchrist	Democratic	Elected in 1974. Retired to run for Montgomery County Executive.
December 1978 – January 9, 1991	S. Frank Shore	Democratic	Appointed to serve the remainder of Gilchrist's term. Elected in 1978. Re-elected in 1982. Re-elected in 1986. Lost renomination.
January 9, 1991 – January 11, 1995	Mary H. Boergers	Democratic	Elected in 1990. Retired to run for governor.
January 11, 1995 – January 14, 2015	Jennie M. Forehand	Democratic	Elected in 1994. Re-elected in 1998. Re-elected in 2002. Re-elected in 2006. Re-elected in 2010. Retired.
January 14, 2015 – present	Cheryl Kagan	Democratic	Elected in 2014. Re-elected in 2018. Re-elected in 2022. Re-elected in 2026.

== Recent elections ==
=== 1980s ===
Maryland House of Delegates District 17 election, 1986
Party	Candidate	Votes	%
Democratic	Jennie M. Forehand (incumbent)	15,750	26
Democratic	Mary Boergers	15,562	25
Democratic	Michael R. Gordon (incumbent)	14,338	23
Republican	Matthew J. Hannon	7,848	13
Republican	Mark Allen Skinner	7,649	13
Total votes		61,147	100.00
Democratic hold			

=== 1990s ===
Maryland House of Delegates District 17 election, 1990
Party	Candidate	Votes	%
Democratic	Jennie M. Forehand (incumbent)	16,545	27
Democratic	Michael R. Gordon (incumbent)	15,552	25
Democratic	Kumar P. Barve	13,384	22
Republican	David S. Greene	8,303	14
Republican	Torin K. Andrews	7,511	12
Total votes		61,295	100.00
Democratic hold			

Maryland House of Delegates District 17 election, 1994
Party	Candidate	Votes	%
Democratic	Michael R. Gordon (incumbent)	18,154	28
Democratic	Cheryl C. Kagan	17,081	27
Democratic	Kumar P. Barve (incumbent)	15,978	25
Republican	Richard A. Marvin	12,709	20
Total votes		63,922	100.00
Democratic hold			

Maryland House of Delegates District 17 election, 1998
Party	Candidate	Votes	%
Democratic	Michael R. Gordon (incumbent)	18,805	22
Democratic	Cheryl C. Kagan (incumbent)	18,713	21
Democratic	Kumar P. Barve (incumbent)	18,617	21
Republican	Barney Gorin	11,293	13
Republican	Christopher Russell	10,078	12
Republican	Richard A. Marvin	9,534	11
Total votes		124,558	100.00
Democratic hold			

=== 2000s ===
Maryland House of Delegates District 17 election, 2002
Party	Candidate	Votes	%
Democratic	Michael R. Gordon (incumbent)	20,899	26.44
Democratic	Kumar P. Barve (incumbent)	19,697	24.92
Democratic	Luiz Simmons	19,412	24.56
Republican	Josephine J. Wang	10,002	12.65
Republican	Paul Nick Hnarakis	8,917	11.28
Write-in		122	0.15
Total votes		79,049	100.00
Democratic hold			

Maryland House of Delegates District 17 election, 2006
Party	Candidate	Votes	%
Democratic	Jim Gilchrist	23,524	25.4
Democratic	Luiz Simmons (incumbent)	22,148	23.9
Democratic	Kumar P. Barve (incumbent)	21,994	23.7
Republican	Mary Haley	9,016	9.7
Republican	Josephine J. Wang	8,384	9.0
Republican	Paul N. Hnarakis	7,535	8.1
Write-in		75	0.1
Total votes		92,676	100.00
Democratic hold			

=== 2010s ===
Maryland House of Delegates District 17 election, 2010
Party	Candidate	Votes	%
Democratic	Kumar P. Barve (incumbent)	20,720	22.9
Democratic	James Gilchrist (incumbent)	20,704	22.9
Democratic	Luiz Simmons (incumbent)	20,469	22.7
Republican	Daniel R. Campos	10,646	11.8
Republican	Craig Frick	8,945	9.9
Republican	Josephine J. Wang	8,736	9.7
Write-in		91	0.1
Total votes		90,311	100.00
Democratic hold			

Maryland House of Delegates District 17 election, 2014
Party	Candidate	Votes	%
Democratic	Kumar P. Barve (incumbent)	19,295	33.2
Democratic	Jim Gilchrist (incumbent)	19,517	33.6
Democratic	Andrew Platt	18,725	32.2
Write-in		588	1.0
Total votes		58,125	100.00
Democratic hold			

Maryland House of Delegates District 17 election, 2018
Party	Candidate	Votes	%
Democratic	Kumar P. Barve (incumbent)	32,544	30.5
Democratic	Jim Gilchrist (incumbent)	32,156	30.1
Democratic	Julie Palakovich Carr	31,508	29.5
Republican	George Ivan Hernandez	10,228	9.6
Write-in		437	0.4
Total votes		106,873	100.00
Democratic hold			

=== 2020s ===
Maryland House of Delegates District 17 election, 2022
Party	Candidate	Votes	%
Democratic	Julie Palakovich Carr (incumbent)	28,463	28.6
Democratic	Kumar P. Barve (incumbent)	27,995	28.1
Democratic	Joe Vogel	27,414	27.5
Republican	Helene F. Meister	7,835	7.9
Republican	Donald "DP" Patti	7,560	7.6
Write-in		324	0.3
Total votes		99,619	100.00
Democratic hold			

Maryland House of Delegates District 17 election, 2026
Party	Candidate	Votes	%
Democratic	TBD		
Democratic	TBD		
Democratic	TBD		
Write-in			
Total votes			
