= Woodrow M. Allen =

American politician (born 1943)

Member of the Maryland House of Delegates from the Montgomery County district
- In office 1971–1974 Serving with Devin J. Doolan, Laurence Levitan, S. Ruffin Maddox Jr., John S. McInerney, Donald B. Robertson, S. Frank Shore
- Preceded by: Edward J. Clarke, Daniel J. Cronin, Elaine Lady, Harry W. Lerch, John S. McInerney, David A. Scott, Horace K. Whalen
- Succeeded by: district changed

Personal details
- Born: February 28, 1943 Eau Claire, Wisconsin, U.S.
- Party: Democratic
- Spouse: Leigh Donnelley
- Education: Georgetown University (AB); American University (AM)
- Occupation: Politician; consultant

Woodrow M. Allen (born February 28, 1943) is a former American politician from Maryland. He served as a member of the Maryland House of Delegates, representing Montgomery County from 1971 to 1974.

== Early life ==
Woodrow M. Allen was born on February 28, 1943, in Eau Claire, Wisconsin, to Joseph N. Allen. He attended parochial schools in Eau Claire. He graduated from Regis High School in 1961. He graduated with a Bachelor of Arts from Georgetown University in 1965. He graduated with a Master of Arts from American University in 1967. While in college, Allen worked under Gaylord Nelson and volunteered for Senator Ted Kennedy.

== Career ==
Allen was a Democrat. He served as a member of the Maryland House of Delegates, representing Montgomery County from 1971 to 1974. He worked on the campaigns of John F. Kennedy and Robert Kennedy.

As of 1970, he was director of public information and a congressional relations officer for World Federalists and the Coalition on National Priorities. He was a member of the Maryland Service Corps.

== Personal life ==
Allen married Leigh Donnelley of Maryland. He lives in Bethesda.
