= Julie Palakovich Carr =

American politician (born 1983)

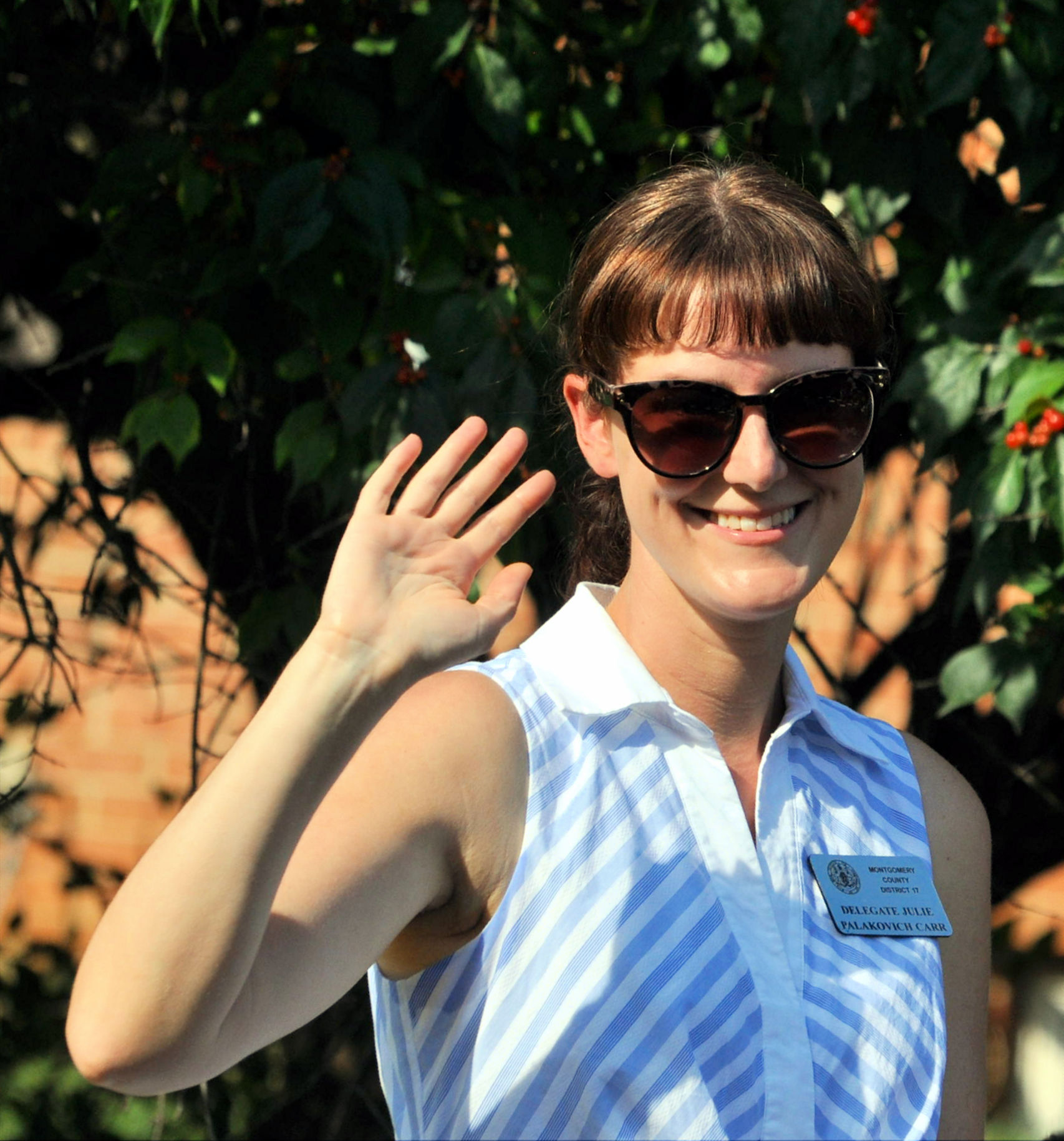
- Palakovich Carr in 2021

Member of the Maryland House of Delegates from the 17th district
- Incumbent
- Assumed office January 9, 2019 Serving with Ryan Spiegel and Joe Vogel
- Preceded by: Andrew Platt

Personal details
- Born: Julie Anne Palakovich; April 22, 1983 (age 43) Harrisburg, Pennsylvania, U.S.
- Party: Democratic
- Spouse: Eric Palakovich Carr (m. 2007)
- Children: 1
- Education: Boston University (BA); University of Minnesota (MS)

Julie Palakovich Carr (born April 22, 1983) is an American politician who has served as a member of the Maryland House of Delegates representing the 17th district in Montgomery County since 2019. A member of the Democratic Party, she served on the Rockville City Council from 2013 to 2018.

== Early life and education ==
Julie Anne Palakovich was born in Harrisburg, Pennsylvania on April 22, 1983. She graduated from Mechanicsburg Area Senior High School in 2001, afterwards attending Boston University, where she earned a Bachelor of Arts degree in biology in 2005, and the University of Minnesota, where she earned a master's degree in biology in 2007.

== Career ==
Before holding elected office, Palakovich Carr served on several city task forces, including serving two terms on the Environment Commission, chairing the Adequate Public Facilities Ordinance (APFO) Review Committee, serving as vice chair of the City Services and Budget Work Group, and chairing the Watersheds Committee. In addition to her elected career, Palakovich Carr worked for a decade in science policy, including as public policy manager for the American Institute of Biological Sciences. She also co-founded a political technology startup, Victory Guide, that helps candidates run for local office.

=== Rockville City Council ===
In November 2013, at the age of 29, she became the youngest woman ever elected to the Rockville City Council. She was re-elected in 2015 and served until early 2019. She was council liaison to the Animal Matters Board, Environment Commission, Human Rights Commission, and Traffic and Transportation Commission. During her two terms, Palakovich Carr sponsored successful legislation to make Rockville a sanctuary city, ban smoking in outdoor dining areas, strengthen the city's animal cruelty laws, and create a water conservation program for seniors and low-income families.

=== Maryland House of Delegates ===
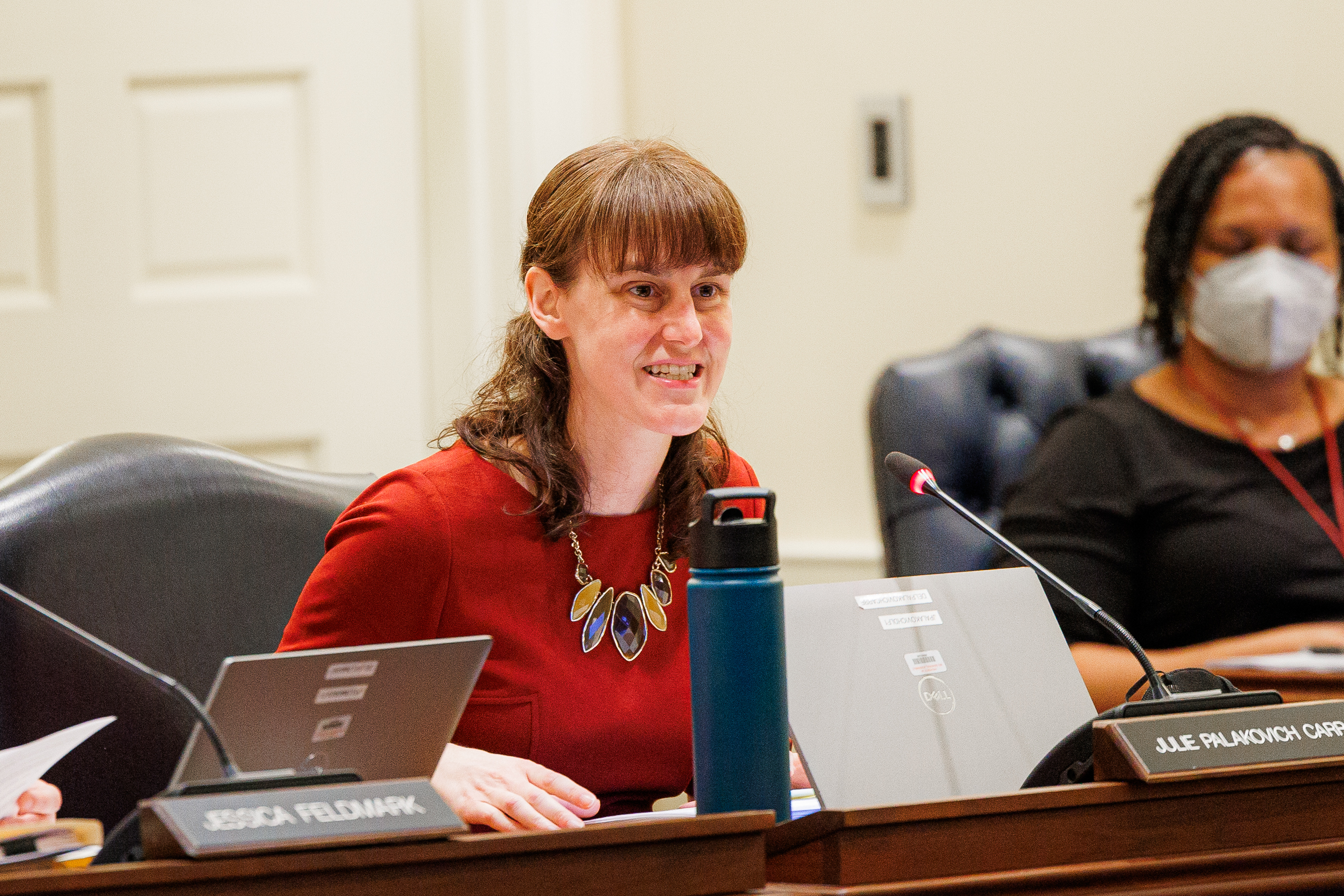
Palakovich Carr in the Ways and Means Committee, 2024

On July 6, 2017, Palakovich Carr announced that she would run for the Maryland House of Delegates in District 17. Had she lost the Democratic primary, she would have been eligible to run for re-election on the Rockville City Council. After incumbent Delegate Andrew Platt announced that he would not seek re-election in the 2018 elections, Delegates Kumar Barve and James W. Gilchrist formed a slate with Palakovich Carr in advance of the Democratic primary elections. She won the primary election with 24.7 percent of the vote, and later won the general election with 29.5 percent of the vote. After winning the general election, she resigned from the Rockville city council.

Palakovich Carr was sworn in as a member of the House of Delegates on January 9, 2019. She is a member of the Ways and Means Committee and the Joint Audit and Evaluation Committee, and a member of the Maryland Legislative Transit Caucus, the Women Legislators of Maryland, and the Maryland Legislative Latino Caucus.

== Political positions ==
=== Electoral reform ===
During the 2019 legislative session, Palakovich Carr introduced legislation that would replace absentee ballots with vote-by-mail ballots.

During the 2020 legislative session, Palakovich Carr and Dana Stein introduced legislation that would allow gubernatorial candidates to pick their running mates after the primary election. The bill passed the House of Delegates by a vote of 96-41.

During the 2021 legislative session, Palakovich Carr introduced legislation that would expand a law that allows voters to receive paid time off to vote in elections to cover early voting. The bill passed the House of Delegates by a vote of 91-38.

During the 2022 legislative session, Palakovich Carr introduced legislation that would ban lobbyists from contributing from their own personal funds to statewide candidates to influence the actions of these elected officials.

=== National politics ===
In December 2019, Palakovich Carr attended and spoke at a rally in Gaithersburg, Maryland supporting the first impeachment of Donald Trump.

=== Social issues ===
In July 2019, the Maryland State Board of Elections began allowing voters to choose "X" or "unspecified" as a gender on their voter registration after Palakovich Carr wrote to election officials asking them to consider making the corresponding change.

During the 2021 legislative session, Palakovich Carr introduced legislation to ban the use of gay panic defense in criminal court proceedings. The bill passed and went into effect without Governor Larry Hogan's signature.

=== Taxes ===
During the 2019 legislative session, Palakovich Carr introduced and passed legislation that allows the cities of Rockville and Gaithersburg to levy a hotel tax on rental services. She also voted for legislation that would impose fees on tax-capped country club properties in Montgomery County, which failed to pass in an 11-13 vote.

During the 2020 legislative session, Palakovich Carr introduced a tax reform proposal that would require combined reporting for multi-state corporations, eliminate tax credit and subsidy programs, lower the state's estate tax exemption limit to $1 million, and restructure tax brackets for those earning more or less than the state median.

During the 2021 legislative session, Palakovich Carr introduced legislation to extend the state's earned income tax credit to Individual Taxpayer Identification Number filers. The bill passed and became law without Governor Hogan's signature on March 9, 2021.

She also introduced legislation to allow counties to impose progressive income taxes on a bracket basis, which passed but was vetoed by Governor Hogan on May 28, 2021. The General Assembly voted to override the governor's veto during the 2021 special legislative session.

== Personal life ==
Palakovich married Eric Carr in 2007 in Duluth, Minnesota. Together, they have a son.

== Electoral history ==
Rockville City Council Election, 2013
Candidate	Votes	%
Julie Palakovich Carr	4,308	18.7%
Virginia Onley	4,063	17.6%
Tom Moore	4,035	17.5%
Beryl L. Feinberg	3,698	16.0%
Donald H. (Don) Hadley	3,610	15.6%
Clarie Marcuccio Whitaker	3,167	13.7%
Write-Ins	210	0.9%

Rockville City Council Election, 2015
Candidate	Votes	%
Beryl L. Feinberg	3,448	14.4%
Julie Palakovich Carr	2,998	12.5%
Mark Pierzchala	2,799	11.7%
Virginia Onley	2,752	11.5%
Richard Gottfried	2,457	10.2%
Patrick Schoof	2,425	10.1%
Brigitta Mullican	2,415	10.1%
David Hill	2,353	9.8%
Clark Reed	2,283	9.5%
Write-In Votes	77	0.3%

Maryland House of Delegates District 17 Democratic Primary Election, 2018
Party	Candidate	Votes	%
Democratic	Kumar P. Barve	8,554	25.9%
Democratic	Julie Palakovich Carr	8,143	24.7%
Democratic	James W. Gilchrist	6,704	20.3%
Democratic	Julian Haffner	4,384	13.3%
Democratic	Rebecca Smondrowski	3,551	10.8%
Democratic	Esam Al-Shareffi	1,678	5.1%

Maryland House of Delegates District 17 General Election, 2018
Party	Candidate	Votes	%
Democratic	Kumar P. Barve	32,544	30.5%
Democratic	James W. Gilchrist	32,156	30.1%
Democratic	Julie Palakovich Carr	31,508	29.5%
Republican	George Ivan Hernandez	10,228	9.6%
N/A	Other Write-Ins	437	0.4%

Maryland House of Delegates
Preceded by Andrew Platt	Member of the Maryland House of Delegates from Maryland Legislative District 17; 2019–present	Incumbent
