= Joe Vogel (politician) =

American politician (born 1997)

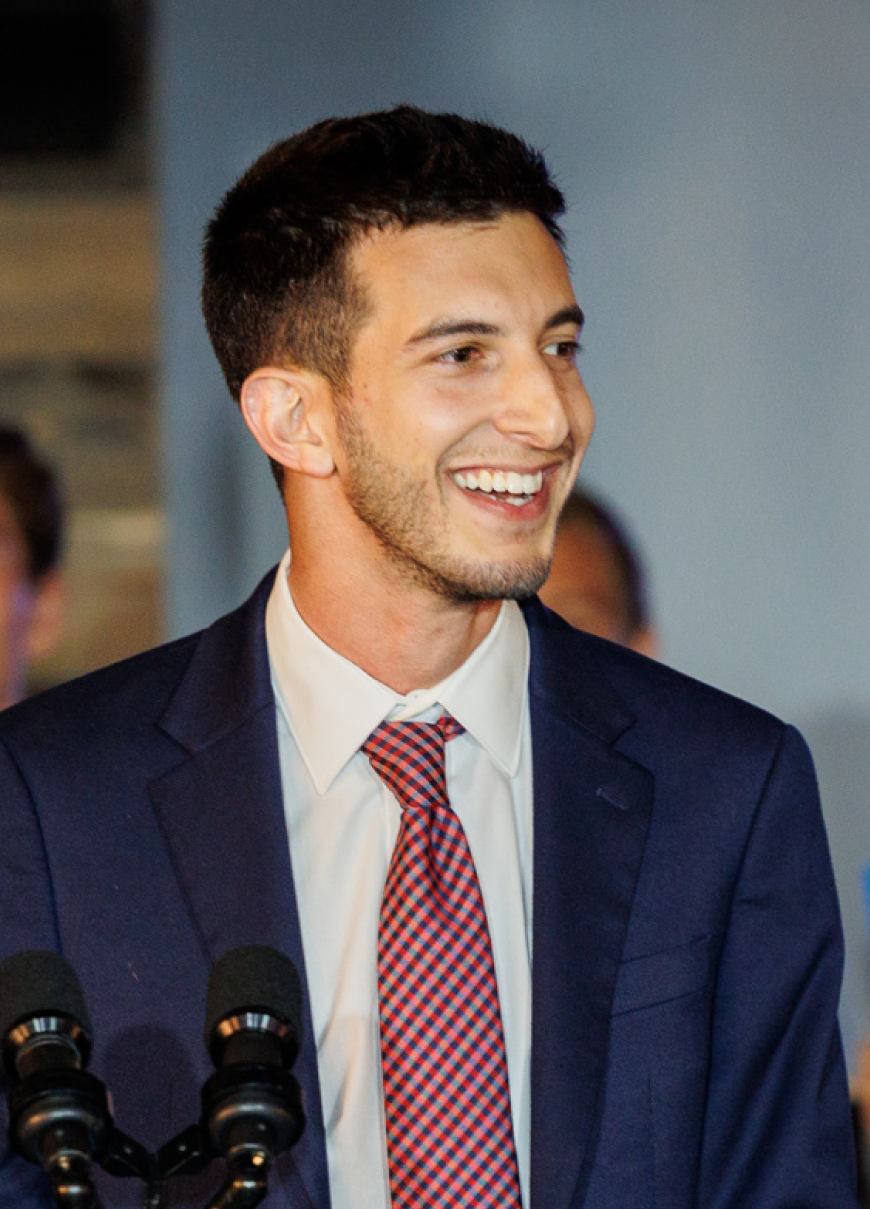
- Vogel in 2024

Member of the Maryland House of Delegates from the 17th district
- Incumbent
- Assumed office January 11, 2023 Serving with Julie Palakovich Carr and Ryan Spiegel
- Preceded by: James W. Gilchrist

Personal details
- Born: Joseph Vogel; January 4, 1997 (age 29) Montevideo, Uruguay
- Citizenship: Uruguay; United States (since 2016)
- Party: Democratic
- Education: George Washington University (BA); Harvard University (MPP)
- Website: Campaign website Official website

Joseph Vogel (born January 4, 1997) is an Uruguay-born American politician who has served as a member of the Maryland House of Delegates from District 17 since 2023. A member of the Democratic Party, his district includes the Montgomery County cities of Gaithersburg and Rockville; he represents the district alongside fellow Democratic delegates Julie Palakovich Carr and Ryan Spiegel.

In May 2023, Vogel announced that he would run for the U.S. House of Representatives in Maryland's 6th congressional district. He was defeated in the Democratic primary on May 14, 2024, placing second behind April McClain Delaney.

== Early life and education ==
Vogel was born in Montevideo, Uruguay on January 4, 1997, into the Uruguayan Jewish family of David Vogel and Gabriela Roitman. His ancestors immigrated there before the Holocaust. His father, David Vogel, worked as an advisor to the Uruguayan government. He immigrated to the United States with his family when he was three years old due to his father's job at the International Monetary Fund. His family settled in Rockville, Maryland, upon immigrating to the United States. He became a U.S. citizen in November 2016.

Vogel attended Charles E. Smith Jewish Day School. He was also active in Lantos AZA, a chapter in the Jewish youth group, BBYO. Vogel has said this is what motivated him to pursue a career in politics. He later attended George Washington University, where he earned a bachelor's degree in political science in 2018. Following this, he went on to Harvard University where he earned a master's in public policy at the Harvard Kennedy School in 2022.

While a student at George Washington University, Vogel served as an at-large member of the Student Association Senate, but was impeached for violating its attendance policy by missing four meetings in January 2018 due to his involvement with Ralph Northam's 2017 gubernatorial campaign in Virginia.

== Career ==
=== Early career ===
Vogel developed an interest in politics while in school, where he had been active in student government. He volunteered on Barack Obama's 2012 presidential campaign and later worked on Cheryl Kagan's 2014 State Senate campaign. After graduating from Charles E. Smith Jewish Day School, Vogel embarked on a trip to Israel, and worked as a contributing author for The Times of Israel.

Vogel was a college intern for then-House Minority Leader Nancy Pelosi and then-Senate Minority Leader Chuck Schumer.

Vogel took a year off of college at George Washington University to work on the national advance team of Hillary Clinton's 2016 presidential campaign. He later got involved in the March for Our Lives movement and in protests against the Supreme Court nomination of Brett Kavanaugh, and worked as an advance lead for Ralph Northam's 2017 gubernatorial campaign and as advance director for Cory Booker's 2020 presidential campaign. After Booker suspended his campaign, he worked the presidential campaigns of Michael Bloomberg and Joe Biden.

Vogel served on the Maryland Youth Advisory Council from 2015 to 2016. He also worked as a policy fellow at Interfaith Works in Montgomery County and founded Learn It Together, a nonprofit organization to help students of essential workers as they transitioned to remote learning during the COVID-19 pandemic.

=== Maryland House of Delegates ===
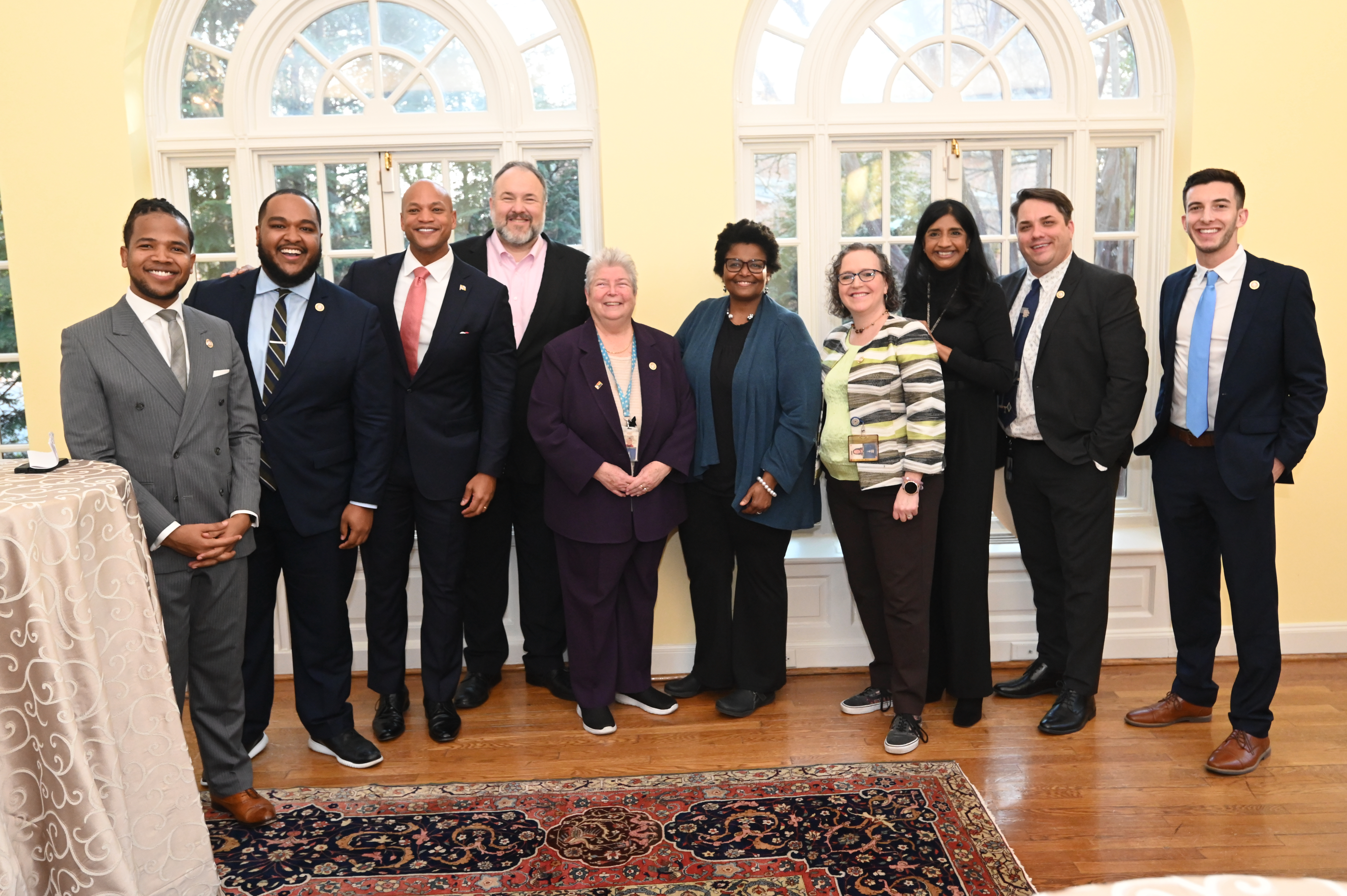
Vogel (far right) and other members of the LGBTQ+ Caucus with Governor Wes Moore, 2023

In September 2021, Vogel announced he would run for the Maryland House of Delegates, challenging incumbent Democratic state delegate James W. Gilchrist, who later announced his retirement; Kagan, who had political differences with Gilchrest, recruited Vogel to run for the seat. During the primary, Vogel strategized with Connecticut state senator Will Haskell and hosted campaign events featuring Cory Booker. He won the Democratic primary with 27.9% of the vote and defeated Republican challengers Helene Meister and Donald Patti in the general election with 27.5% of the vote.

Vogel was sworn into the Maryland House of Delegates on January 11, 2023. He represents District 17, which includes the cities of Gaithersburg and Rockville. Vogel and Jeffrie Long Jr. are the first Generation Z members of the Maryland General Assembly. He is a member of the House Ways and Means Committee. Vogel served as a deputy majority whip for the Maryland House of Delegates from 2026 to 2027, afterwards serving as assistant majority leader.

=== 2024 congressional campaign ===
In May 2023, Vogel announced he would run for the U.S. House of Representatives in Maryland's 6th congressional district to succeed David Trone, who was running for the United States Senate in 2024 to succeed retiring Democratic senator Ben Cardin. If elected, he would have been the first Latino, first Gen Z, and first openly LGBTQ member of Congress from Maryland.

Vogel was seen as a frontrunner, alongside former National Telecommunications and Information Administration deputy administrator April McClain Delaney, in the Democratic primary, during which he received endorsements from various national groups and local officials, and ran on a platform including support for Deferred Action for Childhood Arrivals (DACA) recipients and LGBT rights, expanding health care access, addressing climate change, and fighting right wing extremism. Vogel's campaign also focused on his legislative record and political activism toward abortion rights and gun control, as well as identity politics.

Vogel was defeated by McClain Delaney in the Democratic primary election on May 14, 2024, placing second with 26.3 percent of the vote. He conceded defeat that night and endorsed McClain Delaney in the general election.

== Political positions ==
During his House of Delegates campaign, Vogel ran on a platform that included climate, mental health, and economic issues. He has described himself as a "pragmatic progressive" and cited Cory Booker, Ritchie Torres, and Jared Moskowitz as his political role models.

=== Education ===
Vogel supports making public colleges tuition-free, codifying President Joe Biden's cancellation of up to $20,000 in student loan debt into law, and increasing state education funding. During the 2023 legislative session, he introduced a bill to forgive up to $30,000 in student debt for mental health professionals employed at Maryland public schools. During the 2024 legislative session, Vogel supported a bill to create a statewide health education framework. In June 2025, he criticized the U.S. Supreme Court's ruling in Mahmoud v. Taylor, which overturned Montgomery County Public Schools's policy of not allowing opt-outs for instruction involving LGBTQ-inclusive storybooks, saying that the decision aims to "erase" members of the LGBTQ community.

=== Electoral reform ===
Vogel opposes partisan gerrymandering. In August 2025, amid Republican efforts to redraw Texas's congressional districts to gain five congressional seats in the 2026 United States House of Representatives elections, Vogel said he would support a bill that would allow Maryland to redraw its congressional districts if any other state redrew theirs outside of the regular decennial census period, but expressed concern that a "nationwide battle around redistricting" could lead to further political polarization in the United States.

In December 2025, Vogel said that he planned to introduce a bill during the 2026 legislative session to ban committee dinners, which are informal meals where members of a legislative committee meet with lobbyists or executives to discuss legislative issues outside of formal hearings.

=== Environment ===
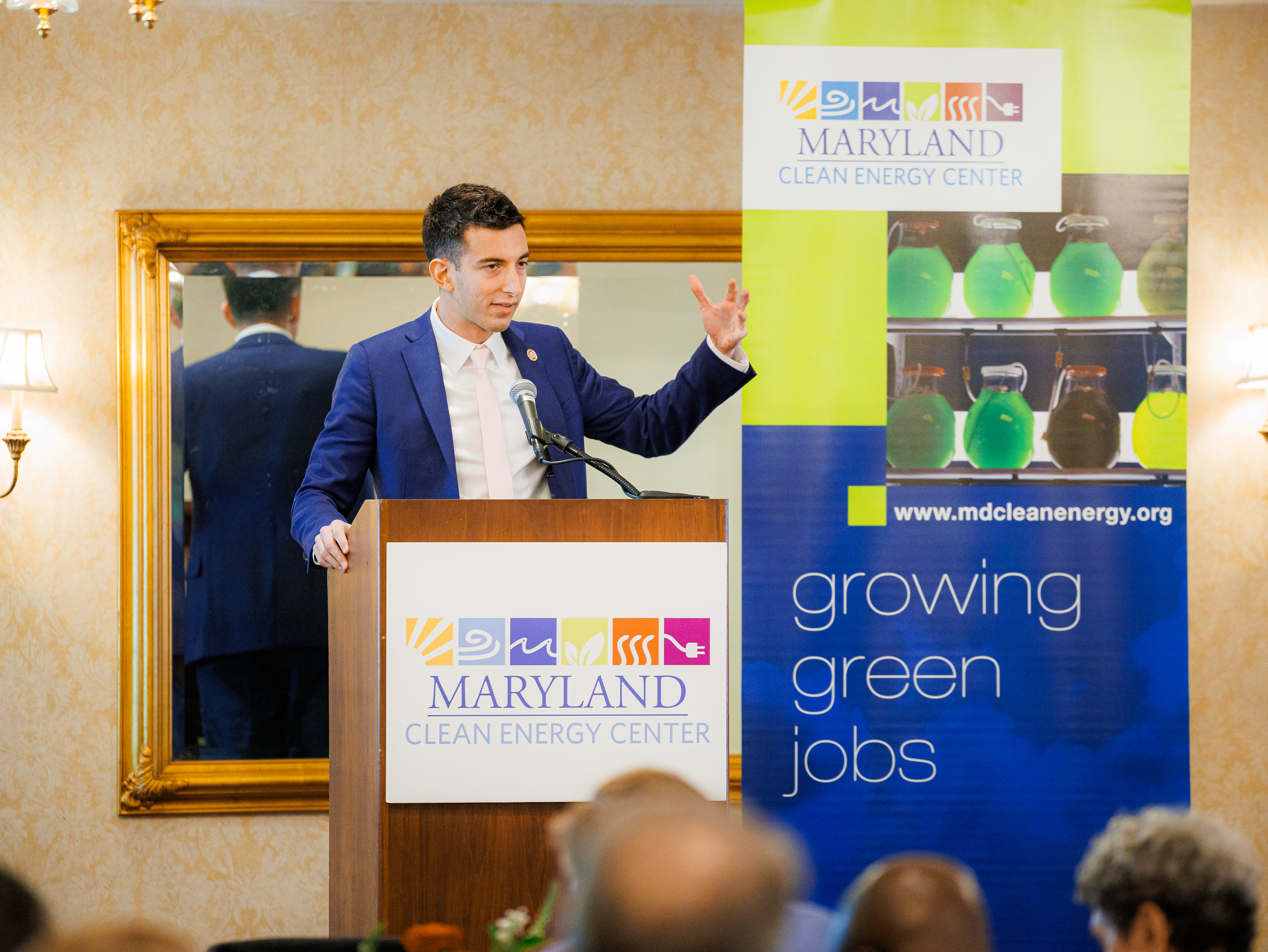
Vogel speaks at a Maryland Clean Energy Center legislative reception, 2025

During the 2023 legislative session, Vogel introduced legislation to provide funding for climate startups.

=== Foreign policy ===
==== China ====
During his 2024 congressional campaign, Vogel cited strategic competition with China as the United States' top foreign policy challenge and called for strengthening supply chains, investing in emerging technologies, and promoting freedom of navigation to counter it. He also supported working with China to reduce global greenhouse gas emissions.

==== Israel ====
Vogel describes himself as an "outspoken supporter of Israel". He supports a two-state solution to the Israeli–Palestinian conflict and does not support conditioning U.S. foreign aid on Israeli actions. He supports the working definition of antisemitism promoted by the International Holocaust Remembrance Alliance, stating in an interview with Jewish Insider that he accepts "fair criticism of the Israeli government", but views the "delegitimization and demonization" of Israel as antisemitic.

While a member of the GWU Student Association Senate, Vogel opposed a student government resolution encouraging the university to divest from companies accused of violating Palestinian human rights. The Senate voted to reject the resolution by a vote of 14–15, with one abstention, in May 2017. After Vogel was impeached from the GWU Student Association Senate for missing four consecutive meetings in violation of its attendance policy in 2018, he accused three of its members of being "closely aligned with the Boycott, Divestment and Sanctions movement" and of launching an effort to kick him out of the Senate following his efforts against the pro-Palestinian divestment resolution. In March 2018, after one of the three senators, Brady Forrest, was accused of antisemitism after old Facebook posts resurfaced showing Forrest calling for a boycott of a campus event sponsored by Jewish student groups that he claimed supported the 2014 Gaza War, Vogel drafted a letter signed by nearly 70 student leaders calling for Forrest's resignation. He spoke out against members of the Student Association Senate for failing to censure Forrest in April 2018.

In May 2023, Vogel said he supported the protests against proposed judicial reforms in Israel.

In October 2023, amid the 2023 Hamas-led attack on Israel and subsequent Gaza war, Vogel said he would support increasing the U.S. military presence in the region to deter future conflicts and called on Congress to provide Israel and Palestine with monetary support to help Israel defend itself and to assist with humanitarian efforts in Palestine. He also criticized activist groups Jewish Voice for Peace and IfNotNow as "fringe organizations" after they released statements accusing Israel of provoking the war, and cosigned a letter with other congressional candidates supporting President Joe Biden's actions toward the war. Vogel criticized calls for an unconditional ceasefire in the conflict, saying that any bilateral ceasefire must come with the release of all Hamas-held hostages and increased flow of humanitarian aid into the Gaza Strip, but added that he supported U.S. calls for restraint and civilian protections in Israeli attacks. He called for the removal of Israeli Prime Minister Benjamin Netanyahu in March 2024, saying that peace could not be achieved in Israel with him in office. He also expressed concerns with President Biden's decision to withhold military aid to Israel amid its invasion of Rafah, but ultimately conceded that he trusted the president's judgement.

In November 2023, Vogel called for the resignation of Zainab Chaudry, the director of the state Council on American–Islamic Relations chapter, from the state Commission on Hate Crime Response and Prevention after making Facebook posts comparing Israel to Nazi Germany and calling attendees of the March for Israel "genocide sympathizers". Chaudry was suspended from the commission by Attorney General Anthony Brown the following day. During the 2024 legislative session, after Chaudry was reinstated to the board in December 2023, Vogel introduced legislation to remove Chaudry from the board and replace her with "two members of the Muslim community" and another bill allowing for the removal of commission and task force members for "misconduct, incompetence, neglect of duties, or other good cause".

=== Gun policy ===
Following the Sandy Hook Elementary School shooting, Vogel advocated for gun control. During his House of Delegates campaign, he said he supports legislation to hold gunmakers liable for school shootings; he also said he supports banning privately made firearms, increasing funding for violence prevention programs, and requiring gun owners to have liability insurance.

=== Health care ===
Vogel supports Medicare for All but opposes making people give up their private insurance plans and prohibiting health care companies from covering procedures covered by Medicare.

Vogel supports increasing funding for drug intervention and treatment programs. During the 2023 legislative session, he introduced the Josh Siems Act, which would require emergency rooms to include fentanyl testing in toxicology screens. The bill was named for Baltimore native Josh Siems, who died from a fentanyl overdose on his 31st birthday in 2022. The bill unanimously passed the Maryland General Assembly and was signed into law by Governor Wes Moore.

During the 2024 legislative session, Vogel introduced a bill to give state employees four hours of leave for cancer screenings and another that would allow students to possess and administer Narcan.

=== Immigration ===
During his 2024 congressional campaign, Vogel expressed support for efforts to support DREAMers and DACA recipients. He supports the American Dream and Promise Act, which would codify provisions of the DACA program into law.

=== Social issues ===
During the 2023 legislative session, Vogel introduced a bill to establish a commission on hate crime response and prevention following an uptick in hateful acts in Montgomery County, which was signed into law by Governor Moore. He also introduced the Event-Goer Rights and Accountable Sales (ERAS) Act following the 2022 Ticketmaster controversy, which requires ticket issuers to enforce a ticket refund policy and ban restrictions on ticket resales and transfers.

During his 2024 congressional campaign, Vogel supported the Equality Act, the Protecting the Right to Organize Act, and the Women's Health Protection Act.

During the 2024 legislative session, Vogel introduced a bill that would require police to notify property owners to remove hateful graffiti from their properties. He also spoke against proposed bills to ban transgender students from competing on girls' sports teams in schools and another that would ban sexually explicit materials from school libraries, saying that the introduction of both would be "detrimental" to the trans community, and supported a bill to prohibit school boards from banning books in school libraries. In March 2024, Vogel voted against a bill that would legalize online gambling in Maryland, believing that it would not bring in additional revenue for the state and that it would hurt casino workers.

In February 2026, Vogel said that he supported universal childcare in Maryland.

=== Taxes ===
During the 2023 legislative session, Vogel introduced a bill to provide tax credits to Maryland-based news media outlets with fewer than 50 employees for advertising costs. In April 2026, after The Baltimore Banner reported that Maryland hospitals were setting up offshore, for-profit insurance companies instead of buying policies from traditional commercial insurers to avoid paying Maryland's captive insurance tax, Vogel opposed a bill that would impose a two-year moratorium on the captive insurance tax.

== Personal life ==
Vogel lives in Gaithersburg, Maryland. He is Jewish and openly gay.

Vogel is trilingual; he speaks English, Spanish, and Hebrew.

== Electoral history ==
Maryland House of Delegates District 17 Democratic primary election, 2022
Party	Candidate	Votes	%
Democratic	Julie Palakovich Carr (incumbent)	11,058	31.7
Democratic	Kumar P. Barve (incumbent)	10,324	29.6
Democratic	Joe Vogel	9,745	27.9
Democratic	Joe De Maria	3,770	10.8

Maryland House of Delegates District 17 election, 2022
Party	Candidate	Votes	%
Democratic	Julie Palakovich Carr (incumbent)	28,463	28.6
Democratic	Kumar P. Barve (incumbent)	27,995	28.1
Democratic	Joe Vogel	27,414	27.5
Republican	Helene F. Meister	7,835	7.9
Republican	Donald "DP" Patti	7,560	7.6
Write-in		324	0.3

Maryland's 6th congressional district Democratic primary results, 2024
Party	Candidate	Votes	%
Democratic	April McClain Delaney	22,985	40.4
Democratic	Joe Vogel	14,940	26.3
Democratic	Ashwani Jain	4,750	8.3
Democratic	Tekesha Martinez	3,992	7.0
Democratic	Lesley Lopez	2,600	4.6
Democratic	Laurie-Anne Sayles	1,845	3.2
Democratic	Destiny Drake West	1,086	1.9
Democratic	Mohammad Mozumder	1,005	1.7
Democratic	Joel Martin Rubin (withdrawn)	820	1.4
Democratic	Peter Choharis (withdrawn)	818	1.4
Democratic	Geoffrey Grammer (withdrawn)	651	1.1
Democratic	George Gluck	437	0.8
Democratic	Kiambo White	401	0.7
Democratic	Stephen McDow (withdrawn)	246	0.4
Democratic	Altimont Wilks	179	0.3
Democratic	Adrian Petrus	166	0.3

Maryland House of Delegates
Preceded by James W. Gilchrist	Member of the Maryland House of Delegates from Maryland Legislative District 17; 2023–present	Incumbent
