= William Wampler =

William Wampler may refer to:

- William C. Wampler (1926–2012), U.S. Representative from Virginia
- William C. Wampler Jr. (born 1959), member of the Senate of Virginia
- Will Wampler (William Creed Wampler III, born 1991), member of the Virginia House of Delegates
- Bill Wampler, American basketball player
