= Cheryl Kagan =

American politician (born 1961)

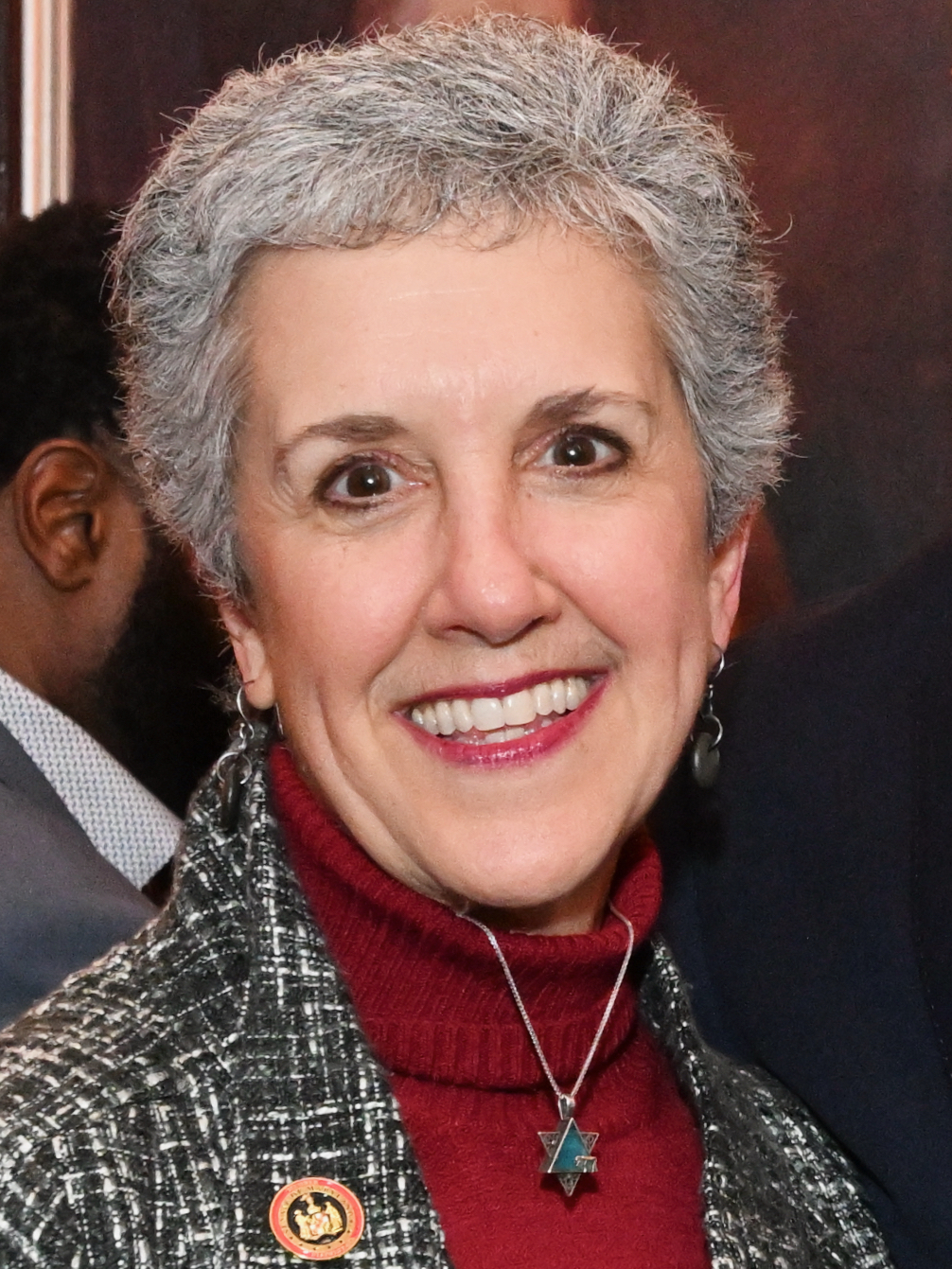
- Kagan in 2024

Member of the Maryland Senate from the 17th district
- Incumbent
- Assumed office January 14, 2015
- Preceded by: Jennie M. Forehand

Member of the Maryland House of Delegates from the 17th district
- In office January 11, 1995 – January 8, 2003
- Preceded by: Jennie M. Forehand
- Succeeded by: Luiz R. S. Simmons

Personal details
- Born: July 2, 1961 (age 65) Washington, D.C., U.S.
- Party: Democratic
- Spouse: David Spitzer (m. 2000, divorced)
- Education: Vassar College (AB)
- Website: cherylkagan.org
- Kagan's voice Cheryl Kagan on the 2025 Scrabble Players Championship. Recorded August 8, 2025

Cheryl C. Kagan (born July 2, 1961) is an American politician who has served as a member of the Maryland Senate representing District 17 since 2015. A member of the Democratic Party, she previously represented the district in the Maryland House of Delegates from 1995 to 2003.

== Early life and education ==
Kagan was born in Washington, D.C. on July 2, 1961. She graduated from Winston Churchill High School and later attended the Washington Semester program at American University in 1981, and Vassar College, where she earned a Bachelor of Arts degree in political science in 1983. Kagan also pursued graduate study at the University of Maryland, College Park from 1991 to 1995.

== Career ==
Kagan spent the summer after her freshman year at Vassar working in Washington, D.C. as a member of U.S. Senator Ted Kennedy's presidential campaign staff in 1980. After graduating from Vassar, she worked for three months at the Brookings Institution, before working for U.S. Senator Alan Cranston's presidential campaign during the 1984 United States presidential election. Afterwards, Kagan worked as a PAC and Legislative Assistant for the National Abortion Rights Action League (NARAL) from 1984 to 1985.

During the mid-1980s, Kagan began her work as an independent political and marketing consultant to candidates and nonprofits, which she continues to do today. Candidates she has advised include Maryland delegate Joe Vogel.

Kagan worked as the director of development for the National Women's Political Caucus from 1986 to 1987. From 1989 to 1991, she worked as an executive director for the Independent Action PAC, afterwards working as the chief of staff to U.S. Representative John W. Cox Jr. from 1991 to 1992. In 1991 and 1993, Kagan was a lobbyist for the Brady Center to Prevent Gun Violence, where she helped pass the Brady Handgun Violence Prevention Act and the Federal Assault Weapons Ban.

During her first term in the Maryland House of Delegates, Kagan worked as a substitute teacher for Montgomery County Public Schools. After retiring from the House of Delegates, she worked as an executive director for the Carl M. Freeman Foundation until 2007, when she became a professor at Montgomery College until 2009. Kagan worked as the executive director for the Americans for Democratic Action's education fund from 2010 to 2012, and afterwards worked as the director of community engagement for BBYO's mid-atlantic chapter.

Kagan served as the co-chair, and later as a Montgomery County delegate, for John Kerry's 2004 presidential campaign. She later served on the steering committee of Hillary Clinton's 2008 presidential campaign. Kagan observed the Iowa caucuses in 2008, 2012, and 2020.

== In the legislature ==
=== Maryland House of Delegates ===
Kagan was sworn into the Maryland House of Delegates on January 11, 1995. She served on the Commerce and Government Matters Committee from 1995 to 1998, afterwards serving on the Appropriations Committee until 2003. She opted against running for re-election in 2002.

=== Maryland Senate ===
In May 2005, Kagan launched an exploratory committee into a potential run against state senator Jennie M. Forehand in 2006, but ultimately decided against running. She unsuccessfully challenged Forehand in 2010, losing by a margin of 356 votes. Kagan again sought to run against Forehand in the 2014 election; however, in January 2014, Forehand announced that she would not seek re-election in 2014. In the Democratic primary, Kagan faced off against state delegate Luiz R. S. Simmons, whom she criticized for blocking domestic violence legislation and for being initially elected to the legislature as a Republican. Despite being outraised by Simmons, Kagan defeated Simmons in the Democratic primary election with 54.6 percent of the vote.

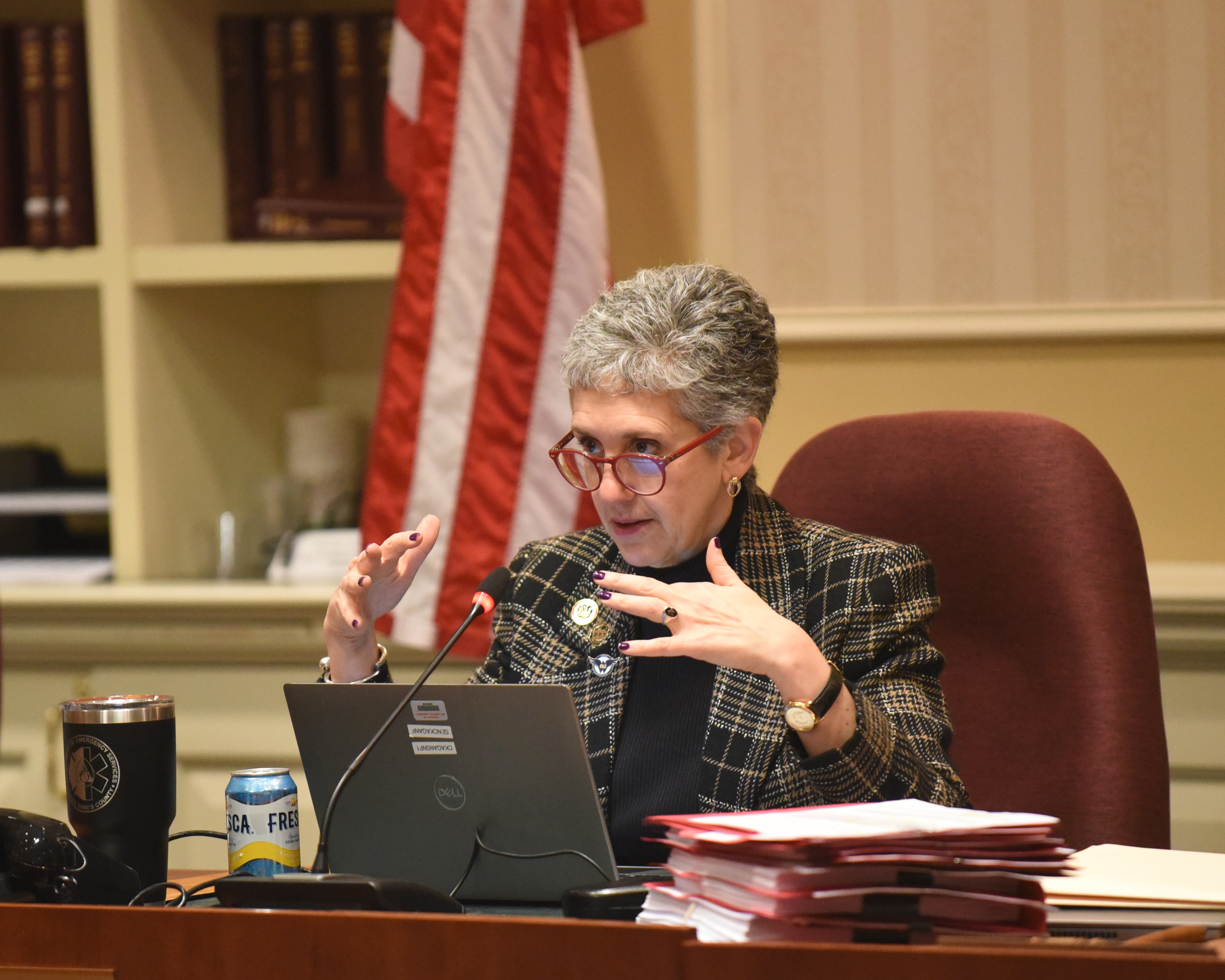
Kagan in the Education, Energy, and the Environment Committee, 2023

Kagan was sworn into the Maryland Senate on January 14, 2015. She has served as a member of the Education, Energy, and the Environment Committee during her entire tenure, including as the committee's vice chair from 2020 to 2022 and from 2023 to 2027.

In March 2018, Kagan accused lobbyist Gilbert J. Genn of inappropriately touching her back and buttocks during a karaoke event at the Castlebay Irish Pub in Annapolis, Maryland. After Genn denied her accusations, Kagan released security camera footage of the incident, after which he acknowledged placing his hand on her back but continued to deny doing anything inappropriate. Following the incident, Kagan supported legislation reforming the state's anti-sexual harassment policies.

In 2020, Kagan unsuccessfully ran for delegate to the Democratic National Convention, pledged to former New York City mayor Michael Bloomberg.

Since 2023, Kagan has served as a member of the Election Assistance Commission's board of advisors.

== Political positions ==
=== Education ===
Kagan does not support providing state funding to private schools. In March 2019, she proposed, but did not introduce, an amendment to the state budget that would limit state funding to private schools unless they increased discrimination protections for students to include disabilities and gender identity.

=== Electoral reform ===
In 2019, Kagan proposed legislation that would allow the use of ranked choice voting in Montgomery County elections. The bill failed to pass out of committee.

During the 2020 legislative session, Kagan introduced a bill to delay the rollout of the state's absentee canvass, citing "election vulnerabilities and fiscal implications". The Maryland Board of Elections paused its implementation of the canvass following errors during the February 2020 primary in the 2020 Maryland's 7th congressional district special election.

In July 2020, Kagan criticized Hogan's decision requiring voters to apply for an absentee ballot to vote by mail in the 2020 general elections. She also scrutinized the multi-step process for applying for a mail-in ballot, which would sometimes send applicants applications in the mail as well as their mail-in ballot, which she said would create "extra steps and extra burdens" on election workers.

During the 2022 legislative session, Kagan introduced a bill to allow the Maryland State Board of Elections to process mail-in ballots before Election Day. She opposed Republican attempts to amend the bill to require signature verification on mail-in ballots. The bill passed, but was vetoed by Governor Hogan. Afterwards, Kagan urged Hogan to sign an executive order to allow the Maryland State Board of Elections to count mail-in ballots early, expressing concerns that his inaction would reinforce conspiracy theories toward mail-in voting. In September 2023, she supported the Maryland State Board of Elections in a lawsuit filed by Republican gubernatorial nominee Dan Cox against the early counting of mail-in ballots in the 2022 general election, in which the Maryland Court of Appeals allowed the Board of Elections to count mail-in ballots early.

In September 2023, Kagan said she supported a Rockville, Maryland referendum to lower the city's voting age to 16 years old.

During the 2024 legislative session, Kagan introduced a bill that would replace the party central committee appointment process used to fill vacancies in the Maryland General Assembly with special elections held at the same time as regular state primary elections. At the time of the bill's introduction, roughly 25 percent of the legislature was initially appointed to their seats through the party central committee process. The bill passed the Maryland Senate in a 43–2 vote, but died in the House of Delegates.

In November 2025, Kagan told Maryland Matters that she supported redrawing Maryland's congressional districts to make Maryland's 1st congressional district more favorable for Democrats in response to Republican mid-decade redistricting efforts in various red states, but called mid-decade redistricting a "risky distraction" that could allow Republicans to gain 1–2 congressional seats in Maryland. In February 2026, she said she opposed pursuing mid-decade redistricting in Maryland and opposed holding a vote on a bill that would redraw Maryland's congressional districts to improve the Democratic Party's chances of winning the 1st congressional district, the only congressional district held by Republicans in the state. In March 2026, after her bill to require special elections to be held in most cases to fill vacancies in the Maryland General Assembly was amended to include a provision to clarify language around how congressional districts could be drawn, Kagan said that she "assumed the bill was now dead" as a result of the amendment. In an interview with Bethesda Magazine following the legislative session, Kagan blamed the House of Delegates for the special elections bill failing to pass.

During the 2026 legislative session, Kagan introduced a bill that would prohibit nonprofits from engaging in political campaigns in exchange for tax-exempt status.

=== Environment ===
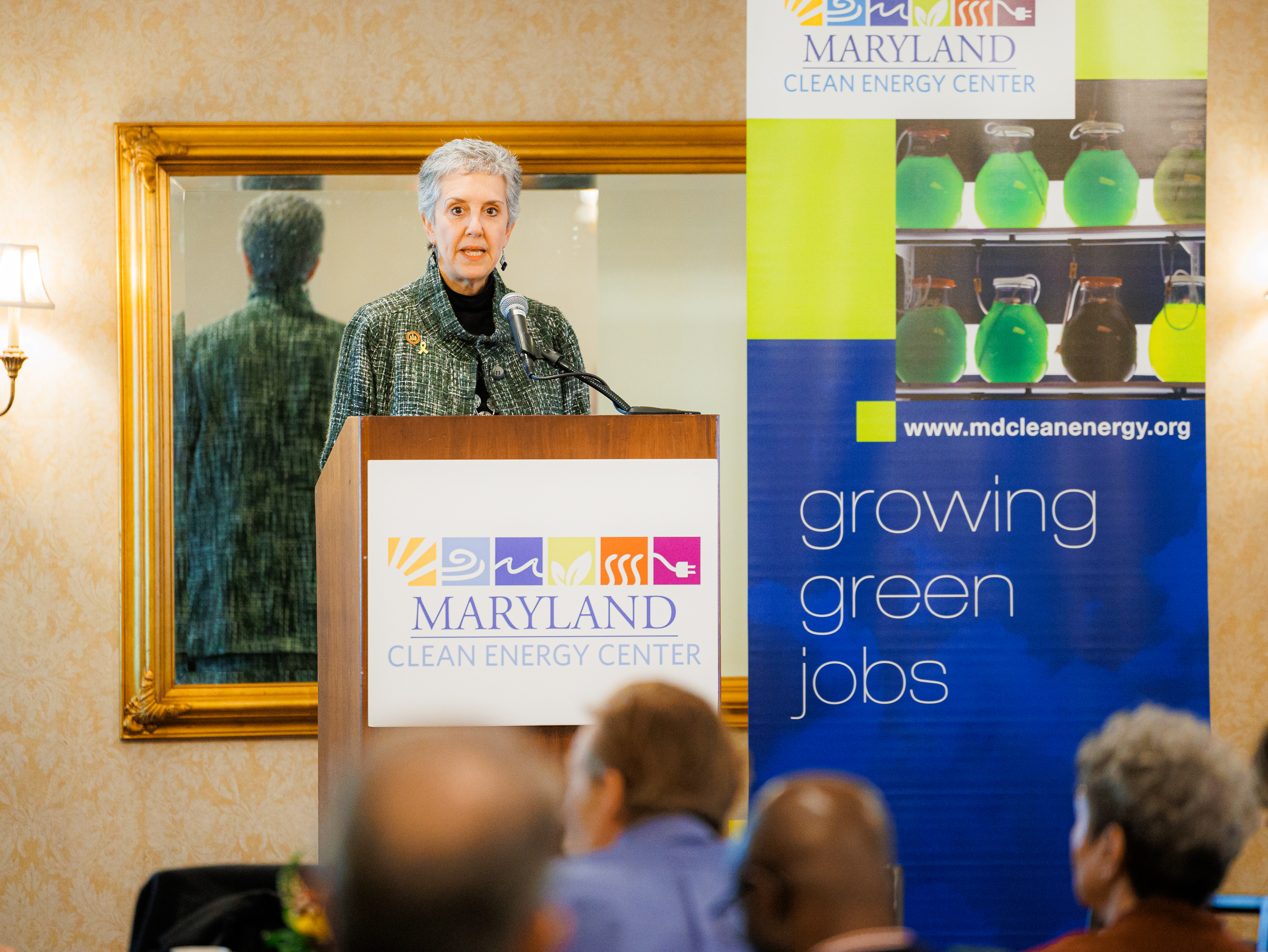
Kagan speaks at a Maryland Clean Energy Center legislative reception, 2025

In March 2017, Kagan attended a protest at the Maryland State House supporting a bill to ban fracking in Maryland.

During the 2019 legislative session, Kagan introduced legislation to ban polystyrene products in Maryland. The bill passed and became law without Governor Larry Hogan's signature.

=== Gun policy ===
Kagan advocated for the passage of the Brady Handgun Violence Prevention Act and the Federal Assault Weapons Ban.

In February 2019, Kagan was one of six Democratic state senators to vote to confirm Governor Larry Hogan's nominees to the Handgun Permit Review Board. All three nominees were rejected in a 21–25 vote. That year, she also supported a bill to repeal the Handgun Permit Review Board.

=== Health care ===
During the 2021 legislative session, Kagan introduced a bill that would allow children 14 years and older to consent to vaccines without parental consent.

=== Israel ===
In November 2023, Kagan and eight other state senators signed a joint letter that threatened to defund immigrants rights group CASA de Maryland because it had called for an immediate ceasefire in the Gaza war and condemned what she characterized as "utilization of US tax dollars to promote the ongoing violence." She refused to accept apologies from CASA executive director Gustavo Torres, saying, "I cannot forgive statements that essentially say he wants to murder my people".

In September 2025, Kagan attended the "50 States One Israel" meeting in Israel to show solidarity with the nation.

=== National politics ===
In January 2018, Kagan condemned President Donald Trump's "shithole countries" remarks, which she called hateful and racist. In September 2018, she penned a letter to Governor Larry Hogan calling on him to open a state investigation into sexual assault allegations made against Supreme Court nominee Brett Kavanaugh. Hogan declined to do so.

During the 2026 legislative session, Kagan introduced a bill that would prohibit people convicted of participating in the January 6 United States Capitol attack from working in state government.

=== Public safety ===
In 2018, Kagan sponsored a bill to establish the Commission to Advance Next Generation 9-1-1 Across Maryland to update state laws and the 9-1-1 financing system to provide the flexibility and resources needed to deploy a statewide NG911 system. She chaired the commission for four years.

During the 2026 legislative session, Kagan introduced a bill to establish a first-in-the-nation statewide 3-1-1 system in Maryland, which was passed and signed into law. The system is expected to be fully operational by the end of 2027.

=== Social issues ===
During the 2015 legislative session, Kagan introduced legislation to provide fertility treatment benefits, including in vitro fertilisation coverage, to married lesbian couples.

In February 2018, Kagan was one of six lawmakers to sponsor a bill to ban conversion therapy for LGBTQ youth.

In January 2019, Kagan was one of nine Maryland lawmakers to add their names to a manifesto signed by 326 state legislators to reaffirm their commitment to protecting abortion rights.

During the 2021 legislative session, Kagan introduced legislation to remove "Maryland, My Maryland" as the state's official anthem. The bill passed and was signed into law by Governor Hogan.

In 2022, Kagan introduced a bill to ban cat declawing in Maryland. The bill passed and was signed into law by Governor Hogan.

During the 2020, 2022, and 2023 legislative sessions, Kagan sponsored bills to require gender-inclusive language for all public bathrooms in Maryland.

During the 2025 legislative session, Kagan introduced a bill to legalize right to repair for wheelchair manufacturers by mandating that manufacturers of powered wheelchairs must make any documentation, tools and software, which previously were available only to certified retailers, accessible. The cross-file passed and is now law.

During the 2026 session, Kagan introduced a bill to establish criminal liability for providing conversion therapy and a health care malpractice cause of action.

=== Transportation ===
Kagan opposed Governor Larry Hogan's proposal to add high-occupancy toll lanes to Interstate 270 and the Capital Beltway, citing concerns with the project's high tolls and environmental impact.

During the 2015 legislative session, Kagan voted to raise the state's maximum speed limit to 70 miles per hour.

In July 2016, after the Washington Metropolitan Area Transit Authority (WMATA) closed the Red Line to make SafeTrack repairs, Kagan wrote to the Maryland Department of Transportation asking the agency to cover costs associated with the county's plan to provide free shuttle bus services to help commuters affected by the transit line's downtime. In July 2019, she criticized the Maryland Department of Transportation for withholding $55.6 million in funding for WMATA, which she predicted would have a "ripple effect" on the District of Columbia and Virginia. After the Hogan administration released $83.5 million in funding for WMATA in September 2019, Kagan criticized the administration's decision to delay funding as "unnecessary" and "disappointing".

== Personal life ==
During the mid-1990s, Kagan dated lobbyist Joel Rozner. A legislative ethics bill complicated their relationship, after Rozner had to report all money spent on Kagan to the State Ethics Commission.

Kagan was married to David Spitzer, a Montgomery County public school teacher whom she met at a concert in Rockville, Maryland. The couple married on August 20, 2000, but are now divorced.

Kagan is Jewish and is a member of Congregation Har Shalom.

Kagan is a nationally ranked Scrabble player. In 2019, she lobbied the North American Scrabble Players Association to bring its annual Scrabble championship to Baltimore in 2020; however, the competition was cancelled amid the COVID-19 pandemic. The event finally happened in 2022.

From 2017 to 2020, Kagan hosted the UnNaugural folk music concert at Montgomery College to raise funds for advocacy groups, including the ACLU, CASA de Maryland, and Planned Parenthood. She also hosts a podcast called Kibbitzing With Kagan, which interviews politicians relevant to state and local Democratic politics.

== Electoral history ==
Maryland House of Delegates District 17 Democratic primary election, 1994
Party	Candidate	Votes	%
Democratic	Kumar P. Barve (incumbent)	5,182	20.8
Democratic	Michael R. Gordon (incumbent)	5,152	20.6
Democratic	Cheryl Kagan	4,064	16.3
Democratic	Luiz R. S. Simmons	3,068	12.3
Democratic	Ruth Spector	2,715	10.9
Democratic	Paul J. Benkert Jr.	1,591	6.4
Democratic	W. Thomas Curtis	1,122	4.5
Democratic	Matthew Anthony Shore	983	3.9
Democratic	Thomas Edward Clarke Jr.	680	2.7
Democratic	Dean Stoline	402	1.6

Maryland House of Delegates District 17 election, 1994
Party	Candidate	Votes	%
Democratic	Michael R. Gordon (incumbent)	18,154	28.4
Democratic	Cheryl Kagan	17,081	26.7
Democratic	Kumar P. Barve (incumbent)	15,978	25.0
Republican	Harrison W. Fox Jr.	12,709	19.9

Maryland House of Delegates District 17 election, 1998
Party	Candidate	Votes	%
Democratic	Michael R. Gordon (incumbent)	18,805	21.6
Democratic	Cheryl Kagan (incumbent)	18,713	21.5
Democratic	Kumar P. Barve (incumbent)	18,617	21.4
Republican	Barney Gorin	11,293	13.0
Republican	Christopher Russell	10,078	11.6
Republican	Richard A. Marvin	9,534	11.0

Maryland Senate District 17 Democratic primary election, 2010
Party	Candidate	Votes	%
Democratic	Jennie M. Forehand (incumbent)	4,129	52.3
Democratic	Cheryl C. Kagan	3,773	47.7

Maryland Senate District 17 Democratic primary election, 2014
Party	Candidate	Votes	%
Democratic	Cheryl C. Kagan	4,713	54.6
Democratic	Luiz R. S. Simmons	3,917	45.4

Maryland Senate District 17 election, 2014
Party	Candidate	Votes	%
Democratic	Cheryl C. Kagan	18,526	68.1
Republican	Steve Zellers	8,496	31.2
Write-in		169	0.6

Maryland Senate District 17 election, 2018
Party	Candidate	Votes	%
Democratic	Cheryl C. Kagan (incumbent)	36,147	79.0
Republican	Josephine J. Wang	9,529	20.8
Write-in		62	0.1

Maryland Senate District 17 election, 2022
Party	Candidate	Votes	%
Democratic	Cheryl C. Kagan (incumbent)	31,639	97.2
Write-in		915	2.8
