= James W. Gilchrist =

American politician (born 1965)

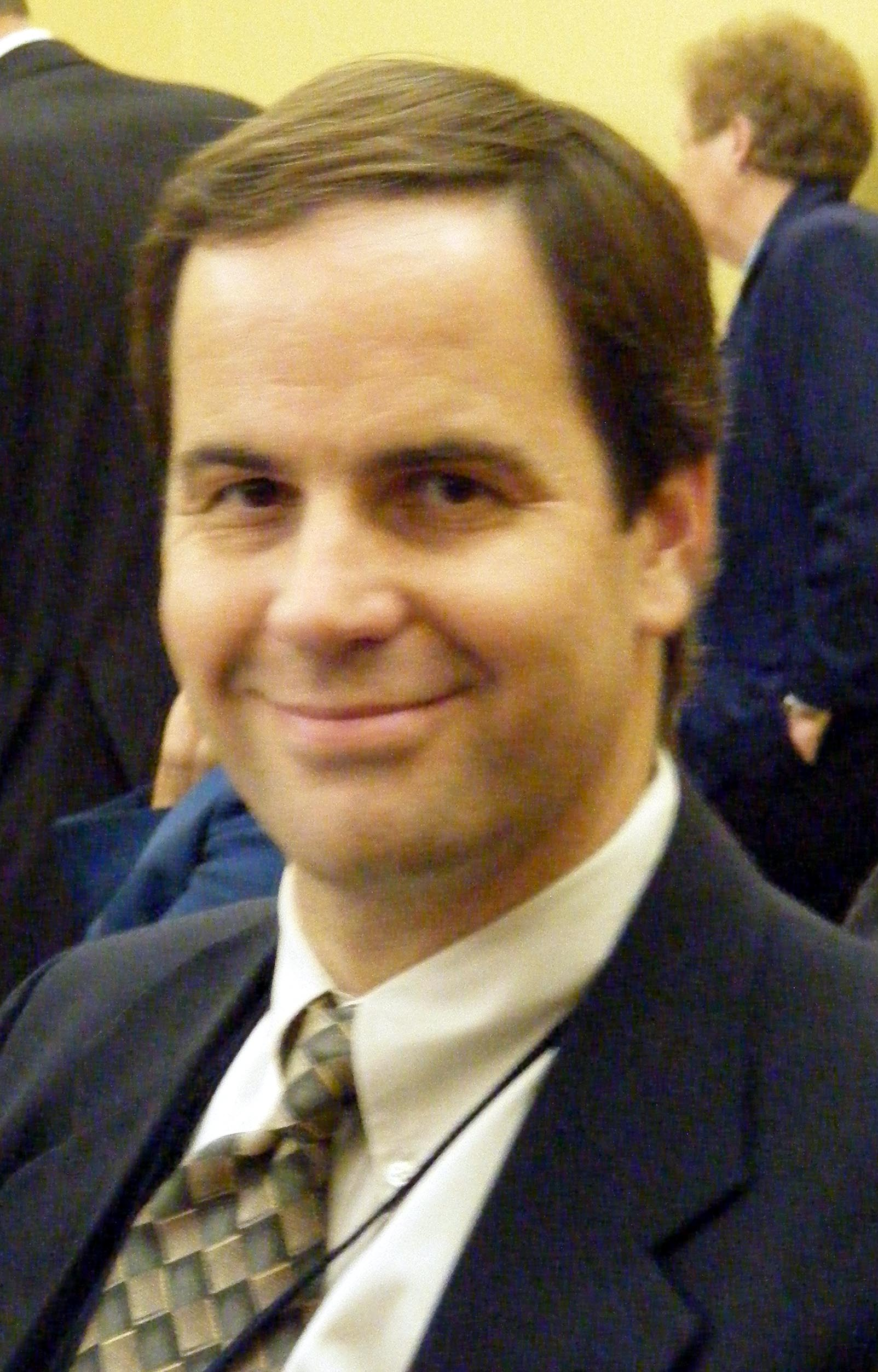
- Gilchrist in 2007

Member of the Maryland House of Delegates from the 17th District
- In office January 10, 2007 – January 11, 2023 Serving with Kumar P. Barve and Julie Palakovich Carr
- Preceded by: Michael R. Gordon
- Succeeded by: Joe Vogel

Personal details
- Born: James Waters Gilchrist; May 1, 1965 (age 61) Washington, D.C., U.S.
- Party: Democratic
- Education: Grinnell College (BA); George Washington University (MBA)

James Waters Gilchrist (born May 1, 1965) is an American politician who served as delegate for Maryland's 17th legislative district from 2007 to 2023, representing Rockville and Gaithersburg.

During his first term, he served on the Ways and Means Committee, where he sat on the Education Subcommittee, the Finance Resources Subcommittee, the Joint Committee on Children, Youth and Families and the Joint Committee on Base Realignment and Closure. For his second term, he moved to the Environmental Matters Committee, where he serves on the Housing and Real Properties Subcommittee and the Environment Subcommittee.

Prior to his election, he worked as a research historian for History Associates, Inc., a community development officer for the Department of Housing and Community Development, policy analyst for the Department of Legislative Services, and a legislative analyst for the Montgomery County Office of Intergovernmental Relations. Gilchrist currently serves as treasurer to the board of directors of the Potomac Area Council of Hosteling International. In his community, he has been the Alliance of Rockville Citizens treasurer, vice president of Americana Centre Condominiums, and chair of the Alliance of Rockville Neighborhood Associations. He has served on the Task Force to Explore the Incorporation of the Principles of Universal Design for Learning into the education systems in Maryland, the Commission on Civic Literacy, and the County Affairs Committee on the Montgomery County delegation.

A resident of Rockville, Gilchrist was raised in Montgomery County, the son of two-term county executive, Charles W. Gilchrist. He received his BA in English from Grinnell College in Iowa, and an MBA from George Washington University.

In September 2021, Gilchrist announced he would not seek a fifth term to the House of Delegates in 2022.

== Legislative notes ==
- voted for the Healthy Air Act in 2006 (SB154)
- voted in favor of increasing the sales tax by 20% – Tax Reform Act of 2007(HB2)
- voted in favor of in-state tuition for undocumented immigrants in 2007 (HB6)
