= Luiz R. S. Simmons =

American politician (born 1949)

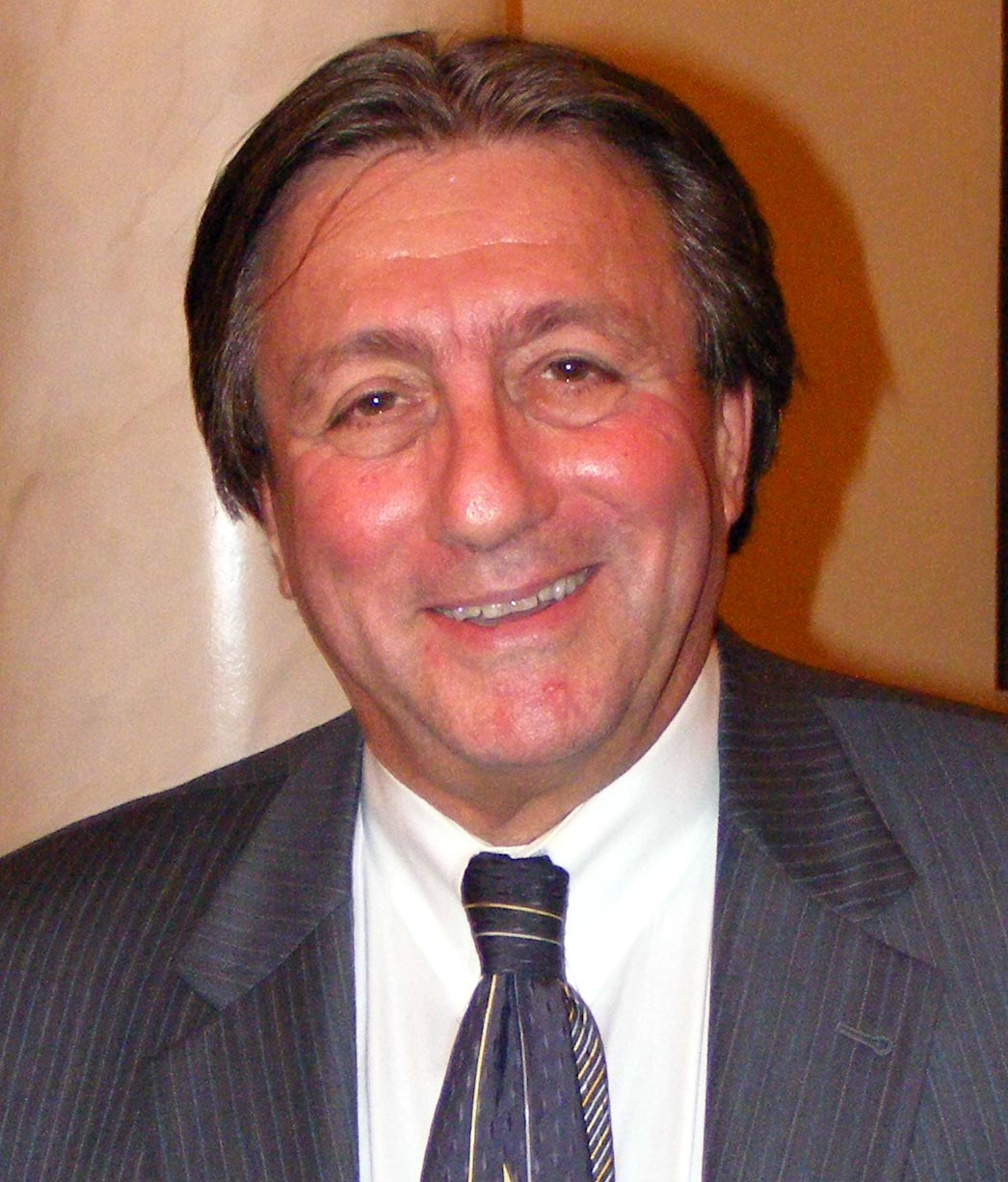
- Simmons in 2007

Member of the Maryland House of Delegates from the 17th district
- In office January 8, 2003 – January 14, 2015
- Preceded by: Cheryl Kagan
- Succeeded by: Andrew Platt
- In office January 10, 1979 – January 12, 1983

Personal details
- Born: January 27, 1949 (age 77) Winchester, Virginia, U.S.
- Party: Democratic (since 2002)
- Other political affiliations: Republican (before 2002)
- Children: 2, including Rachel
- Education: American University School of International Service; Washington College of Law
- Profession: Attorney; politician

Luiz R. S. Simmons (born January 27, 1949) is an American attorney and politician who represented the 17th legislative district of the state of Maryland in the Maryland House of Delegates. The 17th district is located in Montgomery County, and includes Gaithersburg, Rockville and Garrett Park. Simmons was first elected to the Maryland House of Delegates as a Republican in 1975. After serving 4 years, Simmons ran for County Executive in Montgomery County but was defeated in 1982. Simmons was elected again to the House of Delegates, as a Democrat in 2002.

== Background ==
Born in Winchester, Virginia, on January 27, 1949, Simmons attended Plainview – Old Bethpage John F. Kennedy High School in Plainview, New York, graduating in 1966. According to a 1982 article in The Washington Post, his mother is Brazilian American. He attended American University, earning a B.A. from its School of International Service in 1970, and a J.D. from its Washington College of Law in 1974. Simmons was admitted to both the Maryland Bar and the District of Columbia Bar in 1975.

After law school, Simmons served as the General Counsel for U. S. Representative Newton I. Steers from 1976 to 1978. He is the former executive director of the Montgomery-Prince George's Continuing Legal Education Institute, Inc. He is a partner in the law firm of Auerbach & Simmons and represented state delegate Kumar P. Barve on an alcohol-related traffic charge.

== In the legislature ==
Simmons was a member of House of Delegates from January 10, 1979, to January 12, 1983, and from January 8, 2003, to January 11, 2014. During his second stint in the House of Delegates he served on the House Judiciary Committee and the Legislative Policy Committee. Instead of running for re-election, in 2013, Simmons ran for the state senate seat vacated by Maryland state Senator Jennie Forehand.

=== Legislative notes ===
2008

- Primary sponsor: Possessing Stolen Property (HB282 Became Law - Chapter 394)
- Primary sponsor: Preservation of Right to Jury or Judge Trial Act (HB577 Became Law - Chapter 665)
- Primary sponsor: Safe Schools Reporting Act (HB1209 Became Law - Chapter 687)

2007

- Voted in favor of in-state tuition for students who attended Maryland high schools for at least 2 years (HB6-2007)

2006

- Voted for the Healthy Air Act in 2006 (SB154)

2005

- Voted against slots in 2005 (HB1361)
