= Andrew Platt =

American politician

Member of the Maryland House of Delegates from the 17th district
- In office January 14, 2015 – January 9, 2019
- Preceded by: Luiz R. S. Simmons
- Succeeded by: Julie Palakovich Carr

Personal details
- Born: December 12, 1988 (age 37) Gaithersburg, Maryland, U.S.
- Party: Democratic
- Education: Catholic University of America (BA); George Washington University (MA)

Andrew J. Platt (born December 12, 1988) is a former Democratic member of the Maryland House of Delegates who served a single term from 2015 to 2019.

== Career ==
=== House of Delegates ===
In 2017, Platt co-authored the proposal Metro Reform: A Maryland Approach, to improve operations of the Washington Metro.

== See also ==
- Government of Maryland

Maryland House of Delegates
Preceded by Luiz R. S. Simmons	Member of the Maryland House of Delegates from Maryland Legislative District 17; 2015–2019	Succeeded by Julie Palakovich Carr
