= Regis High School (Wisconsin) =

Private, Catholic school in Eau Claire, , Wisconsin, United States

Location
- 2100 Fenwick Avenue; Eau Claire, (Eau Claire County), Wisconsin 54701; United States; 44°48′15″N 91°28′19″W

Information
- Type: Private, Coeducational
- Religious affiliation: Roman Catholic
- Established: 1951
- President: Paul Pedersen
- Principal: Jamie Ganske
- Chaplain: Fr. David Nowicki
- Grades: 9–12
- Colors: Kelly green and white
- Slogan: “Learning Today, Leading Tomorrow”
- Athletics conference: Cloverbelt
- Sports: Soccer, Cross Country, Football, Golf, Tennis, Volleyball, Basketball, Hockey, Dance, Wrestling, Softball, Track
- Team name: Ramblers
- Accreditation: North Central Association of Colleges and Schools
- Newspaper: “The Rambler Report”
- High School Dean: Brady Martin
- Athletic Director: Amy Peterson-Foss
- Website: http://www.regiscatholicschools.com

Regis High School is a private Catholic high school in Eau Claire, Wisconsin in the Diocese of La Crosse. The school serves grades 9 through 12 in high school, while the school building also houses Regis Middle School which serves grades 6 through 8. It is part of the Regis Catholic Schools system, which also includes three elementary schools. Bishop John Joseph Paul helped establish the present school.

== History ==
Regis High School was originally known as St. Patrick's High School. In 1914, Father A.B.C. Dunne added a two-year high school to St. Patrick's grade school. A third year was added in 1919. Monsignor Casper Dowd, Father Dunne's successor, began the construction of St. Patrick's High School and gymnasium in 1927, which housed a four-year high school program.

Eventually the four-year school was not large enough to serve the number of prospective students in the five Eau Claire area parishes (St. Patrick's, St. James the Greater, Immaculate Conception, Sacred Heart. and St. Olaf) and a new building was constructed in the early 1950s. The name St. Patrick's High School was changed to Regis High School during the construction. The new building was in use for the 1953-54 school year.

A full-time development director was added in the mid-1970s to raise additional monies and a Regis foundation was established. While enrollment peaked in the 1960s with more than 800 students and gradually declined thereafter, enrollment has consistently increased the last several years. The enrollment of Catholic students from outside Eau Claire has increased, as well as the number of non-Catholic students.

During the 1997-98 school year, Bishop Raymond Burke created the Catholic Area Schools of the Eau Claire Deanery (C.A.S.E.) to unite the Catholic schools in the Eau Claire area. The seventh and eighth grade classes from Immaculate Conception and St. Patrick's Schools were moved into Regis High School. Later the sixth grade was added to Regis high school during the 2007-2008 school year, from Immaculate Conception, St. James and St. Olaf. In 2010, the name C.A.S.E. was changed to Regis Catholic Schools, honoring the name of the high school.

== Extracurricular activities ==
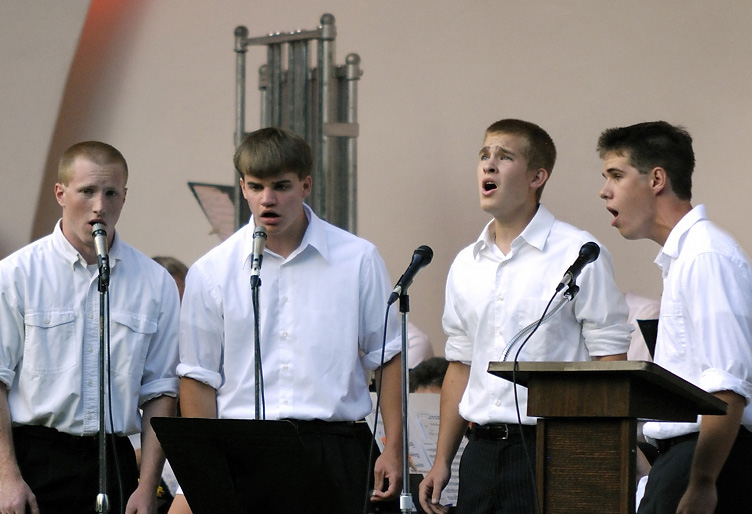
Locked-In, a male quartet consisting of Aaron Wolfe, Sam Peters, Kyle Seyer and Steve Bye, got its start at Regis.

Academic Challenge, Academic Decathlon, Band, Choir, Forensics, Math Team, Mock Trial, National Honor Society, School Newspaper, Student Government, Theater, Yearbook, Youth Leadership Eau Claire

=== Clubs ===
Art Club, Bowling Club, Chess Club, Computer Club, Environmental Club, Key Club International, Multi-Cultural International Club, Pep Club, Pro-life Club, Spanish Club, Tech Club

=== Athletics ===
Boys: Baseball, basketball, cross country, football, golf, hockey, soccer, tennis, track and field, wrestling

Girls: Basketball, cross country, dance team, golf, soccer, softball, tennis, track & field, volleyball

== Notable alumni ==
- Woodrow M. Allen, class of 1961: member of the Maryland House of Delegates
- Mike Kappus, class of 1968: Blues Hall of Fame inductee
- John Menard Jr., class of 1958: founder/owner/president of Menards
- Bill Wampler, class of 2015: professional basketball player
