= Bill Wampler =

American basketball player

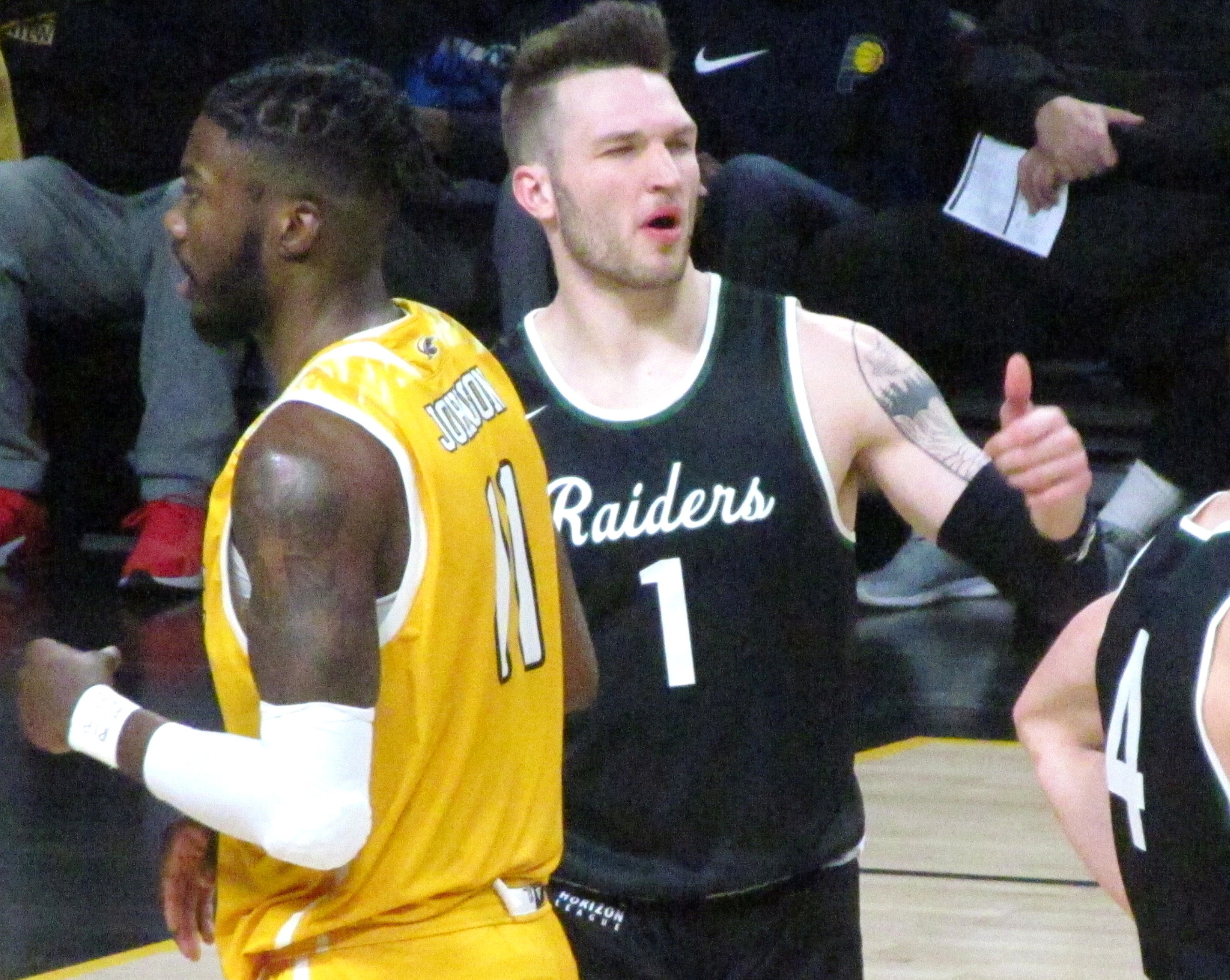
- Wampler in college at Wright State

Personal information
- Born: January 2, 1997 (age 29)
- Listed height: 6 ft 6 in (1.98 m)
- Listed weight: 220 lb (100 kg)

Career information
- High school: Regis (Eau Claire, Wisconsin)
- College: Drake (2015–2017); Wright State (2018–2020)
- NBA draft: 2020: undrafted
- Playing career: 2020–present
- Position: Small forward

Career history
- 2020–2021: Ehingen Urspring

Career highlights
- 2× Second-team All-Horizon League (2019, 2020)

William Wampler (born January 2, 1997) is an American former professional basketball player who played for Ehingen Urspring of the German ProA. He played college basketball at Drake and Wright State.

== Early life ==
Wampler attended Regis High School in Eau Claire, Wisconsin. He scored 48 points in a game. Wampler led Regis to the state title game. He averaged 26 points and seven rebounds per game as a senior and earned all-state and conference player of the year honors. Wampler was a four-time all-conference selection and the sixth-ranked player in Wisconsin. He finished his high school career with 1,966 points. He committed to Drake over offers from Auburn, Creighton, and Davidson.

== College career ==
As a freshman at Drake, Wampler was worn down by the long practices, and the team finished 7–24. He averaged 3.8 points per game, shooting 45 percent from behind the arc. In December 2016, Wampler posted three 20-point plus games, including 27 points against Mississippi Valley State and 23 points against Iowa State. He averaged 9.6 points and 2.5 rebounds per game as a sophomore and made 16 starts. Following the season, Wampler decided to transfer to Wright State over offers from Green Bay, Minnesota, and Ball State, sitting out the following season as a redshirt.

In his Wright State debut against Western Carolina, he posted 26 points. As a junior, Wampler averaged 14.9 points and 3.4 rebounds per game. He was named to the Second Team All-Horizon League. On November 25, 2019, Wampler scored a season-high 27 points in a 72–57 win against Weber State in the Gulf Coast Showcase. Wampler averaged 15.6 and 4.5 rebounds per game as a senior, shooting 40.4 percent from beyond the arc. He was named to the Second Team All-Horizon League for the second consecutive season as well as the Academic Team. Wampler finished his collegiate career with 1,414 points.

== Professional career ==
On September 3, 2020, Wampler signed his first professional contract with Ehingen Urspring of the German ProA. He left the team and returned to the United States for personal reasons.

== National team career ==
Wampler competed for the United States at the FISU America Games in Brazil in 2018.

== Personal life ==
Wampler is the son of Jim and Michelle Wampler and has five siblings. He has spoken publicly about his struggles with depression. Wampler has several tattoos, including one on his wrist that says "The sun will rise and we will try again," and a rendering of a setting in Upper Michigan with a lake, waterfall and evergreen trees on his arm. He is a Christian and took part in Athletes-in-Action trip to Brazil in July 2018.
