= Laurence Levitan =

American politician (1933–2024)

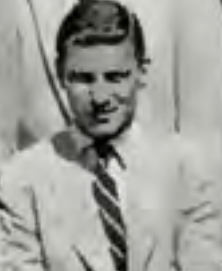
- Levitan while at Washington and Lee University, mid 1950s

Member of the Maryland Senate from the 15th district
- In office January 8, 1975 – January 11, 1995
- Succeeded by: Jean Roesser

Member of the Maryland House of Delegates from the 15th district
- In office January 13, 1971 – January 8, 1975
- Succeeded by: District split

Personal details
- Born: October 22, 1933 Washington, D.C., U.S.
- Died: March 20, 2024 (aged 90) Bethesda, Maryland, U.S.
- Party: Democratic
- Spouse: Barbara Levin (m. 1958)
- Children: 3
- Parent(s): Maurice Levitan; Nathlie Levitan
- Education: Washington and Lee University (B.D.); George Washington University Law School
- Profession: Lawyer

Laurence Levitan (October 22, 1933 – March 20, 2024) was an American politician who served in the Maryland Senate representing District 15 from 1975 to 1995. A member of the Democratic Party, Levitan previously represented the district in the Maryland House of Delegates from 1971 to 1975.

== Early life and education ==
Laurence Levitan was born in Washington on October 22, 1933, to Nathlie Levitan and Maurice Levitan (died 2019). Levitan grew up in Northwest Washington. After graduating from Jackson-Reed High School, Levitan received a bachelor's degree in commerce from Washington and Lee University in 1955 and a law degree from George Washington University in 1958. Levitan was a member of Zeta Beta Tau at Washington and Lee University.

== Career ==
A Democrat, Levitan served for four years in the Maryland House of Delegates before he was elected in 1974 to represent the Maryland Legislative District 15. At the start of his second Senate term, Levitan was selected to lead the Maryland Budget and Taxation Committee, a position he held for 16 years. Levitan was defeated in his 1994 reelection bid by Jean Roesser. Laurence served as Maryland Chamber of Commerce Fiscal Structure Commission Representative in 2002. Levitan was nicknamed "Larry the Cat". He also served as a member of the Morgan State University Board of Regents and on the Board of Directors of Strathmore. Levitan was awarded the Five-Star Distinguished Alumni Award by Washington and Lee University in 2010. Levitan was a former member of the Greater Washington Jewish Community Foundation Board of Trustees.

== Personal life and death ==
Levitan resided in Bethany Beach, Delaware, a town he moved to in 2012. Levitan was married to Barbara Levin, whom he married in 1958. He had three children.

Levitan died from congestive heart failure in Bethesda, Maryland, on March 20, 2024, at age 90.
