= Donald B. Robertson =

American politician (1931–2024)

Member of the Maryland House of Delegates
- In office 1971–1989

Personal details
- Born: Donald Brackett Robertson; October 6, 1931 Washington, D.C.
- Died: November 24, 2024 (aged 93)
- Party: Democratic
- Education: Oberlin College; Columbia University School of Law

Donald Brackett Robertson (October 6, 1931 – November 24, 2024) was an American politician. A member of the Democratic Party of the Maryland House of Delegates from 1971 to 1989.

== Life and career ==
Robertson was born in Washington, D.C., the son of Nathan, a newspaper reporter, and Elizabeth Robertson, a medical secretary. He attended Oberlin College, earning his B.A. degree in 1953. After graduating, he served as a United States Navy officer on the USS Hickox for two years, which after his discharge, he attended Columbia University School of Law, earning his LL.B degree in 1958.

Robertson served in the Maryland House of Delegates from 1971 to 1989. After his service in the House, he served as a board counsel of the Montgomery County Board of Supervisors of Elections, serving until 2002.

== Death ==
Robertson died on November 24, 2024, at the age of 93.
