= Jennie M. Forehand =

American politician (1935–2023)

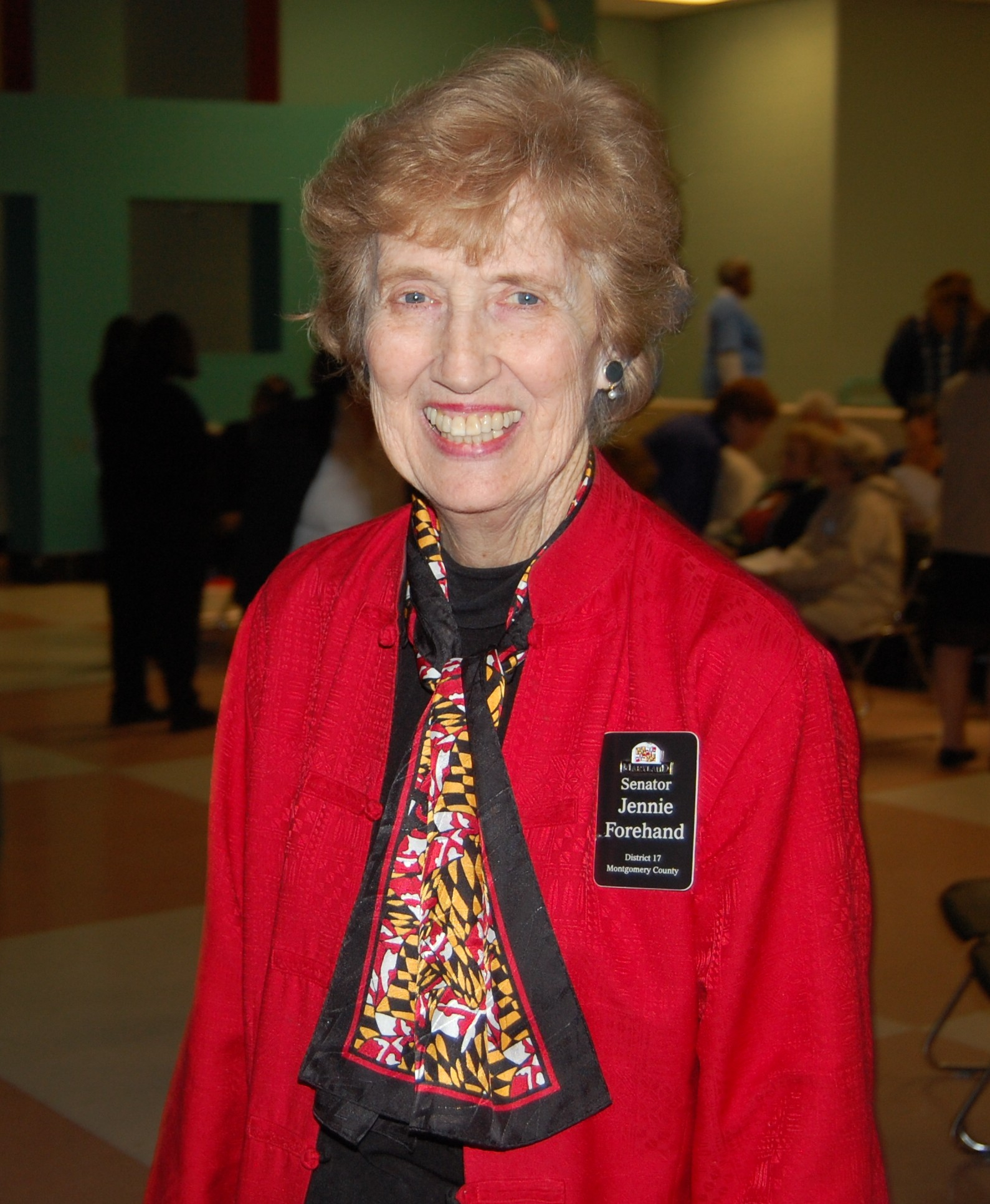
- Forehand in 2011

Member of the Maryland Senate from the 17th district
- In office January 11, 1995 – January 14, 2015
- Preceded by: Mary H. Boergers
- Succeeded by: Cheryl Kagan

Member of the Maryland House of Delegates from the 17th district
- In office 1978–1994
- Preceded by: S. Frank Shore
- Succeeded by: Cheryl Kagan

Personal details
- Born: Jennie Margaret Meador; December 17, 1935 Nashville, Tennessee, U.S.
- Died: October 3, 2023 (aged 87) Indianapolis, Indiana, U.S.
- Party: Democratic
- Spouse: William Ellis Forehand Jr. (m. 1958)
- Children: 2
- Education: University of North Carolina at Chapel Hill (BS)
- Occupation: Businesswoman; politician

Jennie Margaret Meador Forehand (December 17, 1935 – October 3, 2023) was an American businesswoman and legislator who served in the Maryland Senate, representing Rockville, Gaithersburg, and Garrett Park. She also served four terms in the Maryland House of Delegates.

== Early life and family ==
Jennie Margaret Meador was born in Nashville, Tennessee, on December 17, 1935, to James Taylor Meador. She attended the Woman's College of the University of North Carolina in Greensboro, North Carolina. She also attended the University of North Carolina at Chapel Hill, receiving her Bachelor of Science degree in Industrial Relations in 1958.

She married William Ellis Forehand Jr. in 1958. They had two children.

== Career ==
Forehand founded Forehand Antiques and Interiors and worked as a teacher, juvenile court probation counselor, and statistician.

== Political career ==
Forehand was appointed to the Maryland House of Delegates in 1978 following the resignation of state delegate S. Frank Shore. She represented Montgomery County and its 17th district in the Maryland House of Delegates between until 1994, afterwards serving in the Maryland Senate from January 11, 1995, to January 14, 2015.

=== Issues ===
==== Transportation ====
Forehand kept transportation issues "on the front burner" for citizens and public officials. She served on the MD-DC-VA Regional Transportation Planning Board overseeing the strategic development and federal funding for the area's rail and roadway development. Forehand assisted the Inter-County Connector in continuing construction after years of delay.

==== Health ====
Forehand had a passion for health related issues. She played a leading role in making Maryland "smoke-free," gaining recognition from the American Cancer Society for her efforts. She was the first state legislator in the nation to propose prohibiting genetic-based discrimination in health insurance and in the workplace.

She supported the strategic expansion of local health care resources including the Adventist Hospital. As a director on the board of Hospice Caring, she helped create the facility.

Forehand gave many speeches on depression as the result of her mother's recovery from severe clinical depression. She was a "founding mother" of Rockville's JLG Regional Institute for Children and Adolescents (RICA), a community-based, clinical and educational facility serving those with severe emotional disabilities.

==== Economic development ====
As a legislator, Forehand had a knack for recognizing early on the technologies and trends that would affect her constituents and the state economy.

Forehand was a very early advocate for the biotechnology industry and promoted its economic potential for Montgomery County by introducing legislation to promote venture capital investment in start-up companies and facilitate community-based "business incubators".

==== Environment ====
A supporter of Program Open Space to protect park and recreation areas in the State, Forehand was there at the beginning as this program took shape. As recently as 2009, she successfully fought on the Senate floor against restrictions that would have devastated POS programs in her district.

Forehand served on the Department of Environment's Task Force on Attaining Federal Air Quality Standards and was responsible for the first pilot program to test emission from diesel trucks. She cosponsored environmental legislation in the Senate.

==== Women ====
Forehand was president of the Women's Legislative Network of the National Conference of State Legislatures (NCSL) and president of the Women Legislators of Maryland.

Early on in her career, Forehand took the lead on issues including domestic violence, day care access, family leave, child support, reproductive freedom and greater representation of women in the judiciary. Her efforts won her recognition as a "Trailblazer" from the Women's Bar Association and put her into the Maryland's Top 100 Women Circle of Excellence.

== Later life and death ==
Forehand did not run for re-election in 2014 and retired in January 2015.

After retiring from the state legislature, she and her husband moved to Indianapolis. She died from Alzheimer's disease on October 3, 2023, at the age of 87.

== Awards ==
- 2009 — Maryland Department of Transportation Champion of Traffic Safety
- 2008 — National Institutes of Health Director's Award for Leadership & Biosafety Oversight Maryland Municipal League Municipal Super Star Award
- 2007 — Washington Regional Alcohol Program (WRAP) Award
- 2006 — Greater Washington Society for Clinical Social Work MD State Senator of the Year; UMBI Biotechnology Leadership Award
- 2005 — Citizens' Review Board for Children Champion for Children Award; Montgomery County Department of Health and Human Services Clean Air Advocate
- 2003 — Montgomery County Business and Professional Women Woman of the Year
- 2003 — Daily Record Maryland's Top 100 Women Circle of Excellence (for being named to Maryland's Top 100 Women three times); Rockville Chamber of Commerce Citizen of the Year Maryland Impaired Driving Coalition Distinguished Legislator Award
- 2002 — MADD Award of Excellence; American Cancer Society True Champion; Montgomery County Chamber of Commerce Outstanding Transportation Leader of the Year
- 2001 — Metropolitan Washington Board of Trade Leader of the Year; Marylanders for Efficient and Safe Highways Transportation Advocate of the Year Award
- 1999 — Daily Record Maryland's Top 100 Women; Maryland Municipal League Award
- 1998 — MD State's Attorneys Association Senator of the Year; Asbury Village President's Award for Service; The Greater Washington Board of Trade Intercounty Connector Award
- 1996 — American Massage Therapy Association, Maryland Chapter Award; Montgomery County Medical Society Legislator of the Year
- 1993 — Women's Bar Association's Margaret Brent Trailblazer Award
- 1993 — Suburban Maryland High Technology Council Technology Leadership Award; Montgomery County Medical Society Outstanding Legislator of the Year
- 1992 — Maryland Planned Parenthood Public Affairs Award
- 1991 — Shady Grove Adventist Hospital Community Service Award
- 1988 — Montgomery County Arts Council Outstanding Advocate Award
- 1987 — Johns Hopkins University Peabody Medallion Award
- 1986 — Maryland College of Art and Design President's Award
