= Kumar Barve =

American politician

Kumar P. Barve
- कुमार प्रभाकर बर्वे
- Barve in 2016

Chair of the Maryland Public Service Commission
- Incumbent
- Assumed office January 12, 2026
- Preceded by: Frederick Hoover

Member of the Maryland House of Delegates from the 17th district
- In office January 9, 1991 – May 1, 2023
- Preceded by: Mary H. Boergers
- Succeeded by: Ryan Spiegel

Personal details
- Born: Kumar Prabhakar Barve; September 8, 1958 (age 68) Schenectady, New York, U.S.
- Party: Democratic
- Spouse: Maureen Quinn
- Education: Georgetown University (BS)
- Occupation: Financial officer

Kumar Prabhakar Barve (Marathi: कुमार प्रभाकर बर्वे; born September 8, 1958) is an American politician who has served as the chair of the Maryland Public Service Commission since 2026. A member of the Democratic Party, he was a member of the Maryland House of Delegates, representing district 17 in Montgomery County, from 1991 to 2023. He was the first Indian-American to be elected to a state legislature in the United States. From 2002 to 2015, Barve served as Majority Leader of the House of Delegates.

His legislative work focused largely on protecting the environment, improving health care, and the promotion of the high-tech industry in Maryland. In 2015, he was appointed to chair the House Environment and Transportation Committee, which oversees transportation, the environment, agriculture, ethics, and housing and real property law. He sponsored both the 1995 Health Access Act that place limits on HMOs for the first time and legislation that created the Technology Development Corporation of Maryland.

He unsuccessfully ran for Congress in 2016 in Maryland's 8th congressional district, losing the Democratic Primary to the eventual winner, State Senator Jamie Raskin.

== Early life and education ==
Barve was born on September 8, 1958, in Schenectady, New York, to a Marathi father Prabhaker B. "Balu" and a Marathi-American mother Neera P. (née Gokhale) Barve. His maternal grandparents moved from Mumbai, Maharashtra, India to Schenectady as his grandfather, Shankar Laxman Gokhale was a professor. Shankar Gokhale was born in Wai, Maharashtra.

The Barve family later moved to Maryland, where he attended Paint Branch High School in Silver Spring. In 1980, Barve graduated from Georgetown University's McDonough School of Business with a B.S. degree in Accounting.

== Legislative career ==
Barve was first elected to the House of Delegates in 1990, finishing third in the contest for district 17's three seats behind incumbents Jennie M. Forehand and Mike Gordon but ahead of four other challengers. As a result of his victory, Barve became the first Indian-American to serve in a state legislature. He took office in January, 1991, and was appointed to the House Economic Matters Committee, which considers legislation related to business and labor policy and regulation.

After his first re-election in 1994, Barve rose in leadership with his appointment as chair of a subcommittee, first the Real Property subcommittee in 1995 and 1996, and later the Science and Technology Subcommittee from 1997 to 2003. Also in 1995, he was elected to chair the Montgomery County Delegation to Annapolis. Barve was re-elected in 1998, 2002, 2006, and 2010.

Following the election of a new Speaker, Michael E. Busch, in 2003, Barve was appointed to serve as majority leader, the leader of the Democratic majority and second in command to the Speaker. He served for two years on the Environmental Matters Committee before moving again to the Ways and Means Committee, where he oversaw tax policy as Chair of the Revenues Subcommittee from 2007 to 2010. In additional, he serves on a number of major joint committees, including the Legislative Policy Committee, Spending Affordability Committee, as chair of the Joint Information Technology and Biotechnology Committee, and as house chair of the Joint Committee on Transparency and Open Government.

In 2015, Barve left his post as majority leader to become chair of the renamed Environment and Transportation Committee. His appointment coincided with the election of a new Republican Governor, Larry Hogan and debate over a number of significant environmental issues. Among the significant pieces of legislation Barve's committee worked on in the first year of the new term were a moratorium and public health study on fracking, a major reform to the state's stormwater protection fee, and debate over regulations which will require farms to severely limit the phosphorus that runs from their lands into the Chesapeake Bay.

Barve's work as a legislator over the length of his career has focused on a broad range of issues. In 1995, he successfully sponsored the first state bill in the nation to regulate HMOs, the Maryland Health Access Act of 1995. The act allows health care patients to see doctors outside of the network of HMO providers, ensures that HMOs can't bar providers from sharing information if it jeopardizes patient care, and prohibits the use of financial incentives by HMOs that curtail and compromise care. He later co-sponsored the law that bars insurance companies based in Maryland from using pre-existing conditions to deny coverage.

Barve has also worked extensively on the promotion of technology and of high tech businesses. He authored Maryland's version of the Uniform Computer Information Transactions Act (UCITA). The Act both affirms the intellectual-property rights of software developers and provides unprecedented consumer protections to purchasers of computer equipment. He sponsored legislation that created the Technology Development Corporation of Maryland, which promotes high-technology business development in Maryland. In 1999, Barve's bill to define the powers of corporations in making certain gifts passed both houses and was signed by the governor.

In the 2008 presidential election, Barve endorsed Barack Obama for president.

== Maryland Public Service Commission ==
On April 6, 2023, Governor Wes Moore announced he would appoint Barve to the Maryland Public Service Commission. He resigned from the Maryland House of Delegates on May 1, 2023. In January 2026, after Maryland Public Service Commission chairman Frederick Hoover announced that he would resign, Barve was named as the chair of the commission.

== Personal life ==
In November 2007, Barve was cited by Gaithersburg Police for driving under the influence of alcohol while operating a vehicle. On July 17, 2008, Barve pleaded guilty and received a probation before judgement, and suspension of all but $200 of a $1,000 fine.

In 2008, it was reported that Barve and his wife were inappropriately receiving a Homestead Property Tax Credit on two properties that they had owned separately prior to their marriage. Barve indicated that he had assumed Anne Arundel County would delete the tax credit on the property his wife had owned prior to their marriage once the couple declared his residence in Gaithersburg to be their primary joint residence. While early reports were critical of Barve, the Associate Director of Assessments and Taxation for Maryland later told reporters than nothing improper had taken place, and that such errors had occurred repeatedly in cases where individuals owned homes and then later married. Barve pledged that he would re-pay any money that the couple did not pay earlier due to the error.

Maryland House of Delegates
Preceded by Mary H. Boergers	Member of the Maryland House of Delegates from Maryland Legislative District 17; 1991–2023	Succeeded by Ryan Spiegel
