= Warrior Princess =

Warrior Princess may refer to:

- "Warrior Princess", the 2014 Mongolian hit film about the life of Queen Anu
- Xena: Warrior Princess, a 1995-2001 American television series
  - "The Warrior Princess" (Hercules: The Legendary Journeys), an episode of Hercules: The Legendary Journeys
  - Xena: Warrior Princess (comics)
- X-wing Rogue Squadron: The Warrior Princess, a 1996 story arc of the X-wing: Rogue Squadron comics series
- Diana: Warrior Princess, a 2003 roleplaying game by Heliograph Incorporated
- Warrior Princess: A U.S. Navy SEAL's Journey to Coming out Transgender, a 2013 memoir of Kristin Beck, a former United States Navy SEAL who came out as a trans woman
- nickname of English professional kickboxer Ruqsana Begum (born 1983)

== See also ==
- Women warriors in literature and culture
- List of female action heroes
- List of women warriors in folklore
- Ramayana: The Legend of Prince Rama, a 1992 anime film based on the ancient Indian epic Ramayana, also released as Warrior Prince
- Arjun: The Warrior Prince, a 2012 Indian animated film based on Arjuna, the hero of the ancient Indian epic Mahabharta
