= Speckhard =

Speckhard is a surname. Notable people with the surname include:

- Anne Speckhard, American Adjunct Associate Professor of Psychiatry
- Daniel V. Speckhard (born 1959), American diplomat and nonprofit executive
