= Lily Qi =

American politician (born 1963)

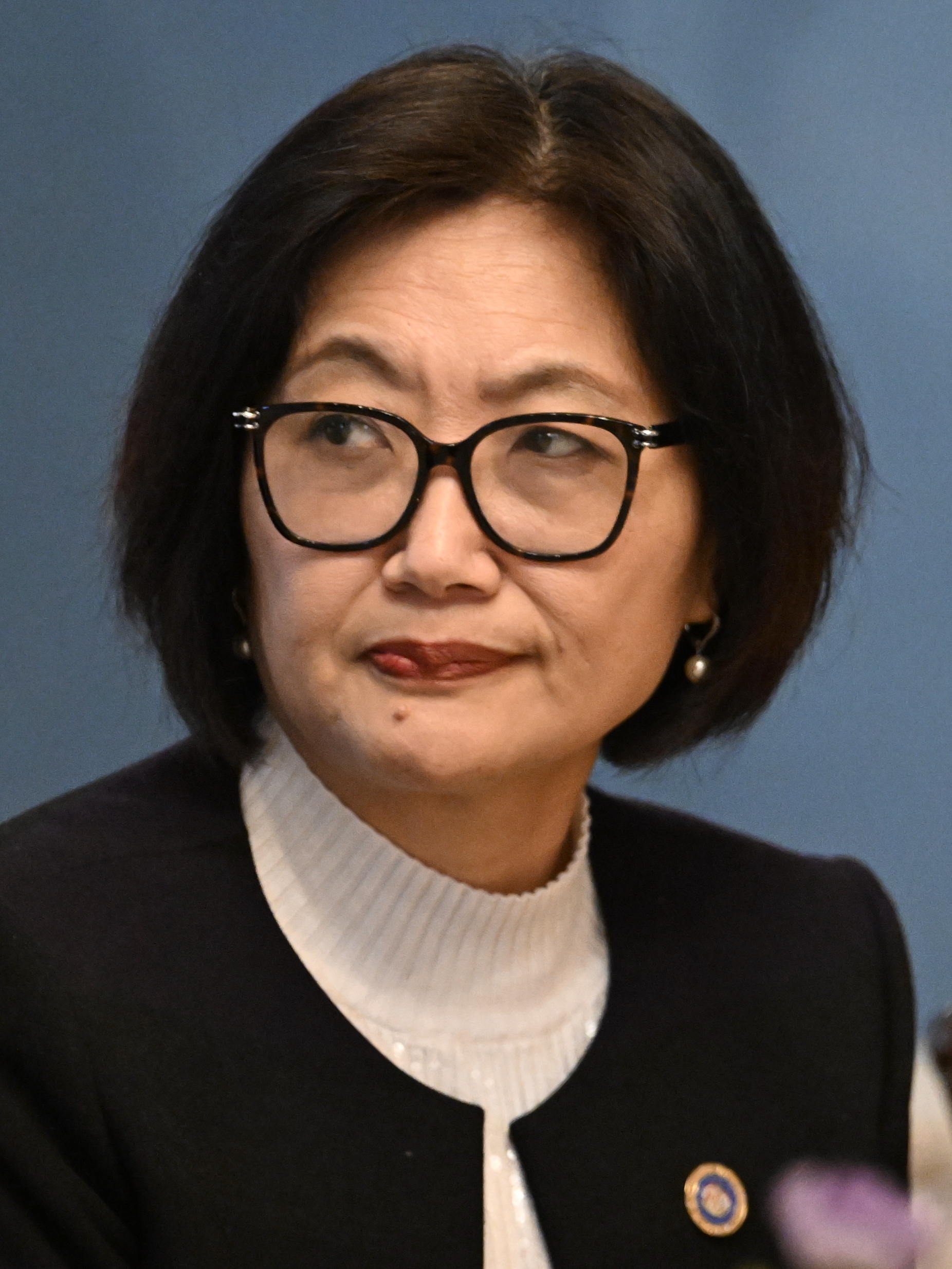
- Qi in 2024

Member of the Maryland House of Delegates from the 15th district
- Incumbent
- Assumed office January 9, 2019 Serving with Kathleen Dumais, David Fraser-Hidalgo, Linda Foley
- Preceded by: Aruna Miller

Personal details
- Born: November 4, 1963 (age 62) Shanghai, China
- Party: Democratic
- Spouse: Phil Peng
- Children: 1
- Education: Manchester University (MA); Ohio University (MA); American University (MBA)
- Website: www.lilyqi.com
- Lily Qi's voice Lily Qi on her priorities in the Maryland General Assembly; Recorded May 19, 2023

Hong Qi (born November 4, 1963) is an American politician who represents the 15th legislative district in the Maryland House of Delegates. Qi previously worked as a chief administrator for economic development under Isiah Leggett.

== Early life and career ==
Qi was born in Shanghai, China on November 4, 1963. She grew up during the height of the Cultural Revolution, during which her family was persecuted. She migrated to Indiana on February 22, 1989, where she attended Manchester University on a sponsorship from Manchester professor Al Deeter, for whom she worked as a translator when he visited Shanghai. While at Manchester, she met her future husband, Yu "Phil" Peng. She graduated from Manchester University in 1991, earning a M.A. degree in communication studies. Afterwards, the couple worked at universities in Athens, Ohio, and Morgantown, West Virginia. In 1997, the couple moved to Montgomery County, Maryland, after Qi accepted a position working on multicultural affairs at American University. She became a citizen of the United States in 1999 and earned a M.B.A. degree in marketing and global information technology management in 2001 while working at American University. After graduating, Qi began working on economic development for a couple of nonprofit organizations.

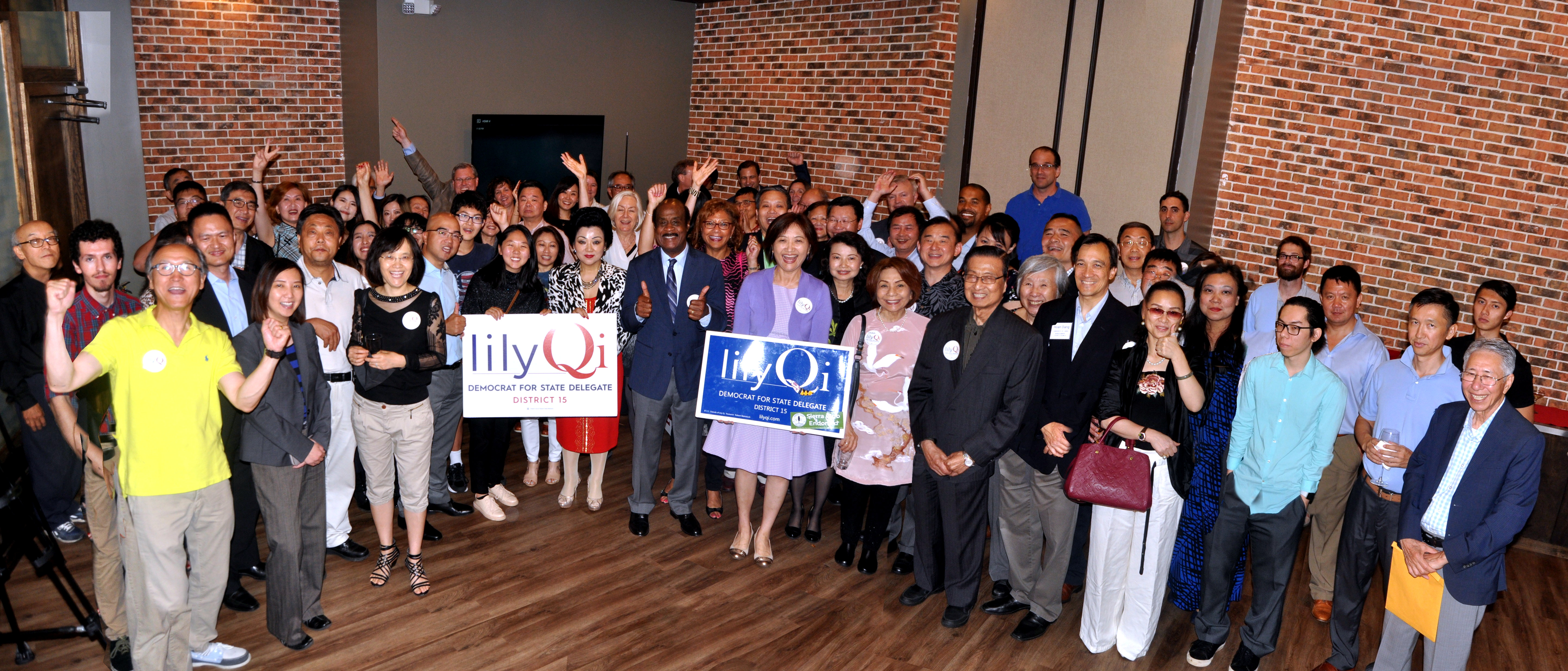
Qi campaigning in 2018

Qi began her career in politics with under the administration of Montgomery County executive Ike Leggett, who asked her to serve as a liaison to the Asian American community after his election win in 2006. In April 2016, Leggett appointed Qi to serve as his Assistant Chief Administrative Officer on economic and workforce matters in Montgomery County, becoming the first Asian American to serve the position. Following Hillary Clinton's loss in the 2016 United States presidential election, Qi applied to a training course hosted by Emerge Maryland, an organization created to prepare potential female Democratic candidates for public office, to learn about the process of running for public office.

== In the legislature ==
In November 2017, Qi announced her candidacy for the Maryland House of Delegates, seeking to succeed state delegate Aruna Miller. During the Democratic primary, she was endorsed by Leggett and the Maryland Sierra Club. Her 2018 campaign and election were noted for mobilizing the local Chinese-American community through WeChat. She won the general election with 23.6 percent of the vote, becoming the first Chinese-born state legislator in Maryland.

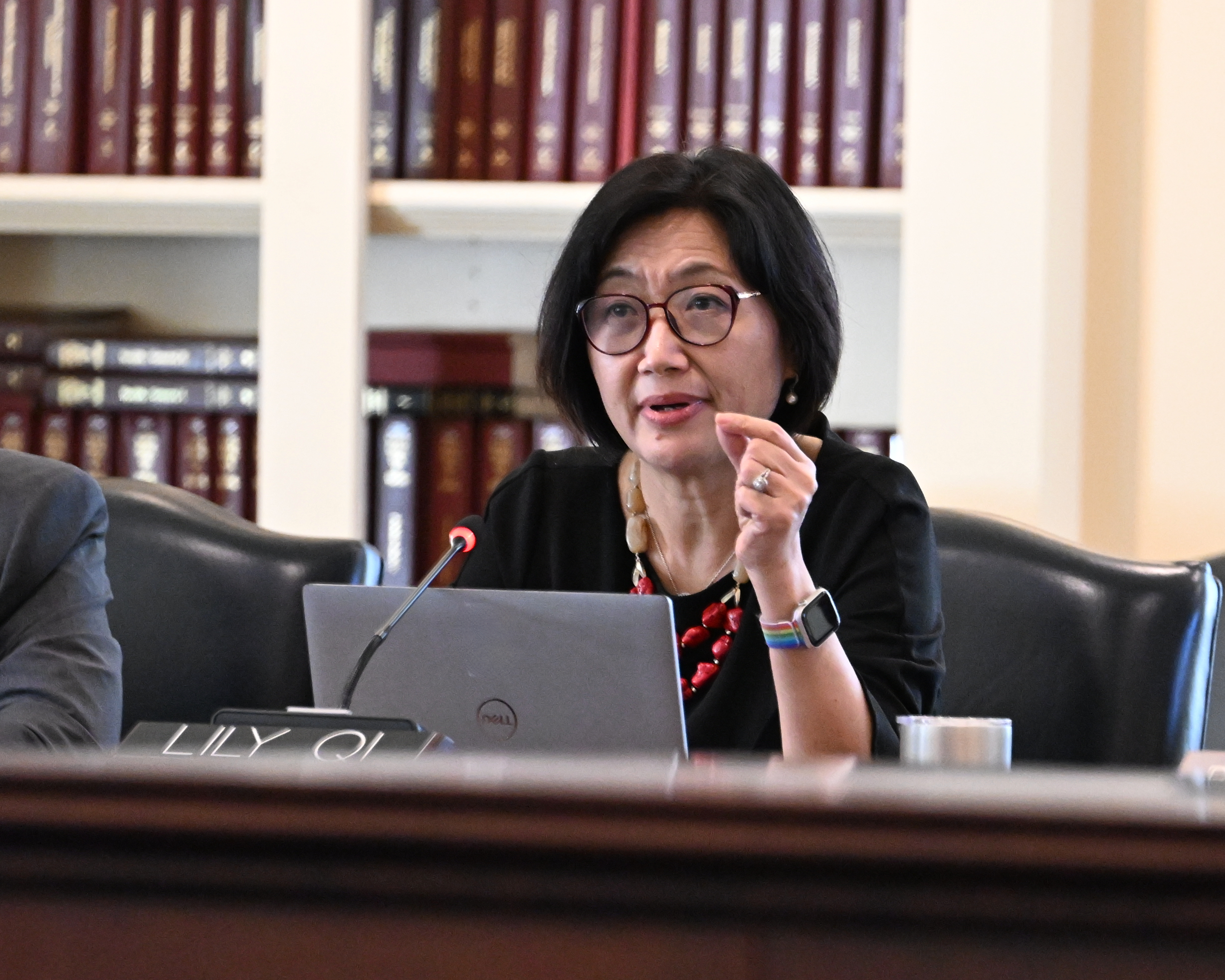
Qi in the Economic Matters Committee, 2024

Qi was sworn into the Maryland House of Delegates on January 9, 2019. She was a delegate to the 2024 Democratic National Convention, pledged to Kamala Harris.

Qi has served as a member of the Economic Matters Committee since 2019, including as the vice chair of its business regulation subcommittee. She has also served as a deputy majority whip during the 2022 legislative session, and is a member of the Legislative Asian-American and Pacific-Islander Caucus, the Legislative Latino Caucus, the Legislative Transit Caucus, and the Women Legislators of Maryland. In January 2026, House Speaker Joseline Peña-Melnyk named Qi as the co-chair of the newly-created House Study Group on Economic Stability.

In July 2026, Qi's autobiographical book, Elected American: From Red China to Blue Maryland, was published by Temple University Press. The book follows Qi's early life in Shanghai, her decision to study in the U.S. and to stay in the country after her studies, and her election to the Maryland House of Delegates in 2018.

== Political positions ==
=== Alcohol ===
Qi introduced legislation in 2021 legislative session that would allow for the sale of beer and wine in grocery stores. She introduced legislation in the 2022 legislative session that would create a ballot referendum on allowing grocery stores to sell wine and beer, but it failed to move out of committee.

=== COVID-19 pandemic ===
In June 2020, Qi coordinated the donation of 20,000 masks from Xi'an, a sister city of Montgomery County, Maryland, in response to the COVID-19 pandemic.

In August 2020, Qi joined a half dozen Maryland legislators in sending a letter to Governor Larry Hogan to push for widespread antibody testing and public disclosure of the results.

=== Education ===
During her 2018 campaign, Qi said that she supports expanding magnet programs in Montgomery County and making universal pre-K a statewide priority.

=== Housing ===
In January 2021, Qi voted against legislation that would require Montgomery County landlords to provide just cause for evicting a tenant from a residential property, saying that there could be a better solution, such as a third-party "referee" and that some landlords might rely on one or two properties as a main income stream.

Qi introduced legislation in the 2021 legislative session that would create a pilot program to provide homeless people with a mobile laundry service. The bill passed and was signed into law by Governor Larry Hogan on May 18, 2021.

=== Immigration ===
Qi says that she "does not believe Maryland needs sanctuary community designation", conveying that Maryland already has safe and welcoming communities. She opposes the use of local resources to enforce federal law when it comes to sanctuary policies.

=== Minimum wage ===
Qi supports a $15 minimum wage. She voted in favor of Senate Bill 280, which would gradually raise the state's minimum wage to $15 an hour by 2025.

=== National politics ===
In April 2016, Qi endorsed Hillary Clinton in the 2016 Democratic Party presidential primaries and Chris Van Hollen in the 2016 United States Senate election in Maryland. She also moderated a non-partisan debate between candidates for Maryland's 8th congressional district in 2016.

In January 2020, Qi filed to run as a convention delegate for Pete Buttigieg at the 2020 Democratic National Convention.

=== Social issues ===
Qi supported Question 6, saying that a vote in favor of same-sex marriage would improve the climate for entrepreneurs in Maryland.

In March 2018, Qi testified in support of naming an elementary school in Montgomery County after Bayard Rustin, noting that her son came out as gay the summer before he began college.

== Electoral history ==
Maryland House of Delegates District 15 Democratic Primary Election, 2018
Party	Candidate	Votes	%
Democratic	Kathleen Dumais	8,207	22.4%
Democratic	Lily Qi	6,568	17.9%
Democratic	David Fraser-Hidalgo	6,206	16.9%
Democratic	Amy Frieder	5,289	14.4%
Democratic	Kevin Mack	4,257	11.6%
Democratic	Anis Ahmed	2,097	5.7%
Democratic	Andy Van Wye	2,032	5.5%
Democratic	Hamza Sarwar Khan	1,262	3.4%
Democratic	Tony Puca	776	2.1%

Maryland House of Delegates District 15 General Election, 2018
Party	Candidate	Votes	%
Democratic	Kathleen Dumais	36,331	24.6%
Democratic	Lily Qi	34,888	23.6%
Democratic	David Fraser-Hidalgo	33,808	22.9%
Republican	Laurie Halverson	15,678	10.6%
Republican	Harvey Jacobs	14,096	9.5%
Republican	Marc A. King	12,993	8.8%
	Other Write-Ins	139	0.1%

Female Delegate to the Democratic National Convention, District 6, 2020
Party	Candidate	Votes	%
Democratic	Nancy J. King (Biden)	62,804	22.8%
Democratic	Barbara Goldberg Goldman (Biden)	61,938	22.4%
Democratic	Karen Lewis Young (Biden)	61,341	22.2%
Democratic	Aesha Greer (Sanders)	13,512	4.9%
Democratic	Angela R. Lowry (Sanders)	13,057	4.7%
Democratic	Linda Wagner (Sanders)	12,418	4.5%
Democratic	Jessica Fitzwater (Warren)	6,252	2.3%
Democratic	Sophie Ehrlich (Warren)	5,826	2.1%
Democratic	Elise F. Goldstein (Warren)	5,022	1.8%
Democratic	Lily Qi (Buttigieg)	4,726	1.7%
Democratic	Suzanne Sable Beall (Yang)	3,111	1.1%
Democratic	Maria Lane (Buttigieg)	3,070	1.1%
Democratic	Ismatu F. Daramy (Yang)	2,622	1%
Democratic	Mary Ellen Mitchell (Buttigieg)	2,573	0.9%
Democratic	Maureen D. Grayzeck (Klobuchar)	2,468	0.9%
Democratic	Martha L. Kahn (Yang)	2,445	0.9%
Democratic	Mary Bierman (Bloomberg)	2,297	0.8%
Democratic	Venattia W. Vann (Uncommitted)	1,919	0.7%
Democratic	Myrna Whitworth (Klobuchar)	1,697	0.6%
Democratic	Elizabeth S. Stiefvater (Klobuchar)	1,630	0.6%
Democratic	Arlene Proebsting (Bloomberg)	1,021	0.4%
Democratic	Adrienne Oleck (Gabbard)	881	0.3%

Maryland House of Delegates District 15 General Election, 2022
Party	Candidate	Votes	%
Democratic	Lily Qi	31,145	24.5%
Democratic	Linda Foley	31,007	24.4%
Democratic	David Fraser-Hidalgo	30,229	23.8%
Republican	Stacey Sauter	11,969	9.4%
Republican	Matt Wade	11,330	8.9%
Republican	Jodi Colella Noah	11,087	8.7%
	Other Write-Ins	96	0.1%
