= 2016 United States House of Representatives elections in Maryland =

- November 8, 2016

All 8 Maryland seats to the United States House of Representatives
	Majority party	Minority party
Party	Democratic	Republican
Last election	7	1
Seats won	7	1
Seat change	Steady	Steady
Popular vote	1,636,281	962,307
Percentage	60.43%	35.54%
Swing	▲2.99%	▼5.82%

Democratic
50–60%
60–70%
70–80%
80–90%
Republican
40–50%
50–60%
60–70%
70–80%

The 2016 United States House of Representatives elections in Maryland were held on November 8, 2016, to elect the eight U.S. representatives from the state of Maryland, one from each of the state's eight congressional districts. The elections coincided with the 2016 U.S. presidential election, as well as other elections to the House of Representatives, elections to the United States Senate and various state and local elections. The primaries were held on April 26.

== Overview ==
2016 United States House of Representatives elections in Maryland
Party	Votes	Percentage	+/−	Seats	+/−
Democratic	1,636,281	60.43%	+2.99%	7	-
Republican	962,307	35.54%	−5.82%	1	-
Libertarian	60,492	2.23%	+1.71%		-
Green	44,405	1.64%	+1.10%		-
Others	4,260	0.16%	+0.02%		-
Totals	2,707,745	100.00%	-	8	-

Popular vote
Democratic	60.43%
Republican	35.54%
Other	4.03%

House seats
Democratic	87.50%
Republican	12.50%

== District 1 ==
2016 Maryland's 1st congressional district election
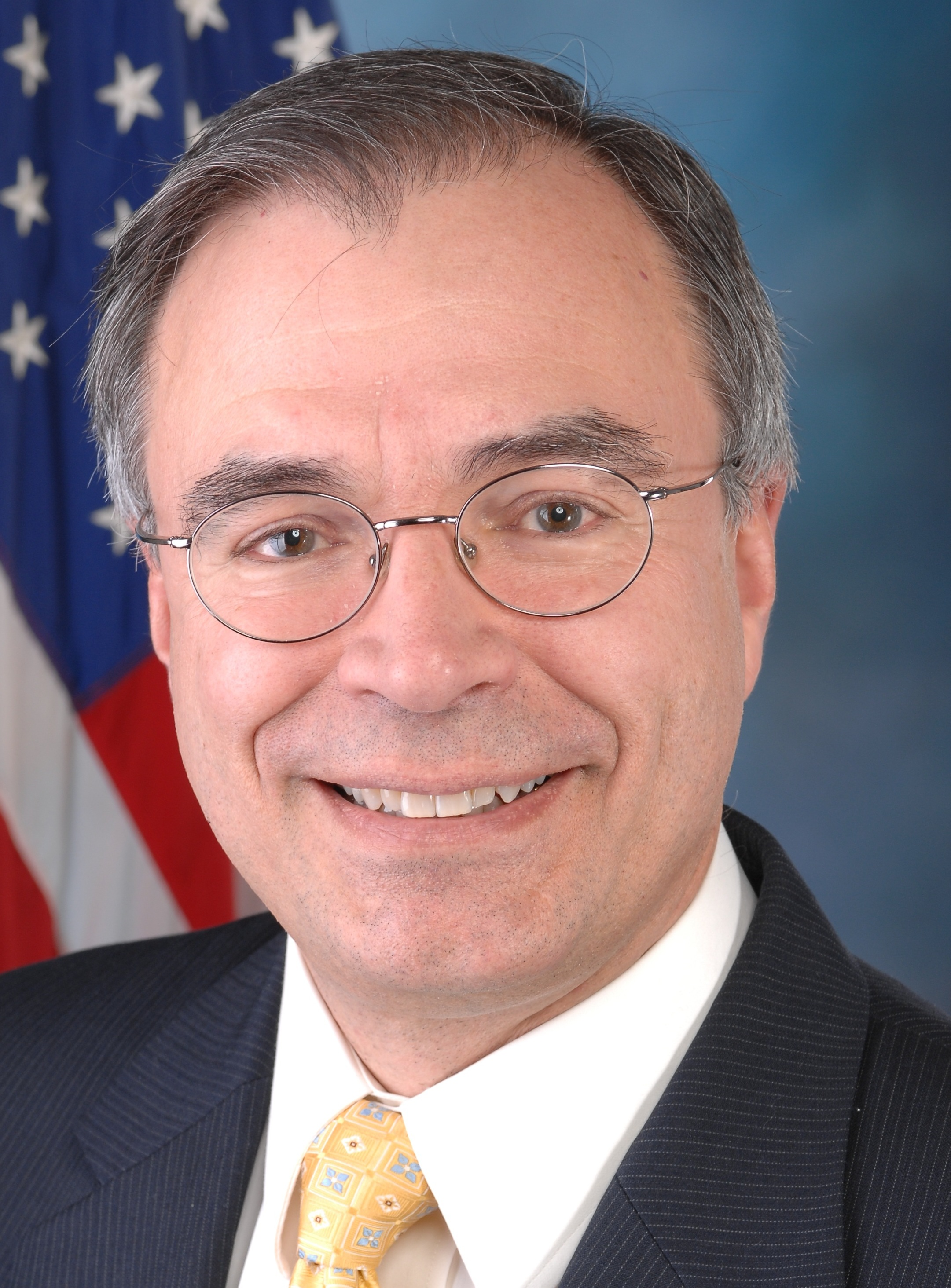

Nominee	Andy Harris	Joe Werner
Party	Republican	Democratic
Popular vote	242,574	103,622
Percentage	67.0%	28.6%
- Harris: 40–50% 50–60% 60–70% 70–80% 80–90% >90% Werner: 40–50% 50–60% 60–70% 70–80% 80–90% Tie: 40–50% No votes
U.S. Representative before election
Andy Harris
Republican
Elected U.S. Representative
Andy Harris
Republican

The 1st district includes the entire Eastern Shore of Maryland as well as parts of Baltimore, Harford and Carroll counties. The incumbent was Republican Andy Harris, who had represented the district since 2011. He was re-elected with 70% of the vote in 2014 and the district had a PVI of R+14.

=== Republican primary ===
Harris had considered a run for the U.S. Senate, but chose to seek reelection.

==== Candidates ====
===== Nominee =====
- Andy Harris, incumbent U.S. Representative

===== Eliminated in primary =====
- Jonathan Goff
- Sean Jackson
- Michael D. Smigiel Sr., former state delegate

===== Declined =====
- J. B. Jennings, state senator
- Kathy Szeliga, state delegate (running for the U.S. Senate)

==== Debate ====
2016 Maryland's 1st congressional district republican primary debate
No.	Date	Host	Moderator	Link	Republican	Republican	Republican	Republican
Key: P Participant A Absent N Not invited I Invited W Withdrawn								
Key: P Participant A Absent N Not invited I Invited W Withdrawn					Jonathan Goff Jr.	Andy Harris	Sean Jackson	Michael Smigiel Sr.
1	Apr. 13, 2016	Queen Anne's County; Republican Central Committee	Rick Bowers; Laura Nickman	YouTube	P	P	P	P

==== Primary results ====
Republican primary results
Party	Candidate	Votes	%
Republican	Andy Harris (incumbent)	79,497	78.4
Republican	Michael D. Smigiel Sr.	10,897	10.8
Republican	Jonathan Marvin Goff Jr.	6,135	6.0
Republican	Sean M. Jackson	4,891	4.8
Total votes		101,420	100.0

=== Democratic primary ===
==== Candidates ====
===== Nominee =====
- Joe Werner, attorney

===== Eliminated in primary =====
- Jim Ireton, Salisbury City Council member and former mayor of Salisbury

==== Primary results ====
Democratic primary results
Party	Candidate	Votes	%
Democratic	Joe Werner	29,729	51.0
Democratic	Jim Ireton	28,547	49.0
Total votes		58,276	100.0

=== Libertarian Party ===
==== Candidates ====
===== Nominee =====
- Matt Beers

=== General election ===
==== Predictions ====
Source	Ranking	As of
The Cook Political Report	Safe R	November 7, 2016
Daily Kos Elections	Safe R	November 7, 2016
Rothenberg	Safe R	November 3, 2016
Sabato's Crystal Ball	Safe R	November 7, 2016
RCP	Safe R	October 31, 2016

==== Results ====
2016 Maryland's 1st congressional district election
Party	Candidate	Votes	%
Republican	Andy Harris (incumbent)	242,574	67.0
Democratic	Joe Werner	103,622	28.6
Libertarian	Matt Beers	15,370	4.2
Write-in		531	0.1
Total votes		362,097	100.0
Republican hold			

== District 2 ==
2016 Maryland's 2nd congressional district election
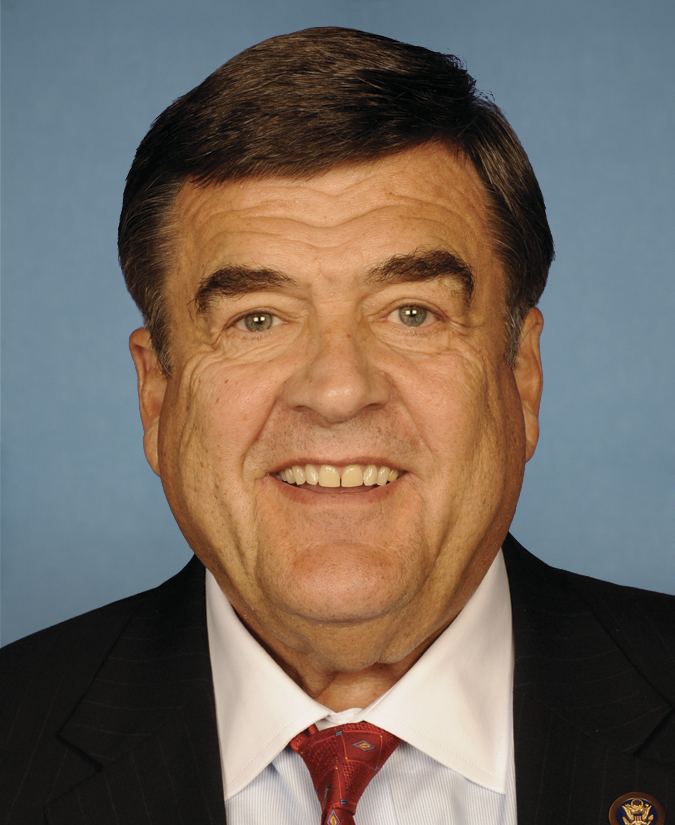

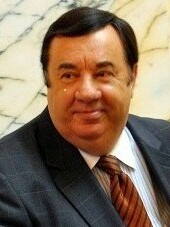
Nominee	Dutch Ruppersberger	Pat McDonough
Party	Democratic	Republican
Popular vote	192,183	102,577
Percentage	62.1%	33.1%
- Ruppersberger: 40–50% 50–60% 60–70% 70–80% 80–90% >90% McDonough: 40–50% 50–60% 60–70% 70–80% No votes
U.S. Representative before election
Dutch Ruppersberger
Democratic
Elected U.S. Representative
Dutch Ruppersberger
Democratic

The 2nd district includes parts of Howard, Harford, Baltimore and Anne Arundel counties, as well as small portions of the City of Baltimore. The incumbent is Democrat Dutch Ruppersberger, who has represented the district since 2003. He was re-elected with 61% of the vote in 2014 and the district has a PVI of D+10.

=== Democratic primary ===
Ruppersberger considered running for the U.S. Senate, but chose to seek reelection.

==== Candidates ====
===== Nominee =====
- Dutch Ruppersberger, incumbent U.S. Representative

==== Primary results ====
Democratic primary results
Party	Candidate	Votes	%
Democratic	Dutch Ruppersberger (incumbent)	89,820	100.0
Total votes		89,820	100.0

=== Republican primary ===
==== Candidates ====
===== Nominee =====
- Pat McDonough, state delegate

===== Eliminated in primary =====
- Bill Heine, project management specialist and candidate for the Anne Arundel County Council in 2014
- Carl Magee
- Yuripzy Morgan, attorney
- Mark Shell

==== Primary results ====
Republican primary results
Party	Candidate	Votes	%
Republican	Pat McDonough	28,397	71.4
Republican	Carl Magee Jr.	4,195	10.5
Republican	Bill Heine	3,203	8.1
Republican	Yuripzy Morgan	2,257	5.7
Republican	Mark Shell	1,709	4.3
Total votes		39,761	100.0

=== Libertarian Party ===
==== Candidates ====
===== Nominee =====
- Kristin Kasprzak

=== General election ===
==== Predictions ====
Source	Ranking	As of
The Cook Political Report	Safe D	November 7, 2016
Daily Kos Elections	Safe D	November 7, 2016
Rothenberg	Safe D	November 3, 2016
Sabato's Crystal Ball	Safe D	November 7, 2016
RCP	Safe D	October 31, 2016

==== Results ====
2016 Maryland's 2nd congressional district election
Party	Candidate	Votes	%
Democratic	Dutch Ruppersberger (incumbent)	192,183	62.1
Republican	Pat McDonough	102,577	33.1
Libertarian	Kristin S. Kasprzak	14,128	4.6
Write-in		592	0.2
Total votes		309,480	100.0
Democratic hold			

== District 3 ==
2016 Maryland's 3rd congressional district election
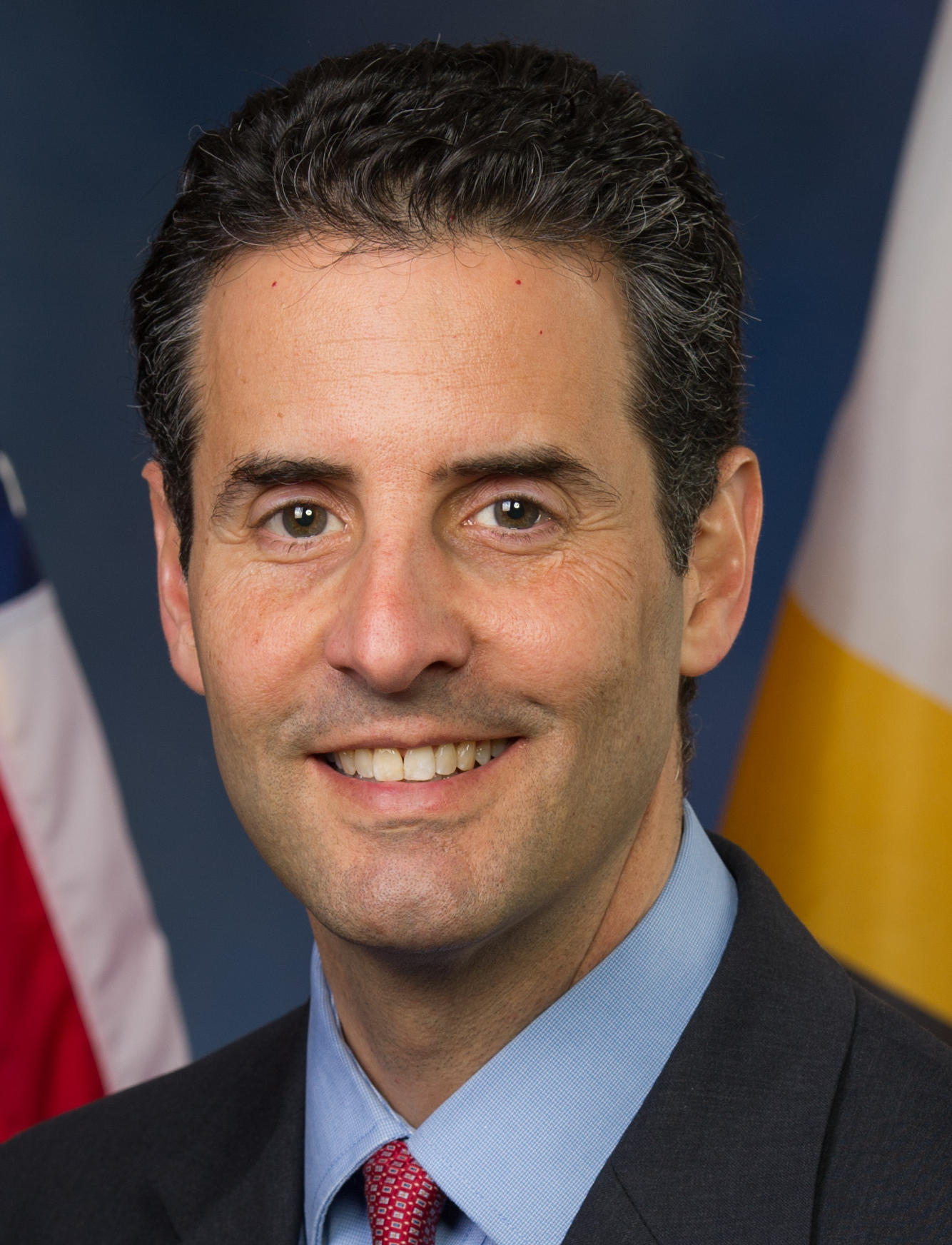

Nominee	John Sarbanes	Mark Plaster
Party	Democratic	Republican
Popular vote	214,640	115,048
Percentage	63.2%	33.9%
- Precinct results Sarbanes: 40–50% 50–60% 60–70% 70–80% 80–90% >90% Plaster: 40–50% 50–60% 60–70% No votes
U.S. Representative before election
John Sarbanes
Democratic
Elected U.S. Representative
John Sarbanes
Democratic

The 3rd district includes parts of Baltimore, Howard, Montgomery and Anne Arundel counties, as well as a significant part of the City of Baltimore. The incumbent is Democrat John Sarbanes, who has represented the district since 2007. He was re-elected with 60% of the vote in 2014 and the district has a PVI of D+9.

=== Democratic primary ===
Sarbanes considered running for the U.S. Senate, but decided to run for re-election instead. 2014 primary challenger Matthew Molyett had filed to run again, but withdrew.

==== Candidates ====
===== Nominee =====
- John Sarbanes, incumbent U.S. Representative

===== Eliminated in primary =====
- John Rea

===== Withdrawn =====
- Matthew Molyett

==== Primary results ====
Democratic primary results
Party	Candidate	Votes	%
Democratic	John Sarbanes (incumbent)	101,355	87.2
Democratic	John Rea	14,917	12.8
Total votes		116,272	100.0

=== Republican primary ===
==== Candidates ====
===== Nominee =====
- Mark Plaster, physician

===== Eliminated in primary =====
- Thomas Harris, perennial candidate

==== Primary results ====
Republican primary results
Party	Candidate	Votes	%
Republican	Mark Plaster	25,455	63.6
Republican	Thomas Harris	14,564	36.4
Total votes		40,019	100.0

=== Green Party ===
==== Candidates ====
===== Nominee =====
- Nnabu Eze

=== General election ===
==== Predictions ====
Source	Ranking	As of
The Cook Political Report	Safe D	November 7, 2016
Daily Kos Elections	Safe D	November 7, 2016
Rothenberg	Safe D	November 3, 2016
Sabato's Crystal Ball	Safe D	November 7, 2016
RCP	Safe D	October 31, 2016

==== Results ====
2016 Maryland's 3rd congressional district election
Party	Candidate	Votes	%
Democratic	John Sarbanes (incumbent)	214,640	63.2
Republican	Mark Plaster	115,048	33.9
Green	Nnabu Eze	9,461	2.8
Write-in		526	0.1
Total votes		339,675	100.0
Democratic hold			

== District 4 ==
2016 Maryland's 4th congressional district election
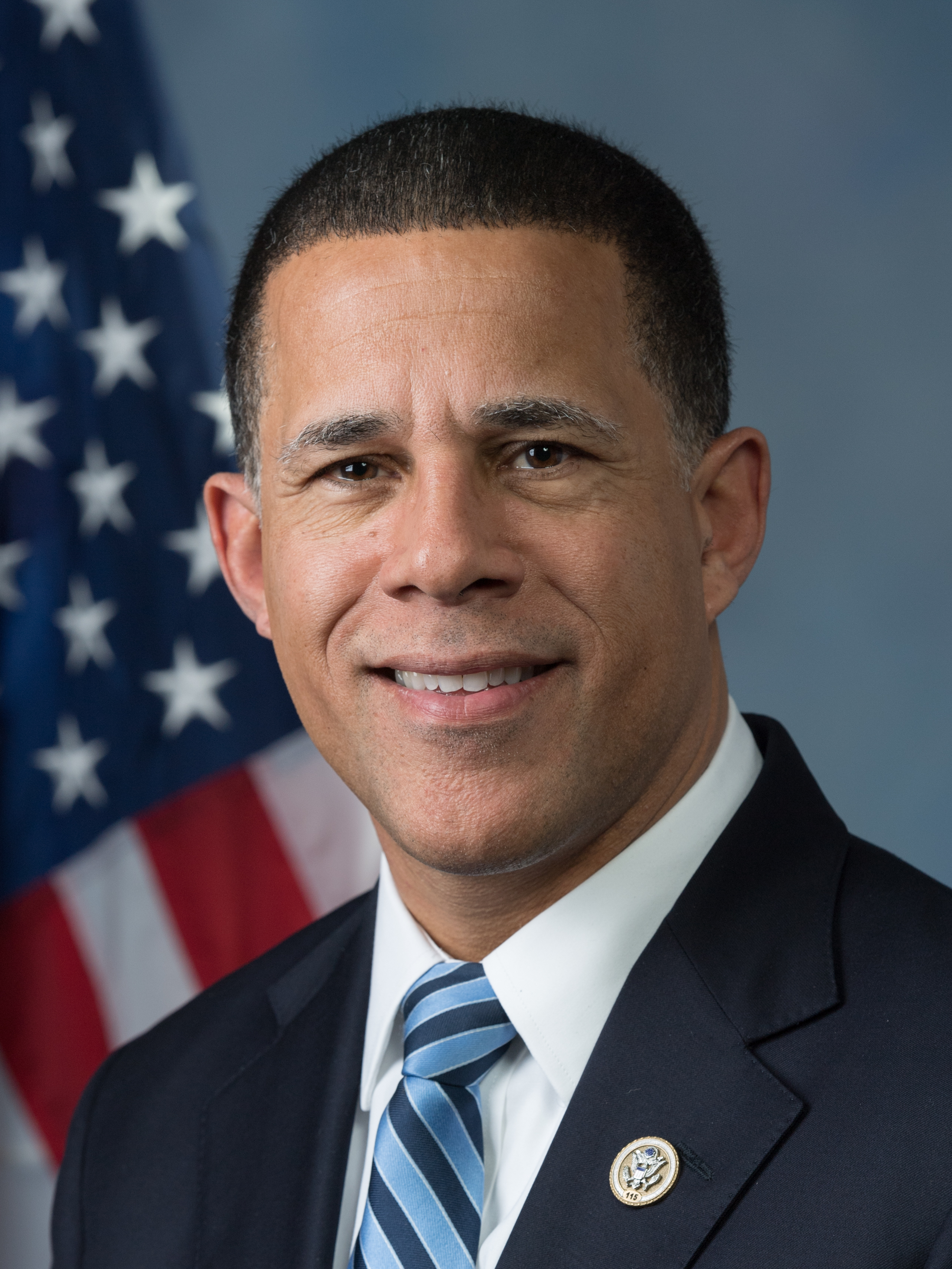

Nominee	Anthony Brown	George McDermott
Party	Democratic	Republican
Popular vote	237,501	68,670
Percentage	74.1%	21.4%
- Precinct results Brown: 40–50% 50–60% 60–70% 70–80% 80–90% >90% McDermott: 40–50% 50–60% 60–70% 70–80% No votes
U.S. Representative before election
Anthony Brown
Democratic
Elected U.S. Representative
Anthony Brown
Democratic

The 4th district includes parts of Prince George's, and Anne Arundel counties. The incumbent is Democrat Donna Edwards, who has represented the district since 2008. She was re-elected with 70% of the vote in 2014 and the district has a PVI of D+26.

=== Democratic primary ===
Edwards did not run for reelection, so that she could run for the United States Senate seat being vacated by Barbara Mikulski, who was retiring.

==== Candidates ====
===== Nominee =====
- Anthony Brown, former Lieutenant Governor and nominee for governor in 2014

===== Eliminated in primary =====
- Warren Christopher, retired United States Army lieutenant colonel and candidate for this seat in 2014
- Matthew Fogg, retired Chief Deputy U.S. Marshal and anti-racism and anti-corruption activist
- Glenn Ivey, former Prince George's County State Attorney and candidate for this seat in 2012
- Joseline Peña-Melnyk, state delegate
- Terence Strait

===== Withdrawn =====
- Dereck E. Davis, state delegate
- Lisa Ransom, political strategist and 2010 State Delegate candidate
- Alvin Thornton, former chair of the political science department at Howard University and chair of the Commission on Education Finance, Equity and Excellence
- Ingrid Turner, Prince George's County Councilmember

===== Declined =====
- Angela Alsobrooks, Prince George's County State's Attorney
- Rushern Baker, Prince George's County Executive
- Erek Barron, state delegate
- Jamie Benoit, Anne Arundel County councilman
- Aisha N. Braveboy, former state delegate and candidate for state attorney general in 2014
- Delman Coates, pastor and candidate for lieutenant governor in 2014
- Derrick Davis, Prince George's County Councilmember
- Donna Edwards, incumbent U.S. Representative (running for U.S. Senate)
- Andrea Harrison, Prince George's County Councilmember
- Jolene Ivey, former state delegate and candidate for lieutenant governor in 2014
- Michael A. Jackson, state delegate and former Prince George's County Sheriff
- C. Anthony Muse, state senator and candidate for the U.S. Senate in 2012
- Victor R. Ramirez, state senator
- Kris Valderrama, state delegate
- Michael L. Vaughn, state delegate
- Jay Walker, state delegate

===== Endorsements =====
Anthony Brown

Organizations

- VoteVets.org
Dereck Davis

State legislators

- Angela Angel, state delegate
- Vanessa E. Atterbeary, state delegate
- Charles E. Barkley, state delegate
- Darryl Barnes, state delegate
- Benjamin T. Brooks Jr., state delegate
- Ned Carey, state delegate
- William Frick, state delegate
- Cheryl Glenn, state delegate
- Sally Y. Jameson, state delegate
- Adrienne A. Jones, Speaker Pro Tem of the Maryland House of Delegates
- Benjamin F. Kramer, state delegate
- Mary Ann Lisanti, state delegate
- Will C. Smith Jr., state delegate
- Frank S. Turner, state delegate
- Joseph F. Vallario Jr., state delegate
- Michael L. Vaughn, state delegate
- Jay Walker, state delegate
- C. T. Wilson, state delegate

Local officials

- Derrick Davis, Prince George's County Councilmember
Glenn Ivey

State legislators

- Will Campos, former state delegate
- Victor R. Ramirez, state senator

Labor unions

- International Brotherhood of Electrical Workers Local 26

Local officials

- Rushern Baker, Prince George's County Executive
- Rocio Treminio-Lopez, Mayor of Brentwood
Joseline Peña-Melnyk

State legislators

- David Fraser-Hidalgo, state delegate
- Ana Sol Gutierrez, state delegate
- Roger Manno, state senator
- Marice Morales, state delegate
- Victor R. Ramirez, state senator
- Carlo Sanchez, state delegate

==== Primary results ====
Democratic primary results
Party	Candidate	Votes	%
Democratic	Anthony Brown	47,678	41.6
Democratic	Glenn Ivey	38,966	34.0
Democratic	Joseline Peña-Melnyk	21,724	19.0
Democratic	Warren Christopher	3,973	3.5
Democratic	Matthew Fogg	1,437	1.2
Democratic	Terence Strait	845	0.7
Total votes		114,623	100.0

=== Republican primary ===
==== Candidates ====
===== Nominee =====
- George McDermott, perennial candidate

===== Eliminated in primary =====
- Robert Broadus, candidate for the U.S. Senate in 2012
- Rob Buck
- David Therrien

==== Primary results ====
Republican primary results
Party	Candidate	Votes	%
Republican	George McDermott	10,882	45.8
Republican	David Therrien	6,219	26.1
Republican	Robert Broadus	3,977	16.7
Republican	Rob Buck	2,703	11.4
Total votes		23,781	100.0

=== Green Party ===
==== Candidates ====
===== Nominee =====
- Kamesha Clark

=== Libertarian primary ===
==== Candidates ====
===== Nominee =====
- Benjamin Lee Krause

=== General election ===
==== Predictions ====
Source	Ranking	As of
The Cook Political Report	Safe D	November 7, 2016
Daily Kos Elections	Safe D	November 7, 2016
Rothenberg	Safe D	November 3, 2016
Sabato's Crystal Ball	Safe D	November 7, 2016
RCP	Safe D	October 31, 2016

==== Results ====
2016 Maryland's 4th congressional district election
Party	Candidate	Votes	%
Democratic	Anthony Brown	237,501	74.1
Republican	George E. McDermott	68,670	21.4
Green	Kamesha T. Clark	8,204	2.6
Libertarian	Benjamin Lee Krause	5,744	1.8
Write-in		531	0.2
Total votes		320,650	100.0
Democratic hold			

== District 5 ==
2016 Maryland's 5th congressional district election
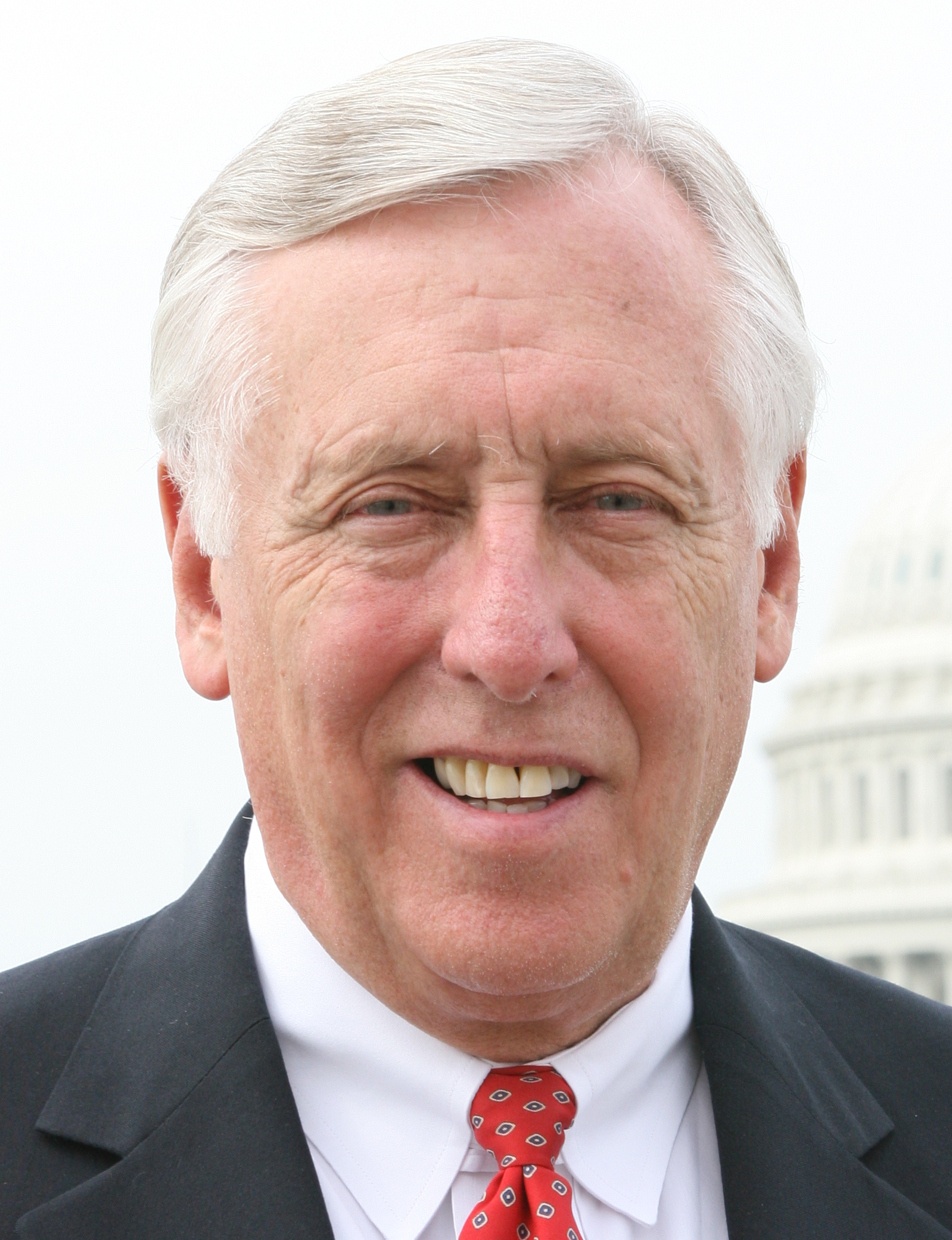

Nominee	Steny Hoyer	Mark Arness
Party	Democratic	Republican
Popular vote	242,989	105,931
Percentage	67.4%	29.4%
- Precinct results Hoyer: 40–50% 50–60% 60–70% 70–80% 80–90% >90% Arness: 40–50% 50–60% 60–70% No votes
U.S. Representative before election
Steny Hoyer
Democratic
Elected U.S. Representative
Steny Hoyer
Democratic

The 5th district includes all of Charles, St. Mary's, and Calvert counties, as well as portions of Prince George's and Anne Arundel counties. The incumbent is Democrat Steny Hoyer, the House Minority Whip, who has represented the district since 1981. He was re-elected with 64% of the vote in 2014 and the district has a PVI of D+14.

=== Democratic primary ===
==== Candidates ====
===== Nominee =====
- Steny Hoyer, incumbent U.S. Representative

===== Eliminated in primary =====
- Kristin Beck, former United States Navy SEAL
- Debbie Wilson

==== Primary results ====
Democratic primary results
Party	Candidate	Votes	%
Democratic	Steny Hoyer (incumbent)	83,787	75.9
Democratic	Kristin Beck	13,320	12.1
Democratic	Debbie Wilson	13,304	12.0
Total votes		110,411	100.0

=== Republican primary ===
==== Candidates ====
===== Nominee =====
- Mark Arness, physician and candidate for this seat in 2014

===== Eliminated in primary =====
- Charles Sam Faddis, retired CIA officer

==== Primary results ====
Republican primary results
Party	Candidate	Votes	%
Republican	Mark Arness	22,613	53.3
Republican	Charles Sam Faddis	19,846	46.7
Total votes		42,459	100.0

=== General election ===
==== Predictions ====
Source	Ranking	As of
The Cook Political Report	Safe D	November 7, 2016
Daily Kos Elections	Safe D	November 7, 2016
Rothenberg	Safe D	November 3, 2016
Sabato's Crystal Ball	Safe D	November 7, 2016
RCP	Safe D	October 31, 2016

==== Results ====
2016 Maryland's 5th congressional district election
Party	Candidate	Votes	%
Democratic	Steny Hoyer (incumbent)	242,989	67.4
Republican	Mark Arness	105,931	29.4
Libertarian	Jason Summers	11,078	3.1
Write-in		636	0.2
Total votes		360,634	100.0
Democratic hold			

== District 6 ==
2016 Maryland's 6th congressional district election
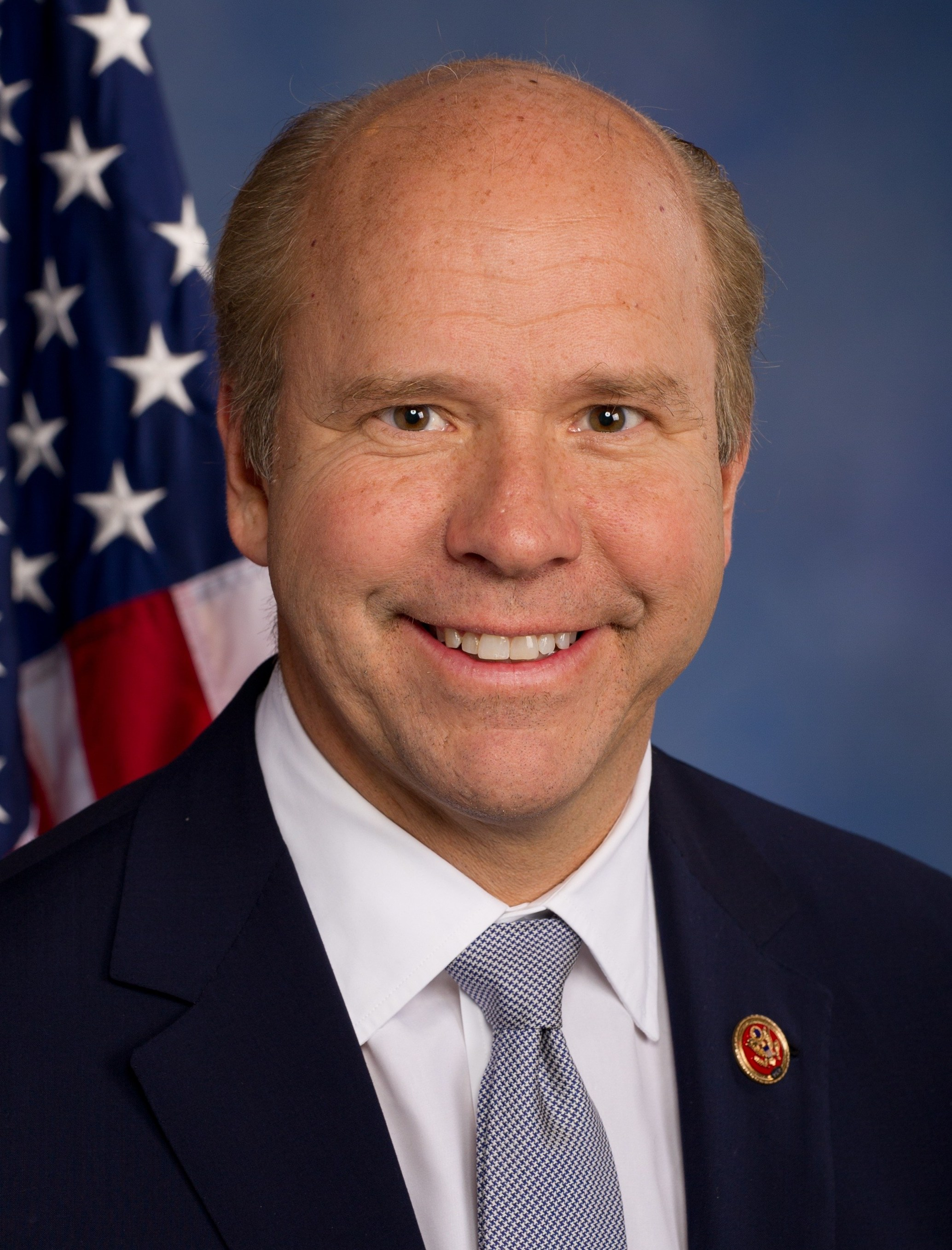

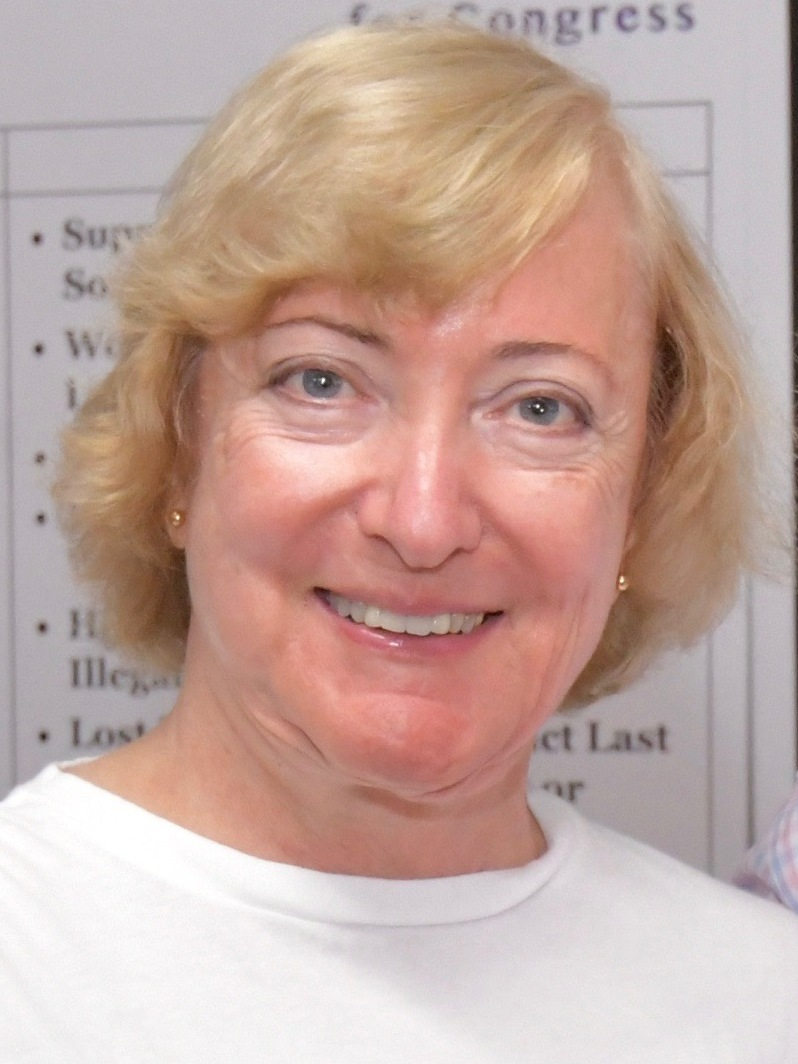
Nominee	John Delaney	Amie Hoeber
Party	Democratic	Republican
Popular vote	185,770	133,081
Percentage	56.0%	40.1%
- Precinct results Delaney: 40–50% 50–60% 60–70% 70–80% 80–90% >90% Hoeber: 40–50% 50–60% 60–70% 70–80% 80–90% >90% No votes
U.S. Representative before election
John Delaney
Democratic
Elected U.S. Representative
John Delaney
Democratic

The 6th district includes the entire Maryland Panhandle including all of Garrett, Allegany and Washington counties as well as portions of Montgomery and Frederick counties. The incumbent is Democrat John Delaney, who has represented the district since 2013. He was re-elected with 50% of the vote in 2014 and the district has a PVI of D+4.

=== Democratic primary ===
Delaney considered running for the U.S. Senate, but chose to seek reelection.

==== Candidates ====
===== Nominee =====
- John Delaney, incumbent U.S. Representative

===== Eliminated in primary =====
- Tony Puca

===== Declined =====
- Kumar Barve, state delegate and former majority leader of the Maryland House of Delegates (running for MD-08)
- John P. Donoghue, former state delegate
- Brian Feldman, state senator
- William Frick, state delegate
- Rob Garagiola, former state senator and candidate for this seat in 2012
- Roger Manno, state senator
- Kirill Reznik, state delegate
- Craig L. Rice, Montgomery County Councilman
- Mark Shriver, former state delegate and candidate for MD-08 in 2002

==== Primary results ====
Democratic primary results
Party	Candidate	Votes	%
Democratic	John Delaney (incumbent)	69,343	84.9
Democratic	Tony Puca	12,317	15.1
Total votes		81,660	100.0

=== Republican primary ===
==== Candidates ====
===== Nominee =====
- Amie Hoeber, businesswoman and former Deputy Under Secretary of the Army

===== Eliminated in primary =====
- Terry Baker, president of the Washington County Board of County Commissioners
- Scott Cheng, physician, college instructor, and 2014 State House candidate
- Robin Ficker, former state delegate, candidate for U.S. Senate in 2000, and candidate for this seat in 2012
- Frank Howard, businessman and 2014 state senate candidate
- Christopher Mason, carpenter and 2014 Frederick County Council candidate
- Harold Painter, certified public accountant and candidate for this seat in 2014
- David E. Vogt III, State Delegate

===== Declined =====
- Kathy Afzali, state delegate and candidate for this seat in 2012
- Augustus Alzona, tax consultant, candidate for Comptroller of Maryland in 2002, and candidate for MD-08 in 2012
- Dan Bongino, former United States Secret Service agent, candidate for U.S. Senate in 2012 and nominee for this seat in 2014 (moved to Florida)
- Thomas Ferleman, business management consultant
- Mike McKay, state delegate
- Neil Parrott, state delegate

===== Endorsements =====
Dave Vogt

State legislators

- Steve Arentz, state delegate
- Jason Buckel, state delegate
- John Cluster, state delegate
- Mark Fisher, state delegate
- Robin Grammer, state delegate
- Kevin Hornberger, state delegate
- Seth Howard, state delegate
- Jay Jacobs, state delegate
- Bob Long, state delegate
- Tony McConkey, state delegate
- Mike McKay, state delegate
- Ric Metzgar, state delegate
- Matt Morgan, state delegate
- Teresa Reilly, state delegate
- Deb Rey, state delegate
- Sid Saab, state delegate
- Haven Shoemaker, state delegate
- Steve Waugh, state senator
- Chris West, state delegate
- Brett Wilson, state delegate

==== Primary results ====
Republican primary results
Party	Candidate	Votes	%
Republican	Amie Hoeber	17,967	29.3
Republican	Terry L. Baker	13,837	22.6
Republican	Frank Howard	10,677	17.4
Republican	Robin Ficker	7,014	11.5
Republican	David E. Vogt III	5,774	9.4
Republican	Christopher James Mason	2,590	4.2
Republican	Scott Cheng	2,303	3.8
Republican	Harold Painter	1,117	1.8
Total votes		61,279	100.0

=== Green Party ===
==== Candidates ====
===== Nominee =====
- George Gluck

=== Polling ===
Poll source	Date(s) administered	Sample size	Margin of error	John Delaney (D)	Amie Hoeber (R)	Undecided
Garin-Hart-Yang Research Group (D-Delaney)	May 23–25, 2016	400	± 5.0%	59%	31%	10%

=== General election ===
==== Predictions ====
Source	Ranking	As of
The Cook Political Report	Likely D	November 7, 2016
Daily Kos Elections	Safe D	November 7, 2016
Rothenberg	Safe D	November 3, 2016
Sabato's Crystal Ball	Safe D	November 7, 2016
RCP	Likely D	October 31, 2016

==== Results ====
2016 Maryland's 6th congressional district election
Party	Candidate	Votes	%
Democratic	John Delaney (incumbent)	185,770	56.0
Republican	Amie Hoeber	133,081	40.1
Libertarian	David L. Howser	6,889	2.1
Green	George Gluck	5,824	1.8
Write-in		409	0.1
Total votes		331,973	100.0
Democratic hold			

== District 7 ==
2016 Maryland's 7th congressional district election
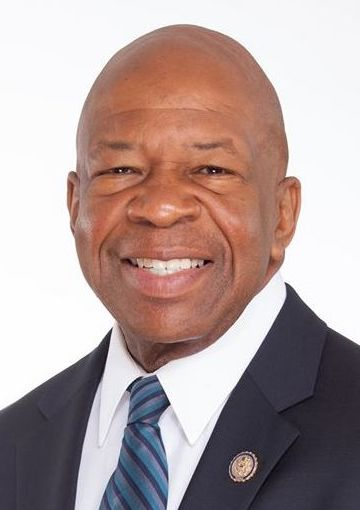

Nominee	Elijah Cummings	Corrogan Vaughn
Party	Democratic	Republican
Popular vote	238,838	69,556
Percentage	74.9%	21.8%
- Precinct results Cummings: 40–50% 50–60% 60–70% 70–80% 80–90% >90% Vaughn: 40–50% 50–60% 60–70% No votes
U.S. Representative before election
Elijah Cummings
Democratic
Elected U.S. Representative
Elijah Cummings
Democratic

The 7th district includes just over half of the City of Baltimore, most of the majority African American sections of Baltimore County, and the majority of Howard County, Maryland. The incumbent is Democrat Elijah Cummings, who has represented the district since 1996. He was re-elected with 70% of the vote in 2014 and the district has a PVI of D+24.

=== Democratic primary ===
Cummings considered running for the U.S. Senate, but chose to seek reelection.

==== Candidates ====
===== Nominee =====
- Elijah Cummings, incumbent U.S. Representative

===== Eliminated in primary =====
- Adrian Petrus

===== Withdrawn =====
- Jamal Bryant, pastor

===== Declined =====
- Calvin Ball, Howard County council member
- Talmadge Branch, state delegate
- Lisa Gladden, state senator

==== Primary results ====
Democratic primary results
Party	Candidate	Votes	%
Democratic	Elijah Cummings (incumbent)	130,555	92.1
Democratic	Adrian Petrus	11,272	7.9
Total votes		141,827	100.0

=== Republican primary ===
==== Candidates ====
===== Nominee =====
- Corrogan Vaughn, perennial candidate

===== Eliminated in primary =====
- Ray Bly, perennial candidate
- Wayne T. Newton

==== Primary results ====
Republican primary results
Party	Candidate	Votes	%
Republican	Corrogan R. Vaughn	10,645	41.6
Republican	Wayne T. Newton	10,599	41.4
Republican	Ray Bly	4,351	17.0
Total votes		25,595	100.0

=== Green Party ===
==== Candidates ====
===== Nominee =====
- Myles Hoenig

=== Libertarian Party ===
==== Candidates ====
===== Withdrawn =====
- Scott Soffen

=== Independents ===
==== Candidates ====
===== Withdrawn =====
- Andre Odell Kersey

=== General election ===
==== Predictions ====
Source	Ranking	As of
The Cook Political Report	Safe D	November 7, 2016
Daily Kos Elections	Safe D	November 7, 2016
Rothenberg	Safe D	November 3, 2016
Sabato's Crystal Ball	Safe D	November 7, 2016
RCP	Safe D	October 31, 2016

==== Results ====
2016 Maryland's 7th congressional district election
Party	Candidate	Votes	%
Democratic	Elijah Cummings (incumbent)	238,838	74.9
Republican	Corrogan R. Vaughn	69,556	21.8
Green	Myles B. Hoenig	9,715	3.0
Write-in		601	0.2
Republican	Wayne T. Newton (write-in)	202	0.1
Total votes		318,912	100.0
Democratic hold			

== District 8 ==
2016 Maryland's 8th congressional district election
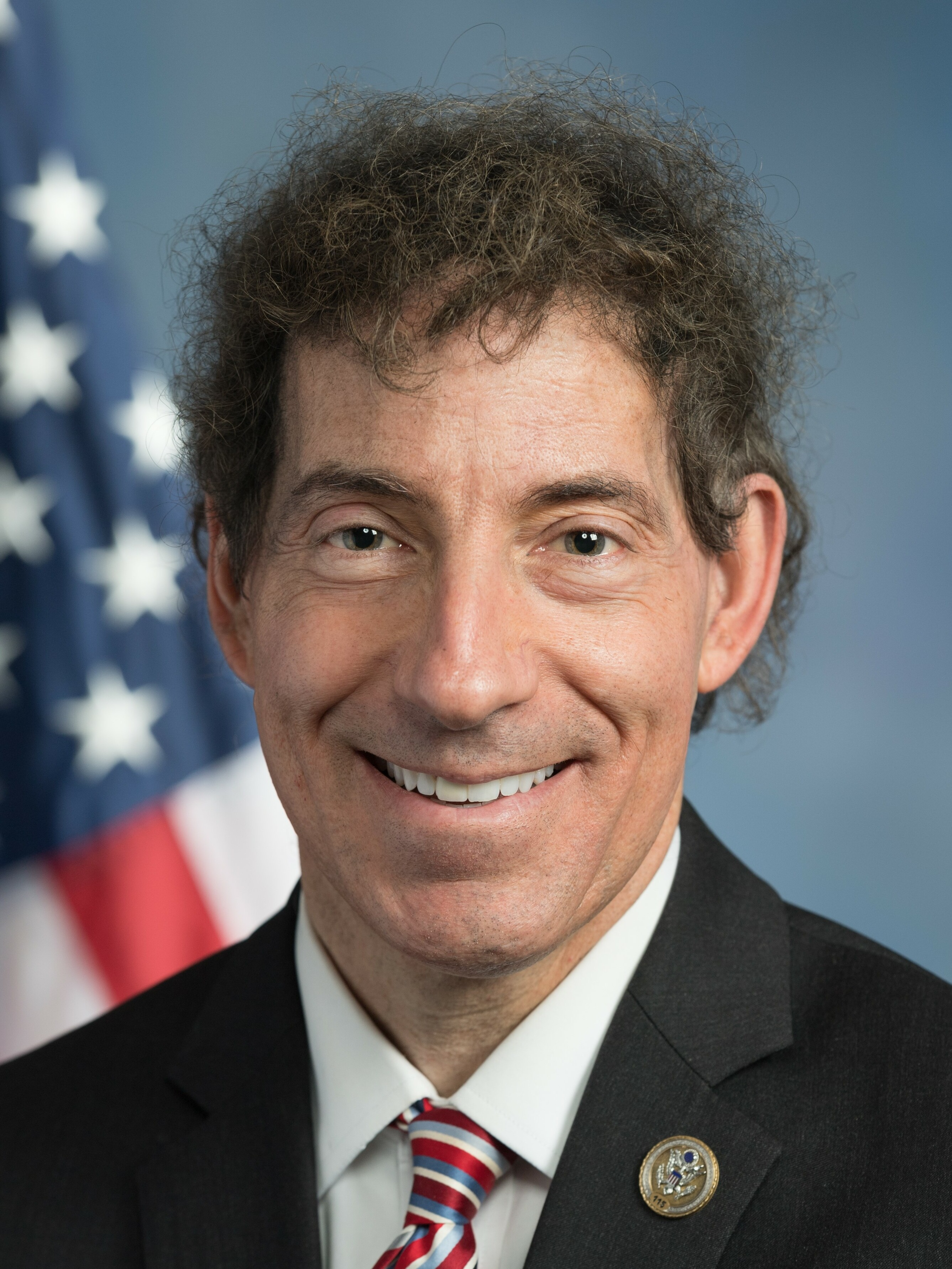

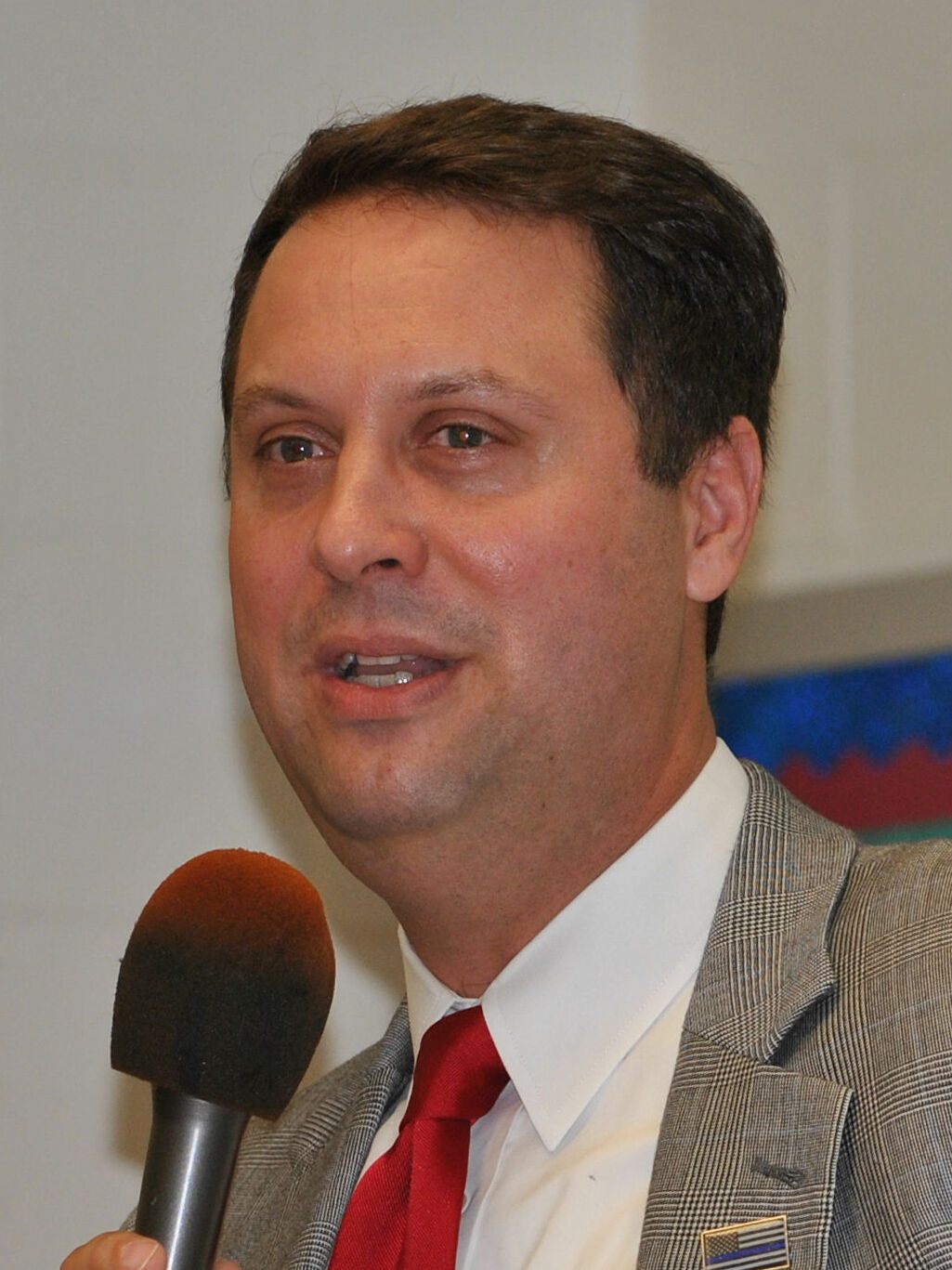
Nominee	Jamie Raskin	Dan Cox
Party	Democratic	Republican
Popular vote	220,657	124,651
Percentage	60.6%	34.2%
- Precinct results Raskin: 40–50% 50–60% 60–70% 70–80% 80–90% >90% Cox: 40–50% 50–60% 60–70% 70–80% No votes
U.S. Representative before election
Chris Van Hollen
Democratic
Elected U.S. Representative
Jamie Raskin
Democratic

The 8th district includes parts of Carroll, Frederick and Montgomery counties. The incumbent is Democrat Chris Van Hollen, who has represented the district since 2003. He was re-elected with 61% of the vote in 2014 and the district has a PVI of D+11.

=== Democratic primary ===
Van Hollen did not run for reelection, so that he could run for the United States Senate seat being vacated by Barbara Mikulski, who was retiring.

==== Candidates ====
===== Nominee =====
- Jamie Raskin, state senator

===== Eliminated in primary =====
- David M. Anderson, senior vice president at the Washington Center and adjunct faculty member at Johns Hopkins University
- Kumar Barve, state delegate and former majority leader of the Maryland House of Delegates
- Dan Bolling
- Ana Sol Gutierrez, state delegate
- Will Jawando, former Congressional and White House aide and 2014 State Delegate candidate
- Kathleen Matthews, Marriott International executive and former news anchor
- Joel Martin Rubin, former State Department official and founding political and government affairs director at J Street
- David Trone, founder and president of Total Wine & More

===== Withdrawn =====
- Valerie Ervin, former Montgomery County Councilwoman

===== Declined =====
- Roger Berliner, Montgomery County Councilman
- William A. Bronrott, former state delegate and former Deputy Administrator of the Federal Motor Carrier Safety Administration
- Doug Duncan, former Montgomery County Executive
- Nancy Floreen, Montgomery City Councilwoman
- Peter Franchot, State Comptroller
- Jan Gardner, Frederick County Executive
- William Frick, state delegate
- Cheryl Kagan, state senator
- Ariana Kelly, state delegate
- Susan C. Lee, state senator
- George Leventhal, Montgomery County Councilman
- Rich Madaleno, state senator
- Tom Manatos, former Congressional staffer
- Roger Manno, state senator
- Heather Mizeur, former state delegate and candidate for governor in 2014
- Nancy Navarro, Montgomery County Councilwoman
- Josh Rales, businessman and candidate for U.S. Senate in 2006
- Oscar Ramirez, former Vice Chair of the Maryland Democratic Party
- Craig L. Rice, Montgomery County Councilman
- Hans Riemer, Montgomery County Councilman
- Luiz R. S. Simmons, state delegate
- Susan Turnbull, former chair of the Maryland Democratic Party
- Chris Van Hollen, incumbent U.S. Representative (running for U.S. Senate)
- Jeff Waldstreicher, state delegate

===== Endorsements =====
Kumar Barve

U.S. Representatives

- Ami Bera, U.S. Representative (D-CA)

State legislators

- Pamela Beidle, state delegate
- Talmadge Branch, state delegate
- Michael E. Busch, Speaker of the Maryland House of Delegates
- Galen R. Clagett, former state delegate
- Jennie M. Forehand, former state senator
- David Fraser-Hidalgo, state delegate
- Barbara A. Frush, state delegate
- James W. Gilchrist, state delegate
- Anne Healey, state delegate
- Marvin E. Holmes Jr., state delegate
- John Hurson, former state delegate
- Adrienne A. Jones, Speaker Pro Tem of the Maryland House of Delegates
- Carol Krimm, state delegate
- Stephen W. Lafferty, state delegate
- Clarence Lam, state delegate
- Eric Luedtke, state delegate
- Cory McCray, state delegate
- Aruna Miller, state delegate
- R. Clayton Mitchell Jr., former Speaker of the Maryland House of Delegates
- Carol Petzold, former state delegate
- Andrew Platt, state delegate
- Shane Robinson, state delegate
- Dana Stein, state delegate
- Casper Taylor, former Speaker of the Maryland House of Delegates
- Joseph F. Vallario Jr., state delegate
- Craig Zucker, state delegate

Local officials

- Peter Benjamin, Mayor of Garrett Park
- Alan Cheung, former Montgomery County Board of Education member
- Greg Pecoraro, Westminster Town Councilman
Will Jawando

U.S. Representatives

- Elijah Cummings, U.S. Representative (D-MD)
- John Lewis, U.S. Representative (D-GA)
Kathleen Matthews

U.S. Representatives

- Cheri Bustos, U.S. Representative (IL-17)
- Katherine Clark, U.S. Representative (MA-05)
- Debbie Dingell, U.S. Representative (MI-12)
- Anna Eshoo, U.S. Representative (CA-18)
- Lois Frankel, U.S. Representative (FL-22)
- Ann McLane Kuster, U.S. Representative (NH-02)
Jamie Raskin

U.S. Representatives

- John Conyers, U.S. Representative (D-MI)
- John Sarbanes, U.S. Representative (D-MD)

Statewide officials

- Brian Frosh, Attorney General of Maryland
- Doug Gansler, former Attorney General of Maryland and candidate for Governor in 2014

State legislators

- John Astle, state senator
- James Brochin, state senator
- James E. DeGrange Sr., state senator
- Sheila Hixson, state delegate
- Nancy J. King, state senator
- Susan C. Lee, state senator
- Karen Lewis Young, state delegate
- Richard Madaleno, state senator
- Nathaniel McFadden, President Pro Tempore of the Maryland Senate
- Thomas M. Middleton, state senator
- Karen S. Montgomery, state senator
- David Moon, state delegate
- Douglas J. J. Peters, state senator
- Paul G. Pinsky, state senator
- Catherine Pugh, majority leader of the Maryland Senate and president of the National Black Caucus of State Legislators
- Victor R. Ramirez, state senator
- James Rosapepe, state senator and former United States Ambassador to Romania
- Will Smith, state delegate
- Ronald N. Young, state senator
- Robert Zirkin, state senator

Newspapers

- Washington Jewish Week

Local officials

- Roger Berliner, Montgomery County Councilman
- Marc Elrich, Montgomery County Councilman
- George Leventhal, Montgomery County Councilman
- Hans Riemer, Montgomery County Councilman
- Bruce Williams, Mayor of Takoma Park
Joel Martin Rubin

U.S. Representatives

- Jan Schakowsky, U.S. Representative (D-IL)

==== Primary results ====
Democratic primary results
Party	Candidate	Votes	%
Democratic	Jamie Raskin	43,776	33.6
Democratic	David Trone	35,400	27.2
Democratic	Kathleen Matthews	31,186	23.9
Democratic	Ana Sol Gutierrez	7,185	5.5
Democratic	Will Jawando	6,058	4.6
Democratic	Kumar Barve	3,149	2.4
Democratic	David M. Anderson	1,511	1.2
Democratic	Joel Martin Rubin	1,426	1.1
Democratic	Dan Bolling	712	0.5
Total votes		130,403	100.0

=== Republican primary ===
==== Candidates ====
===== Nominee =====
- Dan Cox, former aide to Alan Keyes

===== Eliminated in primary =====
- Jeffrey W. Jones
- Liz Matory, business consultant and Democratic candidate for state delegate in 2014
- Aryeh Shudofsky
- Shelly Skolnick

===== Declined =====
- Augustus Alzona, tax consultant, candidate for Comptroller of Maryland in 2002, and candidate for MD-08 in 2012
- James Calderwood, attorney, chair of the Maryland Transportation Commission and founding director of the Maryland Public Policy Institute
- Bill Day, attorney
- Frank Howard, businessman and 2014 State Senate candidate (running for district 6 instead)

==== Primary results ====
Republican primary results
Party	Candidate	Votes	%
Republican	Dan Cox	20,647	44.4
Republican	Jeffrey W. Jones	9,343	20.1
Republican	Liz Matory	7,295	15.7
Republican	Shelly Skolnick	5,835	12.5
Republican	Aryeh Shudofsky	3,421	7.3
Total votes		46,541	100.0

=== Green Party ===
==== Candidates ====
===== Nominee =====
- Nancy Wallace

===== Eliminated in primary =====
- Elizabeth Croyden
- Charles Galloway

==== Primary results ====
Green primary results
Party	Candidate	Votes	%
Green	Nancy Wallace	45	84.9
Green	Elizabeth Croyden	6	11.3
Green	Charles Galloway	2	3.8
Total votes		53	100.0

=== Libertarian primary ===
==== Candidates ====
===== Nominee =====
- Jasen Wunder

=== Independents ===
==== Withdrawn ====
- Liz Matory, business consultant and Democratic candidate for State Delegate in 2014 (running as a Republican)

=== General election ===
==== Predictions ====
Source	Ranking	As of
The Cook Political Report	Safe D	November 7, 2016
Daily Kos Elections	Safe D	November 7, 2016
Rothenberg	Safe D	November 3, 2016
Sabato's Crystal Ball	Safe D	November 7, 2016
RCP	Safe D	October 31, 2016

==== Results ====
2016 Maryland's 8th congressional district election
Party	Candidate	Votes	%
Democratic	Jamie Raskin	220,657	60.6
Republican	Dan Cox	124,651	34.2
Green	Nancy Wallace	11,201	3.1
Libertarian	Jasen Wunder	7,283	2.0
Write-in		532	0.1
Total votes		364,324	100.0
Democratic hold			
