= Chris Beck (Navy SEAL) =

Detransitioned Navy SEAL (born 1966)

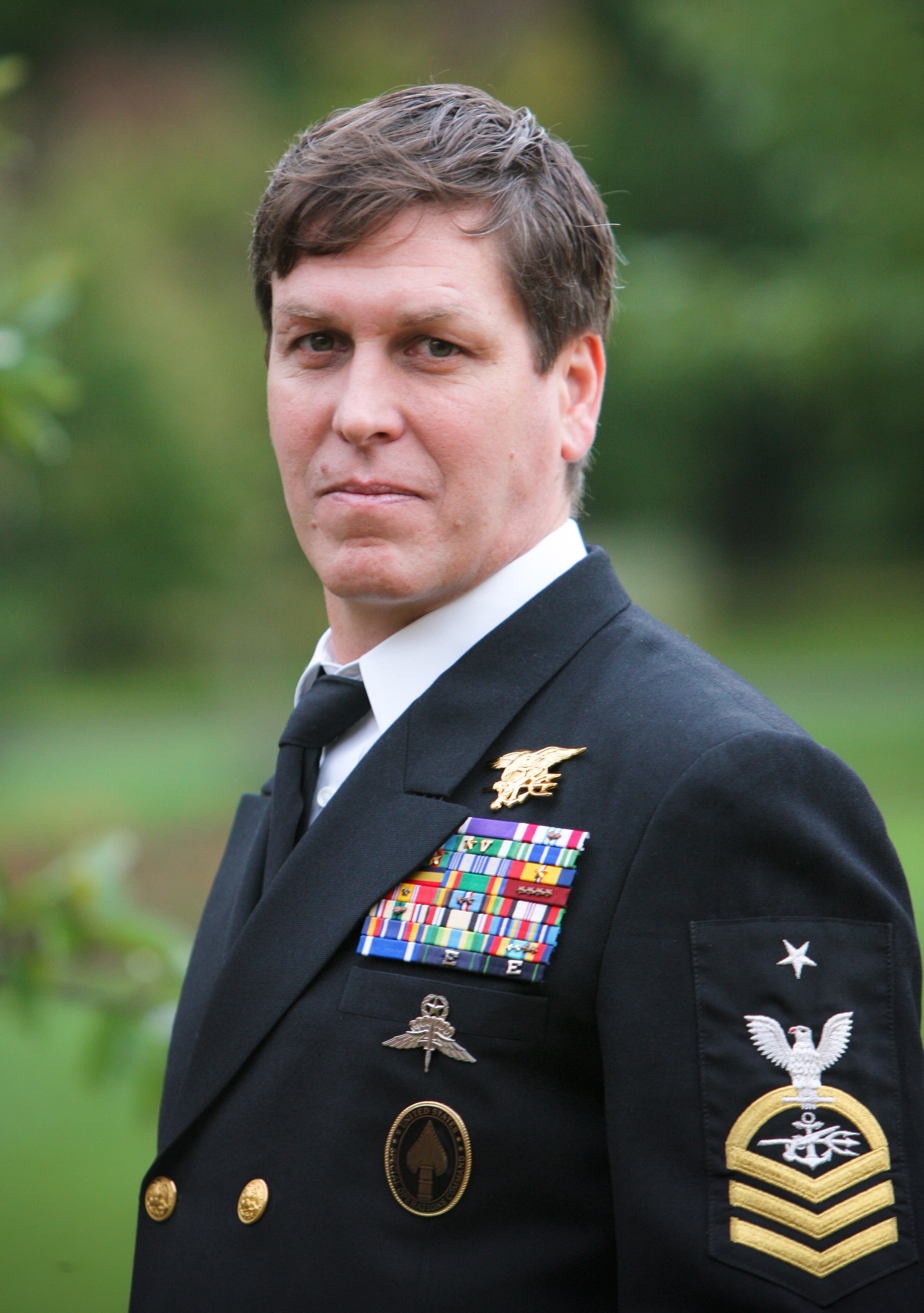
- Beck in September 2011
- Born: Christopher Todd Beck; June 21, 1966 (age 60); Long Island, New York, U.S.
- Military career
- Allegiance: United States
- Branch: United States Navy
- Service years: 1990–2011
- Rank: Senior chief petty officer
- Units: United States Navy SEALs; SEAL Team 1; DEVGRU ("SEAL Team Six")
- Awards: Bronze Star with Combat Distinguishing Device; Purple Heart; Defense Meritorious Service Medal (2)
- Other work: Author

Christopher Todd Beck (born June 21, 1966) is a retired United States Navy SEAL who gained public attention in 2013 after coming out as a trans woman, and in 2022, when he announced his detransition. During the time of his transition, he went by the name Kristin Beck. A memoir detailing his experience was published in June 2013, Warrior Princess: A U.S. Navy SEAL's Journey to Coming out Transgender. He served in the U.S. Navy for twenty years. In December 2022, Beck announced that he had detransitioned because "it ruined my life" and due to his conversion to Christianity.

== Early life and education ==
Beck grew up on a farm. As early as the age of five, he was drawn to feminine clothes and toys, but was encouraged to adopt masculine roles by his parents. Before transitioning, he married twice, and he has two sons from his first marriage. He recounts in his memoir how his gender dysphoria contributed to his inability to emotionally mature while being in a male body, adding conflict to his sexual identity, although he never really felt gay. Additionally, his duties as a U.S. Navy SEAL kept him on missions away from home, which distanced him from family members. Before enlisting in the United States Navy, Beck attended Virginia Military Institute from 1984 through 1987.

== Career ==
=== United States Navy ===
Beck served for 20 years in the U.S. Navy SEALs, taking part in 13 deployments, including seven combat deployments. Beck completed Basic Underwater Demolition/SEAL (BUD/S) training with class 179 in 1991 and subsequently served with SEAL Team One. Following SEAL Tactical Training (STT) and completion of six month probationary period, Beck received the Navy Enlisted Classification (NEC) 5326 as a Combatant Swimmer (SEAL), entitled to wear the Special Warfare Insignia. Beck eventually served as a member of the United States Naval Special Warfare Development Group (also known as DEVGRU), a special counter-terrorism unit popularly called SEAL Team Six, and received multiple military awards and decorations, including a Bronze Star and a Purple Heart. He told Anderson Cooper he wanted to be a SEAL because they were the "toughest of the tough".

Beck retired from the Navy in 2011 with final rating as Senior Chief Special Warfare Operator when he began transitioning by dressing as a woman. In 2013, he began hormone therapy, preparing himself for sex reassignment surgery. During an interview with Anderson Cooper in early June 2013, he stated that he never came out during his military career and that "No one ever met the real me". After coming out publicly in 2013 by posting a photo of himself as a woman on LinkedIn, he received a number of messages of support from his former military colleagues.

=== Warrior Princess ===
Beck said that his private therapy sessions were exploited by this therapist. Beck co-wrote Warrior Princess with Anne Speckhard, a psychologist at the Georgetown University School of Medicine. Speckhard was doing a study on resilience of the U.S. Navy SEALs, focusing on the coping mechanisms employed by SEALs to deal with their intense job demands. Speckhard first met Beck at a counter-terrorism conference. After Beck agreed to discuss coping mechanisms, a follow-up meeting took place in a gay bar, with Beck now dressed in feminine attire, to Speckhard's surprise. A five-hour meeting led to Speckhard agreeing to help Beck write his life story.

In the book, Speckhard notes that Beck had a desire to die honorably "so that he wouldn't have to wrestle anymore with the emotional pain that stemmed from the lack of congruency between his gender identity and body". In his introduction to the book, Beck writes:

I do not believe a soul has a gender, but my new path is making my soul complete and happy... I hope my journey sheds some light on the human experience and most importantly helps heal the "socio-religious dogma" of a purely binary gender.

Additionally, Beck details his frustration with Veterans Affairs's slow and cautious pace at supporting his transition, especially its requirement that he socially transition at work for a year before receiving hormones.

OutServe Magazine praised the book, calling it "one of the smartest and most important books of the year". The Huffington Post noted that while the "don't ask, don't tell" policy was repealed in 2011, the ban on openly transgender people serving in the U.S. armed forces still remained. Days before the release of Warrior Princess, Metro Weekly's Poliglot column reported that the Pentagon had celebrated LGBT Pride Month in a memo while avoiding mention of transgender military personnel; the Pentagon memo read in part: "We recognize gay, lesbian and bisexual service members and LGBT civilians for their dedicated service to our country." The Atlantic Wire said that the book could "lay the groundwork for even greater inclusion in the armed forces" and Salon stated that Beck's military credentials may "lead the Pentagon to revisit its policy against trans service members". While restrictions on sexual orientation were lifted in 2010–2011, restrictions on gender identity remained in place due to Department of Defense regulations until 2016, when the Obama administration ended the ban on transgender Americans serving in the military.

=== Lady Valor ===
Lady Valor: The Kristin Beck Story, a documentary, aired on CNN on September 4, 2014. Earlier during LGBT Pride Month on June 18, 2014, at the Defense Intelligence Agency, Beck received a plaque from retired Lieutenant General Michael T. Flynn when he led the DIA as its director.

=== Congressional campaign ===
In August 2015, CNN said that Beck was running for Congress to represent Maryland's 5th congressional district. Beck finished second behind Representative Steny Hoyer in the Democratic primary election on April 26, 2016.

=== Media appearances ===
Beck appeared on the Dr. Phil Show in 2015. He has also been interviewed by Anderson Cooper on CNN.

On June 1, 2022, he appeared on an episode of The Joe Rogan Experience podcast. On December 1, 2022, Beck stated in a video interview with Robby Starbuck that he had detransitioned.

== Detransition ==
In December 2022, Beck announced his detransition and said he had "lived in hell for the past 10 years" and that it had been roughly seven years since he last took hormones. Beck has since appeared in the media urging those under 25 not to transition. In an interview he gave with conservative influencer Robby Starbuck, Beck contrasted the beliefs of the LGBTQ community with his own belief in Jesus and God and discussed his desire to convert people away from being transgender by witnessing his own Christian conversion.

Beck said he was offered hormones after an hour-long meeting at a Veterans Affairs medical facility. He said that he had "so much going wrong" in his system when he started taking cross-sex hormones. He also claimed that it is "a billion dollar industry between psychologists, between surgeries, between hormones, between chemicals, between follow-up treatments" and that there are "thousands of gender clinics popping up all over" America and each one is "going to be pulling in probably over $50 million".

Evan Urquhart, writing for Slate, described Beck as having detransitioned due to his newfound moral and ideological beliefs. Urquhart criticized Reuters for profiling Beck's detransition without mentioning that according to Beck's interview with Starbuck, his detransition coincided with embracing conservative Christian views, including that by transitioning he "destroyed everything in my life that was holy, [and that] the temple of God is our bodies".

== Awards and decorations ==
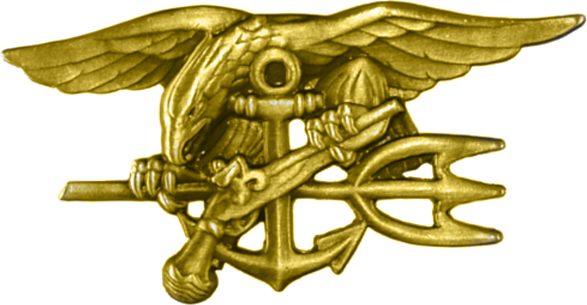

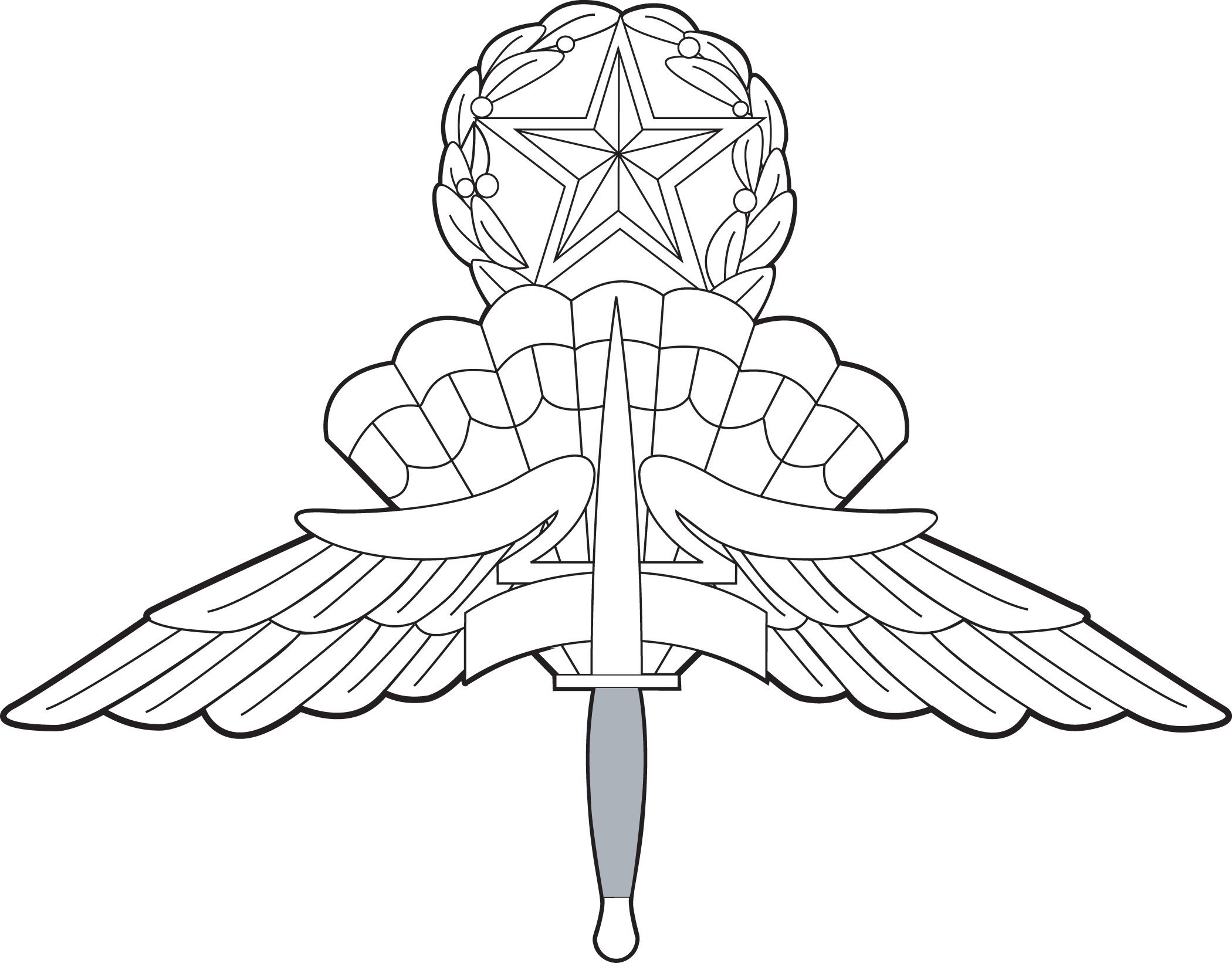

Badge	SEAL Insignia		
1st row	Bronze Star with "V" Device	Purple Heart	Defense Meritorious Service Medal with one oak leaf cluster
2nd row	Joint Service Commendation Medal	Navy and Marine Corps Commendation Medal with "V" device and one 5/16-inch star	Navy and Marine Corps Achievement Medal with three 5/16-inch stars
3rd row	Army Achievement Medal	Air Force Achievement Medal	Navy and Marine Corps Combat Action Ribbon with one 5/16-inch star
4th row	Navy and Marine Corps Presidential Unit Citation with one 3/16-inch star	Joint Meritorious Unit Award with one oak leaf cluster	Navy Unit Commendation with one 3/16-inch star
5th row	Navy Meritorious Unit Commendation	USSOCOM Medal	Navy Good Conduct Medal with four bronze 3/16-inch stars
6th row	National Defense Service Medal with one 3/16-inch star	Armed Forces Expeditionary Medal with two 3/16-inch stars	Southwest Asia Service Medal with one 3/16-inch star
7th row	Afghanistan Campaign Medal with two 3/16-inch stars	Iraq Campaign Medal with one 3/16-inch star	Global War on Terrorism Expeditionary Medal
8th row	Global War on Terrorism Service Medal	Armed Forces Service Medal	Navy Sea Service Deployment Ribbon with twelve 3/16-inch stars
9th row	NATO Medal Yugoslavia	Navy Rifle Marksmanship Medal with expert device	Navy Pistol Marksmanship Medal with expert device
Badge	Naval Parachutist Badge		
Badges	Master Parachutist Badge	Military Freefall Jumpmaster Parachutist Badge	Ranger tab
Badge	United States Special Operations Command Badge		

- Beck has earned five golden service stripes.

== See also ==
- Transgender personnel in the United States military
