= Alvin Thornton =

American university administrator

- Education: Morehouse College (BA); Howard University (PhD)
- Known for: Chair of the Maryland Commission on Education Finance, Equity, and Excellence (The Thornton Commission)
- Awards: NAACP Image Award; Fannie Lou Hamer Service Award
- Scientific career
- Fields: Political science, education policy
- Workplaces: Howard University; Prince George's County Public Schools

Alvin Thornton is an American university administrator. He serves as Associate Provost and directs Howard University's Amgen Scholars Program and is coordinator of its Leadership Alliance Program. He has been a member of the Howard University Political Science faculty for 26 years. He chairs the political science department. Thornton serves as Senior Academic Advisor to the President of Howard University.

== Career ==
Prior to 1980, Thornton worked as a legislative aide to Congressman John Conyers Jr., supporting the congressman's years-long effort to establish a national holiday honoring Martin Luther King Jr. (Martin Luther King Jr. Day was signed into law in 1983). In 1980, he was a Research Fellow with the US Department of Labor, UNCF Summer program.

Thornton served for twenty years as a faculty member in the university's political science department. From July 1995 to January 2002, he served as chair of the department, one of the university's largest. At the conclusion of his chairmanship, he received an award from the department's faculty, students and staff for distinguished service.

Thornton is the author of two books and articles and book chapters dealing with public education and political behavior.

In 1999, at the behest of the governor, he was appointed chairman of the Commission on Education Finance, Equity, and Excellence. Its goal was to find ways for the Maryland system to provide quality education not limited by family income, jurisdiction, or property values.

He served as Associate Dean of the College of Arts and Sciences.

He served for two years as the University's Interim Provost and Chief Academic Officer. He chaired the Self-Study Executive Committee in preparation for the decennial reaffirmation of the university's accreditation by the Middle States Commission on Higher Education (MSCHE). He chaired the university's Presidential Commission on Academic Renewal (PCAR,) which assessed each of the university's academic programs and recommended strategic changes.

He served for eight years as Associate Provost. Thornton had oversight for the university's largest colleges and schools (the College of Arts and Sciences, the School of Business, the School of Communications and the School of Education), the Ralph Bunche International Affairs Center, and the Office of Institutional Assessment and Evaluation. He had oversight responsibility for the Enrollment Management units, and directed the university's Amgen Scholars and Leadership Alliance Programs.

He contributed to the expansion of democratic rights in Prince George's County, Maryland, chairing citizens committees that addressed redistricting (Citizens for Representative Redistricting); and police accountability (Coalition Against Police Brutality).

In 2015, he launched a campaign to seek the Democratic nomination for the 4th U.S. Congressional District seat vacated by Donna Edwards, but withdrew before the primary election.

He was appointed chair of the Prince George's County Public Schools Board of Education in 2018 by County Executive Angela Alsobrooks and served for two years, resigning in December 2020. He had previously served on the county's school board in the 1990s, including three years as its chair.

== Recognition ==
He is the recipient of outstanding leadership and service awards: including the NAACP Image Award (Prince George's County, Md.); Friend of Education Award (Maryland State Teachers’ Association); the Emma Mae Posner Award (Prince George's County Historical Society); and two Fannie Lou Hamer Service Awards (National Conference of Black Political Scientists).
