= David Fraser-Hidalgo =

American politician (born 1969)

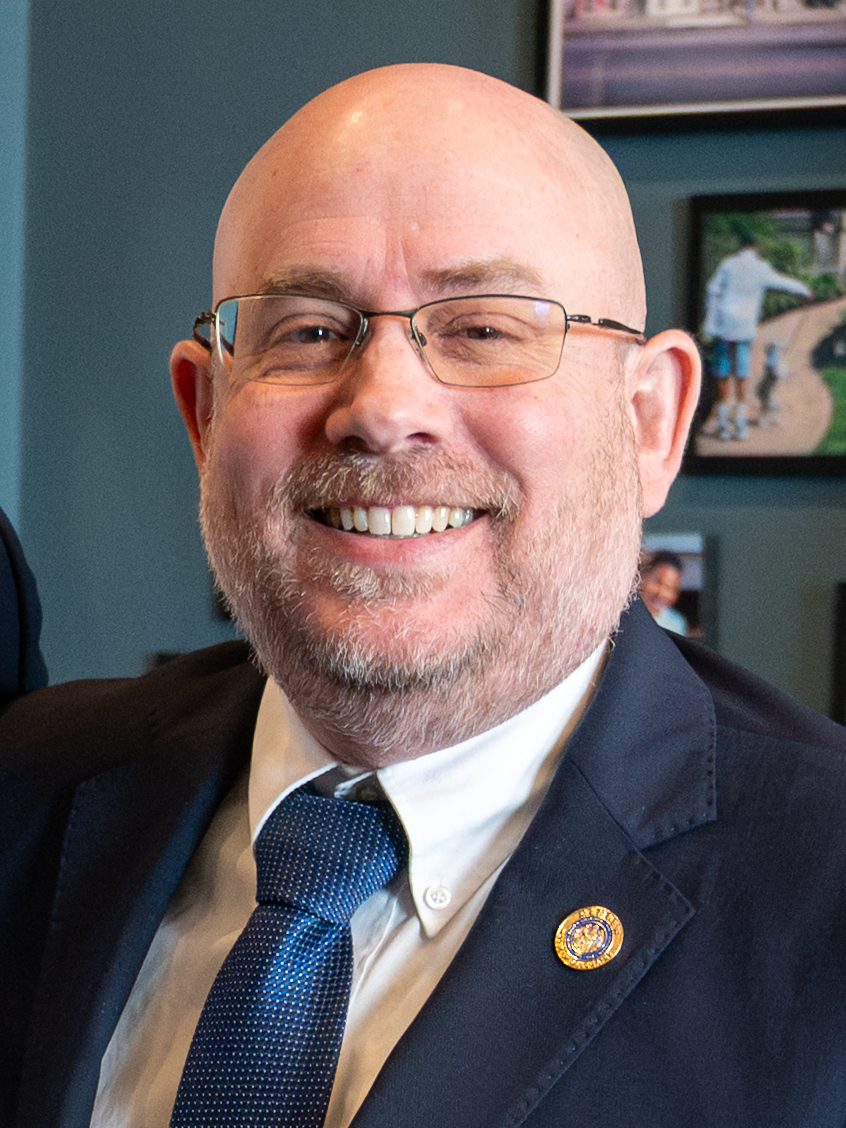
- Fraser-Hidalgo in 2026

Member of the Maryland House of Delegates from the 15th district
- Incumbent
- Assumed office October 21, 2013 Serving with Linda Foley and Lily Qi
- Appointed by: Martin O'Malley
- Preceded by: Brian J. Feldman

Personal details
- Born: 1969 (age 56–57) Quito, Ecuador
- Party: Democratic
- Occupation: Sales Director
- Website: https://www.fraserfor15.org/

David V. Fraser-Hidalgo (born 1969) is an Ecuadorian-born American politician and a member of the Maryland House of Delegates representing District 15 in Montgomery County, Maryland. He was appointed to complete the term of Delegate Brian J. Feldman following Feldman's appointment to a Senate seat and has since been elected to his own full term.

== Early life and education ==
Fraser-Hidalgo was born in 1969 in Quito, Ecuador. He grew up in Montgomery County, Maryland, attending Albert Einstein High School in Kensington, Maryland. In 1992, he earned a B.A. in History from St. Mary's College of Maryland.

For three years, Fraser-Hidalgo served as a police officer in Montgomery County before leaving the police department and entering the business world. He has worked for a number of firms, including being a partner in a Montgomery County based tech firm for 10 years and as an Area Director for Regus. He has also been involved in a variety of volunteer activities in the county, including as a leader in the Boyds Civic Association and sits on the boards of the Montgomery County Hispanic Chamber of Commerce, Community Farm Share and the National Caucus of Environmental Legislators.

In 2010, Fraser-Hidalgo unsuccessfully ran for the Maryland House of Delegates in District 15, coming in fourth place with 8.8 percent of the vote.

== In the legislature ==
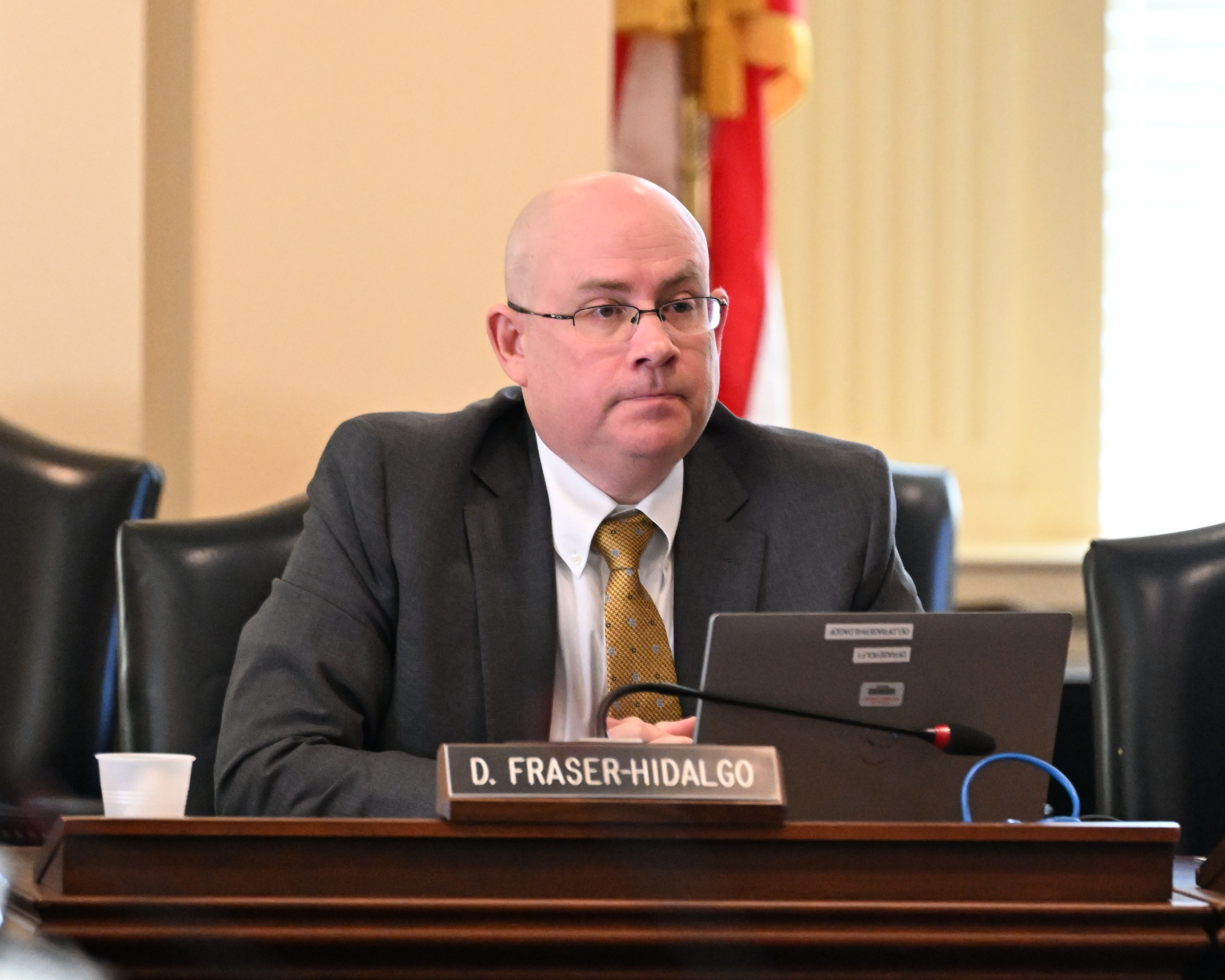
Fraser-Hidalgo in the Economic Matters Committee, 2024

In 2013, the retirement of Senator Robert J. Garagiola from the Maryland Senate prompted the appointment of Delegate Brian J. Feldman to fill the remainder of Garagiola's term. This left an open Delegate seat, which was contested by a number of applicants. Fraser-Hidalgo won the final vote of the Montgomery County Democratic Central Committee by a close margin, and on October 16, 2013, was appointed by Governor Martin O'Malley to fill the seat. He was sworn in on October 21, 2013.

In February 2015, Fraser-Hidalgo joined state Senator Victor Ramirez and Delegates Joseline Peña-Melnyk, Maricé Morales, Will Campos, and Ana Sol Gutierrez in organizing the Maryland Latino Legislative Caucus, becoming one of the caucus' first six members. Fraser-Hidalgo served as the Latino Caucus' chair from 2019 to 2024.

== Political positions ==
=== Environment ===
Fraser-Hidalgo repeatedly introduced legislation that would ban the practice of fracking in Maryland. During the 2017 legislative session, his bill passed and was signed into law by Governor Larry Hogan on April 4, 2017.

During the 2019 legislative session, Fraser-Hidalgo introduced a bill that would increase the state's electric vehicle tax credit to $3,000. The bill passed and was signed into law by Governor Hogan on April 30, 2019. During the 2022 legislative session, Fraser-Hidalgo introduced a bill extending the tax credit, which passed and was signed into law.

During the 2021 legislative session, Fraser-Hidalgo introduced a bill that would charge polluters a carbon fee for their greenhouse gas emissions, which would fund education programs and green infrastructure. The bill received an unfavorable committee report.

During the 2022 legislative session, Fraser-Hidalgo introduced a bill that would set goals for electrifying the state's vehicle fleet, with 100 percent of passenger cars purchased to be electric by 2028 and all passenger cars in the fleet to be electric by 2031.

=== Industrial hemp ===
During the 2018 legislative session, Fraser-Hidalgo introduced a bill that would create a pilot program authorizing both growing and processing operations for industrial hemp. The bill passed with nearly unanimous support (136–1 in the House and 46–0 in the Senate) and was signed into law by Governor Hogan. During the 2019 legislative session, he introduced legislation to fully legalize commercial hemp farming, which was signed into law by Governor Hogan.

=== Social issues ===
During the 2016 legislative session, Fraser-Hidalgo introduced a bill that would have strengthened laws on underage drinking. The bill was watered down during committee hearings, but passed and became law.

During the 2020 legislative session, Fraser-Hidalgo introduced a bill that would require special elections to fill vacancies in the Maryland General Assembly.

In February 2026, Fraser-Hidalgo supported a bill that would prohibit investor-owned utilities from paying employee bonuses and supervisor compensation with ratepayer dollars.

== Personal life ==
Fraser-Hidalgo lives in Boyds, Maryland, in a home that is almost completely autonomous. He was married to Lisa Bethel, and has two children, Samantha and Scott. In the early spring of 2018, his wife Lisa died from cancer.

== Electoral history ==
Maryland House of Delegates District 15 Democratic Primary Election, 2010
Party	Candidate	Votes	%
Democratic	Brian J. Feldman	6,262	31.4%
Democratic	Kathleen Dumais	6,086	30.6%
Democratic	Aruna Miller	4,671	23.5%
Democratic	David-Fraser Hidalgo	1,755	8.8%
Democratic	Lara Wibeto	1,142	5.7%

Maryland House of Delegates District 15 Democratic Primary Election, 2014
Party	Candidate	Votes	%
Democratic	Kathleen Dumais	6,156	30.6%
Democratic	Aruna Miller	5,748	28.6%
Democratic	David Fraser-Hidalgo	4,447	22.1%
Democratic	Bennett Rushkoff	3,754	18.7%

Maryland House of Delegates District 15 General Election, 2014
Party	Candidate	Votes	%
Democratic	Kathleen Dumais	19,083	20.6%
Democratic	Aruna Miller	18,071	19.5%
Democratic	David Fraser-Hidalgo	17,324	18.7%
Republican	Ed Edmundson	12,913	13.9%
Republican	Christine Thron	12,825	13.8%
Republican	Flynn Ficker	12,355	13.3%
N/A	Other Write-Ins	86	0.1%

Maryland House of Delegates District 15 Democratic Primary Election, 2018
Party	Candidate	Votes	%
Democratic	Kathleen Dumais	8,207	22.4%
Democratic	Lily Qi	6,568	17.9%
Democratic	David Fraser-Hidalgo	6,206	16.9%
Democratic	Amy Frieder	5,289	14.4%
Democratic	Kevin Mack	4,257	11.6%
Democratic	Anis Ahmed	2,097	5.7%
Democratic	Andy Van Wye	2,032	5.5%
Democratic	Hamza Sarwar Khan	1,262	3.4%
Democratic	Tony Puca	776	2.1%

Maryland House of Delegates District 15 General Election, 2018
Party	Candidate	Votes	%
Democratic	Kathleen Dumais	36,331	24.6%
Democratic	Lily Qi	34,888	23.6%
Democratic	David Fraser-Hidalgo	33,808	22.9%
Republican	Laurie Halverson	15,678	10.6%
Republican	Harvey Jacobs	14,096	9.5%
Republican	Marc A. King	12,993	8.8%
N/A	Other Write-Ins	139	0.1%

Maryland House of Delegates District 15 General Election, 2022
Party	Candidate	Votes	%
Democratic	Lily Qi	21,127	23.1%
Democratic	Linda Foley	21,097	23.1%
Democratic	David Fraser-Hidalgo	20,429	22.4%
Republican	Stacey Sauter	9,930	10.9%
Republican	Matt Wade	9,426	10.3%
Republican	Jodi Noah	9,321	9.1%
N/A	Other Write-Ins	73	0.1%
