= Anne Speckhard =

Counter-terrorism researcher

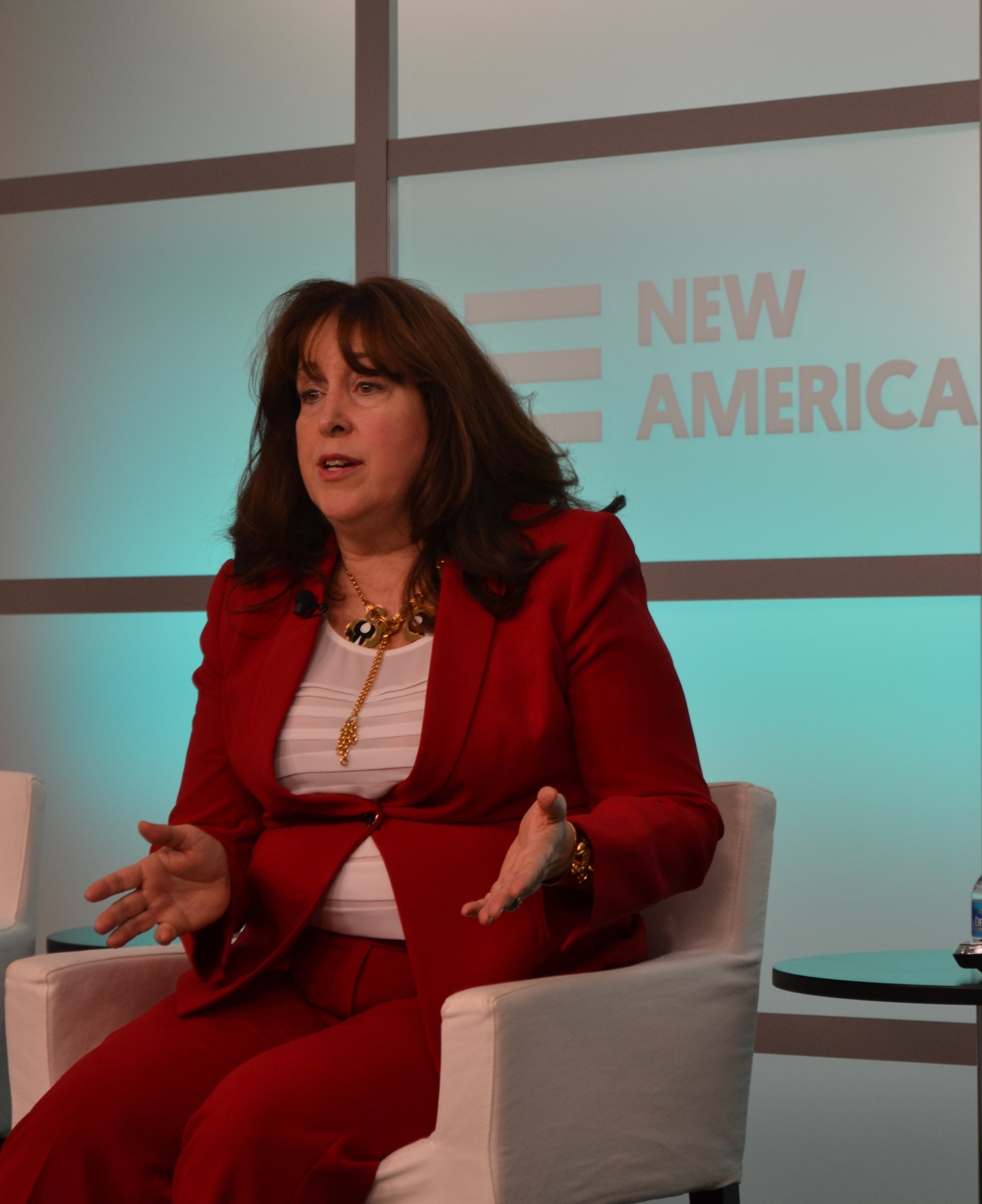
Anne Speckhard

Anne Speckhard is an adjunct associate professor of psychiatry at Georgetown University School of Medicine in Washington D.C. Her research focuses on developing counter-terrorism initiatives and understanding the motivations of terrorists. She is the director of the International Center for the Study of Violent Extremism (ICSVE).

== Research ==
Speckhard's research focuses on understanding the psychology behind terrorism. She has consulted almost 500 terrorists as well as their family and friends. She created the psychological challenge from the Detainee Rehabilitation Program located in Iraq as well as running the Breaking the ISIS Brand Counternarratives Project. It has been devoted to more than 20,000 detainees and 800 juveniles. Additionally, she has focused on the role of women in terrorist organizations.

== Bibliography ==
- Talking to Terrorists (2012)
- Fetal Abduction (2012)
- Warrior Princess (2013)
- Timothy Tottle's Terrific Dream (2014)
- Undercover Jihadi (2014)
- Timothy Tottle's Terrific Crocodiles (2015)
- Bride of Isis (2015)
