= Steve Whisler =

American politician (born 1968)

Member-elect of the Maryland House of Delegates from the 5th district
- Assuming office January 13, 2027
- Succeeding: Christopher Eric Bouchat

Personal details
- Born: 1968 (age 57–58) Pennsylvania, U.S.
- Party: Republican
- Children: 4
- Education: Community College of Baltimore County (AA); Excelsior University (BA); Troy University (MS)

Military service
- Branch: United States Navy
- Service years: 1986–2006
- Rank: Lieutenant
- Battles/wars: Operation Desert Storm
- Awards: Combat Action Ribbon; Air Medal

Steve Whisler (born 1968) is an American politician and retired U.S. Navy officer who is a member-elect of the Maryland House of Delegates from 5th district. A member of the Republican Party, he was a member of the Carroll County Board of Education from 2022 to 2026.

== Early life and education ==
Whisler was born in Pennsylvania in 1968, and raised in Fort Lauderdale, Florida area. His father served as an U.S. Army police officer. After graduating from high school, Whisler enlisted in the U.S. Navy, becoming a cryptologic technician interpreter specializing in Farsi. He was stationed aboard Navy ships in the Persian Gulf during Operation Desert Storm, where he monitored transmissions and activities of potential adversaries and gathered intelligence aboard surveillance aircraft. During his service, he logged 700 flight hours and was awarded the Combat Action Ribbon and the Air Medal. Whisler retired as a lieutenant in 2006.

Whisler graduated from Catonsville Community College in 1994, earning an associate's degree in liberal arts in 1994. He then attended Excelsior University, where he earned a Bachelor of Arts degree in sociology, and Troy University, where he earned a Master of Science degree in management. Whisler also completed coursework at Johns Hopkins University and the University of Phoenix.

== Career ==
Whisler moved to Maryland in 1988, to work at the National Security Administration off and on until he retired in 2006. After retiring, he worked for several defense contractors.

Whisler previously served as the president of the Westview Park Improvement and Civic Association in Catonsville, Maryland. He also taught at Baltimore County Public Schools for eight years and served as a board member of Tower Federal Credit Union.

In 2008, Whisler ran to be an alternate delegate to the 2008 Republican National Convention, pledged to U.S. senator Fred Thompson. In 2010, Whisler ran for the Baltimore County Council in District 1, winning the Republican primary unopposed and losing to Democratic nominee Tom Quirk in the general election. Following his defeat, he became a senior defense contractor for Northrop Grumman.

=== Carroll County Board of Education ===
Whisler was elected to the Carroll County Board of Education in 2022. During his campaign, he signed Moms for Liberty's "Parent Pledge" and supported efforts to ban the display of pride flags in school buildings. Whisler was sworn in on December 7, 2022. In December 2025, he was elected to serve as the school board's president.

During his tenure, Whisler criticized critical race theory, supported efforts to ban cellphones from schools, and expressed concerns with funding mandates under the Blueprint for Maryland's Future. He also supported efforts to ban books involving race, gender, or sexuality from school libraries; in January 2024, Whisler proposed a policy change that would ban all library books and instructional material containing "sexually explicit" content from public schools, which was unanimously approved by the school board. Later that year, he accused Alison Rudolph, a Carroll County bookstore owner, of "sexualizing kids" by promoting an annual Banned Books Week on her store's Facebook page. Rudolph later said that Whisler's comments set off a wave of negative reviews and damaged her business, and petitioned the Maryland State Board of Education to remove Whisler from office for his comments. Whisler responded to the petition by stating his comments were not made in any official capacity and by citing the First Amendment to the United States Constitution. In February 2025, the state board criticized Whisler's posts as unsuitable due to his position, but dismissed the removal request, saying that the posts did not impact the local school board's operations.

In December 2025, Whisler was accused of plagiarizing a resolution honoring the United States Semiquincentennial from the 1776 Project, a conservative nonprofit focused on promoting conservative principles and parental rights and countering curricula promoted by The 1619 Project. Whisler denied the allegations, which he called "crazy and untrue", saying that he never claimed to have authored the resolution. During the meeting in which Whisler introduced the resolution, he claimed that it was put out by BestinEd, School Boards for Academic Excellence, the 1776 Project PAC, and the White House, but later wrote in an email to Carroll County Times that he got the resolution from another school board member in Sarasota County, Florida.

=== Maryland House of Delegates ===
In March 2025, Whisler announced that he would run for the 5th district of the Maryland House of Delegates, seeking to succeed Christopher Eric Bouchat, who did not seek re-election. During his campaign, he supported cuts to the Blueprint for Maryland's Future, opposed efforts by the Maryland General Assembly to dictate school curriculums, and criticized the Maryland Piedmont Reliability Project. Whisler won the Republican primary on June 23, 2026, alongside incumbents Chris Tomlinson and April Rose, and defeated Democratic nominees Dayana Bergman, Alison Rudolph, and Courtney Welch in the general election.

Whisler will be sworn in on January 13, 2027. He will be a member of the Environment and Transportation Committee.

== Personal life ==
Whisler is married and has four sons. He moved from Catonsville, Maryland, to Carroll County in 2014. As of 2022, Whisler lives in Marriottsville, Maryland.

== Electoral history ==
2010 Baltimore County Council District 1 election
Primary election
Party	Candidate	Votes	%
Republican	Steve Whisler	3,824	100.0%
Total votes		3,824	100.00%
General election
Democratic	Tom Quirk	19,551	55.5%
Republican	Steve Whisler	15,574	44.2%
Write-in		72	0.2%
Total votes		35,197	100.00%

2022 Carroll County Board of Education election
Primary election
Candidate	Votes	%
Patricia Ann Dorsey (incumbent)	17,220	18.30%
Tom Scanlan	15,318	16.28%
Amanda Jozkowski	15,024	15.97%
Steve Whisler	14,809	15.74%
Tara Battaglia (incumbent)	14,402	15.31%
James Miller	12,269	13.04%
Katie Speert	3,230	3.43%
Pat Sands	1,820	1.93%
Total votes	94,092	100.00%
General election
Tara Battaglia (incumbent)	34,069	18.94%
Steve Whisler	32,198	17.90%
Patricia Ann Dorsey (incumbent)	30,307	16.84%
James Miller	28,954	16.09%
Amanda Jozkowski	28,216	15.68%
Tom Scanlan	25,750	14.31%
Write-in	431	0.24%
Total votes	179,925	100.00%
