= Joshua Stonko =

American politician

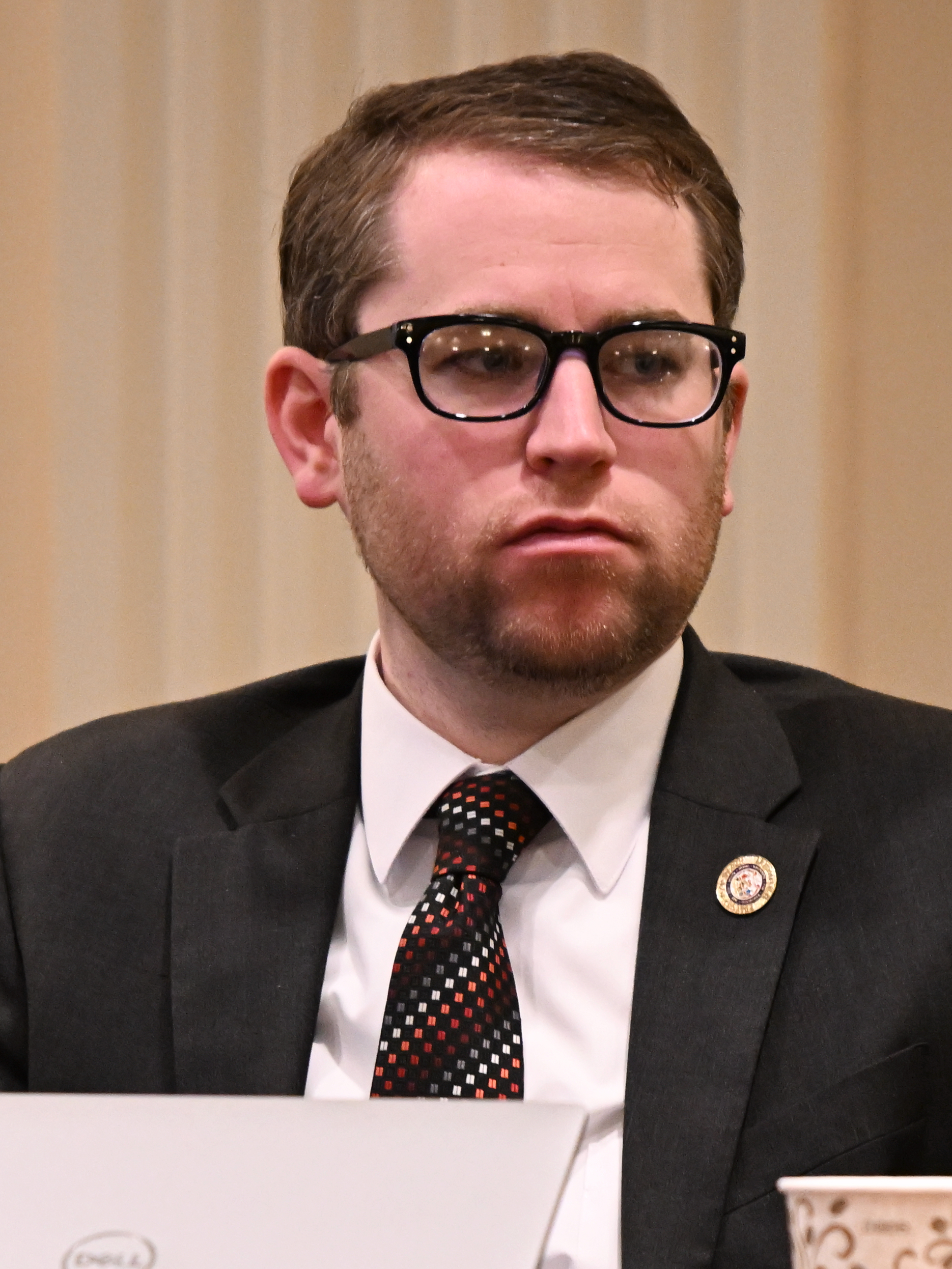
- Stonko in 2023

Member of the Maryland House of Delegates from the 42C district
- Incumbent
- Assumed office January 11, 2023
- Preceded by: Redistricting
- Constituency: Carroll County, Maryland

Personal details
- Born: 1992 or 1993 (age 33–34)
- Party: Republican
- Education: University of Maryland, College Park (BA); University of Maryland Global Campus (BS)

Joshua James Stonko (born 1992/1993) is an American politician who is currently a member of the Maryland House of Delegates for District 42C in Carroll County, Maryland. He was previously a candidate for District 5 of the Maryland House of Delegates in 2014 and 2015.

== Background ==
Stonko graduated from Manchester Valley High School in 2011, afterwards attending the University of Maryland, College Park, where he earned a Bachelor of Arts degree in economics in 2014. After graduating, he worked for PNC Bank from 2015 to 2022, and for JPMorgan Chase since 2022.

== In the legislature ==
Stonko was sworn into the Maryland House of Delegates on January 11, 2023. He was a member of the Appropriations Committee.

Stonko did not run for re-election and will be succeeded by Steve Patten.

== Electoral history ==
Maryland House of Delegates District 5 Republican primary election, 2014
Party	Candidate	Votes	%
Republican	Justin Ready	10,567	25.0
Republican	Susan Krebs	7,665	18.1
Republican	Haven Shoemaker	7,308	17.3
Republican	Joshua Stonko	5,813	13.8
Republican	Donald B. Elliott	4,064	9.6
Republican	Kevin R. Utz	4,024	9.5
Republican	Carmen Amedori	2,819	6.7

Maryland House of Delegates District 42C Republican primary election, 2022
Party	Candidate	Votes	%
Republican	Joshua Stonko	3,612	68.4
Republican	Lyn Mallick	1,667	31.6

Maryland House of Delegates District 42C election, 2022
Party	Candidate	Votes	%
Republican	Joshua Stonko	14,242	97.61
Write-in		349	2.39
