= Haven Shoemaker =

American politician (born 1965)

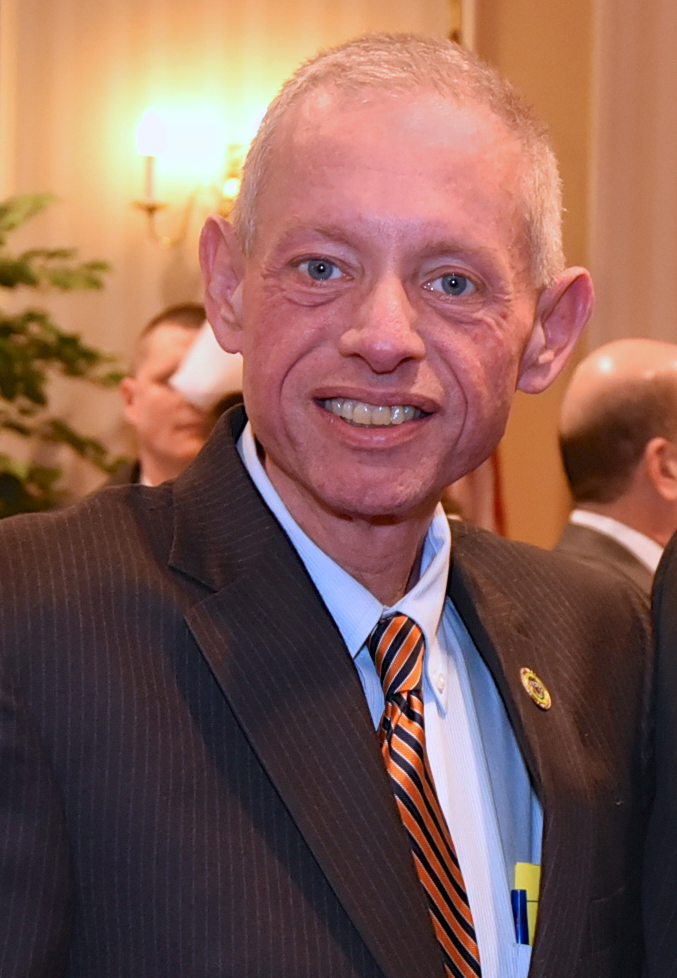
- Shoemaker in 2016

State's Attorney of Carroll County
- Incumbent
- Assumed office January 3, 2023
- Preceded by: Allan J. Culver (acting)

Member of the Maryland House of Delegates from the 5th district
- In office January 14, 2015 – January 3, 2023 Serving with Susan W. Krebs, Justin Ready, April Rose
- Preceded by: Redistricting
- Succeeded by: Chris Tomlinson

Member of the Carroll County Board of County Commissioners from the 2nd district
- In office December 6, 2010 – December 2, 2014
- Preceded by: Julia Walsh Gouge
- Succeeded by: C. Richard Weaver

Mayor of Hampstead, Maryland
- In office May 15, 2003 – December 6, 2010
- Preceded by: Christopher M. Nevin
- Succeeded by: Christopher M. Nevin

Member of the Hampstead Town Council
- In office May 13, 1997 – May 15, 2003

Personal details
- Born: Haven N. Shoemaker, Jr. January 26, 1965 (age 61) Baltimore, Maryland, U.S.
- Party: Republican
- Spouse: Patty
- Children: 1
- Parents: Haven N. Shoemaker Sr. (father); Carolyn Shoemaker (mother)
- Education: North East High School
- Alma mater: University of Maryland, Baltimore County, B.A. (political science), 1987. Widener University School of Law, J.D., magna cum laude, 1992.
- Profession: Attorney

Military service
- Branch/service: Army National Guard
- Years of service: 1987–1989

Haven N. Shoemaker, Jr. (born January 26, 1965) is an American politician who is currently the State's Attorney for Carroll County, Maryland. He previously served as a Republican member of the Maryland House of Delegates from 2015 to 2022, and as the House minority whip in 2022. He also previously served as a Carroll County Commissioner, as Mayor of Hampstead, Maryland, and as a member of the Hampstead Town Council.

== Early life and career ==
Shoemaker was born in Baltimore, Maryland. After graduating from North East High School in North East, Maryland, he attended the University of Maryland, Baltimore County, where he earned a B.A. degree in political science in 1987, and Widener University School of Law, where he earned a J.D. degree magna cum laude in 1992. In between universities, he served in the Army National Guard for two years.

Shoemaker was admitted to the Maryland Bar in 1992 and has operated his own law office since 1994, when he moved in Hampstead.

In 1995, Shoemaker unsuccessfully ran for the Hampstead Town Council. In 1996, he ran to fill a vacancy in the town council left by the resignation of Dwight W. Homer, but lost to Seth Shipley. He ran again in 1997, winning the election with 227 votes. He served on the town council until he was elected the town's mayor in 2003. He ran on a ticket alongside outgoing mayor Christoper Nevin. In November 2005, Shoemaker announced his candidacy for the Maryland House of Delegates in District 5A. He received 14.7 percent of the vote in the Republican primary election. He ran unopposed in 2007.

== Carroll County Commissioner ==
In 2010, Shoemaker was elected to the Carroll County Board of County Commissioners, representing District 2. He was sworn in on December 6, 2010.

While on the Carroll County board of commissioners, Shoemaker introduced an "English only" ordinance which was passed unanimously in 2013. He opposed an unsuccessful 2020 proposal to repeal the ordinance which he has called his idea.

In June 2013, Shoemaker voted to block Carroll County residents and businesses from paying Maryland's stormwater fee, calling the tax "idiotic".

Shoemaker announced his candidacy for the Maryland House of Delegates on June 24, 2013. He won the primary election with 17.3 percent of the vote and defeated Democratic candidates Dorothy G. Scanian and Zachary Hands in the general election with 27.2 percent of the vote.

== In the legislature ==
Shoemaker was sworn into the Maryland House of Delegates on January 14, 2015. He served as the House Minority Whip in 2022.

In 2016, Shoemaker ran for alternative RNC delegate from Maryland's 1st congressional district in the Republican primary, pledged to Marco Rubio. He voted for Donald Trump in the general election, albeit "not happily".

Shoemaker was re-elected in 2018, during which he ran on a "Team Hogan" platform alongside state Senator Justin Ready and Delegates Susan Krebs and April Rose.

=== Committee assignments ===
- Member, Judiciary Committee, 2021–2022
- Joint Committee on Administrative, Executive and Legislative Review, 2019–2022
- Rules and Executive Nominations Committee, 2022
- Legislative Policy Committee, 2022
- Member, Ways and Means Committee, 2015–2021 (finance resources subcommittee, 2015–2017; education subcommittee, 2015–2020; election law subcommittee, 2017–2021; early childhood subcommittee, 2021)

=== Other memberships ===
- Minority Parliamentarian, 2017–2021
- Chief Deputy Minority Whip, 2021
- House Chair, Carroll County Delegation, 2017–2022
- Member, Maryland Legislative Sportsmen's Caucus, 2015–2022
- Maryland Veterans Caucus, 2015–2022

== Carroll County State's Attorney ==
In July 2021, Shoemaker announced his candidacy for Carroll County State's Attorney, opting out of a third term in the legislature. He won the Republican primary on July 19, 2022, receiving 57.3 percent of the vote.

During his tenure, Shoemaker lobbied for salary increases for state's attorney's office staff and for funding to construct a new building for the State's Attorney's Office. On June 2, 2025, he announced that he would not run for re-election for a second term in 2026. Shoemaker endorsed his special counsel, Allan Culver, to succeed him as state's attorney, but Culver was defeated by private defense attorney George Psoras in the Republican primary by 176 votes. After Shoemaker leaves office in January 2027, he says he plans to move to North Carolina, criticizing Maryland as a "sanctuary state" and a "lost cause" during an interview with Fox 45.

== Political positions ==
=== Abortion ===
In May 2019, Shoemaker accused Maryland Comptroller Peter Franchot of "playing partisan politics" in asking officials to review whether the state's pension system had investments in Alabama after the state passed laws restricting access to abortions.

In March 2022, Shoemaker voted against legislation that would create a ballot referendum to enshrine access to reproductive care into the Constitution of Maryland.

In April 2022, Shoemaker voted against legislation that would expand abortion access by expanding who can perform abortions and providing financial support to train health care professionals to offer reproductive services, calling it the "most radical expansion of abortion in Maryland's history in a state that already has some of the most liberal abortion laws in the country."

=== Business ===
In December 2020, the Maryland Free Enterprise Association gave Shoemaker a score of 100 percent in its annual legislative scorecard.

=== COVID-19 pandemic ===
In June 2020, Shoemaker attended the Carroll County Freedom Rally to protest the state's coronavirus restrictions. Later in the month, Shoemaker authored a Baltimore Sun op-ed "Gov. Hogan deserves an 'F' for his handling the pandemic, roepening", that argued Governor Hogan wasn't doing enough to reopen businesses in Maryland amid the COVID-19 pandemic. In November 2020, he authored another op-ed, "With Republicans like Gov. Hogan, who needs Democrats?", that accused Governor Larry Hogan of setting up a "snitch hotline" that allows Marylanders to call in crowd-size violations to law enforcement authorities.

In September 2021, Shoemaker voted against regulations that would implement an universal mask mandate in public schools. In February 2022, he called on Governor Hogan to repeal the state's school masking policy.

=== Education ===
Shoemaker introduced legislation in the 2016 legislative session that would limit standardized testing for kindergarten students and prevent any future testing of prekindergarten students. The bill passed and became law on April 26, 2016.

In February 2020, Shoemaker voted against legislation that would reverse a Labor Day start date for all public schools in Maryland. In March 2020, Shoemaker voted against the Blueprint for Maryland's Future reform bill.

=== Elections ===
Shoemaker introduced legislation in the 2022 legislative session that would require election officials to verify signatures on all mail-in ballots, and another bill that would prohibit sending mail-in ballots to voters unless the voters requested them. Both bills did not receive a vote on the House floor.

=== Environment ===
Shoemaker opposed the Climate Solutions Now Act of 2021.

=== Guns ===
Shoemaker opposed legislation introduced in the 2022 legislative session that would require firearm dealers to install video surveillance and alarm systems at their gun shops, saying that he considered the security requirements "onerous".

=== Immigration ===
In July 2017, Shoemaker joined 35 of his House and Senate colleagues penned a letter questioning the legal merits of a lawsuit launched by Maryland Attorney General Brian Frosh over Executive Order 13769.

=== Policing and sentencing ===
In July 2020, Shoemaker hosted a rally outside of the Maryland State House to support law enforcement officials following the murder of George Floyd.

In March 2021, Shoemaker voted against the Maryland Police Accountability Act of 2021, arguing that it would cause a mass exodus of police officers from forces across the state. He also voted against legislation that would end life without parole sentences for juvenile offenders.

=== Social issues ===
In November 2020, Shoemaker called an anti-Donald Trump banner displayed at the house of a Carroll County Public Schools administrator "hate speech".

In April 2021, Shoemaker voted against legislation that would require schools to allow students to engage in peaceful demonstrations.

Shoemaker introduced legislation in the 2022 legislative session that would prohibit registered sex offenders from operating babysitting services.

In February 2022, Shoemaker voted against legislation that would create a ballot referendum to legalize recreational marijuana, saying it would be wrong to legalize marijuana before the state can conduct its study of its public health effects.

== Electoral history ==
Hampstead, Maryland mayoral election, 2003
Candidate	Votes	%
Haven Shoemaker	373	69.5
Wayne Thomas	164	30.5

Maryland House of Delegates District 5A Republican primary election, 2006
Party	Candidate	Votes	%
Republican	Nancy R. Stocksdale	4,455	30.2
Republican	Tanya Thornton Shewell	3,519	23.8
Republican	Haven N. Shoemaker, Jr.	2,172	14.7
Republican	Kevin R. Utz	1,847	12.5
Republican	C. Scott Stone	1,568	10.6
Republican	William C. Niner	903	6.1
Republican	David D. Wallace, II	308	2.1

Carroll County Commissioner District 2 Republican primary election, 2010
Party	Candidate	Votes	%
Republican	Haven Shoemaker	1,592	39.0
Republican	Brian K. Dimaggio	913	22.4
Republican	Stephen Buettner	810	19.9
Republican	Julia Walsh Gouge	763	18.7

Carroll County Commissioner District 2 election, 2010
Party	Candidate	Votes	%
Republican	Haven Shoemaker	8,661	68.3
Democratic	Charles E. Bevard	3,991	31.5
Write-in		37	0.3

Maryland House of Delegates District 5 Republican primary election, 2014
Party	Candidate	Votes	%
Republican	Justin Ready	10,567	25.0
Republican	Susan W. Krebs	7,665	18.1
Republican	Haven Shoemaker	7,308	17.3
Republican	Joshua Stonko	5,813	13.8
Republican	Donald B. Elliott	4,064	9.6
Republican	Kevin R. Utz	4,024	9.5
Republican	Carmen M. Amedori	2,819	6.7

Maryland House of Delegates District 5 election, 2014
Party	Candidate	Votes	%
Republican	Susan Krebs	35,701	28.6
Republican	Justin Ready	34,789	27.9
Republican	Haven Shoemaker	33,985	27.2
Democratic	Dorothy G. Scanlan	11,737	9.4
Democratic	Zachary Hands	8,210	6.6
Write-in		351	0.3

Alternate Delegates to the Republican National Convention, District 1, 2016
Party	Candidate	Votes	%
Republican	Dona Goeller (Trump)	56,423	20.9
Republican	Claude T. Lewis (Trump)	55,164	20.5
Republican	Denise Kuchta Lovelady (Trump)	55,070	20.4
Republican	David Scott Lazarus (Cruz)	16,339	6.1
Republican	Christina Trotta (Cruz)	16,018	5.9
Republican	Emma Middleton (Cruz)	15,728	5.8
Republican	Arlette Kelly Bright (Carson)	7,135	2.6
Republican	Laurie Mullinx Luellen (Carson)	6,016	2.2
Republican	Haven Shoemaker (Rubio)	4,821	1.8
Republican	Stephen S. Hershey Jr. (Christie)	4,550	1.7
Republican	Michael W. Dawson (Rubio)	4,347	1.6
Republican	Ummu Bradley Thomas (Carson)	4,312	1.6
Republican	J. B. Jennings	3,908	1.4
Republican	Kevin Bailey Hornberger (Rubio)	3,833	1.4
Republican	James Reilly	3,711	1.4
Republican	Chad R. Shrodes	3,166	1.2
Republican	Mark Novak	2,986	1.1
Republican	Christopher Brian Gannon	2,262	0.8
Republican	David L. Catrino	2,114	0.8
Republican	Angela Sudano-Marcellino	1,748	0.6

Maryland House of Delegates District 5 Republican primary election, 2018
Party	Candidate	Votes	%
Republican	Susan Krebs	9,566	31.0
Republican	Haven Shoemaker	8,811	28.5
Republican	April Rose	8,350	27.0
Republican	David Ellin	4,176	13.5

Maryland House of Delegates District 5 election, 2018
Party	Candidate	Votes	%
Republican	Susan Krebs	39,236	30.9
Republican	April Rose	33,991	26.8
Republican	Haven Shoemaker	33,658	26.5
Democratic	Emily Shank	19,484	15.4
Write-in		516	0.4

Carroll County State's Attorney Republican primary election, 2022
Party	Candidate	Votes	%
Republican	Haven Shoemaker	11,530	57.3
Republican	David Ellin	8,596	42.7

Carroll County State's Attorney election, 2022
Party	Candidate	Votes	%
Republican	Haven Shoemaker	51,197	96.1
Write-in		2,097	3.9
