= April Rose (politician) =

American politician

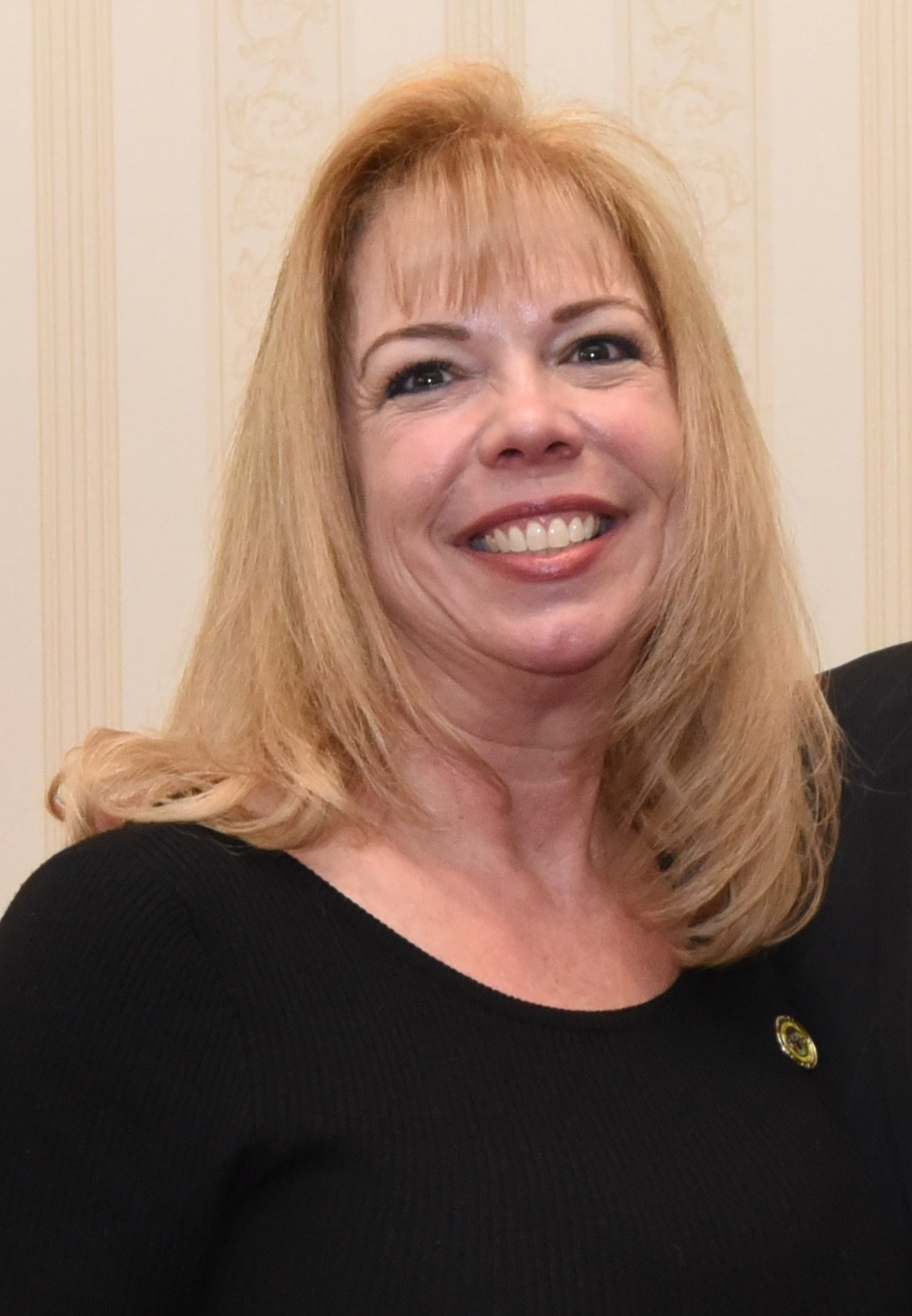
- Rose in 2018

Member of the Maryland House of Delegates from the 5th district
- Incumbent
- Assumed office March 16, 2015 Serving with Christopher Eric Bouchat, Chris Tomlinson
- Appointed by: Larry Hogan
- Preceded by: Justin Ready

Personal details
- Born: 1968 or 1969 (age 57–58) Salisbury, Maryland, U.S.
- Party: Republican
- Spouse: Michael Richards
- Children: 6

April R. Rose (born 1968 or 1969) is an American politician who is a member of the Republican Party who represents the fifth district in the Maryland House of Delegates. She has also served as the Assistant Minority Leader since 2021.

== Background ==
Rose was born in Salisbury, Maryland, in 1968 or 1969. She graduated from Arlington Baptist High School and attended Villa Julie College from 1986 to 1987.

Rose worked as an underwriter for Countrywide Home Loans from 2001 to 2005, afterwards working as a licensed real estate salesperson for Main Street America Reality until 2008. She has worked as an IT recruiter for NMR Consulting since 2009.

Rose first got involved in politics in 2002 as a member of the South Carroll Republican Club, eventually becoming its president. She was also a member of the Carroll County Republican Central Committee from 2004 to 2010. In 2008, Rose started working as an events coordinator for the Maryland Republican Party before resigning after party chair James Pelura fired the party's executive director Justin Ready in July 2009, which sparked infighting between Pelura and members of the Maryland General Assembly that eventually ended in Pelura's ouster. In 2010, she became a communications coordinator for the Maryland Republican Caucus.

In 2014, Governor Martin O'Malley appointed Rose to the Carroll County Board of Elections.

== In the legislature ==
Rose was appointed by Governor Larry Hogan to fill a vacancy left by state delegate Justin Ready, who was appointed to fill a vacancy in the Maryland Senate left by state senator Joseph M. Getty. She was sworn in on March 16, 2015, and was elected to a full four-year term in 2018. Rose was a member of the Health and Governments Operations Committee from 2015 to 2017, and served in the Ways and Means Committee from 2017 to 2022, afterwards serving in the Economic Matters Committee. Since 2021, she has served as the Assistant House Minority Leader.

During the 2016 Republican Party presidential primaries, Rose said she initially supported Texas governor Rick Perry but supported Donald Trump once he became the Republican nominee, agreeing with his positions on fiscal issues and citing her distrust for Hillary Clinton.

== Political positions ==
=== Abortion ===
Rose self-identifies as "pro-life" and opposes euthanasia. During the 2016 legislative session, she supported legislation to ban abortions past 20 weeks of pregnancy. In 2019, Rose introduced an amendment to the state budget that sought to remove Medicaid funding for abortions, which was rejected in a 41–93 vote. In March 2022, during debate on the Abortion Care Access Act, she introduced an amendment to reappropriate the bill's $3.5 million in funding for clinical training, which was rejected in a 41–85 vote. In May 2023, after Governor Wes Moore signed a bill creating a 2024 referendum on codifying abortion access into law, Rose released a statement calling the bill "radical".

=== Crime and policing ===
During the 2018 legislative session, Rose supported legislation that would sentence people convicted of mass murder or killing a police officer to death. In July 2020, amid nationwide George Floyd protests, Rose organized a "Back the Blue" rally in Annapolis. During the 2021 legislative session, Rose said she opposed the Police Reform and Accountability Act, an omnibus police reform bill that repealed the Law Enforcement Officers' Bill of Rights and regulated the types of use of force police could use in arrests.

=== Education ===
During the 2016 legislative session, Rose supported legislation to limit standardized testing in kindergarten and ban testing in prekindergarten.

During the 2019 legislative session, Rose introduced legislation that would allow computer science classes to qualify toward foreign language credits required for high school graduation. In 2021, she introduced a bill that would count computer science classes toward math credits.

In March 2020, Rose said she supported some of the policy items in the Blueprint for Maryland's Future, including its college and career readiness initiatives, but said that it would be "fiscally irresponsible" to move forward with it during the COVID-19 pandemic. She also opposed tax increases to pay for the Blueprint reforms.

In May 2020, amid the COVID-19 pandemic, Rose signed onto a letter asking the county health department to allow Carroll County Public Schools to have outdoor graduations. The county health department rejected the request, citing Governor Larry Hogan's executive orders. In June, she participated in and spoke at a Reopen Maryland rally to call for the lifting of COVID-19 restrictions. Rose has signed onto letters asking the Maryland State Department of Education to lift the county's in-school mask mandate, calling it "unscientific".

In February 2025, during debate on a bill that would require public schools to teach age-appropriate LGBTQ sex education, Rose introduced an amendment that would have allowed parents to opt their children out of such classes. The amendment was rejected in a 38–92 vote. In September 2025, she signed onto a letter to the Maryland State Board of Education opposing a proposal that would allow the state superintendent to overrule local Board of Education decisions.

=== Environment ===
In January 2019, Rose said she supported solar energy, but opposed building solar farms over farmland. In May 2021, Rose expressed interest in removing the state-imposed restriction requiring Carroll County to preserve 100,000 acres of agriculture, saying that the land preservation limited county housing opportunities.

=== Foreign policy ===
In March 2007, Rose said she supported the Iraq War and criticized media coverage of the war. In October 2016, she said she did not support allowing more Syrian refugees, arguing that the country should first support its homeless veterans.

=== Gun policy ===
Rose supports the Second Amendment and opposes gun control laws, arguing that they increase crime and make people less safe. She also supports legislation to make Maryland a "shall issue" state. In July 2022, following the U.S. Supreme Court's ruling in New York State Rifle & Pistol Association, Inc. v. Bruen, Rose signed onto a letter to the attorney general of Maryland asking him to address the issue.

=== Minimum wage ===
During the 2019 legislative session, Rose said she opposed legislation to raise the state minimum wage to $15 an hour, arguing that it would worsen competition between Carroll County and Pennsylvania.

=== Redistricting ===
In March 2019, Rose said she supported Governor Larry Hogan's proposed redraw of Maryland's congressional maps—which saw Maryland's 6th congressional district redrawn to include Frederick and Carroll counties, thereby making it more favorable to Republicans.

=== Social issues ===
In August 2024, Rose endorsed the Safeguard American Voter Eligibility Act, a federal bill that would require voters to show proof of citizenship when registering to vote.

=== Taxes ===
In August 2026, during debate on a proposed constitutional amendment on redistricting, Rose introduced an amendment that would prohibit any automatic tax increases without legislative approval.

== Personal life ==
Rose is married to her husband, Michael Richards. Together, they have six children and live in Westminster, Maryland. She attends the Faith Family Church in Finksburg, Maryland.

== Electoral history ==
Maryland House of Delegates District 5 Republican primary election, 2018
Party	Candidate	Votes	%
Republican	Susan W. Krebs (incumbent)	9,566	31.0
Republican	Haven Shoemaker (incumbent)	8,811	28.5
Republican	April Rose (incumbent)	8,350	27.0
Republican	David Ellin	4,176	13.5

Maryland House of Delegates District 5 election, 2018
Party	Candidate	Votes	%
Republican	Susan Krebs (incumbent)	39,236	30.9
Republican	April Rose (incumbent)	33,991	26.8
Republican	Haven Shoemaker (incumbent)	33,658	26.5
Democratic	Emily Shank	19,484	15.4
Write-in		516	0.4

Maryland House of Delegates District 5 election, 2022
Party	Candidate	Votes	%
Republican	April Rose (incumbent)	33,971	33.1
Republican	Christopher Bouchat	33,286	32.4
Republican	Chris Tomlinson	32,485	31.7
Write-in		2,872	2.8
