= Christopher Eric Bouchat =

American politician (born 1967)

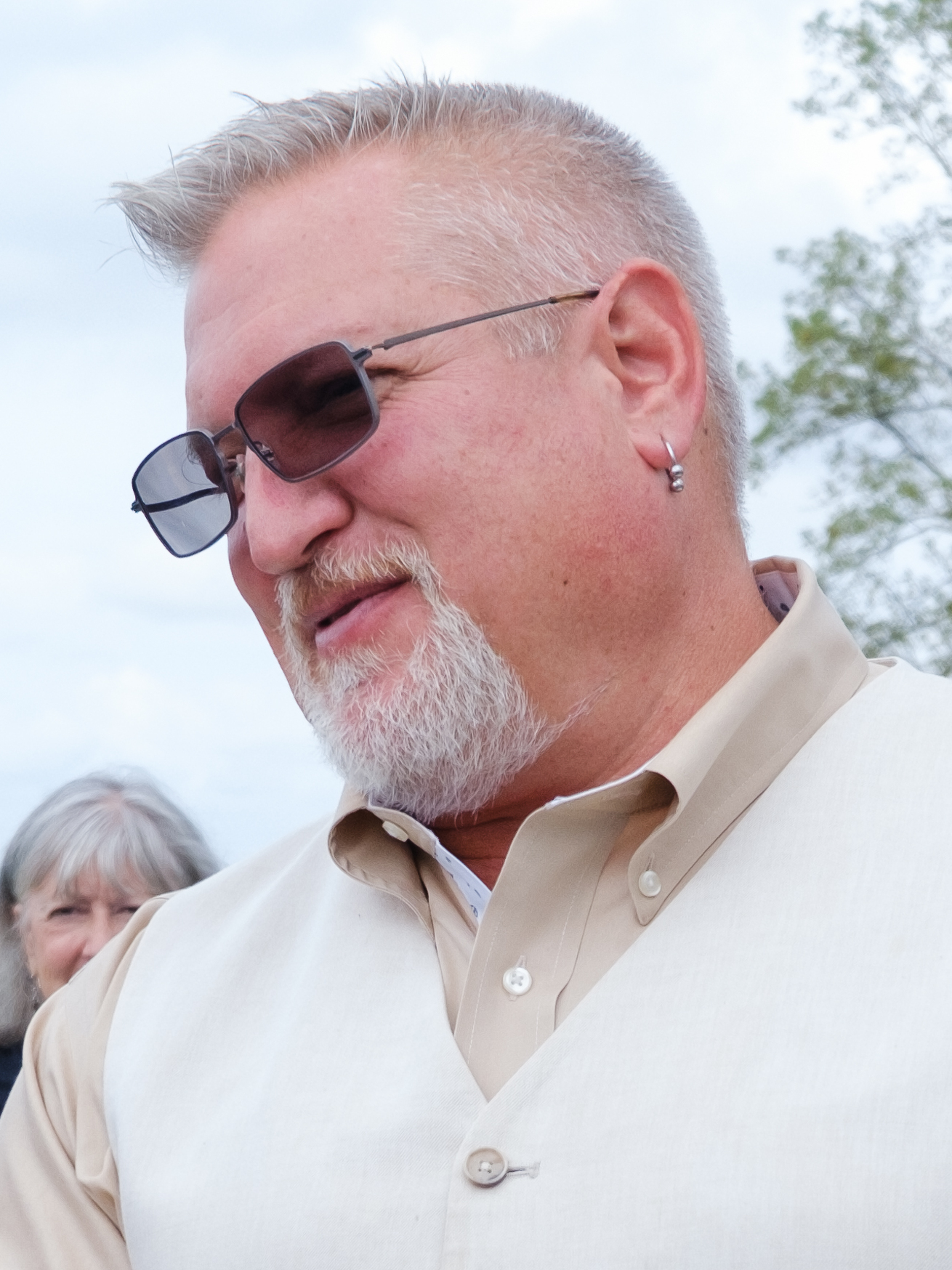
- Bouchat in 2023

Member of the Maryland House of Delegates from the 5th district
- Incumbent
- Assumed office January 11, 2023 Serving with Chris Tomlinson and April Rose
- Preceded by: Susan W. Krebs

Member of the Carroll County Board of Commissioners from the 4th district
- In office December 4, 2018 – December 5, 2022
- Preceded by: Richard Rothschild
- Succeeded by: Michael Guerin

Personal details
- Born: October 2, 1967 (age 58) Baltimore, Maryland, U.S.
- Party: Republican
- Spouse(s): Carmelita Seda-Carothers (div. 1997) April Shook (div. 2007)
- Children: 2 (Note: One child is deceased.)
- Education: Catonsville Community College; University of Maryland, Baltimore County
- Website: Campaign website

Christopher Eric Bouchat (born October 2, 1967) is an American politician. He is a member of the Maryland House of Delegates for District 5, which encompasses most of Carroll County, Maryland and a small part of southeastern Frederick County, Maryland. He was previously a member of the Carroll County Board of Commissioners from 2018 to 2022, representing District 4 in southwest Carroll County.

== Background ==
Bouchat graduated from St. Augustine's Catholic School (now St. Augustine Elementary School) and Howard High School. He attended the Howard Vocational-Technical Center, where he earned a welding certificate, Catonsville Community College, where he earned a degree in business administration, and the University of Maryland, Baltimore County, where he earned a degree in political science. Bouchat worked as a welder with Patrick Aircraft Tank Systems in Columbia, Maryland, before starting his own welding business in 1994.

== Political involvement ==
Bouchat first became involved in politics in 1992, when he ran for the United States House of Representatives in Maryland's 3rd congressional district. In 1994, he unsuccessfully ran for the Maryland Senate in District 12, receiving 37 percent of the vote in the Republican primary.

From 2003 to 2004, Bouchat served on the Baltimore County Republican Central Committee.

In 2006, Bouchat ran for the Carroll County Board of Commissioners, challenging the three incumbent Republican commissioners. He once again ran for the Carroll County Board of Commissioners in 2010.

In October 2013, Bouchat filed to run for the Maryland House of Delegates in District 9A, seeking to succeed outgoing state delegate Gail H. Bates. Bouchat was the top vote-getter in the Carroll County part of the district, but lost the primary to Howard County Republicans Warren Miller and Trent Kittleman, both of whom went on to win the general election.

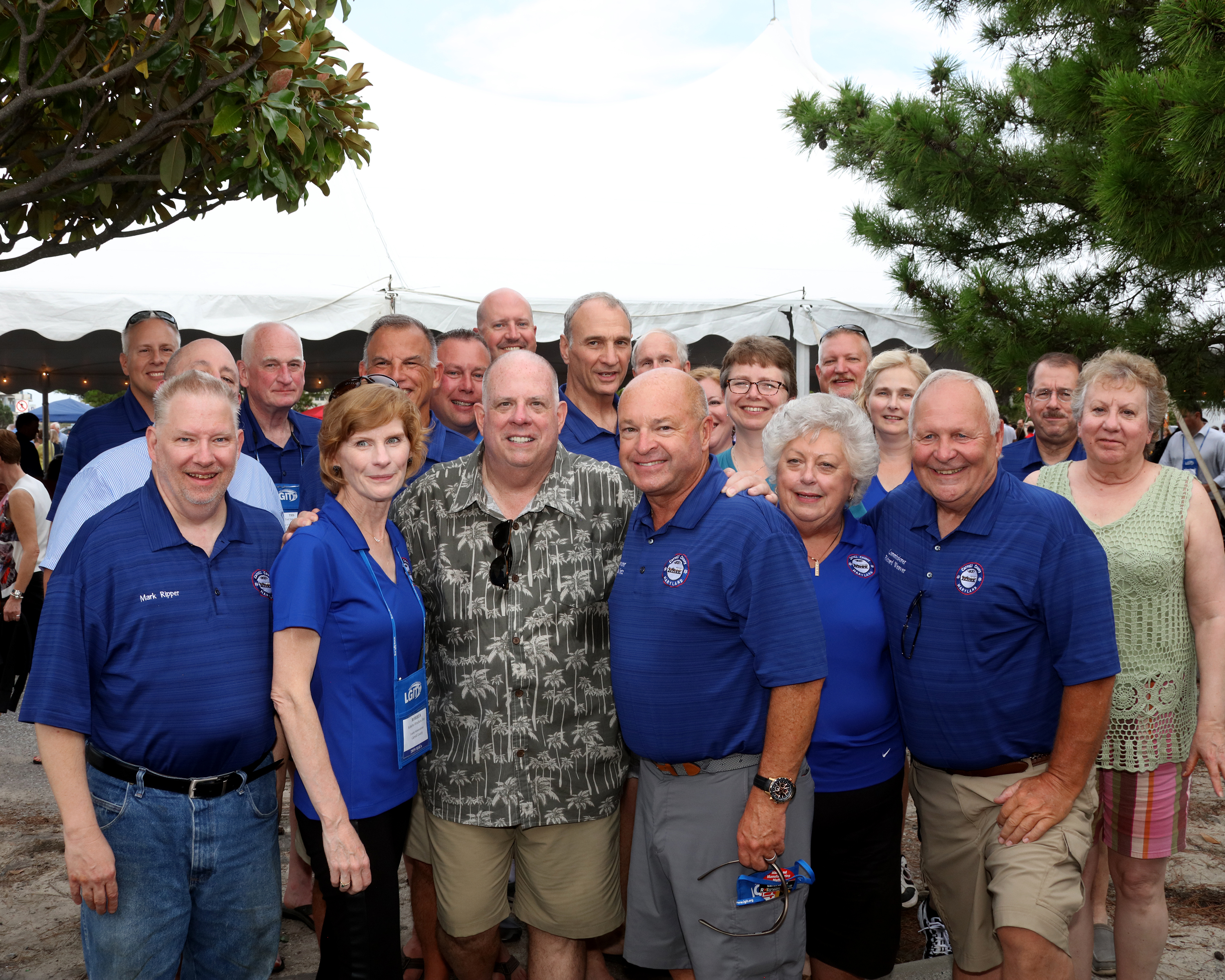
Bouchat (far back) with other members of the Carroll County Board of Commissioners and Governor Larry Hogan, 2019

In 2018, Bouchat ran for the Carroll County Board of Commissioners in District 4, seeking to succeed outgoing county commissioner Richard Rothschild. He won the Republican primary in June, receiving 44.1 percent of the vote. He defeated Democrat Paul Johnson in the general election, receiving 65.5 percent of the vote, and was sworn in on December 4, 2018. On July 26, 2019, Bouchat announced that he would not seek re-election to a second term in 2022.

In March 2020, Bouchat expressed interest in running for the Maryland General Assembly. In December, Bouchat filed to fill a vacancy in the Maryland House of Delegates that was left vacant by the resignation of state delegate Warren Miller. His candidacy was endorsed by former state delegates Al Redmer Jr. and Donald E. Murphy. On January 6, 2021, fellow candidate Reid Novotny was selected to fill the rest of Miller's term. In 2022, Bouchat filed to run for the Maryland House of Delegates in District 9A, but was later redrawn into District 5. Bouchat won the Republican primary on July 20, receiving 12.1 percent of the vote. He ran unopposed in the general election.

=== Redistricting lawsuits ===
In 2012, Bouchat filed a lawsuit challenging the state's legislative redistricting plan, in which he pleaded to the Maryland Court of Appeals to establish a new legislative body that would have each county represented by two state senators and for the county's population to determine its number of state delegates, each belonging to a single-member district. The Court of Appeals issued an order upholding the state's redistricting plan, denying Bouchat's arguments against it. In January 2013, Bouchat appealed the case by filing a writ of certiorari to the Supreme Court of the United States. The Supreme Court denied the petition on April 15.

In early 2015, Bouchat filed a lawsuit in the Carroll County Circuit Court challenging the state's legislative redistricting plan, which was dismissed after the judge determined that the court did not have jurisdiction over the matter. In August 2015, Bouchat again filed a lawsuit challenging the state's legislative redistricting plan, blaming the composition of District 9A for his loss in the 2014 elections.

=== Maryland House of Delegates ===
Bouchat was sworn into the Maryland House of Delegates on January 11, 2023. He was a member of the House Judiciary Committee.

==== Tenure ====
During his tenure, Bouchat had an uneasy relationship with the Republican caucus, criticizing his party's votes as "completely worthless" and voting with Democrats at a time when many in his party were against COVID-era rules, including pro forma sessions. He also claimed that being a state delegate caused his welding business to lose half a million dollars in income over four years. In March 2023, Bouchat sent a letter to his House Republican colleagues in which he questioned their tactics during floor debates, asserting that they were being too performative during floor debates and urging them to "look inward for corrective measures that increase our future success rates". Later that week, six of the most vocal members of the House Republican Caucus released a letter criticizing Bouchat's comments, arguing that the party was able to reach its 50-seat minority in 2014 by speaking out against Democratic taxes and spending. Bouchat agreed that Republicans should contest Democrats in the 2026 legislative elections, but said "we need to stop annoying them" until then.

In February 2023, Bouchat, a member of the Frederick County Delegation, said that he would not vote or make any motions during the delegation's weekly meetings. In an email to The Frederick News-Post, he said that delegation members who represent districts mostly in Washington or Carroll counties were in violation of a Maryland Supreme Court ruling if they voted in Frederick County Delegation meetings. Only 2.6 percent of District 5 residents, or about 3,500 people, live in Frederick County. In 1995, an opinion from the Attorney General of Maryland stated that county delegations are "not subject to the 'one-person/one-vote' requirement" of the Equal Protection Clause of the Fourteenth Amendment of the U.S. Constitution.

In September 2024, Bouchat said that he would not run for re-election in 2026, instead expressing interest in a run for statewide office. In June 2025, he told The Baltimore Sun that he was preparing to announce that he would run for governor of Maryland in 2026, seeking to challenge Democratic incumbent Wes Moore. In February 2026, Bouchat said that he would not file to run for governor in 2026, instead opting to run in 2030.

==== 2026 legislative session protest ====
In February 2026, after it became apparent that the House Judiciary Committee would not move his bill to raise the salaries of some sheriffs to match that of the state's attorneys in their counties, Bouchat sent an email to House Republican leaders announcing that he would be voluntarily resigning from his committee and encouraging all House Republicans to do the same, saying that Republicans should "let this General Assembly be a shipwreck and watch it happen without us having any blame symbolically". A spokesperson for House Speaker Joseline Peña-Melnyk confirmed that Bouchat had also sent her a letter announcing his intent to resign from his committee, but said this was not something he had the ability to do. Bouchat also began skipping floor sessions—only appearing to register his presence during the first quorum call of the day and leave a bust of Socrates on his desk—but continued to respond to constituents and attend functions.

In March 2026, state senator Justin Ready and state delegates Chris Tomlinson and April Rose, all of whom represent the 5th district alongside Bouchat, issued a statement calling for Bouchat's resignation, citing his decision to skip floor sessions. Bouchat refused the legislators' calls, saying that his resignation would give an unfair advantage to whoever succeeds him, but offered to donate some of his salary as a lawmaker to charities of the lawmakers' choosing. On March 27, Bouchat sent another email to Republican Caucus leaders accusing them of using Tomlinson against him in a public pressure campaign, writing that leaders were exploiting him "to be your bitch" and that "if we were in prison, you would be sexually abusing him". House minority leader Jason C. Buckel and Tomlinson both denied Bouchat's claims, with Tomlinson stating that he was "nobody's bitch". Later that month, he left $1,000 checks for each of his 5th district colleagues that he said were a gift to his colleagues to donate to the charities of their choice; the legislators all voided and returned these checks to Bouchat, with Ready describing the checks as "bribe-like" and reporting it to the Joint Committee on Legislative Ethics.

In April 2026, state delegate Lauren Arikan filed a resolution of expulsion against Bouchat over his protest. The Constitution of Maryland allows for the removal of a lawmaker for failure to act, but only one lawmaker, former state senator Frank McCourt, has ever come close to being expelled for failure to act. Bouchat dismissed the resolution as "truly a distraction and seems disingenuous" and questioned the need to expel him, noting that the General Assembly was entering its last full week before adjourning sine die. Anne Healey, the chair of the House Rules and Executive Nominations Committee, where Arikan's resolution was referred, told The Baltimore Banner that she was unlikely to bring the resolution up for consideration, saying that the committee doesn't "normally have hearings on late-filed bills".

Bouchat returned for the August 2026 special session on congressional redistricting, during which he introduced legislation that would create a 188-member body of citizens, elected every 10 years to draw legislative and congressional district boundaries. After Bouchat's bill did not get a hearing, he continued his protest against the Maryland General Assembly.

== Political positions ==
=== COVID-19 pandemic ===
In April 2020, Bouchat voted against closing the Northern Landfill in Westminster, Maryland for 15 days to reduce risk of spreading COVID-19. Later that month, he voted to reopen the landfill early with reduced hours and restrictions preventing residents outside the county from using it.

In June 2020, Bouchat attended and spoke at a Reopen Maryland rally in Westminster to protest the state's COVID-19 restrictions. At the rally, he suggested allowing businesses to set their own policies on when people need to wear masks. In July 2020, he wrote an op-ed for the Carroll County Times that questioned the value of wearing masks in public. His remarks on the COVID-19 pandemic were criticized by Robert Wack, the deputy health officer for the Carroll County Health Department, who wrote in a letter to the Carroll County Times later that month that Bouchat's "dangerously ignorant opinions are a direct threat to the health and well-being of the county".

In August 2021, Bouchat suggested that the Board of Commissioners boycott the annual Maryland Association of Counties Summer Conference over its masking recommendations, saying that he had cancelled his attendance to the event after learning about the policy. He later told Maryland Matters that he did not oppose masks or vaccines, but opposed mandates. In December 2021, Bouchat was the only commissioner to vote against instituting a modified mask policy at Carroll County government facilities, which required unvaccinated county government employees to wear a mask while indoors. In February 2022, Bouchat declined to attend the State of the County address at the Carroll Arts Center, which was attended by all other county commissioners, because of its indoor mask-wearing requirement. He instead opted to protest outside the building by handing out copies of a written speech to those walking in.

=== Environment ===
In October 2025, Bouchat said that he planned to introduce a bill during the 2026 legislative session to eliminate Maryland's Vehicle Emissions Inspection Program, calling the program "obsolete" and overly costly for taxpayers.

=== Government ===
In July 2019, Bouchat introduced a bill that would place a question on the 2020 ballot that, if approved, would change Carroll County's form of government from a commission to a charter. After the Board of Commissioners voted to hold off on discussions on converting to a charter government, Bouchat announced that he would not seek re-election to a second term as county commissioner in 2022. In November 2020, Bouchat voted to pass a resolution that would establish a nine-member committee to write a charter; the resolution failed to pass in a 2–3 vote.

In January 2021, Bouchat recused himself as a non-voting member of the county's Planning and Zoning Commission, and soon after filed motions to eliminate the non-voting positions from the county's Board of Education and Planning and Zoning Commission. Both motions failed to gain a second and were not voted upon.

=== Immigration ===
During the 2026 legislative session, Bouchat opposed a bill to prohibit counties from entering into 287(g) program agreements with U.S. Immigration and Customs Enforcement, saying that the bill puts "an over-emphasis on anxieties and concerns of our illegal citizens over the concerns of public safety of Maryland citizens".

=== Redistricting ===
In September 2022, Bouchat said he supported a constitutional amendment to the Constitution of Maryland establishing a 188-member redistricting commission to draw Maryland's congressional and legislative maps, with each of its members elected proportionally to a county's population and in non-partisan elections.

=== Social issues ===
In June 2020, Bouchat joined a Black Lives Matter protest in Westminster. Later that month, he proposed creating a heritage commission to recognize the history and achievements of African Americans in Carroll County.

In February 2022, Bouchat distributed copies of a printed speech at the annual State of the County address, in which he wrote that he believed that the board of commissioners would benefit from not being made up of "old Caucasian males," calling on women to "step up and take control of our local government".

During the 2025 legislative session, Bouchat voted against a bill that would create a commission to study reparations for slavery in Maryland. Following its passage, he wrote to Maryland Attorney General Anthony Brown to suggest Brown begin compiling historical data to use in potential legal action that may arise against the Maryland Democratic Party for state legislation enacted concerning slavery and Jim Crow laws.

In September 2025, Bouchat signed onto a letter to the Maryland State Board of Education opposing a proposal that would allow the state superintendent to overrule local Board of Education decisions.

=== State and national politics ===
In 2016, Bouchat ran as an unaffiliated delegate to the Republican National Convention in Maryland's 8th congressional district. He said that he would vote for Donald Trump on the first ballot if the voters sent him to the Convention, and hoped that Trump would pick John Kasich as his running mate.

In January 2021, Bouchat condemned the January 6 United States Capitol attack and compared the presidential transition to what happens with the Board of Commissioners:

I just ask people to step back, take a deep breath and allow things to unfold and allow the transition of power to take place. Even though I did not vote for the president-elect, he is our president and everyone must respect that, just as my colleagues are setting the example now. We transitioned from President Wantz to President Rothstein. That is a wonderful thing.

In 2022, Bouchat endorsed former Maryland Secretary of Commerce Kelly Schulz for governor.

=== Taxes ===
In March 2023, Bouchat voted against an amendment that would remove a provision that indexed the state's gas tax to the consumer price index. The amendment failed by a 38–90 vote, with Bouchat being the only House Republican to vote against it. During his 2026 gubernatorial campaign, he told The Baltimore Sun that he supported changing Maryland's tax system to a 3% flat tax on all income, capital gains, and sales.

== Personal life ==
Bouchat divorced his first wife, Carmelita Seda-Carothers, in 1997, defending himself in court during the divorce proceedings. That same year, Bouchat was convicted of second-degree assault in a domestic abuse with Seda-Carothers. In July 2007, he divorced his second wife, April Elizabeth Shook, who claimed that Bouchat had physically and verbally assaulted her as they sought their divorce. Her abuse claims were thrown out by Judge Thomas Stansfield after no evidence proving the abuse could be produced. In September, Bouchat filed a lawsuit against Shook, charging her claim that he had physically abused her destroyed his campaign.

In February 2014, the Internal Revenue Service placed a $42,526 tax lien on Bouchat, which was the result of embezzlement by his daughter, Tawni Bouchat, whom he had employed as a bookkeeper at his own business. The lien led him to initiate criminal charges against Tawni for stealing $21,120 from his company, which she was found guilty of in January 2015. In November 2018, after winning election to the Carroll County Board of Commissioners, Bouchat settled the tax lien by paying $13,000 to the IRS.

Tawni Bouchat died of a fentanyl overdose in 2017, which he says "threw me into a depression, it threw me into alcoholism, so I always advise people out there when you've suffered a loss of someone very close you are extremely vulnerable to become an addict yourself."

Bouchat is a Christian.

== Electoral history ==
Maryland's 3rd congressional district Republican primary election, 1992
Party	Candidate	Votes	%
Republican	William T. S. Bricker	3,667	24.2
Republican	Mark Kevin White	3,307	21.9
Republican	Christopher Eric Bouchat	2,659	17.6
Republican	Fredric M. Parker	1,885	12.5
Republican	Wyatt A. Rogers	1,714	11.3
Republican	Joseph M. Werner Jr.	1,013	6.7
Republican	Edward Lerp	890	5.9

Maryland Senate District 12 Republican primary election, 1994
Party	Candidate	Votes	%
Republican	David P. Maier	3,021	63.3
Republican	Christopher Eric Bouchat	1,748	36.7

Carroll County Commissioner Republican primary election, 2006
Party	Candidate	Votes	%
Republican	Julia Walsh Gouge	7,100	17.1
Republican	Dean L. Minnich	6,300	15.1
Republican	Michael D. Zimmer	6,053	14.5
Republican	Perry L. Jones, Jr.	5,703	13.7
Republican	Mary Kowalski	4,344	10.4
Republican	Douglas Eugene Myers	3,532	8.5
Republican	Douglas Howard	3,138	7.5
Republican	David Greenwalt	2,802	6.7
Republican	Christopher Eric Bouchat	2,205	5.3
Republican	Wade Emory Miracle	439	1.1

Carroll County Commissioner District 4 Republican primary election, 2010
Party	Candidate	Votes	%
Republican	Richard S. Rothschild	1,391	36.5
Republican	Perry Leroy Jones, Jr.	795	20.9
Republican	Christopher Eric Bouchat	763	20.0
Republican	David Jones	711	18.7
Republican	Hank Martin	150	3.9

Maryland House of Delegates District 9A Republican primary election, 2014
Party	Candidate	Votes	%
Republican	Warren E. Miller	3,354	29.2
Republican	Trent Kittleman	2,574	22.4
Republican	Frank Mirabile	2,509	21.8
Republican	Kyle Lorton	1,620	14.1
Republican	Christopher Eric Bouchat	1,426	12.4

Carroll County Commissioner District 4 Republican primary election, 2018
Party	Candidate	Votes	%
Republican	Christopher Eric Bouchat	1,155	44.1
Republican	W. Paul Burkett	897	34.3
Republican	Bret D. Grossnickle	422	16.1
Republican	Sean Shaffer	143	5.5

Carroll County Commissioner District 4 election, 2018
Party	Candidate	Votes	%
Republican	Christopher Eric Bouchat	9,981	65.5
Democratic	Paul Johnson	5,221	34.3
Write-in		28	0.2

Maryland House of Delegates District 5 Republican primary election, 2022
Party	Candidate	Votes	%
Republican	April Rose	8,636	22.6
Republican	Chris Tomlinson	6,847	17.9
Republican	Christopher Eric Bouchat	4,620	12.1
Republican	Sallie B. Taylor	4,470	11.7
Republican	Stephen A. Wantz	4,373	11.4
Republican	Dennis E. Frazier	3,563	9.3
Republican	Scott Willens	3,765	9.8
Republican	Scott Jendrek	1,993	5.2

Maryland House of Delegates District 5 election, 2022
Party	Candidate	Votes	%
Republican	April Rose	33,971	33.11
Republican	Christopher Bouchat	33,286	32.44
Republican	Chris Tomlinson	32,485	31.66
Write-in		2,872	2.80
