= Chris Tomlinson (politician) =

American politician (born 1986)

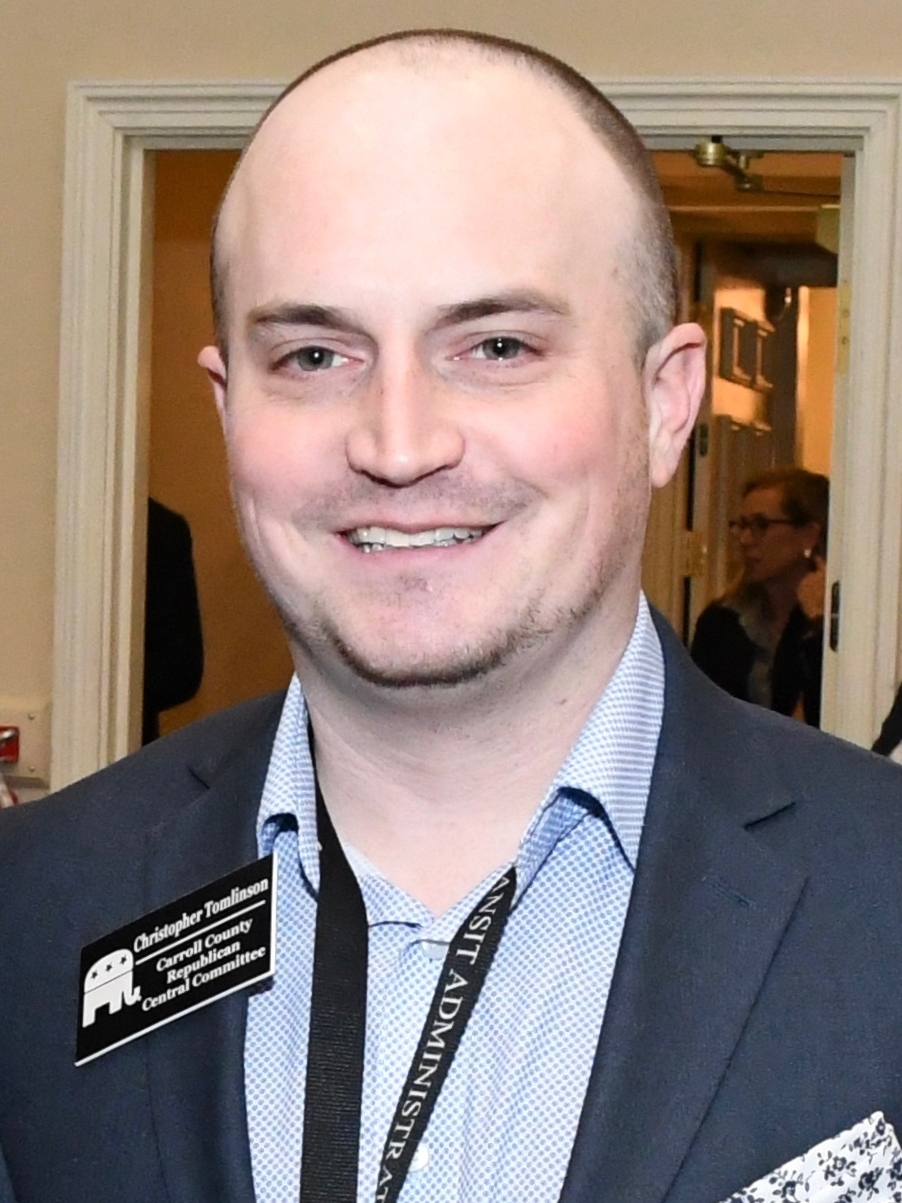

Member of the Maryland House of Delegates from the 5th district
- Incumbent
- Assumed office January 11, 2023 Serving with Christopher Eric Bouchat and April Rose
- Preceded by: Haven Shoemaker

Personal details
- Born: August 29, 1986 (age 40) Baltimore, Maryland, U.S.
- Party: Republican
- Spouse: Molly
- Children: 1
- Education: Towson University (BS)
- Website: Campaign website

Christopher L. Tomlinson (born August 29, 1986) is an American politician who has been a member of the Maryland House of Delegates for District 5 in Carroll and Frederick County, Maryland, since 2023. He previously served as the third vice chairman of the Maryland Republican Party from 2020 to 2022.

== Early life and education ==
Tomlinson was born in Baltimore on August 29, 1986. He graduated from North Carroll High School in 2004, and later attended Towson University, where he earned a Bachelor of Science degree in Electronic Media and Film in 2009.

== Career ==
Tomlinson joined the Maryland Transit Administration in 2017 as a quality assurance and quality control manager in procurement. He subsequently served as a Board of Public Works coordinator from 2018 to 2021 before becoming a contracts manager at the agency in 2021.

=== Early political career ===
In 2015, he unsuccessfully ran for the mayor of Manchester, Maryland. His candidacy was challenged by the Town's Board of Supervisors of Elections, who denied his certification after arguing that he did not live in the town when he filed to run for mayor. Tomlinson challenged the board's decision, claiming that he had lived in the town since April 2014. The board reversed its decision a few days later, allowing Tomlinson to run for mayor. Tomlinson was defeated in the mayoral election by incumbent mayor Ryan Warner, receiving 27.3 percent of the vote in a three-way race.

In November 2017, Tomlinson was appointed to the Carroll County Republican Central Committee and in 2018, he successfully ran in a county-wide race to keep his Committee seat for a full four-year term. In 2020, he was elected to serve as the third vice chairman of the Maryland Republican Party.

=== Maryland House of Delegates ===
In 2022, Tomlinson filed to run for the Maryland House of Delegates in District 5. In the primary election, he ran on a Republican slate with State Senator Justin Ready and fellow District 5 State Delegate April Rose. Tomlinson finished in second place behind Rose, advancing to win one of the three seats awarded to the top three finishers in District 5 in the general election, in which no Democrat challenged the Republican candidates.

Tomlinson was sworn in on January 11, 2023. He was a member of the House Judiciary Committee from 2023 to 2025. In 2026, he was reassigned to the new House Government, Labor, & Elections (GLE) Committee where he was appointed the Committee's Ranking Republican Member. In late 2024, Tomlinson was elected by his Carroll County Delegation peers to serve as the Chair of the Delegation and he remains in that position. Over his first term, Tomlinson passed multiple bills related to election transparency at the municipal level and providing small businesses with more State contracting opportunities.

== Political positions ==
=== Education ===
In September 2025, Tomlinson signed onto a letter to the Maryland State Board of Education opposing a proposal that would allow the State Superintendent to overrule local Board of Education decisions.

=== Fiscal issues ===
During his 2022 House of Delegates campaign, Tomlinson said he planned to introduce legislation in the 2023 legislative session that would improve human resources practices in state government by requiring the fiscal notes of bills to include the number of new employees needed to accomplish the legislation's goals. He also said he supported legislation to limit the powers of the Maryland State Board of Education.

=== Housing ===
In June 2026, Tomlinson argued that Maryland needed to simplify permitting and reduce regulatory burdens on builders to encourage new housing development.

=== Immigration ===
In November 2025, Tomlinson opposed bills to ban 287(g) program agreements in Maryland, saying that the House Republican Caucus would "use every tool at our disposal to stop this bill from passing". He also opposed a bill that would set mandatory minimum safety standards on private immigration detention facilities, expressing skepticism about whether the state could regulate federal government facilities.

=== National politics ===
Tomlinson supported President Donald Trump in the 2020 presidential election, attending a Trump rally in Hershey, Pennsylvania in December 2019. He was a delegate to the 2024 Republican National Convention, pledged to Trump.

=== Social issues ===
Tomlinson has repeatedly introduced the Victoria, Scottie, Ashleigh, and Yader's Law, which would impose an up to 20-year prison sentence on people who distribute heroin or fentanyl that leads to the death or serious bodily injury of another.

In August 2024, Tomlinson endorsed the Safeguard American Voter Eligibility Act, a federal bill that would require voters to show proof of citizenship when registering to vote.

During the 2026 legislative session, Tomlinson supported the Protecting Arists' Creative Expression Act, which prevents artistic works from being misinterpreted as literal confessions in trials.

== Personal life ==
Tomlinson is married to his wife, Molly. Together, they live in Melrose, Maryland, and have a daughter.

== Electoral history ==
2015 Manchester mayoral election
Candidate	Votes	%
Ryan Warner (incumbent)	249	50.7
Chris Tomlinson	134	27.3
Tammy Black	108	22.0

Carroll County Republican Central Committee Election, 2018
Party	Candidate	Votes	%
Republican	Karen Leatherwood	6,306	8.2
Republican	Seth Shipley	5,985	7.7
Republican	David L. Brauning, Jr.	5,970	7.7
Republican	Justin Mudgett	5,051	6.5
Republican	Richard Rothschild	4,940	6.4
Republican	Christopher Tomlinson	4,642	6.0
Republican	Lawrence W. Helminiak	4,540	5.9
Republican	Katherine Adelaide	4,450	5.8
Republican	Cathey Allison	4,146	5.4
Republican	E. Scott Hollenbeck	3,907	5.1
Republican	Fallon E. Patton	3,783	4.9
Republican	Christopher R. Weaver	3,715	4.8
Republican	Brandon Matthew Holland	3,691	4.8
Republican	Ryan Finch	3,688	4.8
Republican	William Harrison	3,424	4.4
Republican	Thom Meads	3,357	4.3
Republican	Frank Elgersma	2,342	3.0
Republican	Robert A. Kurland	1,844	2.4
Republican	Douglas L. Johnston	1,494	1.9

Maryland House of Delegates District 5 Republican Primary Election, 2022
Party	Candidate	Votes	%
Republican	April Rose (incumbent)	8,636	22.6
Republican	Chris Tomlinson	6,847	17.9
Republican	Christopher Eric Bouchat	4,620	12.1
Republican	Sallie B. Taylor	4,470	11.7
Republican	Stephen A. Wantz	4,373	11.4
Republican	Dennis E. Frazier	3,563	9.3
Republican	Scott Willens	3,765	9.8
Republican	Scott Jendrek	1,993	5.2

Maryland House of Delegates District 5 election, 2022
Party	Candidate	Votes	%
Republican	April Rose (incumbent)	33,971	33.11
Republican	Christopher Bouchat	33,286	32.44
Republican	Chris Tomlinson	32,485	31.66
Write-in		2,872	2.80
