= Arlington Baptist High School =

Arlington Baptist School

Location
- 3030 North Rolling Road; Baltimore, Maryland 21244; United States
- Coordinates: 39°20′23″N 76°45′43″W

Information
- School type: Private Christian school
- Religious affiliation: Baptist
- Established: 1969
- CEEB code: 210031
- NCES School ID: 00580952
- Gender: Co-ed
- Age range: Pre-K – 12
- Campus type: Suburban
- Mascot: Eagles
- Website: ArlingtonBaptistSchool.org

Arlington Baptist School is a private Christian high school located in Baltimore, Maryland. It was established in 1975, with the first seniors graduating in 1976 and is an extension of Arlington Baptist Church which was founded in 1947 by Peter Bisset. As the ministry grew (it reached its peak in the early 1980s), a lower school was added in 1969 and the High School in 1975. During this time, expansion of the ministry took place and a nursing home, retirement complex and a cemetery were added. Although not directly affiliated, there were other "sister ministries" such as the Peter & John Trustworthy Bookstore, a radio station - WRBS-FM 95.1, and River Valley Ranch (a Western-themed Christian summer camp and conference center). When dramatic increases in medical care occurred in the early 1980s, the nursing home was sold.

The film Saved! was based on director and writer Brian Dannelly's experiences at various schools in the Baltimore area, including Arlington.

Arlington Baptist School is located just outside the Beltway in Baltimore, Maryland. The name "Arlington" comes from the original area where the church was founded - near the Pimlico Race Course in Baltimore. The mascot for the school is the eagle. Arlington was one of the first Christian high schools in the region to achieve Middle States Accreditation in the early 1980s as well as the Excellence In Education award from then Secretary of Education, William Bennett. From the mid-1990s until 2004, Arlington participated in the MIAA and IAAM athletic conferences in the Baltimore/Washington metro area, with certain teams such as the men's and women's basketball teams winning the state championship for their conference several times.

== Notable alumni ==
- April Rose, member of the Maryland House of Delegates
