= Justin Ready =

American politician (born 1982)

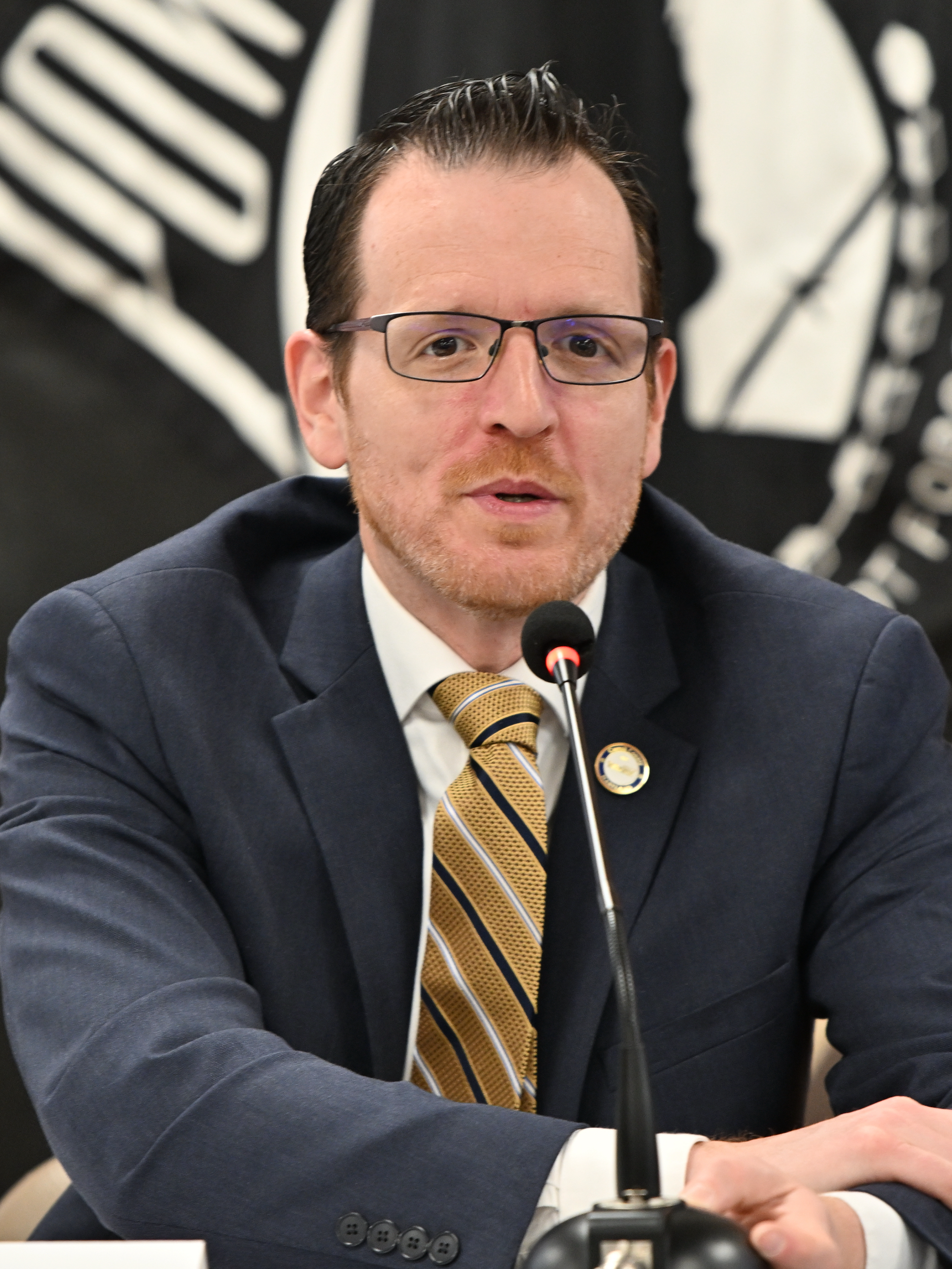
- Ready in 2023

Member of the Maryland Senate from the 5th district
- Incumbent
- Assumed office February 2, 2015
- Appointed by: Larry Hogan
- Preceded by: Joseph M. Getty

Member of the Maryland House of Delegates
- In office January 12, 2011 – February 2, 2015
- Preceded by: Tanya Thornton Shewell
- Succeeded by: April Rose
- Constituency: District 5A (2011–2015); 5th district (2015)

Personal details
- Born: April 15, 1982 (age 44) Mobile, Alabama, U.S.
- Party: Republican
- Spouse: Ruth
- Children: 2
- Education: Carroll Community College (AA); Salisbury University (BA)

Justin D. Ready (/ˈriːdiː/ REE-dee; born April 15, 1982) is an American politician who has served as a member of the Maryland Senate since 2015, representing District 5 in Carroll County. He previously represented the district in the Maryland House of Delegates from 2011 to 2015.

== Early life and education ==
Ready was born in Mobile, Alabama, but moved to Westminster, Maryland, at the age of 11 after living in Mississippi. He attended Littlestown Christian Academy, and at 13-years old made the honor roll. Ready graduated from Carroll Community College in 2002, and afterwards attended Salisbury University, where he earned a Bachelor of Arts degree in political science in 2004.

== Political career ==
Ready became interested in politics at a young age. After graduating from Salisbury, he worked as a field director for state senator E. J. Pipkin's 2004 U.S. Senate campaign. He later worked as a legislative aide to state delegate J. B. Jennings from 2004 to 2006, afterwards working as the chief of staff for state senator Janet Greenip.

In April 2008, the Maryland Republican Party named Ready as its executive director, replacing John Flynn. He served in this position until July 2009, when he was fired by party chairman James Pelura for "personnel reasons". Ready's firing eventually led to the removal of Pelura as chairman of the Maryland Republican Party. Ready later served as an interim executive director from July to December 2011.

Also in 2008, Ready unsuccessfully ran for delegate to the Republican National Convention, pledged to Mike Huckabee.

=== Maryland House of Delegates ===
On January 5, 2010, Ready announced that he would run for the Maryland House of Delegates in District 5A, challenging incumbent state delegates Nancy R. Stocksdale and Tanya Thornton Shewell. He won the Republican primary, placing first with 39.3 percent of the vote, and later defeated Democrats Francis X. Walsh and Sharon L. Baker in the general election alongside Stocksdale. Ready was sworn in on January 12, 2011, and served as a member of the Health and Government Operations Committee. He ran for re-election to a second term in 2014. Ready was a member of Larry Hogan's Change Maryland organization, and later served Hogan's transition team following his upset victory in the 2014 Maryland gubernatorial election.

In 2011, Ready served as a co-chair for Rick Perry's 2012 presidential campaign in Maryland. He later ran for delegate to the Republican National Convention pledged to Perry, receiving 1.2 percent of the vote.

=== Maryland Senate ===
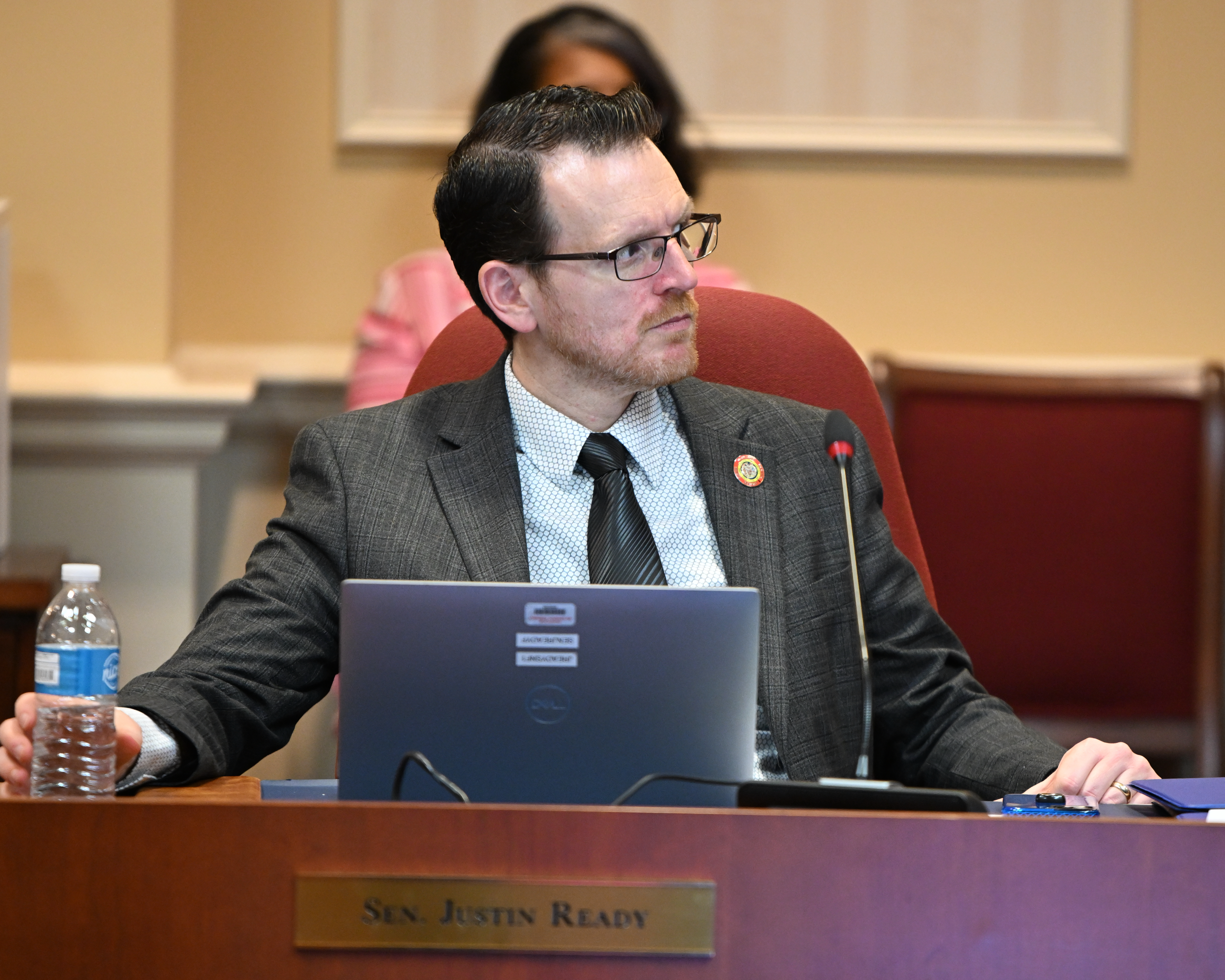
Ready in the Senate Finance Committee, 2023

In January 2015, following the resignation of state senator Joseph M. Getty to serve as the chief legislative officer to Governor Larry Hogan, Ready applied to fill the vacancy left by Getty in the Maryland Senate. The Carroll County Republican Central Committee nominated Ready alongside Dave Wallace and County Commissioner Robin Bartlett Frazier to fill the seat. Hogan appointed Ready to the seat on February 2, and he was sworn in on the same day. Ready was elected to a full four-year term in 2018.

Ready served as a member of the Judicial Proceedings Committee from 2015 to 2021, afterwards serving on the Finance Committee. In October 2021, Ready was elected to serve as the Senate minority whip.

During the 2016 Republican Party presidential primaries, Ready participated in organizing activities for Ted Cruz. He celebrated Donald Trump's win in the 2016 United States presidential election, calling it a "pretty stunning repudiation of Washington, D.C., and the establishment, the media establishment, and sort of the coasts".

Ready endorsed Maryland Secretary of Commerce Kelly M. Schulz in the 2022 Maryland gubernatorial election. After Schulz was defeated by far-right state delegate Dan Cox in the Republican primary, Ready endorsed Cox, claiming that he would act as a counter on progressive legislation passed by the legislature.

== Political positions ==
During his tenure in the Maryland House of Delegates, Ready was a member of the legislature's Tea Party caucus. In January 2020, the American Conservative Union gave Ready a score of 76 percent on its annual legislative scorecard, the highest score among members of the Maryland Senate.

=== Crime ===
In the Maryland Senate, Ready repeatedly introduced and supported bills to increase penalties on violent crimes, including those involving guns. He has called crime in Baltimore "out of control and destabilizing our entire region", and has expressed skepticism on claims that gun control would decrease violent crime.

During the 2015 legislative session, Ready introduced a bill to increase penalties for human trafficking. The bill was withdrawn after activists expressed concerns that the bill's definition of "trafficker" was too broad.

In 2019, Ready introduced "Laura and Reid's Law", a bill to increase penalties for murdering a pregnant woman. The bill was named after Laura Wallen, a pregnant woman who was allegedly murdered by her boyfriend in September 2017. The bill passed and was signed into law by Governor Larry Hogan. He also introduced a bill that would prohibit courts from authorizing pretrial release for an individual accused of assaulting a police officer.

During the 2023 legislative session, Ready expressed concerns with and voted against Governor Wes Moore's appointment of Vincent Schiraldi as Maryland Secretary of Juvenile Services, pointing to Schiraldi's approach to reducing juvenile crime amid the state's "crisis in juvenile crime".

In March 2026, during debate on a bill to repeal the practice of automatically charging youth as adults for certain crimes, Ready introduced amendments that would require youth charged with use of a firearm in certain crimes to be charged in adult court, and to require that a youth who is repeatedly charged for one of the five proposed repealed charges in the bill be charged in adult courts. Both amendments were rejected in near party-line votes.

=== Education ===
In May 2015, Ready defended Governor Larry Hogan's decision to withhold $68 million in funding for Maryland's costliest public school systems, saying that the state needed to restrain its growth spending to settle its fiscal issues.

During the 2019 legislative session, Ready defended Governor Larry Hogan's executive order requiring public schools to start after Labor Day, claiming that the order resulted in "incredibly good" economic effects.

In October 2019, Ready expressed skepticism with the Kirwan Commission's recommendations, also known as the Blueprint for Maryland's Future, comparing them to the recommendations made by the Thornton Commission and arguing that it would be better to address achievement gap deficits in education locally rather than raising education funding statewide. He later voted against the Blueprint bill, arguing that it would have a significant negative impacts on the state's economy.

In February 2022, Ready signed onto a letter to the Maryland State Board of Education imploring the agency to rescind its COVID-19 mask mandate in schools, falsely claiming that masks were ineffective at limiting the spread of COVID-19.

During the 2023 legislative session, Ready introduced a bill to establish the "fundamental right to parents' rights" in education. In June 2025, he supported the U.S. Supreme Court's decision in Mahmoud v. Taylor, which overturned Montgomery County Public Schools's policy of not allowing opt-outs for instruction involving LGBTQ-inclusive storybooks, saying that the ruling "should serve as a wake-up call to education officials across Maryland". In September 2025, Ready wrote a letter to the Maryland State Board of Education opposing a proposal that would allow the state superintendent to overrule local Board of Education decisions.

=== Electoral reform ===
In 2016, Ready opposed a bill to automatically register people to vote when getting their driver's license at the Maryland Motor Vehicle Administration.

In March 2019, Ready said he supported Governor Larry Hogan's proposed redraw of Maryland's congressional maps—which saw Maryland's 6th congressional district redrawn to include Frederick and Carroll counties, thereby making it more favorable to Republicans—following the United States Court of Appeals for the Fourth Circuit's decision in Benisek v. Lamone. In June 2021, Ready participated in hearings for Hogan's Maryland Citizens Redistricting Commission, during which he advocated for districts that broke up communities as little as possible. He criticized the redrawn congressional districts passed by the legislature during the 2021 special legislative session, calling it "incredibly gerrymandered".

During the 2021 legislative session, Ready introduced a bill to require voters to show a government-issued voter ID before casting a ballot, citing what he called "major deficiencies" in the 2020 United States presidential election. The bill was reintroduced in 2022. In August 2024, Ready endorsed the Safeguard American Voter Eligibility Act, a federal bill that would require voters to show proof of citizenship when registering to vote.

In November 2025, after Governor Wes Moore organized a commission to review mid-decade redistricting in Maryland in response to Republican mid-decade redistricting efforts in various red states, Ready said he would introduce a bill to ban mid-decade redistricting, codify part of a 2022 ruling that struck down Maryland's original congressional redistricting plan as an "extreme partisan gerrymander", and require Maryland's congressional districts to be drawn by an independent redistricting commission. He opposed the map proposed by the Governor's Redistricting Advisory Commission, which would redraw Maryland's 1st congressional district to improve the Democratic Party's chances of winning it, saying that arguments that the proposed map is "saving democracy" should be "laughed out of the room". He added that those arguments would be more appropriate if the proposed redistricting plan had five Democratic districts and three Republican districts, but said he would still oppose.

During the 2026 legislative session, Ready opposed a bill that prohibits counties and municipalities from implementing voting systems that diminishes the ability of minority groups to elect candidates of its choice, calling it a "far-reaching policy" that would "lead to a lot of lawsuits that are going to cost taxpayers money".

=== Energy ===
Ready opposes the Maryland Piedmont Reliability Project, a proposed 70-mile power line that would run from Frederick to Baltimore County to provide power to data centers in Maryland and Virginia, pointing to its potential use of eminent domain to acquire properties along its proposed path. During the 2025 legislative session, he introduced two bills to limit the use of eminent domain against property owners by including legal fees and costs incurred by the owner in calculating the fair market value for a property, and setting the fair market value of farmland property at 350% of its highest appraised value. Ready voted against the Next Generation Energy Act, a bill to increase in-state power generation and battery energy storage while limiting how utilities could spend ratepayer dollars, saying that while he supported provisions in the bill to fast-track nuclear power and gas-fired power plants, the bill would require gas plants to "jump through a bunch of hoops" to speed up the permitting process.

Ready supports the expansion of nuclear power in Maryland and the United States, calling it the "future, largely, of widescale energy production". In December 2025, he blamed Maryland's investments in renewable energy for increasing energy prices, adding that he opposed proposals to accelerate renewable energy and would instead support bills to speed up permitting for nuclear and gas-fired power plants during the 2026 legislative session.

During the 2026 legislative session, amid increasing electricity prices in Maryland, Ready introduced legislation to withdraw Maryland from the Regional Greenhouse Gas Initiative, slow renewable energy mandates, and pause energy efficiency charges tied to the state's EmPOWER program. He also criticized proposals by Governor Wes Moore that would provide households with about $40 in one-time rebates funded by cuts to the state's Strategic Energy Investment Fund. In April 2026, Ready voted for the Utility RELIEF Act, an omnibus energy bill supported by Moore and Democratic legislative leaders, but expressed caution that Republican amendments added to the bill during debate may be removed in conference committee. After the conference committee report was adopted, Ready voted against the Utility RELIEF Act on final passage.

In June 2026, Ready said he was not entirely opposed to data centers, but said he supported requiring them to provide their own energy and fit with where they're built. He also supported studying the centers' impact on water and energy, as well as the greater revenue they could provide.

=== Gun policy ===
During the 2018 legislative session, Ready said he supported a bill to repeal several sections of the Firearms Safety Act, including a ban on assault rifles.

In 2019, Ready said he opposed a bill to abolish the state's Handgun Permit Review Board, which handled conceal carry applications. In June 2022, he celebrated the U.S. Supreme Court's ruling in New York State Rifle & Pistol Association, Inc. v. Bruen, which overturned Maryland's concealed carry laws. In 2023, Ready said he opposed the Gun Safety Act, a gun control bill that increased requirements to obtain a handgun permit and limited where guns could be publicly carried following the Bruen decision, saying that he anticipated the bill's "fiery end by the court" if passed.

=== Health care ===
Ready supports efforts to repeal Obamacare.

During the 2017 legislative session, Ready said he opposed a bill requiring companies to provide employees with five days of paid sick leave per year, which he claimed would exacerbate income inequality.

In 2019, Ready criticized the End-of-Life Option Act, which would have provided palliative care to terminally ill adults.

During the 2026 legislative session, Ready opposed the Vax Act, a bill that would allow the Maryland Department of Health to set vaccine recommendations for Marylanders independent of any federal guidelines, calling it unnecessary.

=== Immigration ===
Ready supported Question 4 in 2012, which sought to repeal Maryland's Dream Act, a bill that extended in-state tuition for undocumented immigrants, saying that the bill made Maryland appear as a sanctuary state.

In 2014, Ready condemned a proposal to house immigrant children at a former U.S. Army Reserve Center in Westminster, Maryland, and blamed the increase in immigrant children on President Barack Obama's immigration policies.

In 2017, Ready supported the Trust Act, a bill that would prohibit police from asking about a detainee's immigration or citizenship status. During the 2020 legislative session, he introduced legislation that would require state correctional facilities to cooperate with U.S. Immigration and Customs Enforcement (ICE), accusing detention centers in Prince George's and Montgomery counties of defying ICE requests. In 2021, he opposed the Dignity Not Detention Act, a bill that would end all contracts between state correctional facilities and ICE, arguing that it would make communities less safe.

In 2021, Ready said he opposed a bill to extend the state's earned income tax credit to non-citizens. In 2023, during debate on a bill to make the tax credit permanent, Ready introduced an amendment to phase out the credit for non-citizens, which was rejected in a 14–33 vote.

In November 2025, Ready criticized a bill to ban 287(g) program agreements in Maryland, saying that Maryland should instead keep 287(g) agreements in place "so that there's a clear process in place with how law enforcement is cooperating with ICE". During debate on the bill in January 2026, he introduced an amendment that would've required employers to use the federal E-Verify system to determine if someone is eligible for employment based on immigration status, which was rejected in a 13–31 vote. In April 2026, Ready opposed the Community Trust Act, a bill that would require ICE to present a judicial warrant to compel state action.

=== National politics ===
In October 2025, Ready blamed Democrats for the 2025 United States federal government shutdown, calling on congressional Democrats to "abandon the political theater" and pass a clean continuing resolution to keep the government funded.

In March 2026, Ready said he supported U.S. involvement in the 2026 Iran war. Following a spike in gas prices as a result of the war, he proposed a 30-day gas tax holiday, predicting that the gas price increase was temporary. Despite never introducing the bill to implement the gas tax holiday, Ready blamed Governor Wes Moore for the proposal failing to pass.

=== Policing ===
Ready describes himself as being pro-police, but supports citizen oversight over the police and military. He has criticized police reform bills passed by the Maryland General Assembly during the 2021 legislative session, including a bill regulating police use of force policies, which he called the "most dangerous provision in the police bill package".

During the 2023 legislative session, Ready introduced a bill that would allow police departments to negotiate contracts to purchase police body cameras, citing the state's 2025 deadline to have on-duty officers wearing body cameras. He also criticized a bill to give the attorney general of Maryland sole prosecutorial power over police-involved incidents, imploring legislators to instead pass bills to deal with violent crime. During the 2026 legislative session, Ready opposed a bill that would prohibit law enforcement officers from wearing face coverings, saying that lawmakers should reject the bill for "creating a system where you're going to allow local law enforcement to try to detain federal law enforcement for a civil violation of wearing a mask".

=== Social issues ===
During the 2012 legislative session, Ready voted against the Civil Marriage Protection Act, which legalized same-sex marriage in Maryland. He later supported a ballot referendum aimed at repealing the law, saying that he believed that the "institution of marriage" was between a man and a woman. In 2022, he defended a Carroll County Board of Education policy banning pride flags in schools. During the 2024 legislative session, Ready opposed a bill to provide legal protections to health care providers that provide gender-affirming care to out-of-state patients, arguing that it would expand access to gender-affirming care to minors.

In December 2018, Ready signed onto an amicus brief in the U.S. Supreme Court case American Legion v. American Humanist Association defending the cross-shaped Peace Cross monument in Bladensburg, Maryland.

During the 2019 legislative session, Ready voted against a bill to raise the age to buy tobacco and nicotine products from 18 to 21, calling it "government overreach".

During the 2021 legislative session, Ready introduced legislation that would give college athletes the right to profit off their names and likenesses. The bill passed and became law.

In March 2022, Ready said he opposed a bill to provide $3.5 million toward training medical professionals to provide abortions, calling it "reckless and wrong". During the 2023 legislative session, Ready sought to amend a bill creating a ballot referendum on codifying abortion access into the Constitution of Maryland to include a provision protecting the right to make reproductive decisions without being coerced by health care providers. The amendment was rejected.

In June 2025, Ready criticized Governor Wes Moore's initiative to give communities affected by racist policies greater access to $400 million in state grants and loans, saying that it would create "new injustices" at the cost of Maryland taxpayers.

== Personal life ==
Ready is married to his wife, Ruth. Together, they have two children and live in Manchester, Maryland.

== Electoral history ==
Maryland House of Delegates District 5A Republican primary election, 2010
Party	Candidate	Votes	%
Republican	Justin Ready	6,266	39.3
Republican	Nancy R. Stocksdale (incumbent)	4,196	26.3
Republican	William C. Niner	4,173	26.2
Republican	Dave Wallace	1,316	8.3

Maryland House of Delegates District 5A election, 2010
Party	Candidate	Votes	%
Republican	Justin Ready	21,226	38.4
Republican	Nancy R. Stocksdale (incumbent)	19,046	34.4
Democratic	Francis X. Walsh	7,688	13.9
Democratic	Sharon L. Baker	7,250	13.1
Write-in		110	0.2

Maryland House of Delegates District 5 election, 2014
Party	Candidate	Votes	%
Republican	Susan W. Krebs	35,701	28.6
Republican	Justin Ready (incumbent)	34,789	27.9
Republican	Haven Shoemaker	33,985	27.2
Democratic	Dorothy G. Scanlan	11,737	9.4
Democratic	Zachary Hands	8,210	6.6
Write-in		351	0.3

Maryland Senate District 5 Republican primary election, 2018
Party	Candidate	Votes	%
Republican	Justin Ready (incumbent)	10,745	100.0

Maryland Senate District 5 election, 2018
Party	Candidate	Votes	%
Republican	Justin Ready (incumbent)	39,568	71.5
Democratic	Jamie O'Marr	15,739	28.4
Write-in		63	0.1

Maryland Senate District 5 election, 2022
Party	Candidate	Votes	%
Republican	Justin Ready (incumbent)	39,484	96.1
Write-in		1,598	3.9
