= Carroll Community College =

Two-year college in Westminster, Maryland, US

- Motto: "Great Futures Take Shape Here"
- Type: Community College
- Established: 1993
- President: Dr. Rosalie Mince
- Location: Westminster, Maryland, United States; 39°31′49″N 76°59′36″W
- Campus: Rural, suburban
- Mascot: Lynx
- Website: http://www.carrollcc.edu/

Carroll Community College is a comprehensive institution serving the residents of Carroll County, Maryland, United States. Located in Westminster, Maryland, Carroll provides a wide range of educational opportunities, including associate degrees, professional certifications, workforce training, and personal enrichment programs for learners of all ages.

== Notable alumni ==
- Justin Ready, (born 1982), member of the Maryland State Senate and former member of the Maryland House of Delegates
