= Carmen M. Amedori =

American journalist and politician (1955–2024)

Member of the Maryland House of Delegates from the 5A district
- In office January 13, 1999 – June 30, 2004
- Preceded by: Ellen Willis Miller
- Succeeded by: Tanya Shewell

Personal details
- Born: November 25, 1955 Baltimore, Maryland, U.S.
- Died: June 9, 2024 (aged 68) Westminster, Maryland, U.S.
- Party: Republican
- Spouses: Robert DePaola (m. 1977, divorced): Jerry F. Barnes; Timothy Headley
- Children: 2
- Education: Stevenson University
- Profession: Paralegal and journalist

Carmen Michael Amedori (November 25, 1955 – June 9, 2024) was an American journalist and politician. She was elected in 1998 to the Maryland House of Delegates for District 5A, from Carroll County. After being re-elected in 2002 she served in the Maryland General Assembly until 2004, when she was appointed by Governor Bob Ehrlich to the state Parole Commission where she served until 2009. Amedori was a background actor and had a featured extra role on House of Cards and also played the lead in productions with Siren's Media. She was a writer and a licensed realtor.

== Early life and education ==
Carmen M. Amedori was born on November 25, 1955, in Maryland to an Italian family. She attended parochial and public schools. She graduated in 1977 from Stevenson University (then Villa Julie College). She also attended the Notre Dame of Maryland University.

== Career ==
Amedori worked as a paralegal for many years before becoming a journalist. She wrote for The Baltimore Sun, the Carroll County Times and Ocean City Today. Among other awards, she received the Distinguished Journalism Award from the Society of Professional Journalists.

She was appointed as a district court commissioner for Carroll County District 10, serving from 1991 to 1993. Amedori was a member of the Maryland Taxpayers' Association, the National Association of Legal Assistance, Citizens Against Government Waste, Citizens Against Big Charter Government, and Americans for Tax Reform. In 1998 she was serving as chairperson of the Carroll County Charter Board which she later led the charge to defeat.

Amedori was elected twice to the Maryland House of Delegates (1998 and 2002). While in the State House she served on the House Judiciary Committee, where she was ranking member in 2004. She also had the distinction of serving as assistant minority leader, as well as a minority whip.

In June 2004, the governor appointed her to a six-year term on the Maryland Parole Commission. In February 2010, Amedori announced her candidacy for US Senator, running against incumbent senator Barbara Mikulski, who had been serving for many years. Amedori dropped her bid for the Senate on April 16, 2010, announcing she would run for the office of Lieutenant Governor of Maryland, on the Republican Party ticket with Maryland gubernatorial candidate Brian Murphy.

Two weeks later Amedori left the Murphy ticket, endorsing former Maryland Governor Bob Ehrlich, Murphy's opponent in the Republican primary. She argued that Ehrlich had the best chance to beat current Maryland Governor Martin O'Malley in the general election. She said, "If there was going to be a loss to O'Malley, let it be Bob's loss."

That year Amedori moved from Carroll County to Maryland's Lower Eastern Shore to be with her 89-year-old father. On September 14, 2010, Amedori was elected to the Worcester County Republican Central Committee. She also served as Campaign Manager to a conservative candidate for the House of Delegates in State District 38B. Carmen returned to Carroll County in October 2013 where she had been a resident for 32 years and to the City of Westminster where she was a homeowner for 14 years.

=== Legislative notes ===
- Sponsored Parental Notification and Judicial-bypass legislation
- Pro-Second Amendment, lead sponsor on CCW bills, as well as right to protect property legislation
- Fiscal Conservative

=== Election results ===
- 2002 Race for Maryland House of Delegates – District 5A

Voters to choose two:

Name	Votes	Percent	Outcome
Carmen Amedori, Rep.	19,195	34.0%	Won
Nancy R. Stocksdale, Rep.	20,480	36.3%	Won
Kimberly J. Petry, Dem.	6,195	11.0%	Lost
Robert P. Wack, Dem.	10,520	18.6%	Lost
Other Write-Ins	49	0.1%	Lost

- 1998 Race for Maryland House of Delegates – District 5A

Voters to choose three:

Name	Votes	Percent	Outcome
Carmen Amedori, Rep.	21,969	24%	Won
Nancy R. Stocksdale, Rep.	27,665	30%	Won
Joseph M. Getty, Rep.	25,114	27%	Won
Ellen Willis Miller, Dem.	16,735	18%	Lost

== Personal life and death ==
In 1977, Amedori married Robert DePaola; they had two daughters together, After some years, they divorced. Amedori later married attorney Jerry F. Barnes, who then became State's Attorney in Carroll County Maryland. Carmen was later married to Timothy Headley of Westminster, Maryland.

Amedori died at her home in Westminster, Maryland on June 9, 2024, at the age of 68.

== Honors and awards ==
- School Bell Award, Maryland State Teachers' Association, 1988 (sustained coverage)
- 1989 (spot news). Distinguished Journalism Award, Society of Professional Journalists
- Sigma Delta Chi, Maryland Chapter, 1989.
- Honorable Mention, Features Award, Maryland-Delaware-DC Press Association, 1989
