= Nancy R. Stocksdale =

American politician (born 1934)

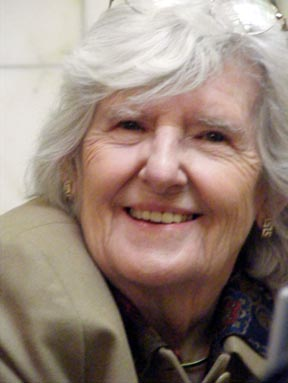

Member of the Maryland House of Delegates from District 5A
- In office January 1, 1995 – January 14, 2015
- Preceded by: Richard C. Matthews
- Succeeded by: Haven Shoemaker

Personal details
- Born: June 22, 1934 (age 92) Owings Mills, Maryland
- Party: Republican

Nancy R. Stocksdale (born June 22, 1934) is an American politician, who served as a delegate in the Maryland House of Delegates from 1995 to 2015.

== Background ==
Nancy Stocksdale served as one of the delegates for District 5A, which covers portions Carroll County. Stocksdale was first elected in 1994 along with Democrat Richard N. Dixon and Republican Joseph M. Getty.

In 1998, Stocksdale again won reelection, this time with the most votes of the three elected candidates. The Republicans swept out the Democrats with Carmen Amedori winning the seat previously held by Dixon.

In 2002, the district lines were redrawn and votes were only allowed to select two candidates. Stocksdale and Amedori won reelection defeating Democrats Kimberly Petry and Robert Wack. Getty went on to serve newly elected Republican governor Bob Ehrlich as Policy and Legislative Director.

In 2006, Stocksdale again won reelection, this time with Tanya Shewell, when Amedori was appointed to the Maryland Parole Commission.

Delegate Stocksdale retired in 2014.

== Education ==
Stocksdale attended Franklin High School in Reisterstown. She later graduated from Western Maryland College in 1956 with her B.S. in Home Economics.

== Career ==
After college, Stocksdale taught for over 34 years in the Baltimore County Public Schools system. She raised a family of five children and one foster child while also starting several local businesses. Nancy and her husband sold World Book Encyclopedia door to door throughout the 70's and into the 80's, sharing the love of learning with Maryland families. She and her husband, William "Jack" Stocksdale rose to become managers of the DelMarVa tri-state area. She has served 3 terms as the President of the Carroll County Republican Club. Nancy Stocksdale was elected to the Carroll County Central Committee in 1990. During her term, she worked in Representative Roscoe Bartlett's office.

As a member of the House of Delegates, Nancy has been the assistant Minority Leader since 2007, Deputy Minority Whip from 2003–06, and served on the Appropriations Committee and the Joint Committee on Children, Youth, and Families.

=== Legislative notes ===
- voted against the Clean Indoor Air Act of 2007 (HB359)
- voted against in-state tuition for illegal immigrants in 2007 (HB6)
- voted in 2005 to allow the operation of video lottery terminals in the state (HB1361)
- voted in 1999 to allow electricity customers to choose their providers, and other changes to laws governing regulation of electricity utilities (HB703)
- voted for income tax reduction in 1998 (SB750)

== Election results ==
- 2006 Race for Maryland House of Delegates – District 5A

Voters to choose two:

Name	Votes	Percent	Outcome
Tanya Thorton Shewell, Rep.	18,785	32.9%	Won
Nancy R. Stocksdale, Rep.	20,630	36.1%	Won
Ann Darrin, Dem.	9,489	16.6%	Lost
Frank Henry Rammes, Dem.	8,192	14.3%	Lost
Other Write-Ins	57	0.1%	Lost

- 2002 Race for Maryland House of Delegates – District 5A

Voters to choose two:

Name	Votes	Percent	Outcome
Carmen Amedori, Rep.	19,195	34.0%	Won
Nancy R. Stocksdale, Rep.	20,480	36.3%	Won
Kimberly J. Petry, Dem.	6,195	11.0%	Lost
Robert P. Wack, Dem.	10,520	18.6%	Lost
Other Write-Ins	49	0.1%	Lost

- 1998 Race for Maryland House of Delegates – District 5A

Voters to choose three:

Name	Votes	Percent	Outcome
Carmen Amedori, Rep.	21,969	24%	Won
Nancy R. Stocksdale, Rep.	27,665	30%	Won
Joseph M. Getty, Rep.	25,114	27%	Won
Ellen Willis Miller, Dem.	16,735	18%	Lost
