= Susan W. Krebs =

American politician (born 1959)

Susan Krebs
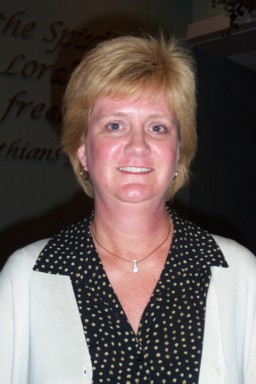

Member of the Carroll County Board of Commissioners from the 5th district
- Incumbent
- Assumed office September 11, 2025
- Appointed by: Wes Moore
- Preceded by: Ed Rothstein

Member of the Maryland House of Delegates
- In office January 8, 2003 – January 11, 2023
- Preceded by: Emil B. Pielke
- Succeeded by: Robert Flanagan (9B); Christopher Eric Bouchat (5th)
- Constituency: District 9B (2003–2015); 5th district (2015–2023)

Personal details
- Born: December 4, 1959 (age 66) Baltimore, Maryland, U.S.
- Party: Republican
- Education: Towson University (BA)
- Occupation: Accountant, financial consultant, politician

Susan Wolf Krebs (born December 4, 1959) is an American politician who is a member of the Carroll County Board of County Commissioners from the 5th district since 2025. A member of the Republican Party, she was a member of the Maryland House of Delegates from 2003 to 2023.

== Background ==
Susan Krebs was the delegate representing Maryland District 5, which comprises southeast Carroll County, including Eldersburg, Marriottsville, and parts of Sykesville. In 2002, she defeated Democrat Kenneth Holniker with 62% of the vote.

In 2002, Krebs survived a close Republican primary election to her political challenger, Larry Helminiak, receiving 52% of the vote. In the general election, however, she solidly defeated her Democratic challenger Anita Lombardi Riley, who only received 27% of the vote.

== Education ==
Krebs attended Woodlawn High School in Baltimore County. She earned her B.A. from Towson State University in 1981.

== Career ==
After college, Krebs was an accountant and financial consultant. She has been a member of the Freedom Area Citizens Council, various Parent Teacher's Associations (PTA'S). In 2002, she won election to the house of Delegates and was sworn in on January 8, 2003.

In February 2022, Krebs announced that she would not seek re-election to the House of Delegates in 2022.

In August 2025, after Governor Wes Moore nominated Carroll County commissioner Ed Rothstein to serve as the Secretary of the Maryland Department of Veterans and Military Families, Krebs applied to serve the remainder of Rothstein's term on the Carroll County Board of Commissioners. The Carroll County Republican Central Committee nominated Krebs to serve the remainder of his term on August 15, 2025. She was appointed to the seat by Governor Wes Moore and sworn in on September 11, 2025.

=== Legislative notes ===
- voted for slots in 2005 (HB1361)
- voted against in-state tuition for illegal immigrants (HB6)

== Election results ==
- 2010 Race for Maryland House of Delegates – District 9B

Voters to choose three:

Name	Votes	Percent	Outcome
Susan Krebs, Rep.	12,377	73.53%	Won
Anita Lombardi Riley, Dem.	4,403	26.16%	Lost
Other Write-Ins	52	0.31%	Lost

- 2006 Race for Maryland House of Delegates – District 9B

Voters to choose three:

Name	Votes	Percent	Outcome
Susan Krebs, Rep.	12,059	72.1%	Won
Anita Lombardi Riley, Dem.	4,621	27.6%	Lost
Other Write-Ins	38	0.2%	Lost

- 2002 Race for Maryland House of Delegates – District 9B

Voters to choose three:

Name	Votes	Percent	Outcome
Susan Krebs, Rep.	10,093	62%	Won
Kenneth Holniker, Dem.	6,152	37.8%	Lost
Other Write-Ins	27	0.1%	Lost
