= Blueprint for Maryland's Future =

Maryland, US law

Maryland State Legislature
- Full name: Blueprint for Maryland's Future - Implementation
- Introduced: February 7, 2020
- House voted: March 6, 2020 (96-41); February 8, 2021 (97-38)
- Senate voted: March 12, 2020 (37-9); February 10, 2021 (31-15)
- Sponsors: Adrienne A. Jones; Bill Ferguson
- Governor: Larry Hogan
- Bill: HB 1300
- Associated bills: SB 1000
- Website: Legislation

Status: Current legislation

The Blueprint for Maryland's Future, also referred to as just The Blueprint, is a landmark law in the U.S. state of Maryland. The bill represents a 10-year plan that aims to implement a series of education reforms recommended by the Commission on Innovation and Excellence in Education, including expanding universal preschool, increasing funding for schools with high concentrations of poverty, increasing pay and opportunities for teachers, and creating career pathways for high school students. The law, as passed, will increase state education funding by $3.8 billion each year until 2032.

== Background ==
During the 2016 legislative session, the Maryland General Assembly unanimously passed House Bill 999, establishing the Commission on Innovation and Excellence in Education (also known as the "Kirwan Commission") to study whether state formulas in education are equitable and provide students with enough resources for preparing for college. The commission was seen as a successor to the Maryland Commission on Education Finance, Equity, and Excellence (also known as the "Thornton Commission", named after its chairman Alvin Thornton), whose final report led to the 2002 Bridge to Excellence in Public Schools Act that increased public school funding by more than 100 percent in the decade following its implementation. At the time of the commission's creation, Maryland students were performing at or below the median among the 50 states in reading and math, faced large achievement gaps based on race and income, and suffered a severe teacher shortage and retention problems.

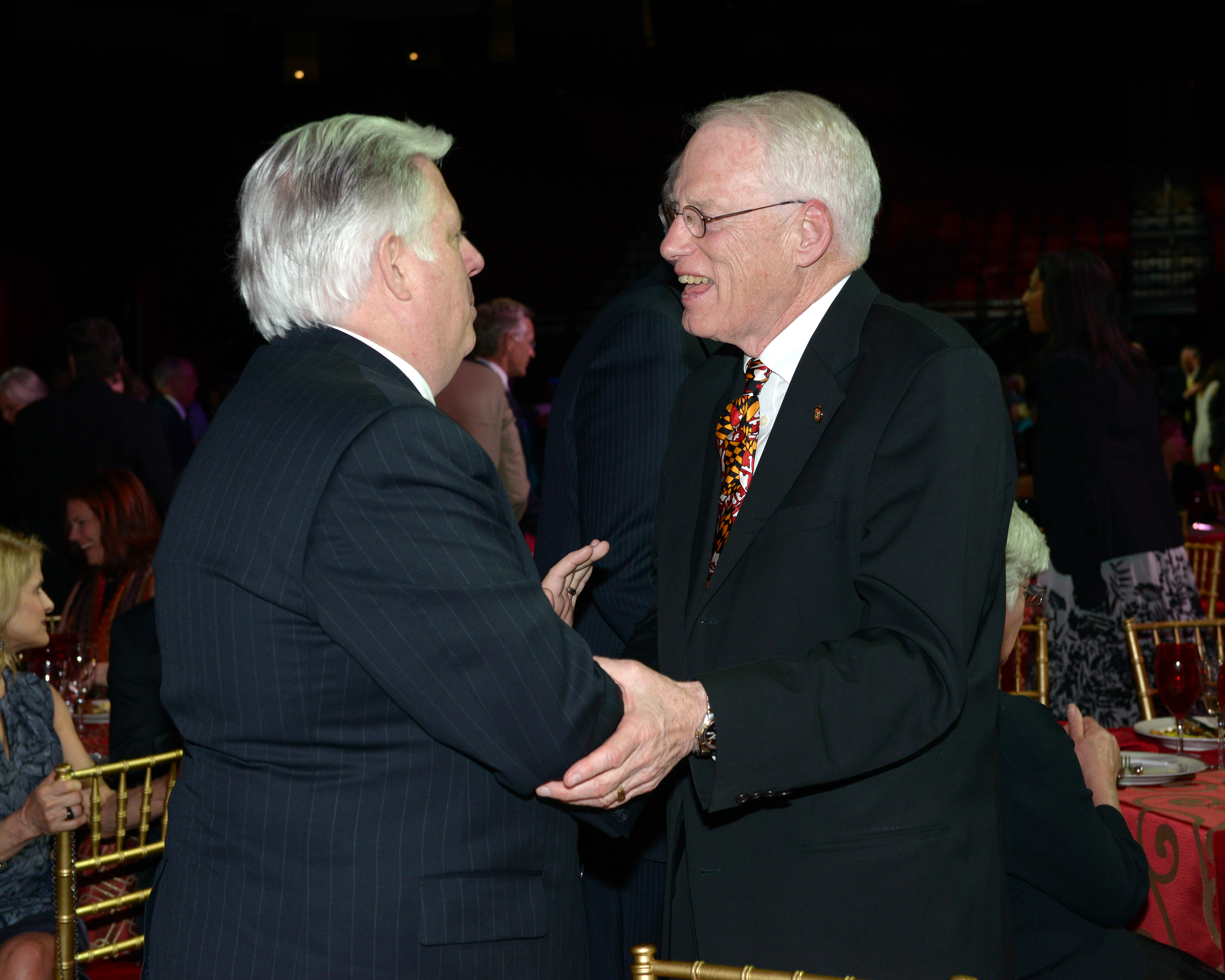
Hogan speaks with Kirwan at his retirement event, 2015

In August 2016, Governor Larry Hogan appointed University System of Maryland chancellor emeritus William Kirwan to chair the commission, which consisted of 26 members including Kirwan. The commission was tasked with making recommendations in five major policy areas, including early childhood education, increasing teacher pay, implementing rigorous school curricula, providing additional resources to struggling schools, and creating accountability for underperformance. The commission studied the practices of top-performing school systems in nations including Finland, Singapore, Canada, and China, as well as the U.S. states of Massachusetts and New Hampshire.

In January 2019, the commission released an interim report, which included several proposals for boosting Maryland schools, including universal preschool for low-income 3- and 4- year olds, hiring and retaining teachers, increasing education standards, and establishing an accountability system to oversee the implementation of the commission's recommendations.

The commission released its final 243-page report on November 21, 2019. The report included $4 billion in education reform proposals, with the state contributing $2.8 billion and counties and Baltimore City about $1.2 billion, and sought full implementation of its recommendations by fiscal year 2030. 19 of the commission's 22 members voted in favor of the proposal, with only state senator Mary Beth Carozza and Queen Anne's County commissioner Jack Wilson voting against it, citing concerns about funding. According to Maryland Matters, the plan's recommendations included:

- $529 million toward expanding universal preschool to low-income four- and three-year olds
- $168 million toward increasing teacher advancement opportunities and salaries to $60,000 or more
- $26 million toward helping students reach "college and career readiness" by the end of 10th grade
- $692 million in "concentration of poverty" grants
- $182 million for special education funding
- $57 million toward supporting students learning English
- $3.9 million toward establishing an Accountability and Implementation Board to support the Blueprint's implementation

== Passage ==
The Blueprint for Maryland's Future bill was first introduced during the 2019 legislative session as House Bill 1413 (Senate Bill 1030) by Speaker of the Maryland House of Delegates Michael E. Busch. The bill included $725 million in education funding through fiscal year 2022, which would pay for school-based health centers, free school lunches for schools in impoverished areas, raises for teachers, and grants for improving teacher standards. The bill passed the Maryland General Assembly on April 3, 2019, and became law without Governor Larry Hogan's signature.

Passing the Blueprint for Maryland's Future became a major issue during the 2020 legislative session following the release of the commission's final report in November 2019. The Blueprint bill was introduced during the 2020 legislative session by Maryland Senate president Bill Ferguson and Speaker of the Maryland House of Delegates Adrienne A. Jones. While in the Maryland Senate, multiple amendments were made to the bill, including a "checkpoint" to test the success of the reforms by 2026, as well as another that would limit the amount of extra spending on the Blueprint if the state's revenues drop by 7.5 percent per year. The bill passed the Maryland House of Delegates by a 96–41 vote on March 7, and later passed the Maryland Senate by a vote of 37–9. The bill was sent back to the House for final passage, where it passed by a 96–38 vote on March 17.

In May 2020, Governor Hogan vetoed the Blueprint for Maryland's Future, citing the massive hit on Maryland's economy from the COVID-19 pandemic. This veto also blocked the implementation of the Build to Learn Act, a bill that would have provided $2.2 billion in extra funding for school construction which contained a provision preventing it from going into effect until the Kirwan bill became law. On February 12, 2021, the Maryland General Assembly voted to override Hogan's veto of the Kirwan bill. Leaders of the Maryland General Assembly also introduced a bill to adjust the implementation timeline of the Blueprint to account for Hogan's veto, which passed and became law without Governor Hogan's signature.

=== Debate over funding ===
The final report's release in November 2019 sparked a debate between both Democrats and Republicans in the Maryland General Assembly. In January 2019, the Maryland Center on Economic Policy, a liberal think tank, released a report detailing ways to pay for the Blueprint for Maryland's Future through changes to the state's income tax, corporate tax, and sales tax systems. The Maryland Department of Budget and Management estimated that paying for the proposals would require a 39 percent in the personal income tax, an 89 percent increase in the sales tax, or a 535 percent increase in the property tax. In January 2020, the leaders of the Maryland General Assembly said they would not raise income, property, or sales tax rates to pay for the Blueprint's recommendations.

Democratic lawmakers evaluated a series of proposals aimed at raising funds to pay for the Kirwan reforms, including cuts to tax credits, a carbon tax, and closing corporate tax loopholes. In January 2020, progressive members of the Maryland House of Delegates proposed a package of bills to pay for the Blueprint, including eliminating subsidy programs, combined reporting for multi-state corporations, and restructuring the state's income tax brackets. In March 2020, Maryland House Democrats introduced a bill that would apply the state's 6% sales tax to digital services, including video streaming services, cable and satellite plans, and online news subscriptions. Hogan vetoed the digital sales tax bill after it passed the Maryland General Assembly on May 7, 2020, citing the COVID-19 pandemic. The Maryland General Assembly voted to override the veto on February 12, 2021.

As of March 2023, the Blueprint is fully funded only until 2026 and will run into deficit in 2027. David Romans, coordinator of fiscal and policy analysis for the Department of Legislative Services, said in March 2023 that "ongoing revenues in the Blueprint fund are nowhere near enough to pay for the costs, which continue to grow each year through 2034".

=== Support and opposition ===
Support for the Blueprint for Maryland's Future consisted of a coalition of Democratic state legislators, educators, and labor unions. The opposition to the Blueprint consisted of Maryland Republican politicians.

Arguments supporting the Blueprint included rewriting state funding formulas, improving education outcomes for students, increasing support for teachers, and leveling educational inequities. Arguments in opposition to the Blueprint included how the reforms were funded. Republican members of the Maryland House of Delegates bitterly fought the proposals, arguing that they would cost taxpayers $32 billion over 10 years without a clear way to pay for them. Republican criticism continued through the 2021 legislative session, during which Republican leaders including Michael Hough and Bryan Simonaire called the bill's passage fiscally irresponsible. Simonaire called on Democratic lawmakers to scrap the bill in January 2021, saying that its recommendations had become outdated because of the changes made to learning during the COVID-19 pandemic. State senator Paul G. Pinsky, who led efforts to pass the Blueprint bill in 2020, acknowledged these criticisms in passing the Kirwan 2.0 bill, saying that the focus of the bill was "getting students up a grade level... who got crushed during the last 14 months."

Governor Hogan repeatedly said that he would veto any proposed tax increase to pay for the Kirwan reforms, referring to the workgroup as the "Kirwan Tax Hike Commission" in public statements, even though the panel's role was not to change state tax rates. Kirwan called Hogan's criticism of the Blueprint "unfair" and urged him to back the plan. Hogan received further criticism for his subsequent veto of the bill, with members of the Maryland Parent-Teachers Association urging members of the Maryland General Assembly to override his veto during the 2021 legislative session. In May 2020, the Maryland House Minority Caucus sent a letter to Hogan urging him to veto the Blueprint bill and tax bills to fund it, citing the economic impact of the COVID-19 pandemic on the state.

In January 2020, Prince George's County executive Angela Alsobrooks and Baltimore mayor Jack Young were supportive of the Kirwan Commission's proposed reforms, but expressed concern with the costs associated with implementing the recommendations and asked lawmakers to alter the funding formulas in the bill. Alsobrooks said that she would not raise taxes on Prince George's County residents to pay for the reforms, and told reporters that funding the Blueprint reforms would require the county to defund its police department. In response to Alsobrooks and Young's concerns, the bill was amended to limit the bill's financial burden on poorer areas of the state, cutting the costs for Baltimore City and Prince George's County by over 50 percent.

Notable supporters

- U.S. Senator Ben Cardin
- U.S. Senator Chris Van Hollen
- U.S. Representative Elijah Cummings
- U.S. Representative Steny Hoyer
- Thomas V. Miller Jr., President of the Maryland Senate
- Paul G. Pinsky, state senator
- Eric Luedtke, Majority Leader of the Maryland House of Delegates
- Maggie McIntosh, state delegate
- Angela Alsobrooks, Prince George's County executive
- Marc Elrich, Montgomery County executive
- Johnny Olszewski, Baltimore County executive
- Steuart Pittman, Anne Arundel County executive
- Catherine Pugh, mayor of Baltimore
- Jack Young, mayor of Baltimore
- Wes Moore, author and CEO of the Robin Hood Foundation
- American Civil Liberties Union of Maryland
- Maryland Association of Boards of Education
- Maryland Association of Counties
- Maryland Parent-Teachers Association
- Maryland State Education Association

Notable opponents

- Governor Larry Hogan
- Comptroller Peter Franchot
- Bryan Simonaire, Minority Leader of the Maryland Senate
- Mary Beth Carozza, state senator
- Steve Hershey, state senator
- Michael Hough, state senator
- Nic Kipke, Minority Leader of the Maryland House of Delegates
- Dan Cox, state delegate
- Nino Mangione, state delegate
- Haven Shoemaker, state delegate
- Kathy Szeliga, state delegate

=== 2022 gubernatorial election ===
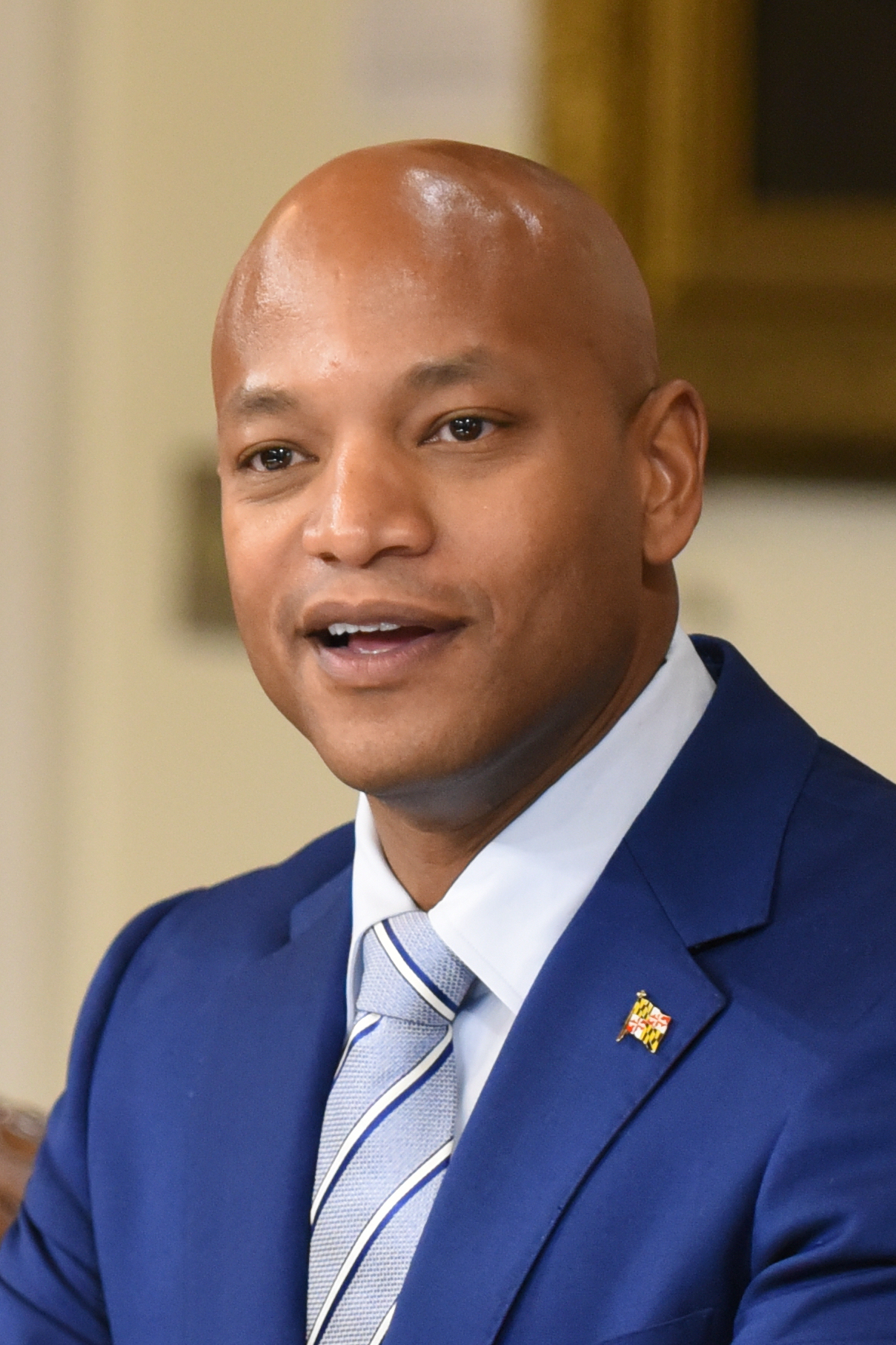
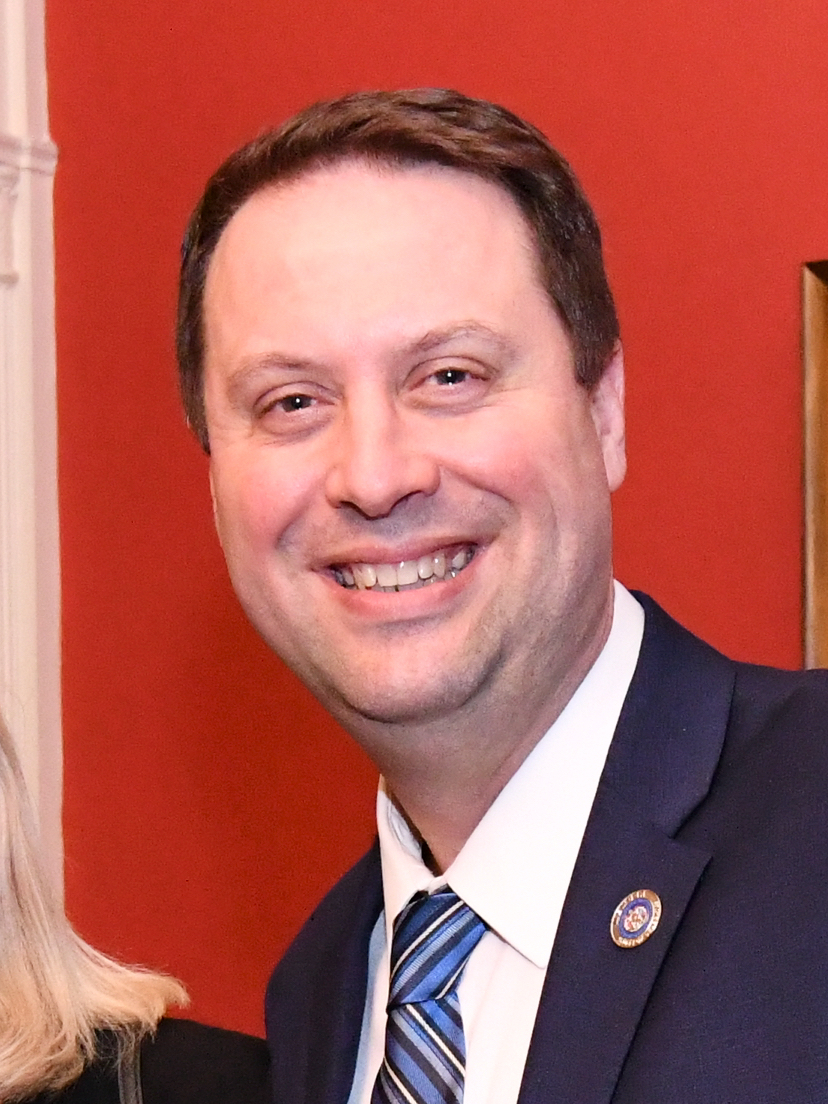
Gubernatorial nominees Wes Moore (left) and Dan Cox (right) had opposing views on the implementation of the Blueprint.

Support for the Blueprint continued to be a relevant topic in the 2022 Maryland gubernatorial election, as the next governor's willingness to support or block the Blueprint plan would have a significant impact on Maryland schools.

Most of the Democratic candidates for governor, including John King Jr., Wes Moore, and Tom Perez, made promises during their campaigns to support and provide funding for the Blueprint if they were elected governor. Comptroller Peter Franchot also said during his campaign that he would support the Blueprint as governor, but added that he had some skepticism toward the stability of Blueprint funding sources for the full decade. Franchot's opponents had accused him of flip-flopping on his support for the Blueprint, citing his opposition toward the proposal during legislative debates.

The Republican candidates in the race were less committal to supporting the Blueprint, with Kelly M. Schulz emphasizing support for school choice and charter schools during her campaign, and Dan Cox saying he would "remove critical race theory from public schools" if elected governor. Cox was a vocal critic of the Blueprint's implementation, voting against the reforms during the 2021 legislative session.

In April 2022, the Maryland State Education Association endorsed Moore's campaign, citing his support for the Blueprint reform effort. During his campaign, he promised to "work closely with local governments to make sure they are on board with their commitments to the Blueprint" and supported instituting universal preschool and increasing funding for school construction, teacher wages, and after-school programs.

Moore and Cox won the nomination of their parties following the primary election on July 19, 2022. Both nominees ran on opposing education platforms in the general election, with Moore emphasizing his support for the Blueprint and Cox highlighting his support for letting parents restrict school curriculum. Moore defeated Cox in the general election on November 8.

== Implementation ==
The Accountability and Implementation Board (AIB), which was established through 2020 Blueprint bill, began accepting applicants to ensure the implementation of the Kirwan Commission's reforms on July 9, 2021. Governor Hogan nominated seven members to the AIB on October 1, which met for the first time on November 16.

The AIB has struggled to meet the deadlines as proposed in the Blueprint law due to a lack of funding and staffing. In February 2022, the AIB approved a new timeline that pushed back select key dates for the Blueprint's implementation. Following this, the Maryland General Assembly voted in March 2022 to pass a bill to again delay the implementation of the Blueprint, aligning with the dates proposed in their timeline.

In December 2022, the AIB unanimously voted to adopt the $3.8 billion education plan. School systems had until March 15, 2023, to submit plans for fulfilling the Blueprint's funding requirements for the 2023-2024 school year. The AIB approved Blueprint implementation plans for all school districts by January 2025.

In January 2023, Governor Wes Moore released his first budget, which proposed reallocating $500 million toward the Blueprint. The budget was amended to increase funding for the Blueprint to $900 million in March 2023, and signed into law by Moore in April 2023.

=== 2025 legislative session ===
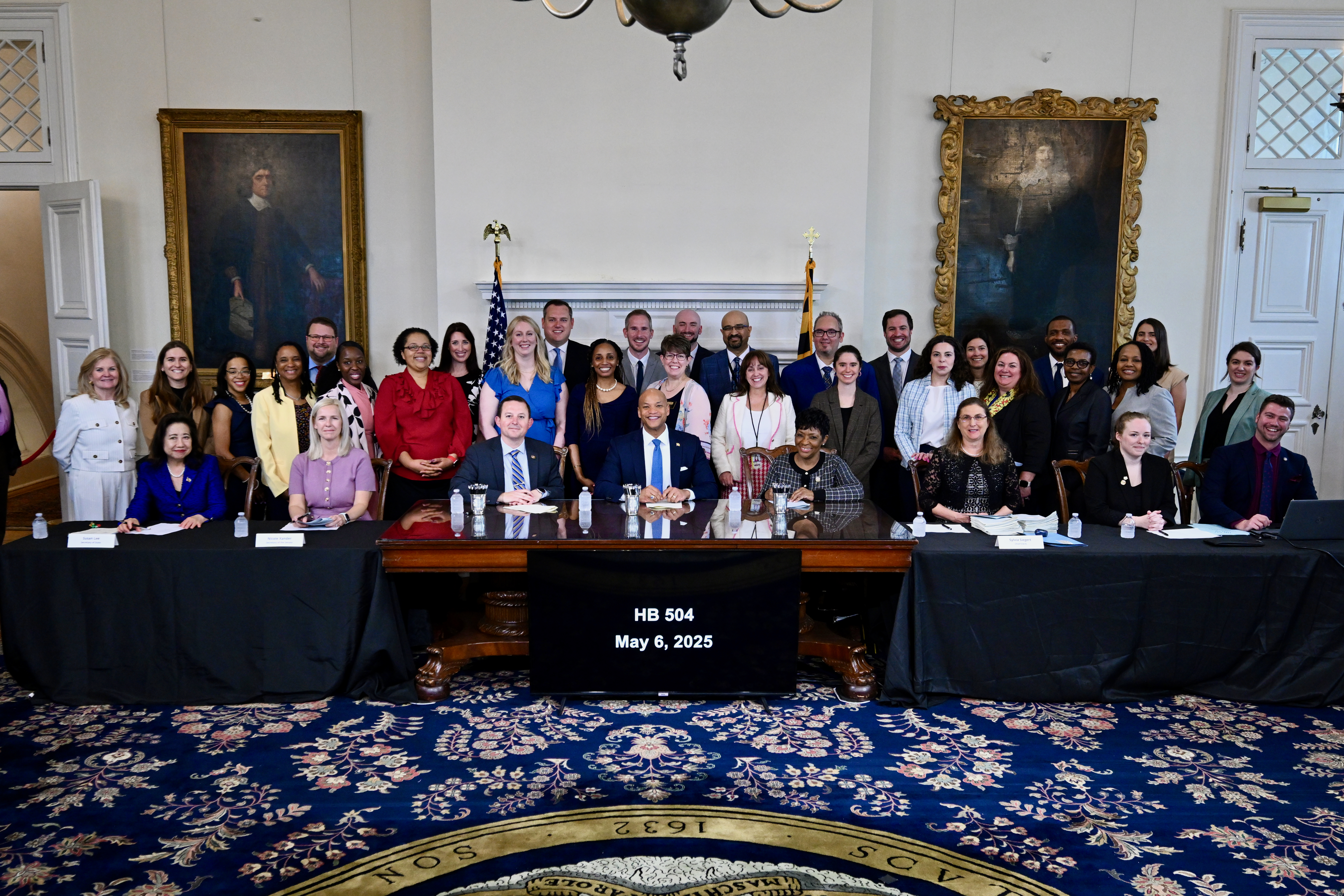
Governor Wes Moore signs the Excellence in Maryland Public Schools Act into law

In December 2024, after state financial officials determined that the state would face a $3 billion deficit during the 2026 fiscal year, Moore proposed scaling back parts of the Blueprint reform package and adjusting state formulas that determine how much funding state and local governments dedicate to education. At the same time, he said that he would keep intact policies to expand pre-kindergarten programs, tutoring, and early literacy programs, and suggested that the state should focus mainly on hiring and retaining teachers. During the 2025 legislative session, Moore introduced the Excellence in Maryland Public Schools Act, which proposed temporary pauses on plans under the Blueprint to gradually give teachers more "collaborative time" to work on professional development and planning outside of the classroom, reduce funding for programs to support students learning English, and freeze funding for community schools for two years.

Moore's proposals were opposed by Democratic lawmakers in the Maryland House of Delegates, members of the Maryland State Education Association and the American Federation of Teachers Maryland, and education advocates. The Accountability and Implementation Board unanimously voted to recommend revisiting the "collaborative time" implementation timeline and Maryland state superintendent Carey Wright testified in support of Moore's bill, but Moore himself did not testify in support of his bill. In March 2025, House lawmakers voted along party lines to reinstate many of Moore's proposed cuts to the Blueprint, while Democratic lawmakers in the Maryland Senate added extra funding for student mental health programs and set a four-year pause on the collaborative time program. Both the House and Senate versions passed their respective chambers, setting up a conference committee for further negotiations on the Blueprint reform bill; in April 2025, lawmakers agreed to a bill that would maintain funding for community schools, but implemented a three-year delay to policy requirements for collaborative time and an automatic freeze in annual funding increases if state revenue drops by roughly $1 billion. Moore signed the Excellence in Maryland Public Schools Act into law in May 2025.
