= Carroll County Times =

Newspaper in Maryland, US

- Type: Daily newspaper
- Format: Broadsheet
- Owner: David D. Smith under the Baltimore Sun Media Group
- Founded: 1911 (as The Times)
- Headquarters: 115 Airport Dr., Suite 170; Westminster, Maryland 21157; US
- ISSN: 0746-7494
- Website: www.baltimoresun.com/carroll-county-times

The Carroll County Times was founded on October 6, 1911, as The Times. Owner and publisher George Mather, whose father owned the once-prominent Mather's Department Store in Westminster, Maryland, sold The Times in 1947. The Times expanded and became the Carroll County Times in 1956.

The Carroll County Times changed hands several times over the next twenty years. It was a twice weekly paper when purchased by Landmark Community Newspapers, a subsidiary of Landmark Communications, in 1974. The paper began publishing five days a week in 1980. Not long after, in 1987, the Times began publishing seven days a week and added home delivery.

In addition to the Carroll County Times, Landmark Community Newspapers of Maryland produces a number of niche publications including The Community Times, The Advocate of Westminster and Finksburg, The Advocate of Eldersburg and Sykesville, Carroll Families, Carroll Seniors, Purchasing Power, and Homes Magazines serving Maryland, Virginia, West Virginia, and South Central Pennsylvania.

On January 3, 2008, it was reported that the family owned Landmark Communications, parent company of the Times, may be for sale. The Carroll County Times was acquired by The Baltimore Sun Media Group, and its parent company Tribune Publishing, in 2014.

Since 2024, Carroll County Times belongs to David D. Smith, the executive chairman of Sinclair Broadcast Group. Smith purchased the Baltimore Sun Media Group from Tribune Publishing and operates it separately from Sinclair.
