= Maryland Legislative District 5 =

American legislative district

Maryland's legislative district 5
- Represents parts of Carroll County and Frederick County
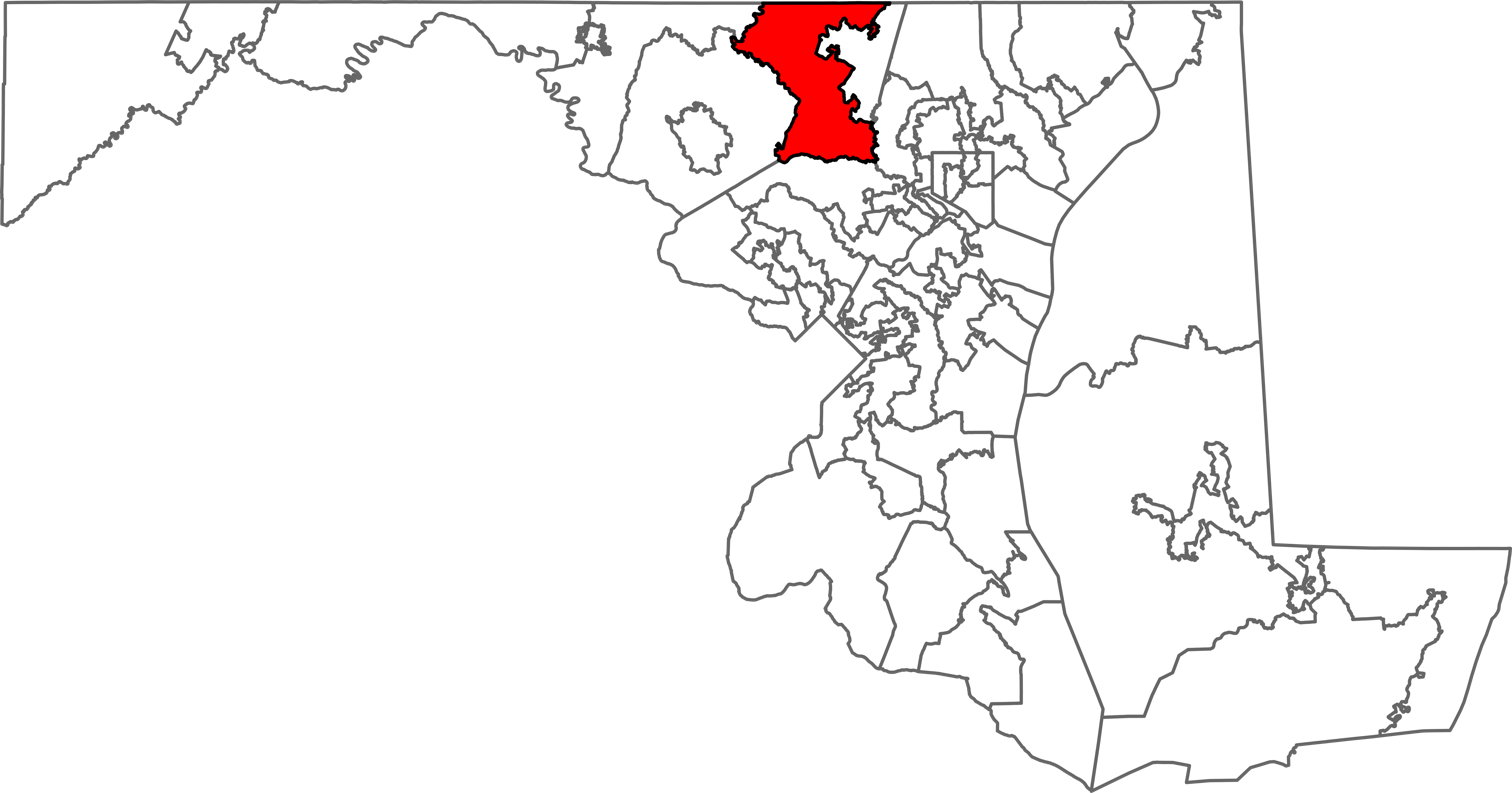
- Senator: Justin D. Ready (R)
- Delegate(s): April Rose (R); Christopher Eric Bouchat (R); Chris Tomlinson (R)
- Registration: 52.0% Republican; 26.3% Democratic; 20.2% unaffiliated
- Demographics: 86.6% White; 3.6% Black/African American; 0.2% Native American; 1.8% Asian; 0.0% Hawaiian/Pacific Islander; 1.7% Other race; 6.0% Two or more races; 4.3% Hispanic
- Population (2020): 131,865
- Voting-age population: 103,299
- Registered voters: 95,522

Maryland Legislative District 5 is one of 47 districts in the state for the Maryland General Assembly. It covers part of Carroll County, as well as a small part of southeastern Frederick County. Three delegates represent the district in the Maryland House of Delegates.

== Demographic characteristics ==
As of the 2020 United States census, the district had a population of 131,865, of whom 103,299 (78.3%) were of voting age. The racial makeup of the district was 114,178 (86.6%) White, 4,795 (3.6%) African American, 311 (0.2%) Native American, 2,432 (1.8%) Asian, 49 (0.0%) Pacific Islander, 2,232 (1.7%) from some other race, and 7,878 (6.0%) from two or more races. Hispanic or Latino of any race were 5,648 (4.3%) of the population.

The district had 95,522 registered voters as of October 17, 2020, of whom 19,265 (20.2%) were registered as unaffiliated, 49,658 (52.0%) were registered as Republicans, 25,112 (26.3%) were registered as Democrats, and 800 (0.8%) were registered to other parties.

== Political representation ==
The district is represented for the 2023–2027 legislative term in the State Senate by Justin D. Ready (R) and in the House of Delegates by April Rose (R), Christopher Eric Bouchat (R) and Chris Tomlinson (R).

== Election history ==
Years	Senator	Party	Electoral history
January 18, 1967 – January 3, 1975	Paul J. Bailey	Republican	Elected in 1966. Re-elected in 1970. Retired.
January 3, 1975 – January 10, 1979	C. A. Porter Hopkins	Republican	Elected in 1974. Retired.
January 10, 1979 – January 12, 1983	Francis X. Kelly	Democratic	Elected in 1978. Redistricted to the 10th district.
January 12, 1983 – October 15, 1989	Raymond E. Beck	Republican	Elected in 1982. Re-elected in 1986. Resigned to become a Carroll; County Circuit Court Judge.
December 18, 1989 – January 9, 1991	Sharon W. Hornberger	Republican	Appointed to finish Kelly's term. Lost renomination.
January 9, 1991 – January 12, 2011	Larry E. Haines	Republican	Elected in 1990. Re-elected in 1994. Re-elected in 1998. Re-elected in 2002. Re-elected in 2006. Retired.
January 12, 2011 – January 23, 2015	Joseph M. Getty	Republican	Elected in 2010. Re-elected in 2014. Resigned.
February 2, 2015 – present	Justin Ready	Republican	Appointed to finish Getty's term. Elected in 2018. Re-elected in 2022. Re-elected in 2026.
