= Barrie Ciliberti =

American politician (born 1936)

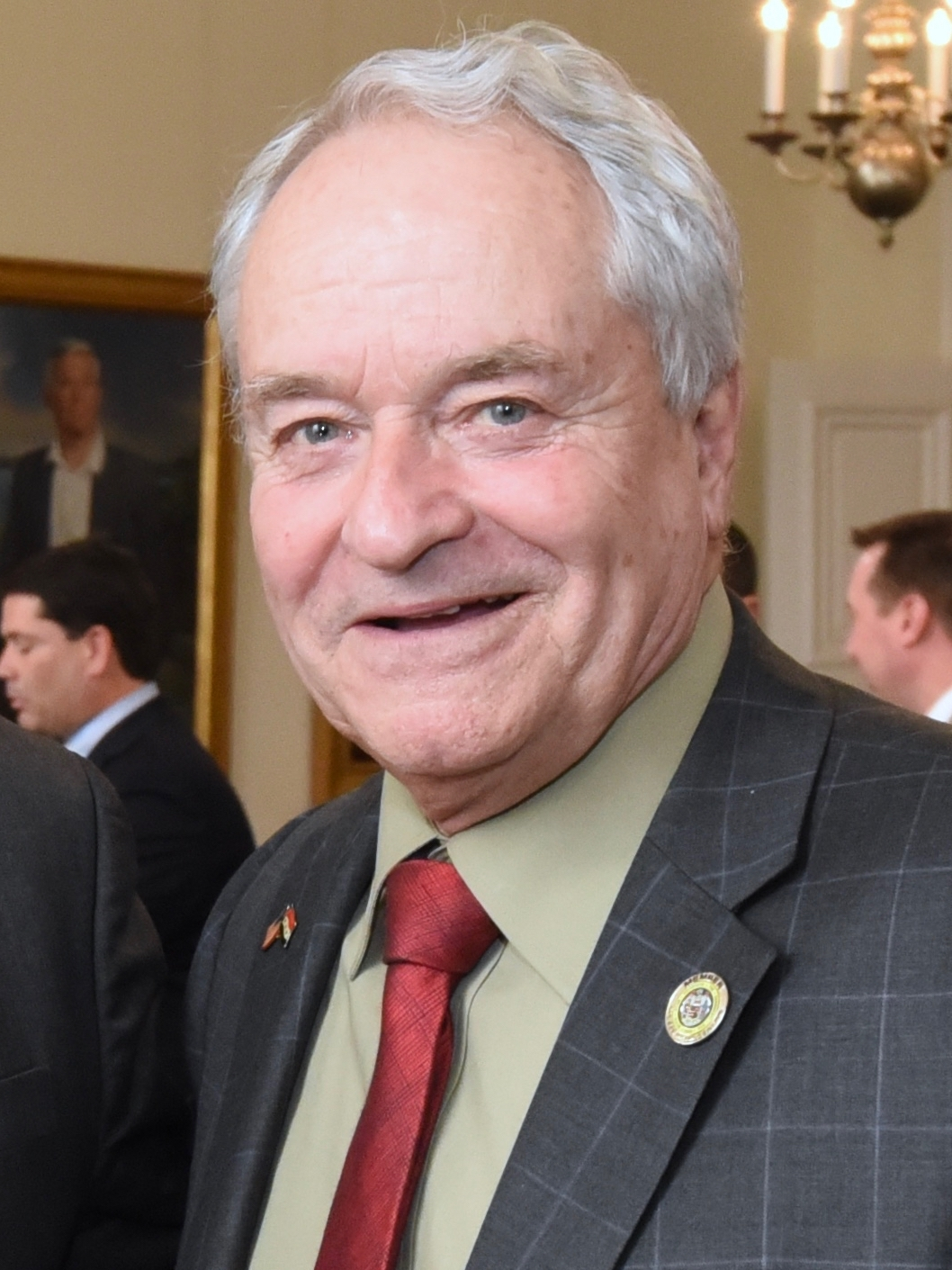
- Ciliberti in 2018

Member of the Maryland House of Delegates from the 4th district
- Incumbent
- Assumed office February 4, 2015 Serving with Jesse Pippy, Dan Cox, Kathy Afzali, and David E. Vogt III
- Preceded by: Kelly Schulz
- Constituency: Frederick County, Maryland and Carroll County, Maryland

Member of the Maryland House of Delegates from the 39th district
- In office January 11, 1995 – January 13, 1999 Serving with W. Raymond Beck and Mathew Mossburg
- Preceded by: Redistricting
- Succeeded by: Charles E. Barkley, Paul Carlson, & Joan F. Stern
- Constituency: Montgomery County, Maryland

Personal details
- Born: July 27, 1936 (age 90) Philadelphia, Pennsylvania, U.S.
- Party: Republican
- Spouse: Pam
- Children: 5
- Profession: Professor

Barrie Ciliberti (born July 27, 1936) is an American professor and politician. He is a professor at the University of Maryland University College and current Republican legislator in the Maryland House of Delegates, representing District 4. He previously represented District 39 in the House of Delegates from 1995 to 1999.

== Early life and education ==
Ciliberti was born in Philadelphia, Pennsylvania, where he graduated from Friends Select School. He later attended Ursinus College, where he earned a B.A. degree in history in 1957; Georgetown University, where he earned a M.A. degree in history in 1960; and Catholic University, where he earned a Ph.D. degree in administration in 1975.

Ciliberti is married to his wife, Pam, and has five adult children. Outside of politics, he enjoys mountain climbing and spending time with his children. His family moved from Rockville to Urbana in the early 2000s.

== Career ==
Since 1965, Ciliberti has worked as an associate professor of education at Bowie State University.

In 1985, Ciliberti was appointed by President Ronald Reagan to a member of the National Graduate Fellows Program Fellowship Board for a six-year term. President Reagan also appointed Dr Ciliberti to serve as a member of the National Advisory Council on Adult Education. He has served as a guest lecturer for the U.S. Information Agency and a special assistant for ethnic affairs with the Republican National Committee.

In 1994, Ciliberti was elected to the Maryland House of Delegates in District 39, riding the Gingrich wave to victory. He lost re-election to a second term in 1998, losing to Democrats Charles Barkley, Paul Carlson, and Joan F. Stern.

Ciliberti unsuccessfully ran for Congress in 1996, losing to incumbent U.S. Representative Connie Morella in the Republican primary election.

Dr. Ciliberti has served two civilian tours in Iraq working with the United States Department of State. On his first term, he worked with the United States Embassy in Baghdad on election security in advance of the historic elections in Iraq on January 30, 2005. Dr. Ciliberti's second tour was 255 miles north of Baghdad in the city of Mosul, Iraq where he served as the Senior Governance Advisor for Ninewah Province where he helped build the governance capacity of Provincial and city leaders throughout Ninewah Province.

In 2014, Ciliberti unsuccessfully ran for the Maryland House of Delegates in District 4, receiving 14.0 percent of the vote in the Republican primary.

In January 2015, the Frederick County Republican Central Committee recommended Ciliberti to replace Kelly Schulz in the Maryland House of Delegates after she was appointed to serve in Governor-elect Larry Hogan's cabinet as the Secretary of Labor. The Carroll County Republican Central Committee also voted to recommend Ciliberti, in addition to Jason Miller and Ken Timmerman, to fill the vacancy. Hogan appointed Ciliberti to the House of Delegates on February 3, 2015.

== In the legislature ==
Ciliberti was sworn into the Maryland House of Delegates to represent District 39 on January 11, 1995. During his legislative career in the Maryland General Assembly, he became known for his opposition to mandatory volunteerism and his stance against aggressive driving. He was a member of the Environmental Matters Committee.

Ciliberti was again sworn into the Maryland House of Delegates to represent District 4 on February 4, 2015 after paying campaign finance infractions for missing campaign finance reports. He was a member of the Appropriations Committee from 2015 to 2018, afterwards serving on the Environment and Transportation Committee until 2025. During the 2026 legislative session, Ciliberti was a member of the Government, Labor, and Elections Committee.

Ciliberti was an early and enthusiastic supporter of Donald Trump, even when many in the Maryland Republican Party were keeping their distance. In 2016, Ciliberti ran to be a delegate to the Republican National Convention, pledged to Trump. He won the Republican primary with 15.4 percent of the vote. He ran again as an alternate delegate pledged to Trump in 2020, receiving 32.8 percent of the vote in the Republican primary.

== Political positions ==
=== Abortion ===
Ciliberti supports the overturning of Roe v. Wade, saying that the issue of abortion should be left to the states.

During the 2015 legislative session, Ciliberti introduced legislation that would prohibit abortions past 20 weeks, excluding specific medical emergencies. The bill was re-introduced during the 2016 legislative session.

In September 2015, Ciliberti and state Senator Michael Hough wrote a letter to David Brinkley, the Maryland Secretary of Budget and Management, to push the state to eliminate funding for Planned Parenthood from the state's budget.

During the 2024 legislative session, Ciliberti introduced a bill that would require a 24-hour waiting period after a pregnant person receives a transabdominal ultrasound before a provider could perform an abortion.

=== Business ===
In July 2015, the Maryland Business for Responsible Government gave Ciliberti a score of 86 percent in its annual legislative scorecard.

=== COVID-19 pandemic ===
Ciliberti introduced legislation in the 2020 legislative session that would charge people who attack doctors or nurses with a sentence of up to 10 years in prison, a $5,000 fine, or both.

In April 2020, Ciliberti questioned the legality of the mask mandates implemented by an executive order issued by Governor Hogan, calling the mandates "draconian".

=== Education ===
In April 2019, Ciliberti voted against the Blueprint for Maryland's Future. He was the only member of the Frederick County delegation to do so.

=== Environment ===
In July 2015, the Maryland Business for Responsible Government gave Ciliberti a score of 50 percent in its annual legislative scorecard.

In April 2021, Ciliberti joined Democrats in the House Environment and Transportation Committee in voting in favor of the Climate Solutions Now Act of 2021.

=== Guns ===
In March 2018, Ciliberti voted against a bill that would ban bump stocks, which passed the Maryland House of Delegates by a vote of 128-7. He was the only member of the Frederick County delegation to vote against the bill.

=== National politics ===
In December 2019, Ciliberti called the first impeachment of Donald Trump an "attempted coup d'etat".

== Election results ==
Maryland House of Delegates District 39 Republican Primary Election, 1994
Party	Name	Votes	Percent
Republican	Mathew Mossburg	2,967	24%
Republican	W. Raymond Beck	2,475	20%
Republican	Barrie S. Ciliberti	2,450	19%
Republican	Peter James	1,520	12%
Republican	Dana S. Rawlings	1,320	11%

Maryland House of Delegates District 39 General Election, 1994
Party	Name	Votes	Percent
Republican	Mathew Mossburg	13,119	17%
Republican	W. Raymond Beck	12,311	16%
Republican	Barrie S. Ciliberti	12,897	16%
Democratic	Charles E. Barkley	12,137	15%
Democratic	Anise Key Brown	10,987	14%
Democratic	Anthony J. Santangelo	10,939	14%
Independent	Patricia Cummings	6,471	8%

Republican primary, Congress, Maryland 8th district, 1996
Party	Name	Votes	Percent
Republican	Constance A. Morella	28,818	65%
Republican	Barrie S. Ciliberti	11,845	27%
Republican	John C. Webb Jr.	2,770	6%
Republican	Luis F. Columba	698	2%

Maryland House of Delegates District 39 Republican Primary Election, 1998
Party	Name	Votes	Percent
Republican	Barrie S. Ciliberti	2,872	23%
Republican	Walter McKee	2,722	22%
Republican	Mathew Mossburg	2,496	20%
Republican	Patricia Cummings	2,183	18%
Republican	Robert J. Smith	2,182	18%

Maryland House of Delegates District 39 General Election, 1998
Party	Name	Votes	Percent
Democratic	Charles E. Barkley	17,020	18%
Democratic	Paul Carlson	16,670	18%
Democratic	Joan F. Stern	16,515	18%
Republican	Barrie S. Ciliberti	14,420	16%
Republican	Walter McKee	14,412	16%
Republican	Mathew Mossburg	13,439	15%

Maryland House of Delegates District 4 Republican Primary Election, 2014
Party	Name	Votes	Percent
Republican	Kathy Afzali	9,440	27.4%
Republican	Kelly Schulz	8,274	24.0%
Republican	David E. Vogt III	6,499	18.9%
Republican	Wendi W. Peters	5,417	15.7%
Republican	Barrie S. Ciliberti	4,816	14.0%

Delegates to the Republican National Convention, District 6, 2016
Party	Candidate	Votes	%
Republican	Wendell Beitzel (Trump)	31,647	17.2%
Republican	Joeylynn Hough (Trump)	29,402	15.9%
Republican	Barrie S. Ciliberti (Trump)	28,365	15.4%
Republican	Neil Parrott (Cruz)	15,439	8.4%
Republican	Michael Hough (Cruz)	14,809	8.0%
Republican	Brett Wilson (Cruz)	13,878	7.5%
Republican	Jake Shade (Kasich)	13,036	7.1%
Republican	Jason C. Buckel (Rubio)	3,291	1.8%
Republican	William Joseph Wivell (Carson)	3,112	1.7%
Republican	Dave Caporale (Rubio)	3,018	1.6%
Republican	Mike McKay	2,832	1.5%
Republican	Erich Bean (Rubio)	2,319	1.3%
Republican	Laura Gabrielle Lightstone (Carson)	2,197	1.2%
Republican	Doro Bush Koch (Bush)	1,999	1.1%
Republican	Henry M. Ramirez (Bush)	1,712	0.9%
Republican	Marc A. Antonetti (Fiorina)	1,320	0.7%
Republican	Ignacio E. Sanchez (Bush)	1,169	0.6%
Republican	Ruth Marie Umbel (Christie)	1,131	0.6%
Republican	Daniel F. C. Crowley	997	0.5%
Republican	Robert Mitchell Wolfe (Fiorina)	981	0.5%
Republican	Kimberly Euler	786	0.4%
Republican	Cynthia Houser	771	0.4%
Republican	Billy Shreve	766	0.4%
Republican	Linda Lee Seibert	642	0.3%
Republican	Sandra Marie Myers	623	0.3%
Republican	Billy Shreve	766	0.4%
Republican	Scott L. Wolff	600	0.3%
Republican	Robert Schaefer	570	0.3%
Republican	Josephine J. Wang (Christie)	551	0.3%
Republican	Patricia A. Reilly	549	0.3%
Republican	Ryan Richard Miner	471	0.3%
Republican	Laura Patallo Sanchez	378	0.2%
Republican	Donna Buser Wallizer	357	0.2%
Republican	Therese Marie Shaheen	346	0.2%
Republican	Darren Wigfield	336	0.2%
Republican	Lawrence T. Di Rita	287	0.2%
Republican	Monica L. Stallworth	247	0.1%
Republican	Eric Salzano	168	0.1%
Republican	William S. Richbourg	135	0.1%

Maryland House of Delegates District 4 Republican Primary Election, 2018
Party	Name	Votes	Percent
Republican	Dan Cox	7,728	35.5%
Republican	Jesse T. Pippy	7,052	32.4%
Republican	Barrie S. Ciliberti	7,018	32.2%

Maryland House of Delegates District 4 General Election, 2018
Party	Name	Votes	Percent
Republican	Dan Cox	33,303	20.6%
Republican	Barrie S. Ciliberti	31,817	19.7%
Republican	Jesse T. Pippy	31,071	19.2%
Democratic	Lois Jarman	22,807	14.1%
Democratic	Ysela Bravo	21,901	13.6%
Democratic	Lois Jarman	20,462	12.7%
N/A	Other Write-Ins	92	0.1%

Alternate Delegates to the Republican National Convention, District 6, 2020
Party	Candidate	Votes	%
Republican	Jerry DeWolf (Trump)	31,647	33.7%
Republican	Luanne Ruddell (Trump)	29,402	33.5%
Republican	Barrie S. Ciliberti (Trump)	33,573	32.8%
