= Kelly M. Schulz =

American politician

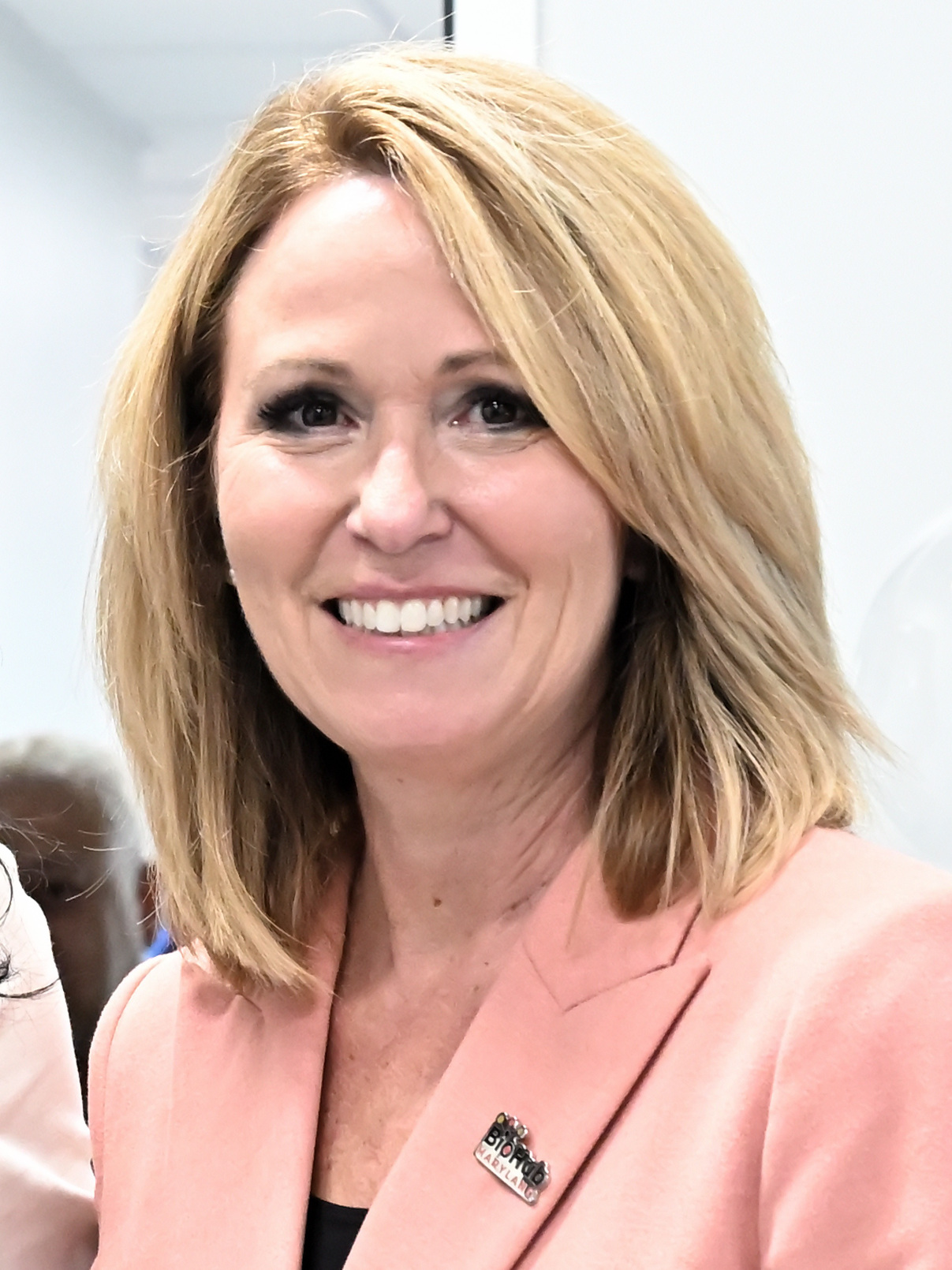

Secretary of the Maryland Department of Commerce
- In office January 9, 2019 – January 10, 2022
- Governor: Larry Hogan
- Preceded by: Mike Gill
- Succeeded by: Mike Gill

Secretary of the Maryland Department of Labor, Licensing, and Regulation
- In office March 13, 2015 – January 9, 2019
- Governor: Larry Hogan
- Preceded by: Leonard Howie
- Succeeded by: James E. Rzepkowski

Member of the Maryland House of Delegates from the 4A district
- In office January 12, 2011 – March 13, 2015 Serving with Kathy Afzali
- Preceded by: Paul S. Stull; Joseph R. Bartlett
- Succeeded by: Barrie Ciliberti

Personal details
- Born: January 2, 1969 (age 57) Warren, Michigan, U.S.
- Party: Republican
- Spouse: John Nowell
- Children: 2
- Education: Monroe Community College (AA); Hood College (BA)

Kelly M. Schulz (born January 2, 1969) is an American politician who served as secretary of the Maryland Department of Commerce from January 2019 to January 2022 and earlier as Secretary of the Maryland Department of Labor, Licensing, and Regulation. She served in the Maryland House of Delegates, representing District 4A, Frederick County, Maryland. She ran unsuccessfully for the Republican nomination for Governor of Maryland in 2022, losing to state delegate Dan Cox.

== Early life and education ==
Schulz was born on January 2, 1969, in Warren, Michigan. She attended college, but left at age 19 when she became pregnant. She married, had another child, and worked a series of jobs, including bartending and waiting tables. She later returned to college, attending Monroe Community College in Rochester, New York, and earning an A.A. degree in 2003. In the same year, she moved to Frederick County for her husband's job. She completed her undergraduate studies at Hood College, earning a B.A. in political science in 2006.

== Career ==
Schulz is a former aide to the Maryland House Republican Caucus. Her service to the Maryland Republican Party was recognized with the Grass Roots Activist Award in 2005 and she represented Maryland at the Republican National Convention in 2008.

=== In the legislature ===
Schulz won a seat in the two-member District 4A in Frederick County by finishing first in a field of five candidates in the 2010 Maryland House of Delegates election. In the primary election Schulz finished second, edging out incumbent Delegate Paul S. Stull by six votes. Schulz was sworn in on January 12, 2011, and was assigned to the House Economic Matters committee. She was a member of the Women Legislators of Maryland.

In 2012, Schulz filed to run as a Delegate to the Republican National Convention, representing Rick Perry. She received 2.1 percent of the vote in the Republican primary election.

=== Executive branch ===
On December 17, 2014, Governor-Elect Larry Hogan announced at a press conference that he had chosen Schulz to be his Secretary for the Department of Labor, Licensing, and Regulation. The Maryland Senate unanimously approved her nomination on February 13, 2015. She was sworn in on March 13, 2015.

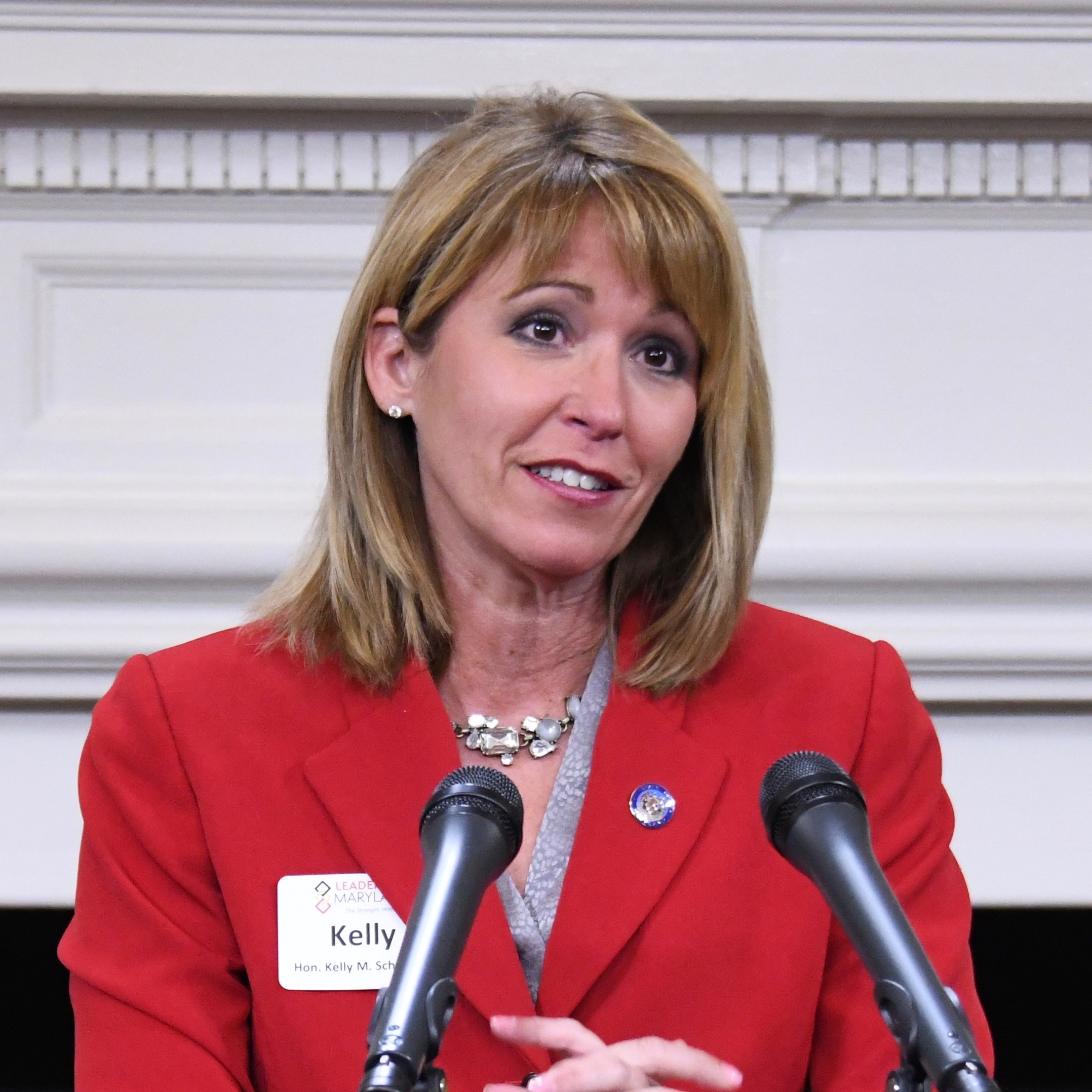
Schulz as Maryland Secretary of Labor

As Secretary of Labor, Schulz sought to improve Maryland's image among businesses and piloted apprenticeship programs to prepare youth for STEM careers. Labor unions expressed concern with Schulz's policies, including those concerning off-the-books hiring.

On December 17, 2018, Hogan announced that Schulz would succeed Mike Gill as Maryland Secretary of Commerce. Her nomination was unanimously approved by the Maryland Senate on February 8, 2019. She was sworn in on January 9, 2019.

During her tenure at the Department of Commerce, the agency played a role in keeping businesses operating during the COVID-19 pandemic. Following the pandemic, Schulz sought to promote business through a state marketing effort called "Innovation Uncovered".

On December 30, 2021, the Hogan administration announced that Schulz would leave the administration alongside Maryland Transportation Secretary Greg Slater in order to focus on her gubernatorial campaign. Hogan named Mike Gill, her predecessor, to succeed Schulz as Secretary of Commerce effective January 11, 2022.

=== 2022 Maryland gubernatorial candidacy ===
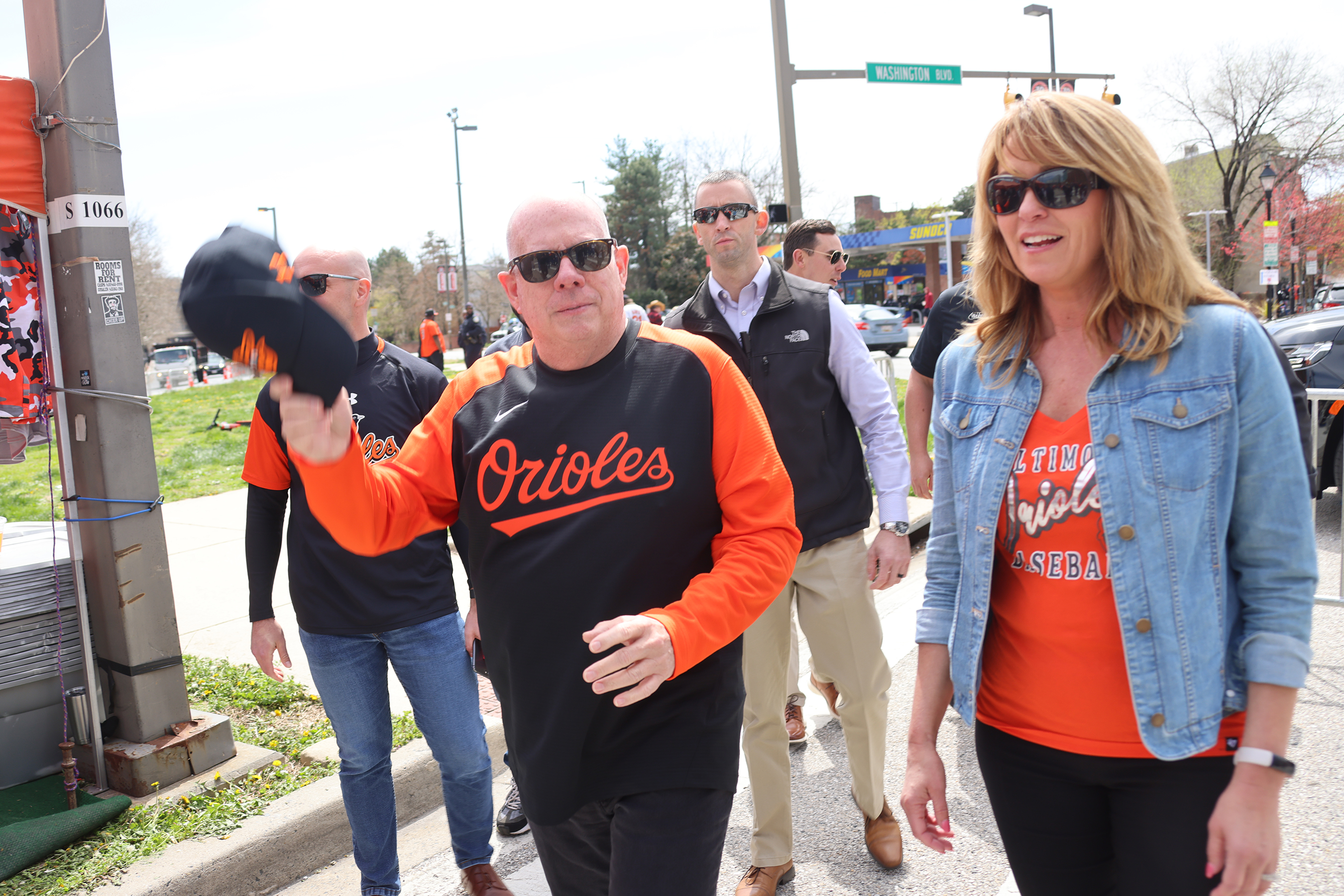
Schulz (right) campaigning with Governor Larry Hogan (center), 2022

On April 14, 2021, Schulz announced that she would vie to become the state's first female governor by running to be the Republican nominee in the 2022 Maryland gubernatorial election. Her running mate was Jeff Woolford, an Air Force veteran and assistant Health secretary. She was endorsed by Hogan, who was stepping down as required by Maryland term limits.

During the primary, Schulz was noted for withdrawing from many of the candidate forums held around the state, refusing to take a stage with her main opponent Dan Cox. The Schulz campaign said this was to avoid propping up Cox, who was farther to the right than the more moderate Schulz. Cox had been endorsed by former president Donald Trump, who had criticized Governor Hogan and attacked Schulz as a RINO. The primary between Cox and Schulz was seen by election analysts as a proxy war between Hogan and Trump. The Democratic Governors Association (DGA) spent $1 million on television ads promoting Cox, believing him to be a weaker opponent in a deep blue state.

Schulz's performance by county in the 2022 gubernatorial Republican primary Map legend: Schulz—10–20%; Schulz—20–30%; Schulz—30–40%; Schulz—40–50%; Schulz—50–60%

On July 19, 2022, Schulz lost the primary to Cox, earning 43.5 percent of the vote to Cox's 52.0 percent. Schulz declined to endorse Cox after conceding on July 29, predicting correctly that Democratic nominee Wes Moore would defeat him in the general election.

Jim Dornan, who worked as an on-and-off political strategist for the Schulz campaign, attributed Cox's primary victory to Trump's endorsement and the DGA ad blitz. Other observers, including former Maryland lieutenant governor and Republican National Committee chair Michael Steele, said the ads had little impact on voters. Steele noted that neo-Confederate activist Michael Peroutka won his primary to be the GOP's candidate for Maryland Attorney General by an almost identical margin to Cox without DGA ads.

== Post-secretary career ==
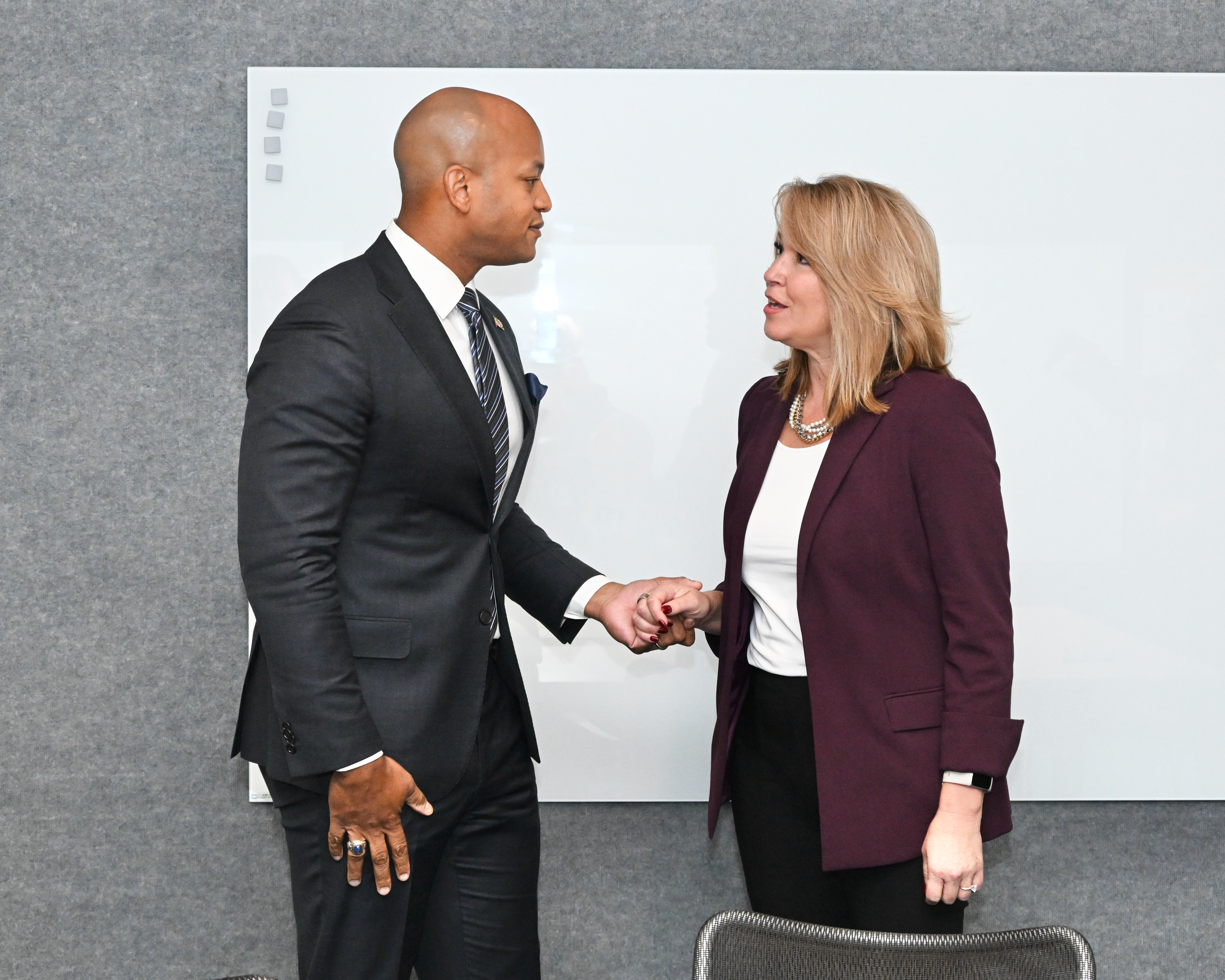
Schulz shakes hands with Governor Wes Moore, 2023

In October 2022, the Maryland Tech Council announced that Schulz would serve as the trade association's CEO, beginning on November 1. In February 2023, Schulz was named as a member of the Hood College Board of Associates.

== Political positions ==
=== Education ===
During her 2022 campaign, Schulz said that she supported school choice and advocated for keeping schools open. She also drafted a "parental bill of rights" that included promises to post classroom lessons online, expand the use of school resource officers in classrooms, make it easier to open public charter schools, increase funding for private school scholarships, and "keep partisan politics out of the classroom".

=== Elections ===
In August 2013, Schulz called for an investigation into the integrity of Maryland's elections in the state after conservative activist group True the Vote claimed to find 173 cases of interstate voter fraud in Florida.

Schulz introduced legislation in the 2014 legislative session that would allow mail voting for municipal incorporation elections.

=== Guns ===
Schulz introduced several pieces of gun-rights legislation during the 2015 legislative session before she resigned to join the Hogan administration. The first bill would have allowed licensed gun shops to instigate a National Instant Criminal Background Check and sell firearms to a person upon passing the background check. The second bill would have allowed owners of assault weapons to repair broken parts of a firearm that is registered with the Maryland State Police. The third would have changed Maryland from a may-issue to a shall-issue state. The fourth and final bill would have repealed a law that requires shell casings to be sent to the Department of State Police Crime Laboratory, which maintains a database of discharged casings to track guns that may be used in crimes.

=== Immigration ===
In January 2011, Schulz said she opposed legislation that would provide financial aid to illegal immigrants. She also said she thought the state should prevent illegal immigrants from receiving welfare benefits or social services.

Schulz opposed legislation introduced in the 2013 legislative session that would allow undocumented workers to obtain limited driver's licenses.

=== Labor ===
In 2012, Schulz worked to weaken the Workplace Fraud Act, which gave employers twice as much time to produce records and added exemptions for employers.

In December 2013, Schulz wrote an op-ed for the Frederick News-Post criticizing legislation that would raise the state's minimum wage from $7.25 to $10 per hour. She voted against the bill in the House Economic Matters Committee, which passed it, 13–8. Schulz did remove a provision from the bill that would have indexed increases of the minimum wage to inflation.

In 2017, Governor Hogan appointed Schulz to chair a committee to investigate paid-leave policy. In November, the group released a 72-page report containing its conclusions on the implementation of statewide paid-leave legislation.

In February 2019, Schulz wrote to lawmakers to urge them to consider implementing regional or county wage rates into legislation that would increase the state's minimum wage to $15 an hour.

=== Marijuana ===
During a debate on legislation that would legalize medical marijuana in Maryland, Schulz introduced an amendment that would report medical marijuana use on the state's prescription drug monitoring program. The House of Delegates rejected the amendment.

In August 2021, Schulz said that she did not have a policy position on the legalization of marijuana, but mentioned that hemp development for farmers was an important economic development opportunity.

=== Social issues ===
As a state delegate, Schulz sponsored and voted for bills that would have restricted abortion rights in Maryland, including a bill to block state funding for abortion services and proposed ballot referendum to amend the state constitution to extend the state's constitutional rights to people "from the beginning of their biological development". During her gubernatorial campaign, Schulz said that she personally opposes abortion but would not move to change current Maryland law.

In January 2012, Schulz said that she opposed same-sex marriage and supported a grassroots movement to start a referendum to overturn same-sex marriage legislation. She voted against legislation introduced in the 2012 legislative session that would legalize same-sex marriage in Maryland.

Schulz opposes mask and vaccine mandates, saying that both should be up to the individual.

== Electoral history ==
Alternate Delegates to the Republican National Convention, District 6, 2008
Party	Candidate	Votes	%
Republican	John Moulton (McCain)	26,404	14.4
Republican	Kelly Schulz (McCain)	24,608	13.4
Republican	Patricia Moulton (McCain)	24,117	13.2
Republican	Jeffery Bailey, Jr. (Huckabee)	21,036	11.5
Republican	S. Chris Anders (Huckabee)	20,348	11.1
Republican	Megan Ritter (Huckabee)	18,727	10.2
Republican	Robert McKee (Romney)	7,932	4.3
Republican	Dino Flores, Jr. (Romney)	6,824	3.7
Republican	John Dunlap (Romney)	6,471	3.5
Republican	Paul Andrew Buede (Paul)	4,487	2.4
Republican	Linda Parker (Paul)	4,438	2.4
Republican	Tiffane Coe (Paul)	4,153	2.3
Republican	Brandon Butler (Thompson)	3,120	1.7
Republican	April Rose (Thompson)	2,368	1.3
Republican	Joseph Edlow (Giuliani)	1,848	1.0
Republican	Teresa E. Reilly (Giuliani)	1,838	1.0
Republican	Katie Nash	1,762	1.0
Republican	James Richardson (Giuliani)	1,711	0.9
Republican	Robert Small	1,045	0.6

Maryland House of Delegates District 4A Republican Primary Election, 2010
Party	Candidate	Votes	%
Republican	Kathy Afzali	3,454	22.5
Republican	Kelly Schulz	3,399	22.1
Republican	Paul S. Stull	3,393	22.1
Republican	Dino Flores, Jr.	2,759	18.0
Republican	John "Lennie" Thompson, Jr.	2,354	15.3

Maryland House of Delegates District 4A Election, 2010
Party	Candidate	Votes	%
Republican	Kelly Schulz	16,952	32.2
Republican	Kathy Afzali	16,683	31.7
Democratic	Ryan Trout	9,678	18.4
Democratic	Bonita Riffle Currey	6,993	13.3
Independent	Scott Guenthner	2,150	4.1
Write-in		162	0.3

Delegates to the Republican National Convention, District 8, 2012
Party	Candidate	Votes	%
Republican	Kathy Afzali (Romney)	17,386	19.1
Republican	Howard Allen Denis (Romney)	15,797	17.4
Republican	Mark Uncapher (Romney)	14,337	15.8
Republican	John Kautter, II (Santorum)	7,980	8.8
Republican	Bud Nason (Santorum)	7,821	8.6
Republican	Patricia Fenati (Gingrich)	3,927	4.3
Republican	Gus Alzona (Paul)	3,884	4.3
Republican	Matthew Sylvester Helminiak (Gingrich)	3,702	4.1
Republican	Michael Hargadon (Paul)	3,473	3.8
Republican	Samuel Fenati (Gingrich)	3,319	3.6
Republican	Harold Owen (Paul)	3,173	3.5
Republican	Kelly Schulz (Perry)	1,925	2.1
Republican	Byron Anderson	1,718	1.9
Republican	Mary Theresa Barbuto	1,483	1.6
Republican	Justin Ready (Perry)	1,061	1.2

Maryland House of Delegates District 4 Republican Primary Election, 2014
Party	Candidate	Votes	%
Republican	Kathy Afzali	9,440	27.4
Republican	Kelly Schulz	8,274	24.0
Republican	David E. Vogt III	6,499	18.9
Republican	Wendi Peters	5,417	15.7
Republican	Barrie Ciliberti	4,816	14.0

Maryland House of Delegates District 4 Election, 2014
Party	Candidate	Votes	%
Republican	Kelly Schulz	33,753	31.0
Republican	Kathy Afzali	31,128	28.5
Republican	David Vogt III	27,313	25.1
Democratic	Gene Stanton	16,493	15.1
Write-in		346	0.3

Maryland gubernatorial Republican primary, 2022
Party	Candidate	Votes	%
Republican	Dan Cox; Gordana Schifanelli	153,423	52.0
Republican	Kelly Schulz; Jeff Woolford	128,302	43.5
Republican	Robin Ficker; LeRoy F. Yegge Jr.	8,268	2.8
Republican	Joe Werner; Minh Thanh Luong	5,075	1.7
