= Andrew J. Duck =

United States Army officer

Andrew Duck

Personal details
- Born: October 31, 1962 (age 64)
- Party: Democratic
- Alma mater: University of Oklahoma, Texas State University
- Occupation: Stockbroker, Intelligence Analyst
- Website: http://www.duckforcongress.org

Military service
- Branch/service: United States Army
- Rank: Captain
- Battles/wars: Bosnian War, Operation Iraqi Freedom

Andrew J. Duck (born October 31, 1962) is an American politician and a perennial candidate. He was most recently the Democratic candidate for the United States House of Representatives for Maryland's 6th congressional district in the 2010 general election. He was a candidate for the same seat in 2006, 2008, and 2010, winning the Democratic nomination in 2006 but losing in the 2008 Democratic primary to Jennifer Dougherty. On June 1, 2009, he announced his intention to run for the seat again in 2010. Duck defeated Casey Clark in the Democratic primary but lost the general election to incumbent Roscoe Bartlett.

== Biography ==
Duck is the 15th of 17 children. He is a graduate of Middletown High School in Middletown, Maryland, in 1979 and earned a bachelor's degree in public administration from Southwest Texas State University. He married Whitney Duck in 1981, and the couple has three children.

=== Military career ===
Duck became a member of the U.S. Army, beginning as a private first class, working as a company clerk. He worked his way up to administrative non-commissioned officer, was trained as a Korean linguist, and was commissioned as a Military Intelligence officer.

Duck's military assignments include commander of D Company in the 103rd Military Intelligence Battalion, leading the Joint STARS Platoon and working with the 103rd Military Intelligence Battalion in Bosnia. He was also an intelligence liaison officer to the 1st Marine Expeditionary Force in Iraq, and an intelligence staff officer with the Coalition Forces Land Component Command in Kuwait.

=== Private career ===
Duck has also worked as a stockbroker for Merrill Lynch in Frederick, Maryland. He is currently the Director of Operations at Avertica. He is now retired from Northrop Grumman where he served as an advisor to The Pentagon on Army Intelligence issues.

== Political career ==
Duck was a staff member on the 1980 Carter/Mondale Presidential Committee. Most recently, he has become a member of Citizens for Responsible Growth in New Market, Maryland, and co-founder of Frederick for Kerry in 2004, which promoted the presidential campaign of John Kerry in Frederick, Maryland.

=== 2006 campaign ===
In his 2006 campaign against long-serving Republican Representative Roscoe Bartlett, Duck was widely perceived as a longshot. He enjoyed some partisan support as evidenced by the endorsements by several statewide and regional Democrats, including Senator Barbara Mikulski, Congressman Chris Van Hollen, and two former mayors of Frederick, Ron Young and Jennifer Dougherty. He also received support from several organized labor groups, including the Maryland-D.C. AFL-CIO, the Maryland State Teacher's Association and the National Education Association.

Duck claimed to support "restoring fiscal responsibility to Washington" by eliminating "the culture of corruption and fraud, (reexamining) current spending to match current priorities, and (rolling) back the tax cut for the top two percent of Americans". His infrastructure platform called for ensuring that Maryland can "support water, sewer, transportation and education" while preserving "open spaces... rural heritage (and) affordable housing". On education, he supports increased funding and claims that the No Child Left Behind Act has been a failure due to underfunding and a lack of flexibility. He was an advocate of gun ownership restrictions and sought to reduce gun violence by closing the gun show loophole, providing universal health care, including mental health care, and promoting the registration of weapons and a law enforcement focus on violent criminals and anti-gang initiatives. He supported energy independence, believing it can be achieved in 10 years; his proposals included "re-engineering federal buildings to reduce government energy consumption", raising Corporate Average Fuel Economy standards, increasing funding for mass transit, requiring disclosure of home energy costs and offering tax "incentives for energy conservation and (the) use of mass transit." He opposed partially privatizing Social Security. He also advocated federal legislation to change bankruptcy protection so that individuals' retirement is "safe and secure". He supported universal health care and environmental protection, which he claimed was rolled back by the George W. Bush Administration. Specifically, on the environment, he supported the Clean Air Act and Clean Water Act and opposed drilling in the Arctic National Wildlife Refuge; he believed that the Healthy Forests Initiative and the Clear Skies Act have a negative impact on the environment. Though his website does not cover the issue, Duck has been described as supporting civil unions as the first step towards marriages equality, and supports equal rights for the LGBTQ community.

Duck's website did not cover his position on abortion. However, he has been described personally pro-life, but believes the choice is ultimately up the women who is carrying the child to make that decision. As a veteran of the Iraq War, he claimed to be proud of his service in that country and felt that the war effort has been bungled. He believed that American forces "continue to do an outstanding job" in physical battles. However, he claimed, their efforts will be in vain if new enemies replace old ones due to Iraqi opposition to and dissatisfaction with the American occupation. He referred to this struggle as a "Battle of Ideas". His personal "roadmap to victory" in Iraq included providing adequate resources for the troops in that country, both in the number of soldiers and their equipment, training Iraqi forces, and recruiting additional allies from Europe. He was opposed to a timetable for exit from Iraq. Duck believed the United States can win the "Battle of Ideas" in Iraq by internationalizing the war effort with increasing support from European allies, investigating and prosecuting all guilty parties in detainee abuse incidents such as at Abu Ghraib, evaluating actions "to determine the impact on insurgent recruiting," and closing Guantanamo Bay and prosecuting any terrorists held there in federal courts, and holding wartime combatants in the countries they fought. His long-term goals in the Muslim world included promoting "public engagement" between American and Muslim leaders, democracy "in whatever form is acceptable to (Muslims)," Fair Trade and economic development, and literacy "throughout the Middle East." He also considered his plan for energy independence within 10 years to be a part of his Middle East strategy. Duck pointed to one event as a major reason for his criticism of the Bush administration's war strategy, the canceling of elections in an-Najaf on orders from the administration, because, he noted, "they didn't want to accept the results of the election".

Duck's campaign focused on his military service, especially after he began working with the Band of Brothers, an organization of veterans and Democratic candidates. He used military metaphors to enforce this image, which he counts as a "key weapon" in his campaign against Bartlett. Independent observers claimed that his military experience would help in the election by countering the argument that Democrats are "soft on terrorism"; however, this was not a large enough aid in the election. Bartlett won his 2004 re-election campaign, which was also against a veteran, with 68% of the vote. However, Duck hoped that he would win the votes of Republicans and independents unhappy with the Bush Administration's deficient war spending and that this would be enough to bring him victory in the election. He pointed to conservative dissatisfaction with Republican leadership, which has created "the biggest government we've ever had, the most intrusive government we've ever had and the most fiscally irresponsible government that we've ever had".

Duck and Bartlett held very similar views on many topics, including their support of energy independence and opposition to drilling in the Arctic National Wildlife Refuge. Duck, however, criticized his opponent on at least one specific issue, a vote "against providing sufficient funds for veterans' medical care".

Duck's campaign funding totaled a little bit over $100,000, of which more than $75,000 has come from individuals, $15,000 from PACs and under $10,000 from the candidate's own funds. His PAC funding, according to The Washington Post, fell entirely into the "ideology/single issue section," while his individual contributions came primarily from the "Lawyers/Lobbyists" and "Other" categories. His top five contributors, each of which have donated more than $500 to his campaign, were the Iraq and Afghanistan Veterans of America, Retail Services & Systems, Universal Title, Glenwillow Inc., and Global Crossing. He received most of his contributions from people in Westminster, Frederick, Potomac, Baltimore and Ijamsville. All of his contributions were from in-state sources, and the majority were from industries classified as "Lawyers/Law Firms," "Retired," "Misc. Issues," and "Real Estate". OpenSecrets.org describes Duck's biggest sources of funding as including "Industrial Unions", "Lawyers/Law Firms", "Retired", "Misc Issues", "Leadership PACs" and "Real Estate", and describes more of his funding as coming from "Labor" rather than "Ideological' sources.

The Washington Times stated that Maryland's 6th district is the state's most reliably Republican and that Duck was not regarded as a serious threat to the incumbent.

Duck lost the election to Bartlett on November 7, 2006. He received 39% of the vote, while Bartlett received 59%.

=== 2008 campaign ===
Duck announced that he would challenge Congressman Bartlett again in 2008.

Duck was defeated in the Potomac Primary on February 12, 2008, by former Frederick mayor Jennifer Dougherty with 44% to Duck's 37%, the remaining votes split between three other candidates. Dougherty went on to lose in the general election to incumbent Republican Roscoe Bartlett.

=== 2010 campaign ===
Duck challenged Congressman Bartlett in the 2010 election. He defeated former TV newsman Casey Clark, in the Democratic Primary.

=== Later campaigns ===
After the 2016 presidential election, Duck founded the group Frederick Cares, which aimed to bridge political divides. Duck ran as a Democrat for the Maryland 6th congressional district race in 2018. In the Democratic primary, he criticized eventual-nominee and multimillionaire David Trone, saying Trone was buying the seat. In 2022, Duck ran for one of the three House of Delegates seats in Legislative District 4. Duck said he was not planning to run until he saw the political violence in the January 6 Capitol attack. He placed first in the Democratic primary but placed fourth in the general election, behind three Republicans. He is running for the same seat in the 2026 House of Delegates election.

== Bibliography ==
- "Duck: I'll take another shot at seat". Archived from the original on 2012-02-17.
- "Duck for Congress". Archived from the original on 13 August 2006.
- "Band of Brothers". Fighting Dems for Congress. Archived from the original on 18 August 2006.
- Bob Costantini. "A look at Maryland's sixth congressional district race". WYPR. Archived from the original on September 26, 2007.
- "Veteran vies for Bartlett's seat". The Washington Times. Archived from the original on 10 September 2006.
- "Democratic candidate visits Mount". The Mountain Echo.
- "The Fighting Democrats". The Tentacle. Archived from the original on 26 September 2006.
- "Campaign 2006: Key Race: U.S. House, Maryland District 6". The Washington Post.
- "Campaign Funding: Andrew James Duck (D, Maryland)". The Washington Post.
- "2006 Race: Maryland District 6". OpenSecrets.org. Archived from the original on 2006-05-08.
