= David R. Brinkley =

American politician

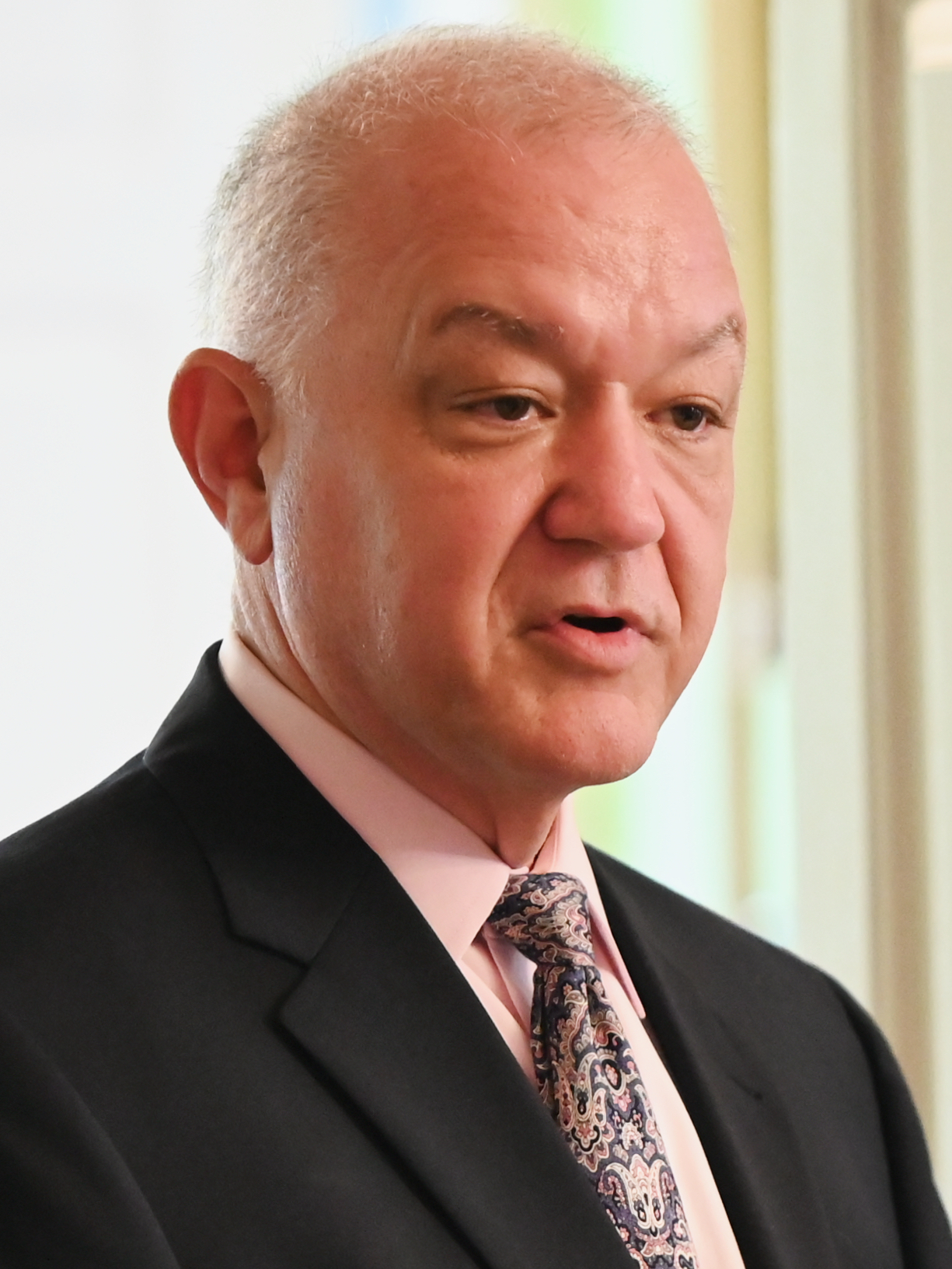
- Brinkley in 2021

Secretary of Budget and Management of Maryland
- In office February 13, 2015 – January 11, 2023; Acting: January 21, 2015 – February 13, 2015
- Governor: Larry Hogan
- Preceded by: T. Eloise Foster
- Succeeded by: Marc L. Nicole

Minority Leader of the Maryland Senate
- In office September 23, 2013 – November 12, 2014
- Whip: Christopher Shank
- Preceded by: E. J. Pipkin
- Succeeded by: J. B. Jennings
- In office January 10, 2007 – September 16, 2008
- Whip: Allan Kittleman
- Preceded by: J. Lowell Stoltzfus
- Succeeded by: Allan H. Kittleman

Member of the Maryland Senate from the 4th district
- In office January 8, 2003 – January 15, 2015
- Preceded by: Timothy R. Ferguson
- Succeeded by: Michael Hough

Member of the Maryland House of Delegates from the 4A district
- In office January, 1995 – January 8, 2003
- Preceded by: George Littrell & Thomas Hattery
- Succeeded by: Joseph R. Bartlett

Personal details
- Born: September 24, 1959 (age 66) Frederick, Maryland, U.S.
- Party: Republican
- Education: University of Maryland, College Park (BS)

David R. Brinkley (born September 24, 1959) is an American politician who served as the Secretary of Budget and Management for the U.S. state of Maryland from 2015 to 2023.

== Early life, education, and pre-political career ==
David Brinkley was born in Frederick, Maryland, the only son of Dr. George Ross Brinkley and Jean Brinkley. He was raised in New Market, Maryland and graduated from Linganore High School in 1977.

He attended Gettysburg College and received a Bachelor of Science degree at the University of Maryland, College Park in 1981.

He entered the life insurance business with Acacia Mutual Life Insurance Company, and earned his professional designations – Chartered Life Underwriter (CLU) & Chartered Financial Consultant (ChFC) – from The American College of Financial Services in Bryn Mawr, PA in October, 1984.

During the early-1980s, David was an EMT/Firefighter with the New Market District Volunteer Fire Company, and a volunteer EMT driver as Frederick County initiated its Paramedic program.

== Maryland House of Delegates ==
In 1994, Brinkley was elected to the House of Delegates, serving two terms representing District 4A. He was elected to the House of Delegates along with Paul S. Stull defeating Thomas Hattery and Thomas Gordon Slater. Incumbent George Littrell ran for the State Senate seat left open by Charles H. Smelser. Littrell was defeated by Timothy R. Ferguson.

As a member of the House of Delegates, he was Deputy Minority Whip from 1997 to 1998. In 1998, Stull and Brinkley easily won re-election defeating Democratic challenger Valerie M. Hertges.

== Maryland Senate ==
In 2002, Brinkley was elected to the Maryland Senate, representing District 4, which covers Carroll County and Frederick County. He defeated Republican incumbent Timothy R. Ferguson in the primary election. He went on to overwhelmingly defeat Timothy Schlauch in the general election.

In 2006, he defeated Republican challenger Paul Chamberlain in the primary election. He ran unopposed to any Democrats in the general election and convincingly defeated the write-ins.

=== Tenure ===
He was the Senate Minority Leader from 2007 to 2008.

In 2010, he was selected as Minority Whip alongside Senator Allan H. Kittleman who was selected as Minority Leader. When Kittleman resigned in 2011, Brinkley again ran for Minority Leader, but was rejected in favor of the conservative Senator Nancy Jacobs. Brinkley immediately resigned his position as Minority Whip upon losing the election to the more conservative Jacobs. Brinkley returned to the position of minority leader in 2013 following a five-year hiatus.

=== Committee assignments ===
- Finance Committee, 2013-2014
- Budget and Taxation Committee, 2003-2013
  - Education, business & administration subcommittee (2003–06, 2011-)
  - Health & Human Services subcommittee, (2007)
  - Pensions subcommittee (2007, 2011-)
  - Health, education & human resources subcommittee (2008–10)
- Joint Audit Committee (2004-)
- Rules Committee (2007-)
- Executive Nominations Committee (2007-)
- Legislative Policy Committee (2007-)
- Joint Committee on Administrative, Executive, and Legislative Review (2007-)
- Spending Affordability Committee (2008-)
- Special Joint Committee on Pensions (2011-)
- Joint Committee on Children, Youth, and Families (2003–08)
- Spending Affordability Committee (2007–08)
- Joint Committee on Legislative Ethics (2007–10)
- Joint Committee on the Selection of the State Treasurer (2007)

=== Other memberships ===
- Agricultural Stewardship Commission (2005–06 )
- Senate Special Commission on Electric Utility Deregulation Implementation (2005–06)
- Maryland Rural Caucus (2003-)
- Maryland Legislative Sportsmen's Caucus (2003-)
- Maryland Veterans Caucus (2004-)

== 2012 congressional election ==
After redistricting, 85-year-old Republican incumbent U.S. Congressman Roscoe Bartlett was placed into a district that Obama won. Portions of Baltimore and Harford counties as well as Carroll County were taken away from the 6th District during redistricting. More of Montgomery County was put into the district, while another part of Montgomery County was removed and added to northern Frederick County to reform the 8th District. His current district has Obama at just 40%, while the newly redrawn district has Obama at 56%.

In November, his chief of staff, Bud Otis, was reportedly soliciting the support of Maryland Republicans to run for his seat should he decide to retire. On November 30, 2011 Roll Call reported that Brinkley will run for Maryland's 6th congressional district and, “if necessary,” will primary Bartlett, according to his friend and supporter, state Delegate LeRoy Myers. In the Republican primary election in 2012, Brinkley won nearly 20% of the vote, falling short of Bartlett's 43.6%. Bartlett went on to lose the general election to Democrat John Delaney.

== 2014 election ==
Brinkley faced another Republican challenge from Delegate Michael Hough, who aligned himself with the more conservative Tea Party faction Hough accused Brinkley of being a "tax-and-spend liberal" and of cooperating too much with the Democratic majority and then-Governor Martin O'Malley. Hough crushed Brinkley in the primary election, 68%-32%.

Newly elected governor Larry Hogan appointed Brinkley to the position of Secretary of Budget and Management in January 2015.

== Electoral history ==
- 2014 Republican Primary Race for Maryland State Senate – District 4

Name	Votes	Percent	Outcome
Michael Hough, Rep.	8,946	67.7%	Won
David R. Brinkley, Rep.	4,261	32.3%	Lost

- 2010 Race for Maryland State Senate – District 4

Name	Votes	Percent	Outcome
David R. Brinkley, Rep.	31,522	72.8%	Won
Sara Lou Trescott, Dem.	11,733	27.1%	Lost
Other (Write-Ins)	50	0.1%	Lost

- 2006 Race for Maryland State Senate – District 4

Name	Votes	Percent	Outcome
David R. Brinkley, Rep.	33,879	98.7%	Won
Other (Write-Ins)	455	1.3%	Lost

- 2002 Race for Maryland State Senate – District 4

Name	Votes	Percent	Outcome
David R. Brinkley, Rep.	29,231	76.4%	Won
Timothy Schlauch, Dem.	8,957	23.4%	Lost
Other (Write-Ins)	82	0.2%	Lost

- 1998 Race for Maryland House of Delegates – District 4A

Voters to choose two:

Name	Votes	Percent	Outcome
David R. Brinkley, Rep.	15,383	39%	Won
Paul S. Stull, Rep	14,559	37%	Won
Valerie M. Hertges, Dem	9,892	25%	Lost

- 1994 Race for Maryland House of Delegates – District 4A

Voters to choose two:

Name	Votes	Percent	Outcome
David R. Brinkley, Rep.	12,296	31%	Won
Paul S. Stull, Rep	11,789	30%	Won
Thomas Hattery, Dem	9,900	25%	Lost
Thomas Gordon Slater, Dem	5,785	15%	Lost
