= Louise Virginia Snodgrass =

American politician

Member of the Maryland House of Delegates from the 3rd district
- In office January 11, 1995 – January 8, 2003
- Preceded by: James E. McClellan
- Succeeded by: Paul Stull

Mayor of Middletown, Maryland
- In office 1988–1994

Personal details
- Born: June 28, 1942 Baltimore, Maryland, U.S.
- Died: June 12, 2009 (aged 66) Dover, Delaware, U.S.
- Party: Republican

Louise Virginia Snodgrass (June 28, 1942 – June 12, 2009) was a member of the Maryland House of Delegates, District 3 in Frederick and Washington Counties. She was also Mayor of Middletown from 1988 to 1994.

== Background ==
Delegate Snodgrass is a former Maryland Delegate known for her representation of rural western Maryland, her representation of small town issues, and her advocacy for special needs issues including the blind and the deaf. Delegate Snodgrass lost reelection in 2002 when her District 3 was redrawn and she was put into District 4A, which only had 2 representatives instead of the 3 that District 3 had.

== Education ==
Delegate Snodgrass attended Frederick Community College in Frederick, Maryland. She later attended the University of Maryland Dental School in Baltimore, Maryland to become a certified dental assistant.

== Career ==
After college, Louise Snodgrass was a dental assistant, receiving her certification in 1969. Where she worked for Dr. Newman DDS in Frederick, Maryland with other dental staff such as Jan Osmolski (née Ricci). She was a member of the Maryland Dental Assistants Association from 1979 until 1985 and is a past-president. She was also a trustee for the American Dental Assistants Association from 1980 until 1983.

=== Early political activism ===
Prior to being elected to the Maryland House of Delegates, Snodgrass was the Burgess (mayor) of the Town of Middletown in Frederick County, Maryland from 1988 until 1994.

Snodgrass formerly became active in politics when she became a member of Frederick County Republican Central Committee in 1986. She remained a member until 1994 and is a past secretary and vice-chair. She was also a member of the Frederick County Republican Men's Club, the Republican Women's Club of Frederick County, and the Washington County Republican Club.

Delegate Snodgrass is a current member of the Frederick Chapter of the Maryland Municipal League. She has been a member of the organization since 1989 and has served as president, vice-president, & secretary-treasurer. She was the president of the Frederick County Council of Government from 1991 until 1993. From 1991 until 1994, Snodgrass served on the board of directors of the Maryland Mayors Association.

=== Community work ===
In addition to her political work, she has also served her community by being a breast cancer support spokesperson, Y-Me of the Cumberland Valley in 1999. She is a member of the Frederick County Community Cancer Coalition. Furthermore, she is a member of the Frederick County Even Start Advisory Board. She is a Life member of the Middletown Historical Society. She is a past member of the J. Elmer Harp Medical Center, Inc.

=== House of Delegates career ===
Once elected to the Maryland House of Delegates, Snodgrass was active on several committees, including the Commerce and Government Matters Committee from 1995 until 2003, which included the procurement subcommittee from 1995 until 1998, the financial institutions' subcommittee from 1999 until 2003, and the ethics and election laws subcommittee from 2002 until 2003. She was also on the Joint Committee to Study Mandates on Local Government from 1995 until 1997 and the Joint Committee on Protocol from 1999 until 2003. Snodgrass was the Chair of the Frederick County Delegation from 2000 until 2003, serving as vice-chair in 1997 and again in 1999. She was a member of Women Legislators of Maryland from 1995 until 2003.

Also during her tenure as a delegate, she was a member of the Task Force on Funding for the Maryland School for the Deaf in 1996. She was on the Maryland Civil War Heritage Commission from 1996 until 1999. Snodgrass was also a member of the executive board for the Forum for Rural Maryland from 1997 until 2003. From 1997 until 2003 she was on the advisory board for the Institute for Governmental Service at the University of Maryland, College Park. She served as secretary/treasurer from 1997 until 2003. Additionally, Delegate Snodgrass was a member of the Local Management Board for the Office for Children and Youth in Washington County, Maryland, on the advisory board for the Community Action Agency in Frederick County, Maryland, the School Services Advisory Board in Frederick County, and the Task Force on the South Mountain Battlefield Historic Tourism Initiative from 1999 until 2000. Finally, she was on the Health and Safety Committee for the Frederick County Commission on Aging.

=== Awards ===
Delegate Snodgrass has won many awards over her long and distinguished career including being named the Outstanding Legislator of the Year by the Maryland Municipal League in 1995. She has won awards for support of municipal priorities from the Maryland Municipal League in 1996, 1997, 1998, 1999, and 2000. Snodgrass won the Appreciation Award from the Maryland School for the Deaf in 1997, and the Senator Idamae Garrott Award by the American Council of the Blind, also in 1997. In 1999 she won the Friend of Rural Water Award by the Maryland Rural Water Association, an award that was renamed the Louise V. Snodgrass Award in 2000. In 2000 Delegate Snodgrass received the Appreciation Award from the Civil War Medical Museum and the Distinguished Alumni Award from Frederick Community College. Finally, in 2001 she was named on Maryland's Top 100 Women list by the Daily Record.

== Election results ==
- 2002 election for Maryland House of Delegates District 4A

Voters to choose no more than two:

Name	Votes	Percent	Outcome
Paul S. Stull, Rep.	16,830	36.3%	Won
Joseph R. Bartlett, Rep.	14,720	31.7%	Won
Valerie Moore Dale, Dem.	7,399	15.9%	Lost
Dick Franklin, Dem.	6,001	12.9%	Lost
Louise Snodgrass, Rep.	1,472	3.2%	Lost

- 1998 election for Maryland House of Delegates – District 3

Voters to choose three:

Name	Votes	Percent	Outcome
Louise V. Snodgrass, Rep.	19,196	21%	Won
C. Sue Hecht, Dem.	17,968	19%	Won
Joseph R. Bartlett, Rep.	15,784	17%	Won
William M. Castle, Rep.	15,251	17%	Lost
Richard L. Stup, Dem.	13,191	14%	Lost
David P. Koontz, Dem.	10,858	12%	Lost

- 1994 election for Maryland House of Delegates – District 3

Voters to choose three:

Name	Votes	Percent	Outcome
J. Anita Stup, Rep.	20,262	25%	Won
Louise V. Snodgrass, Rep.	14,071	17%	Won
C. Sue Hecht, Dem.	12,700	15%	Won
Ronald L. Sundergill, Dem.	12,466	15%	Lost
Melvin L. Castle, Rep.	12,227	15%	Lost
Royd Smith, Dem.	10,810	13%	Lost
