= Donald B. Elliott =

American politician (1931–2024)

- Member, Maryland House of Delegates

Member, Maryland House of Delegates from District 4B
- In office January 14, 1987 – January 14, 2015
- Preceded by: V. Lanny Harchenhorn
- Succeeded by: David E. Vogt III
- Constituency: Legislative District 4B, Carroll & Frederick Counties

Personal details
- Born: October 18, 1931 Baltimore, Maryland, U.S.
- Died: October 7, 2024 (aged 92) Frederick, Maryland, U.S.
- Party: Republican
- Profession: Politician, pharmacist

Donald B. Elliott (October 18, 1931 – October 7, 2024) was an American politician of the Republican Party in the state of Maryland. He served from 1986 to 2015 as a member of the Maryland House of Delegates. He served as the representative of Maryland legislative district 4B, which encompasses Carroll and Frederick Counties in Western Maryland. Delegate Elliott was known for his dedication to health care issues, particularly the crisis in Maryland regarding uncompensated care, and worked in later years to address the issue of removing citizens from the uninsured rolls through various measures.

== Background ==
Elliott was first elected to the Maryland House of Delegates in 1986 to represent District 4B, which covers Carroll and Frederick Counties. He originally defeated Republican incumbent Delegate Lanny V. Harchenhorn, and defeated Democrat Robert George Fehle Sr. in the general election. He sat on the House Health & Government Operations Committee as the ranking minority member, and also on two subcommittees; the House Insurance Subcommittee and the House Health Facilities & Occupations Subcommittee.

== Education ==
Elliott attended Kenwood High School in Baltimore County. He graduated from the University of Maryland School of Pharmacy in 1957. He later attended St. John's University, New York, to continue his study of pharmaceutical chemistry.

== Career ==
Elliott served in the United States Navy and remained in the Naval Reserve until 1971, retiring at the rank of Lt. Commander.

Delegate Elliott has worked as a pharmacist in several capacities, including owning & operating two pharmacies in Carroll County, and remained a registered pharmacist.

During his time in the legislature, Elliott had concentrated his efforts on the Health & Government Operations Committee towards reforming Maryland's health insurance market.

Delegate Elliott introduced legislation in the 2008 session centering on personal responsibility with regards to health insurance. This legislation encompassed one piece of the noted Massachusetts health care reform. The personal responsibility concept has been endorsed by former Massachusetts Governor Mitt Romney, and also former U.S. Speaker of the House Newt Gingrich.

During the 2010 session of the Maryland General Assembly, he attempted to eliminate the requirement to have all vehicles in Maryland have front license plates. The Maryland Department of Legislative Services estimated this would have saved the state over $500,000 the first year alone, with savings of over $750,000 in subsequent years.

Elliott officially retired from politics and the Maryland Legislature in January 2015.

=== Legislative notes ===
- voted against the Clean Indoor Air Act of 2007 (HB359)
- voted for income tax reduction in 1998 (SB750)
- voted against in-state tuition for illegal immigrants in 2007 (HB6)

== Death ==
Elliott died in Frederick, Maryland, on October 7, 2024, at the age of 92.

== Election results ==
- 2006 election for Maryland House of Delegates – District 4B

Voters to choose one:

Name	Votes	Percent	Outcome
Donald B. Elliott, Rep.	10,148	69.8%	Won
Timothy Schlauch, Dem.	4,374	30.1%	Lost
Other Write-Ins	12	0.1%	Lost

- 2002 election for Maryland House of Delegates – District 4B

Voters to choose one:

Name	Votes	Percent	Outcome
Donald B. Elliott, Rep.	10,321	75.7%	Won
Thomas Henry Morrison, Dem.	7,399	15.9%	Lost
Other Write-Ins	14	0.1%	Lost

- 1998 election for Maryland House of Delegates – District 4B

Voters to choose one:

Name	Votes	Percent	Outcome
Donald B. Elliott, Rep.	6,897	67%	Won
Ann M. Ballard, Dem.	3,452	33%	Lost

- 1994 election for Maryland House of Delegates – District 4B

Voters to choose one:

Name	Votes	Percent	Outcome
Donald B. Elliott, Rep.	7,403	78%	Won
Roy Pfeiffer, Dem.	2,050	22%	Lost

- 1990 election for Maryland House of Delegates – District 4B

Voters to choose one:

Name	Votes	Percent	Outcome
Donald B. Elliott, Rep.	6,061	69%	Won
William D. Henley Sr., Dem.	2,695	31%	Lost

- 1986 election for Maryland House of Delegates – District 4B

Voters to choose one:

Name	Votes	Percent	Outcome
Donald B. Elliott, Rep.	5,295	72%	Won
Robert George Fehle Sr., Dem.	2,018	27%	Lost
