= Gene Conti =

American government official (born 1946)

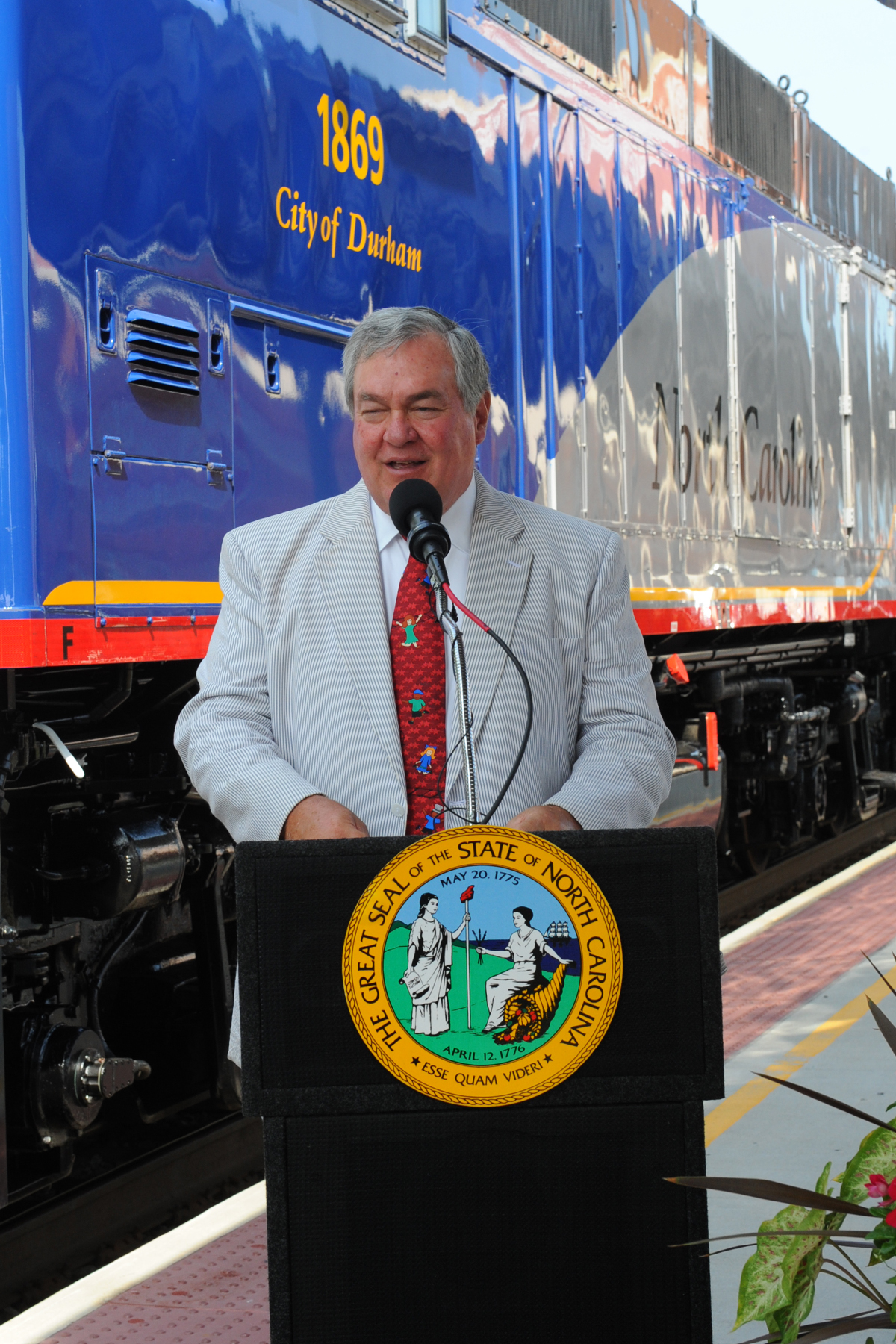
Conti on 2011

Eugene A. "Gene" Conti Jr. (born December 23, 1946) is an American government official.

Born December 23, 1946, and raised in Pittsburgh, Conti served as Secretary of the Maryland Department of Labor from 1995 until 1998, when he became U.S. Assistant Secretary for Transportation Policy at the United States Department of Transportation.

From 2001 through 2003, he served as deputy secretary of the North Carolina Department of Transportation.

In 2009, Conti was appointed NCDOT secretary by Governor-elect Beverly Perdue. He served until January 2013, when he was succeeded by Tony Tata.
