= W. Raymond Beck =

American politician

Walter Raymond "Ray" Beck, Jr.

Member of the Maryland House of Delegates from the 39th district
- In office January 11, 1995 – January 13, 1999
- Succeeded by: Charles E. Barkley, Paul Carlson, & Joan F. Stern

Personal details
- Born: December 7, 1932 (age 93) Chicago, Illinois, U.S.
- Died: December 31, 2014 Lewes, Delaware, U.S.
- Party: Republican

Walter Raymond "Ray" Beck, Jr. (December 7, 1932—December 31, 2014), was a member of the Maryland House of Delegates from District 39.

Walter Raymond Beck, Jr. was born in Chicago, Illinois. He graduated from Downers Grove High School in Downers Grove, Illinois in 1950. He graduated from the United States Naval Academy in 1954. He retired from the United States Navy in 1984 and worked for Vitro Corporation as a consultant. He served in the Maryland House of Delegates from 1994 to 1999 and was a Republican. In 2007, Beck and his wife moved to Lewes, Delaware. Beck died in Lewes, Delaware.

== Election results ==
- 1994 Race for Maryland House of Delegates – District 39

Voters to choose three:

Name	Votes	Percent	Outcome
Mathew Mossburg, Rep.	13,119	17%	Won
W. Raymond Beck, Rep.	12,311	16%	Won
Barrie Ciliberti, Rep.	12,897	16%	Won
Charles E. Barkley, Dem.	12,137	15%	Lost
Anise Key Brown, Dem.	10,987	14%	Lost
Anthony J. Santangelo, Dem.	10,939	14%	Lost
Patricia Cummings, Ind.	6,471	8%	Lost
