= Portia Wu =

American lawyer (born 1970)

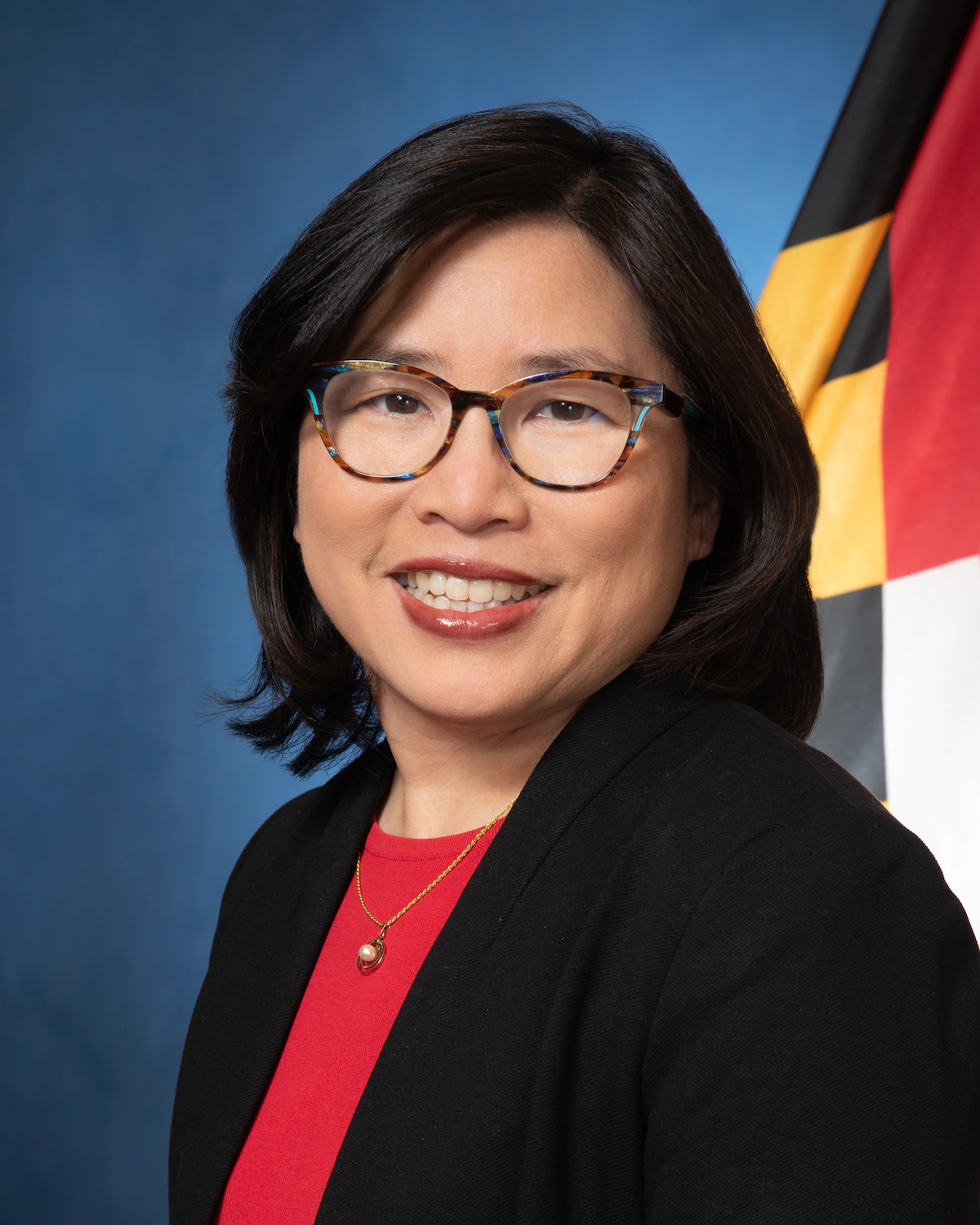
- Wu in 2023

Secretary of the Maryland Department of Labor
- Incumbent
- Assumed office January 18, 2023
- Governor: Wes Moore
- Preceded by: Tiffany P. Robinson

U.S. Assistant Secretary of Labor for Employment and Training
- In office April 2, 2014 – 2017
- President: Barack Obama

Personal details
- Born: Portia Yu-Jung Wu; July 23, 1970 (age 55) New Haven, Connecticut, U.S.
- Education: Yale University (BA, JD); Cornell University (MA)
- Wu's voice Wu on state resources available to federal workers impacted by mass layoffs. Recorded March 6, 2025

Portia Yu-Jung Wu (born July 23, 1970) is an American lawyer serving as the secretary of the Maryland Department of Labor since 2023. She was previously the managing director of public policy at Microsoft from 2018 to 2023 and the U.S. assistant secretary of labor for employment and training from 2014 to 2017.

== Early life and education ==
Wu was born on July 23, 1970, in New Haven, Connecticut, to a Taiwanese American family. Her parents, An-Ya Shih Wu and Tom Wu, were doctors who spent most of their careers at the Veterans Administration hospital in Albany, New York. Wu spent her early years in Delmar, New York, where she distinguished herself academically and artistically, winning a $300 first-prize in a piano competition during her tenth-grade year. Wu graduated from Bethlehem Central High School in 1987.

After high school, Wu attended Yale University, where she earned a B.A. in 1991. She then earned an M.A. in comparative literature from Cornell University in 1993 and obtained a J.D. from Yale Law School in 1998. Afterwards, she clerked for Judge Richard Paez of the U.S. District Court for the Central District of California from 1998 to 1999.

== Career ==
From 2000 to 2003, Wu was an associate at the law firm Bredhoff & Kaiser. While there, she represented workers in industries undergoing significant changes. Wu worked with hotel housekeepers, garment workers, firefighters, steel mill and factory workers, representing them during times of economic hardship and job loss.

In 2003, Wu became a staff member for the U.S. Senate Committee on Health, Education, Labor, and Pensions (HELP), working under U.S. senators Tom Harkin and Edward Kennedy. She held several positions, including labor and pensions counsel, chief labor and pensions counsel, and labor policy director and general counsel. Wu's work with the committee focused on various labor and employment issues, including workforce development and worker protections. She addressed issues such as mine safety, pension reform, and workers' compensation. Wu played a role in Kennedy's Unemployment Insurance Modernization Act, which incentivized states to update unemployment laws. Wu contributed to discussions on immigration reform, particularly regarding labor programs and the balance between employer needs and worker protections. She remained with the committee until 2010.

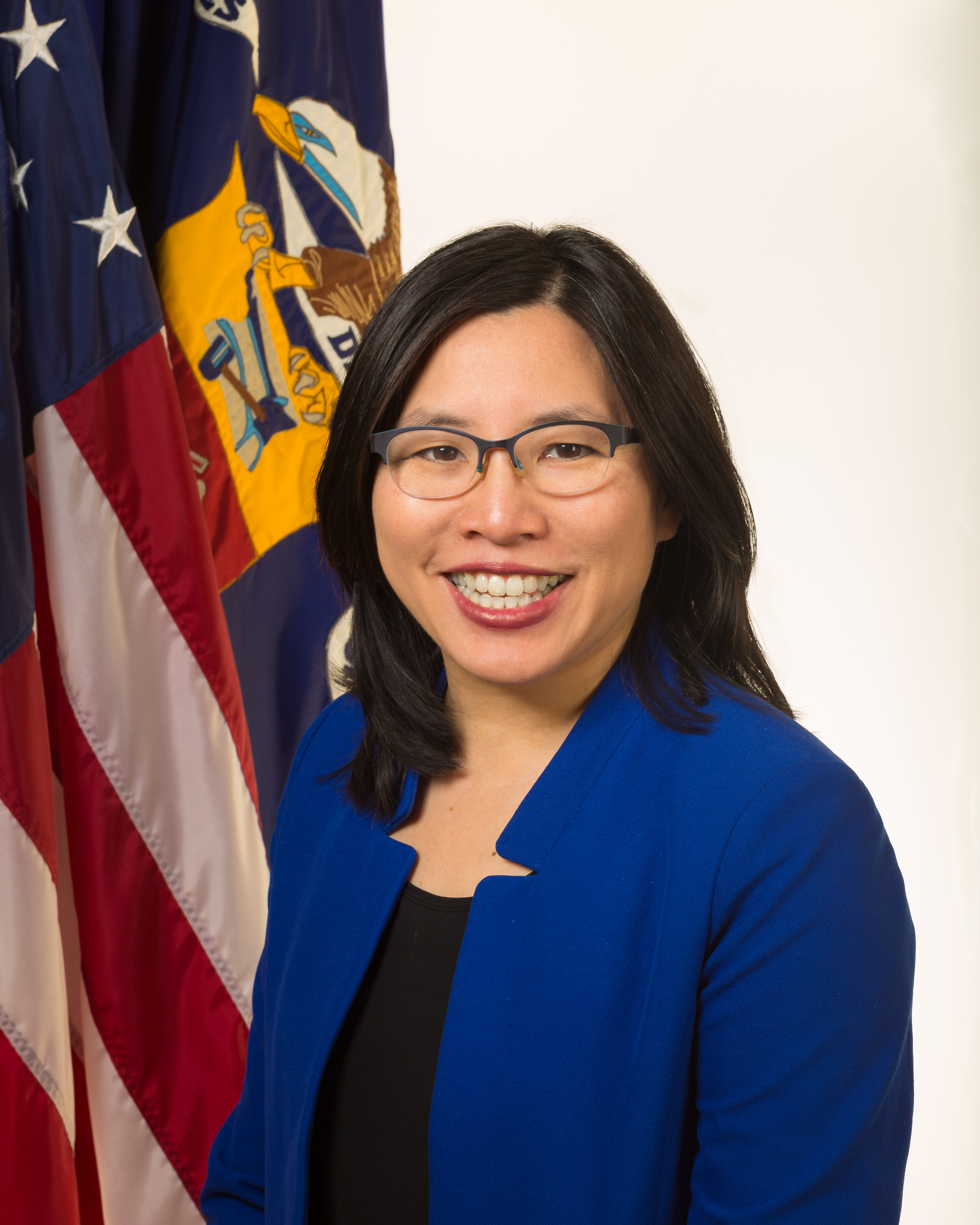
U.S. Assistant Secretary of Labor Wu in 2014

In 2010, Wu joined the National Partnership for Women & Families as vice president. The organization focuses on promoting health care access, reproductive rights, and workplace fairness, with specific policies related to paid family leave and paid sick days. Wu remained with the National Partnership for Women and Families until 2011.

In 2011, Wu joined the Obama administration as a senior policy advisor at the U.S. Domestic Policy Council as a senior policy advisor for mobility and opportunity. She worked on job training and skills development initiatives. She led a cross-agency priority working group focused on job training, data transparency, and accountability. Wu also worked on projects aimed at supporting community colleges, improving workforce development systems, and reforming unemployment insurance to better connect job seekers with employment opportunities. In 2012, she was appointed as special assistant to the president for labor and workforce policy. On December 12, 2013, U.S. president Barack Obama nominated Wu to serve as the U.S. assistant secretary of labor for the Employment and Training Administration (ETA) under U.S. Labor Secretary Tom Perez. The U.S. Senate confirmed her appointment on April 2, 2014. At the ETA, Wu oversaw a range of job-training initiatives aimed at both first-time workers and those seeking retraining due to job displacement, reflecting her longstanding focus on workforce development. She left the job in 2017.

From 2018 to 2023, Wu was managing director of public policy at Microsoft. She negotiated a labor agreement, a rare occurrence in the tech industry. Her work at Microsoft also involved immigration policy and broader workforce-related matters.

Wu was appointed acting secretary of the Maryland Department of Labor by Governor Wes Moore on January 18, 2023. She was confirmed March 2, 2023.

== Personal life ==
Wu married Brad Peniston on April 21, 2007. As of January 2023, she resided in Chevy Chase, Maryland.
