= J. Anita Stup =

American politician (born 1945)

Member of the Maryland House of Delegates from the 3B district (1991 - 1995) and District 3 (1995 - 1999)
- In office 1991 – January 13, 1999
- Succeeded by: Joseph R. Bartlett

Personal details
- Born: March 8, 1945 (age 81) Washington, D.C.
- Party: Republican

J. Anita Stup (born March 8, 1945) is an American politician who served as a member of the Maryland House of Delegates from 1991 to 1999.

== Early life and education ==
Stup was born in Washington, D.C., and attended Montgomery Junior College.

== Career ==
Stup was first elected in 1991 to represent District 3B, defeating Democrat Royd Smith. She shared the district with Democrat James E. McClellan.

In the 1994 Republican primary election, Stup won one of three spots on the newly-consolidated District 3, along with Louise Virginia Snodgrass and Melvin Castle.

In addition to her work as a state delegate, Stup was also a member of the Advisory Committee on School Construction and Advisory Committee on Redistricting for the Frederick County Superintendent of Schools. She also served on the Board of County Commissioners for Frederick County from 1982 to 1986, and again from 1986 to 1990.
