= Paul S. Stull =

American politician

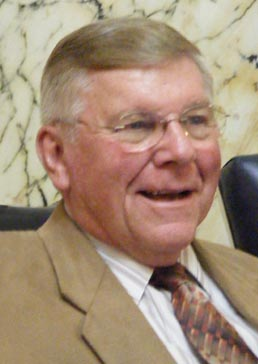

Member of the Maryland House of Delegates from the 4A district
- In office January 11, 1995 – January 2011 Serving with Joseph R. Bartlett
- Preceded by: Thomas Hattery
- Succeeded by: Kathy Afzali, Kelly M. Schulz

Personal details
- Born: May 8, 1936 (age 90) Lewistown, Maryland
- Party: Republican
- Spouse: Johanna
- Education: University of Maryland (BS); West Virginia University (MS)
- Profession: Teacher

Paul S. Stull (born May 8, 1936) is an American politician and was member of the Maryland House of Delegates.

== Background ==
Paul Stull was first elected to the Maryland House of Delegates in 1995 to represent District 4A, which covers Frederick County, Maryland. He defeated incumbent Thomas Hattery. He served District 4A along with Joseph R. Bartlett.

== Education ==
Stull graduated from the University of Maryland in 1964 with his B.S. degree in Agriculture. He later received his M.S. degree in 1964 from West Virginia University.

== Career ==
Stull served as a teacher and principal for 25 years. From 1968-1974 he was an adult education instructor with Frederick County Public Schools. He was later the Principal of the Frederick County Career and Technology Center from 1976-88. Later, he was an instructor at Frederick Community College from 1982-85. Finally, he served as Coordinator of school construction from 1988-92 for Frederick County Public Schools.

=== Legislative notes ===
- voted against the Clean Indoor Air Act of 2007 (HB359)
- voted against in-state tuition for illegal immigrants in 2007 (HB6)
- voted against the Healthy Air Act in 2006 (SB154)
- voted for slots in 2005 (HB1361)
- voted for income tax reduction in 1998 (SB750)

== Election results ==
- 2006 Race for Maryland House of Delegates – District 4A

Voters to choose two:

Name	Votes	Percent	Outcome
Joseph R. Bartlett, Rep.	16,545	36.8%	Won
Paul S. Stull, Rep	17,765	39.5%	Won
Maggi Margaret Hays, Dem	10,519	23.4%	Lost
Other Write-Ins	140	0.3%	Lost

- 2002 Race for Maryland House of Delegates – District 4A

Voters to choose two:

Name	Votes	Percent	Outcome
Joseph R. Bartlett, Rep.	14,720	31.7%	Won
Paul S. Stull, Rep	16,830	36.3%	Won
Valerie Moore Dale, Dem	7,399	15.9%	Lost
Dick Franklin, Dem	6,001	12.9%	Lost
Louise Virginia Snodgrass, Rep Write-In	1,472	3.2%	Lost

- 1998 Race for Maryland House of Delegates – District 4A

Voters to choose two:

Name	Votes	Percent	Outcome
David R. Brinkley, Rep.	15,383	39%	Won
Paul S. Stull, Rep	14,559	37%	Won
Valerie M. Hertges, Dem	9,892	25%	Lost

- 1994 Race for Maryland House of Delegates – District 4A

Voters to choose two:

Name	Votes	Percent	Outcome
David R. Brinkley, Rep.	12,296	31%	Won
Paul S. Stull, Rep	11,789	30%	Won
Thomas Hattery, Dem	9,900	25%	Lost
Thomas Gordon Slater, Dem	5,785	15%	Lost
