= Freedom to Display the American Flag Act of 2005 =

United States law

- Long title: An Act to ensure that the right of an individual to display the flag of the United States on residential property not be abridged
- Enacted by: the 109th United States Congress

Citations
- Public law: Pub. L. 109–243 (text) (PDF)
- Statutes at Large: 120 Stat. 572

Legislative history
- Introduced in the House as H.R. 42 by Roscoe Bartlett (R–MD) on January 4, 2005; Passed the House on June 27, 2006 (voice vote); Passed the Senate on July 17, 2006 (unanimous consent); Signed into law by President George W. Bush on July 24, 2006

The flag of the United States

The Freedom to Display the American Flag Act of 2005 (Pub. L. 109–243 (text) (PDF), 120 Stat. 572, enacted July 24, 2006) is an Act of Congress that prohibits condominium associations, cooperative associations, and residential real estate management associations from restricting homeowners from displaying the flag of the United States on their property or property as to which they have a right to exclusive possession or use.

== Legislative history ==
The bill was introduced into the 109th Congress on January 4, 2005. It was sponsored by Roscoe Bartlett and 13 other members of the House of Representatives. Both houses adopted it by unanimous consent.

- June 27, 2006: The bill was passed in the House of Representatives by voice vote.
- July 17, 2006: The bill passed by unanimous consent in the Senate.
- July 24, 2006: President George W. Bush signed the bill into law.

In signing the act, President George W. Bush said: "Americans have long flown our flag at their homes as an expression of their appreciation for our freedoms and their pride in our Nation. As our brave men and women continue to fight to protect our country overseas, Congress has passed an important measure to protect our citizens' right to express their patriotism here at home without burdensome restrictions."

== The Act ==
The "Freedom to Display the American Flag Act of 2005" (Pub. L. 109–243 (text) (PDF), 120 Stat. 572, enacted July 24, 2006) is an Act of Congress that prohibits condominium associations, cooperative associations, and resident real estate management associations from restricting homeowners from adopting or enforce any policy, or entering into any agreement, that would "restrict or prevent a member of the association from displaying the flag of the United States on residential property within the association with respect to which such member has a separate ownership interest or a right to exclusive possession or use."

The word flag in the act includes any flag or of any part of a flag "upon which shall be shown the colors, the stars and the stripes, in any number of either thereof, or of any part or parts of either, by which the average person seeing the same without deliberation may believe the same to represent the flag ... of the United States of America."

== See also ==
- Jupiter, Florida#United States flag incident
