= Mathew Mossburg =

American politician (born 1967)

Mathew J. Mossburg

Delegate Maryland District 39
- In office January 11, 1995 – January 13, 1999
- Succeeded by: Charles E. Barkley, Paul Carlson, & Joan F. Stern
- Constituency: Montgomery County, Maryland

Personal details
- Born: February 21, 1967 (age 59) Silver Spring, MD
- Party: Republican

Mathew J. Mossburg (born February 21, 1967, in Silver Spring, Maryland) is a business owner and former Republican legislator in the Maryland House of Delegates.

== Education ==
Delegate Mossburg was educated at Puritan Christian School in Laytonsville, MD. He graduated from Georgetown University Bachelor's degree in 1992.

== Career ==
Mossburg was a one-term delegate from the heavily Democratic Montgomery County, Maryland. District 39, in 1994, was fully Republican with Mossburg, W. Raymond Beck, and Barrie S. Ciliberti. However, Maryland Governor Parris Glendening redrew many districts in the Democrats' favor. Though his original map was redrawn by the court system, Republicans suffered with all three in this district losing in the 1998 election.

While a member of the Maryland House of Delegates, Mossburg was a member of the Economic Matters Committee from 1995 until 1996, the Appropriations Committee in 1997, and the Commerce and Government Matters Committee from 1998 until 1999.

== Election results ==
- 1998 Race for Maryland House of Delegates – District 39

Voters to choose three:

Name	Votes	Percent	Outcome
Charles E. Barkley, Dem.	17,020	18%	Won
Paul Carlson, Dem.	16,670	18%	Won
Joan F. Stern, Dem.	16,515	18%	Won
Barrie S. Ciliberti, Rep.	14,420	16%	Lost
Walter McKee, Rep.	14,412	16%	Lost
Mathew Mossburg, Rep.	13,439	15%	Lost

- 1994 Race for Maryland House of Delegates – District 39

Voters to choose three:

Name	Votes	Percent	Outcome
Mathew Mossburg, Rep.	13,119	17%	Won
W. Raymond Beck, Rep.	12,311	16%	Won
Barrie S. Ciliberti, Rep.	12,897	16%	Won
Charles E. Barkley, Dem.	12,137	15%	Lost
Anise Key Brown, Dem.	10,987	14%	Lost
Anthony J. Santangelo, Dem.	10,939	14%	Lost
Patricia Cummings, Ind.	6,471	8%	Lost
