= Thomas Hattery =

American politician (1954–2024)

Member of the Maryland House of Delegates
- In office January 12, 1983 – January 11, 1995 Serving with George Littrell Jr.
- Preceded by: Basil B. Day and Charles E. Smith
- Succeeded by: David R. Brinkley and Paul S. Stull
- Constituency: District 4A

Personal details
- Born: January 20, 1954 Silver Spring, Maryland, U.S.
- Died: October 10, 2024 (aged 70) near Mount Airy, Maryland, U.S.
- Party: Democratic

Thomas Harold Hattery (January 20, 1954 – October 10, 2024) was an American politician from the state of Maryland. He served as a Democratic member of the Maryland House of Delegates, representing District 4A from 1983 to 1995, and ran for Maryland's 6th congressional district in 1980 and 1992. He died from cancer near Mount Airy, Maryland, on October 10, 2024, at the age of 70.

== Electoral history ==
=== 1980 ===
Maryland's 6th congressional district election, 1980 primary * denotes incumbent Source:
| Party | Candidate | Votes | % |
|---|---|---|---|
| Democratic | Beverly Byron* | 38,842 | 71.0 |
| Democratic | Thomas Hattery | 6,388 | 11.7 |
| Democratic | William B. McMahon | 3,880 | 7.1 |
| Democratic | Kent Sullivan | 2,746 | 5.0 |
| Democratic | Melvin C. Perkins | 1,457 | 2.7 |
| Democratic | John J. Kubricky | 1,356 | 2.5 |
| Total votes | | 54,669 | 100 |

=== 1982 ===
Maryland House of Delegates, District 4A, 1982 election * denotes incumbent Source:
| Party | Candidate | Votes | % |
|---|---|---|---|
| Democratic | George Littrell Jr. | 7,796 | 29.6 |
| Democratic | Thomas Hattery | 7,279 | 27.6 |
| Republican | Mary G. Williams | 6,652 | 25.3 |
| Republican | Hugh M. Warner | 4,608 | 17.5 |
| Total votes | | 26,335 | 100 |

=== 1986 ===
Maryland House of Delegates, District 4A, 1986 election * denotes incumbent Source:
| Party | Candidate | Votes | % |
|---|---|---|---|
| Democratic | Thomas Hattery* | 9,014 | 31.7 |
| Democratic | George Littrell Jr.* | 8,391 | 29.5 |
| Republican | Kenneth R. Coffey | 7,954 | 27.9 |
| Republican | Larry W. Cook | 3,113 | 10.9 |
| Total votes | | 28,472 | 100 |

=== 1990 ===
Maryland House of Delegates, District 4A, 1990 election * denotes incumbent Source:
| Party | Candidate | Votes | % |
|---|---|---|---|
| Democratic | George Littrell Jr.* | 10,424 | 36.8 |
| Democratic | Thomas Hattery* | 10,209 | 36.0 |
| Republican | Seth F. Stein | 7,717 | 27.2 |
| Total votes | | 28,350 | 100 |

=== 1992 ===
Maryland's 6th congressional district election, 1992 primary * denotes incumbent Source:
| Party | Candidate | Votes | % |
|---|---|---|---|
| Democratic | Thomas Hattery | 29,959 | 56.1 |
| Democratic | Beverly Byron* | 23,434 | 43.9 |
| Total votes | | 53,393 | 100 |

Maryland's 6th congressional district election, 1992 election * denotes incumbent Source:
| Party | Candidate | Votes | % |
|---|---|---|---|
| Republican | Roscoe Bartlett | 125,564 | 54.2 |
| Democratic | Thomas Hattery | 106,224 | 45.8 |
| | scattering | 69 | 0.0 |
| Total votes | | 231,857 | 100 |

=== 1994 ===
Maryland House of Delegates, District 4A, 1994 election * denotes incumbent Source:
| Party | Candidate | Votes | % |
|---|---|---|---|
| Republican | David R. Brinkley | 12,296 | 30.9 |
| Republican | Paul S. Stull | 11,789 | 29.6 |
| Democratic | Thomas Hattery* | 9,900 | 24.9 |
| Democratic | Thomas Gordon Slater | 5,785 | 14.5 |
| Total votes | | 39,770 | 100 |
