= Timothy R. Ferguson =

Republican State Senator in Maryland

Member of the Maryland Senate from the 4th district
- In office January 11, 1995 – January 8, 2003
- Preceded by: Charles H. Smelser
- Succeeded by: David R. Brinkley

Personal details
- Born: January 22, 1955 (age 71) Baltimore, Maryland, U.S.
- Party: Republican

Timothy Ferguson (born January 22, 1955) is a Republican former State Senator from Maryland.

== Background ==
In 1994, Timothy Ferguson was first elected to the Maryland State Senate to represent District 4, which covers parts of Carroll and Frederick Counties. In that election, he defeated Democratic challenger George Littrell, a former member of the Maryland House of Delegates.

In 1998, Ferguson ran for reelection, defeating Democrat George Littrell with 55% of the vote.

In 2002, Ferguson ran for reelection, but was overwhelmingly defeated by fellow Republican and former Maryland Delegate David R. Brinkley in the primary election. Brinkley went on to defeat Timothy Schlauch in the general election.

== Education ==
Ferguson attended Eastern Vocational-Technical High School in Essex, Maryland. He later attended Broome County Community College in Broome, New York where he majored in Computer-Aided-Design. Broome Community College is part of the SUNY two-year college program.

He earned a Private Pilot's License in 1985 while working for Sundstrand Corporation in Rockford, Illinois.

He was fully trained in 2008 as a Lean Six Sigma "Green Belt." He earned a "CMIIC" certification from the Institute of Configuration Management in March 2009 and a "CMIIP" certification in November 2009. He has spoken at ICM Annual conferences and formed a corporation, ARTIS Professionals, LLC, for consultation and implementation of program acquisition process improvements and configuration management.

== Career ==
Ferguson was a member of the South Carroll Republican Club, serving as President in 1992. Outside of his political work, he was a member of the Farm Bureau, the Jaycees, the 4-H, and the Chamber of Commerce. He also is a Life Member of the National Rifle Association (NRA).

While working in the State Senate, Ferguson was a member of the Executive Nominations Committee from 1995 until 2000, and the Judicial Proceedings Committee from 1995 until 2003. In addition, he was a member of the Joint Committee on Investigation from 1995 until 2003 and the Joint Committee on Children, Youth, and Families from 1999 until 2003. Finally, he was chair of the Frederick County Delegation from 1999 until 2003.

Despite his lifetime membership in the NRA, Ferguson has been labeled by some as supporting gun control. This claim most likely stems from a proposed filibuster in which Ferguson did not participate, on a gun control bill. According to Ferguson and others, the bill would have easily defeated the filibuster in its original form, leaving gun rights advocates with no concessions. This led to criticism from NRA spokesman Greg Costa in 2002.

== Election results ==
=== 2002 ===
2002 Maryland State Senate Republican primary, District 4
Party	Candidate	Votes	%
Republican	David R. Brinkley	5,559	52.8
Republican	Timothy R. Ferguson	4,005	38.1
Republican	David P. Gray	958	9.1

=== 1998 ===
1998 Maryland State Senate, District 4
Party	Candidate	Votes	%
Republican	Timothy R. Ferguson	18,978	55
Democratic	George Hayes Littrell Jr.	15,656	45

=== 1994 ===
1994 Maryland State Senate, District 4
Party	Candidate	Votes	%
Republican	Timothy R. Ferguson	15,975	52
Democratic	George Hayes Littrell Jr.	14,496	48
