= Charles E. Barkley =

American politician

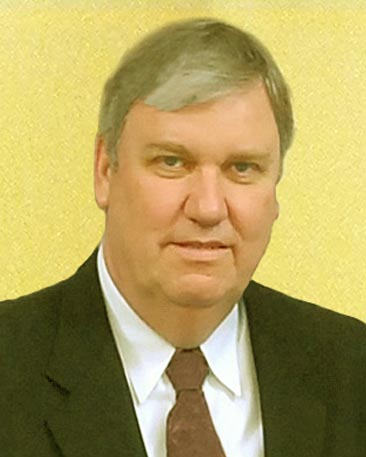

Member of the Maryland House of Delegates from the 39th district
- In office January 13, 1999 – January 9, 2019
- Preceded by: W. Raymond Beck and Mathew Mossburg
- Succeeded by: Lesley Lopez

Personal details
- Born: October 16, 1950 (age 75) Elkins, West Virginia, U.S.
- Party: Democratic
- Education: Towson University (BS); Western Maryland College (MEd)
- Occupation: Teacher

Charles E. "Charlie" Barkley (born October 16, 1950) is an American politician from Maryland and a member of the Democratic Party. He served five terms in the Maryland House of Delegates, representing Maryland's District 39 in Montgomery County. He served on the Economic Matters Committee and as Chair of the Montgomery County Delegation.

Born in Elkins, West Virginia on October 16, 1950, Barkley graduated from Towson State University with a Bachelor of Science degree in education. He later earned a Master of Education degree in Administration from Western Maryland College. Barkley was active in educational advocacy throughout his career, and is a former Vice President of the Montgomery County Education Association. He has remained active on education issues throughout his time in the Assembly.

== Career ==
=== Legislative Notes ===
- Voted in favor of in-state tuition for undocumented immigrants in 2007 (HB6)

== Election results ==
- 2006 Race for Maryland House of Delegates – 39th District

Voters to choose three:

Name	Votes	Percent	Outcome
Nancy J. King, Democratic	18,651	23.5%	Won
Charles E. Barkley, Democratic	18,253	23.0%	Won
Saqib Ali, Democratic	16,455	20.7%	Won
David Nichols, Republican	9,278	11.7%	Lost
Gary Scott, Republican	8,363	10.4%	Lost
Bill Witham, Republican	8,244	10.4%	Lost

- 1994 Race for Maryland House of Delegates – District 39

Voters to choose three:

Name	Votes	Percent	Outcome
Mathew Mossburg, Rep.	13,119	17%	Won
Barrie S. Ciliberti, Rep.	12,897	16%	Won
W. Raymond Beck, Rep.	12,311	16%	Won
Charles E. Barkley, Dem.	12,137	15%	Lost
Anise Key Brown, Dem.	10,987	14%	Lost
Anthony J. Santangelo, Dem.	10,939	14%	Lost
Patricia Cummings, Ind.	6,471	8%	Lost
