= Jennifer Dougherty =

American politician

Jennifer P. Dougherty

Mayor of Frederick, Maryland
- In office January 12, 2002 – January 12, 2006
- Preceded by: James S. Grimes
- Succeeded by: William J. Holtzinger

Personal details
- Born: April 13, 1961 (age 65) Alexandria, Virginia, U.S.
- Party: Democratic (before 2013); Unaffiliated (since 2013)
- Education: Mount Saint Mary's University
- Occupation: Small Business Owner, Realtor

Jennifer P. Dougherty (born April 13, 1961) was elected Frederick, Maryland's first female mayor in 2001. Dougherty defeated 2-term incumbent Republican Mayor James S. Grimes.

Dougherty campaigned for re-election in 2005 but did not win the Democratic primary, losing to opponent Ron Young. Dougherty and Young both ran bitter, negative campaigns in which each attacked the other.

Dougherty was the Democratic nominee for Maryland's 6th congressional district in 2008.

== Early life and education ==
Dougherty graduated from Georgetown Visitation Preparatory School in Washington, D.C.. She later graduated from Mount Saint Mary's University in 1983 with a BA in History, magna cum laude. While a student at The Mount, Dougherty was a 4-year varsity field hockey player. She is the only person in The Mount's Athletic Hall of Fame honored for field hockey. Dougherty also wrote for The Mountain Echo, The Mount's official campus-wide newspaper, for 4 years, serving as editor-in-chief in her senior year.

== Career ==
Dougherty operated Jennifer's Restaurant on West Patrick Street (opened 1987; closed 2008) and Dougherty's Irish Shop (1999–2006). She also served on the Board of Directors of Heartly House, the Frederick County Chamber of Commerce President (1999), and the Rotary Club of Carroll Creek. More recently in December 2009, Dougherty and partner Bruce Rhoderick opened Magoo's Pub and Eatery on West Second Street in Frederick.

== Congressional campaign ==
On November 19, 2007, Dougherty filed to run for Maryland's 6th congressional district. She won the primary and was the Democratic candidate for congress in 2008 against 8-term Republican Roscoe Bartlett. Bartlett defeated Dougherty in the general election.

== Subsequent mayoral campaigns ==
Dougherty announced in 2009 that she would again seek the office of mayor of the City of Frederick, but lost in the primary to newcomer Jason Judd. Dougherty has remained visible in Frederick politics and has recently filed a bid for the 2017 mayoral election.

In 2013, Jennifer Dougherty announced that she was running for mayor of Frederick as an independent candidate. The election was held on November 5. Dougherty lost, garnering 19.43 percent of the vote to Democratic nominee Karen Young's 31.59 percent and incumbent Republican Mayor Randy McClement's 48.75 percent.

== Electoral history ==
Year	Office	Election	Winner	Party	Votes	%	Opponent	Party	Votes	%	Opponent	Party	Votes	%
2008	Congress, 6th district	General	Roscoe Bartlett	Republican	176,062	58.18	Jennifer Dougherty	Democratic	116,455	38.48	Gary Hoover	Libertarian	10,101	3.34
2009	Mayor of Frederick, Maryland	Primary	Jason Judd	Democratic	1,672	58.65	Jennifer Dougherty	Democratic	1003	35.18	Chris Simpson	Democratic	176	6.17
2013	Mayor of Frederick, Maryland	General	Randy McClement	Republican	3,714	48.75	Karen Young	Democratic	2,407	31.59	Jennifer Dougherty	Unaffiliated	1,480	19.43
