= Maryland Department of Labor =

Government agency in Maryland

Agency overview
- Formed: July 1, 1995; 31 years ago (as Department of Labor, Licensing, and Regulation)
- Headquarters: 100 South Charles Street, Tower I Baltimore, Maryland, U.S. 21201
- Agency executives: Portia Wu, Secretary of Labor; Jason Perkins-Cohen, Deputy Secretary; Devki Virk, Commissioner of Labor & Industry; Antonio Salazar, Esq., Commissioner of Financial Regulation; John C. Dove, Jr, Commissioner of Occupational and Professional Licensing; George P. Mahoney, Jr., Commissioner of Racing; Rachel Torres, Assistant Secretary for Unemployment Insurance; Erin J. Roth, Assistant Secretary for Workforce Development & Adult Learning
- Child agencies: Office of the Deputy Secretary (includes the Board of Appeals and the Lower Appeals Division, among others); Division of Labor and Industry; Financial Regulation; Division of Occupational and Professional Licensing; Division of Racing; Division of Unemployment Insurance; Division of Workforce Development and Adult Learning
- Website: www.labor.maryland.gov

The Maryland Department of Labor (called the Department of Labor, Licensing, and Regulation until 2019) is a government agency in the U.S. state of Maryland. It is headquartered at 100 South Charles Street, Tower I in Baltimore.

== History ==
Today's Department of Labor can trace its history to the labor rights movements of the late 19th century. In 1884, the Maryland state government created the Bureau of Statistics and Information to collect information on labor problems and abuses, which were reported annually to the General Assembly.

In 1902, the Assembly directed the Bureau to begin operating a free employment agency. In 1916, the Bureau was renamed the State Board of Labor and Statistics and given new duties: mediating labor disputes and enforcing laws governing hours of work and the employment of women and minors. Renamed the Department of Labor and Industry in 1945, it continued to gather statistics and run the employment agency, but its focus gradually shifted towards regulating labor conditions, including issuing work certificates to minors.

In 1970, a general reorganization of the state government's executive branch pulled labor-related functions—including the agency that had overseen Maryland's unemployment compensation since 1936—into a new Department of Employment and Social Services. In 1983, labor functions were hived off into a new Department of Employment and Training—which just four years later was downgraded to a division and swept into the Department of Economic and Employment Development.

The 1970 reorganization also produced the Department of Licensing and Regulation, the result of consolidating more than 30 state agencies and boards that licensed or regulated various businesses, professions, and trades. In 1995, DLR absorbed the Division of Employment and Training and was renamed the Department of Labor, Licensing, and Regulation.

In 2019, it was renamed the Department of Labor.

=== Secretaries ===
Secretaries of the department, which has been known as Licensing and Regulation (L&R); Labor, Licensing, and Regulation (LLR), and Labor, include:

- Frederick L. Dewberry, Secretary of L&R, 1984–86
- William A. Fogle, Jr., Secretary of L&R, 1987–94
- Frank W. Stegman, Secretary of L&R, 1995
- Eugene A. Conti, Jr., Secretary of LLR, 1995–98
- John P. O'Connor, Secretary of LLR, 1999–2003
- James D. Fielder, Jr., Secretary of LLR, 2003–07
- Thomas E. Perez, Secretary of LLR, 2007–2009
- Alexander M. Sanchez, Secretary of LLR, 2009–12
- Scott R. Jensen, Interim Secretary of LLR, 2012
- Leonard J. Howie III, Secretary of LLR, 2012–2015
- Kelly M. Schulz, Secretary of LLR, 2015–2019
- James Rzepkowski, Assistant Secretary of LLR, 2015–2019; Acting Secretary of LLR, Jan. 2019–June 2019; Acting Secretary of Labor, July 2019; Assistant Secretary of Labor, Aug. 2019–present.
- Tiffany P. Robinson, Secretary of Labor, 2019–2023.
- Portia Wu, Secretary of Labor, 2023–present

== Organization ==
The Maryland Department of Labor includes the following divisions:

=== Offices of the Secretary and the Deputy Secretary ===
- Board of Appeals (2nd. level of appeal of unemployment insurance cases)
- Lower Appeals Division (first level of appeal in unemployment insurance cases)
- Administration
- Communications and Media Relations
- Counsel
- Fair Practices
- General Services
- Information Technology
- Legislative and Regulatory Affairs
- Policy Development
- Program Analysis & Audit
- Small Business Regulatory Assistance

=== Division of Labor and Industry ===

- Employment Standards, Wage & Hour
- Maryland Occupational Safety and Health (MOSH)
- Prevailing Wage, Living Wage, Worker Classification Protection
- Safety Inspection
  - Amusement ride inspection
  - Boiler and pressure vessel safety inspection
  - Elevator safety inspection
  - Railroad safety and health
  - Building Codes Administration

=== Office of Financial Regulation ===
- Administration
- Bank Supervision
- Bank Corporate Activities
- Enforcement and Complaints
- Licensing – Nondepository Institutions
- Mortgage Compliance – Nondepository Institutions
- Policy – Nondepository Institutions

=== Division of Occupational and Professional Licensing ===
- State Board of Architects
- State Athletic Commission
- State Board of Barbers
- Office of Cemetery Oversight
- State Board of Cosmetologists
- State Board of Master Electricians
- State Board for Professional Engineers
- State Board of Stationary Engineers
- State Board of Foresters
- State Board of Heating, Ventilation, Air-Conditioning, and Refrigeration Contractors
- Maryland Home Improvement Commission
- State Board of Certified Interior Designers
- State Board for Professional Land Surveyors
- State Board of Examiners of Landscape Architects
- State Board of Pilots
- State Board of Plumbing
- State Board of Public Accountancy
- State Real Estate Commission
- State Commission of Real Estate Appraisers and Home Inspectors
- State Board of Individual Tax Preparers
- Licensure of secondhand precious metal object dealers and pawnbrokers
- Licensure of sports agents

=== Division of Racing ===
- Maryland Racing Commission

=== Division of Unemployment Insurance ===
The Division of Unemployment Insurance makes the initial decision on unemployment benefit claims. Appeals are handled in the Lower Appeals Division and the Board of Appeals, under the Office of the Deputy Secretary.

- Benefits and Special Programs Section
- Contributions
- Policy and Planning Unit

=== Division of Workforce Development & Adult Learning ===
- Workforce Development oversees the State’s workforce programs. Working with Local Workforce Investment Areas, services include matching job seekers and employers, providing training, and reporting on the needs and demands of the labor market.
- Adult Education and Literacy Services, which also includes Correctional Education, offers adult instructional services and GED testing for people who are at least 16 years old and not enrolled in school. Programs are offered in all Maryland jurisdictions and provide classes for English-language learners and adults who want to improve their reading, writing, and math skills, or who want to earn a high school diploma through the GED tests or the Maryland National External Diploma Program (NEDP).
  - The Adult Education, Adult Correctional Education, and GED programs were moved from the Maryland State Department of Education (MSDE).
