= Kasich =

Kasich (Belarusian: Касіч, Russian: Касич, Ukrainian: Касич) is an East Slavic language surname.

Notable people with the surname include:

- John Kasich (born 1952), American politician, author, and television news host
- Karen Waldbillig Kasich (born 1963), American business executive and wife of former Governor of Ohio
