= David E. Vogt III =

American politician

David Vogt
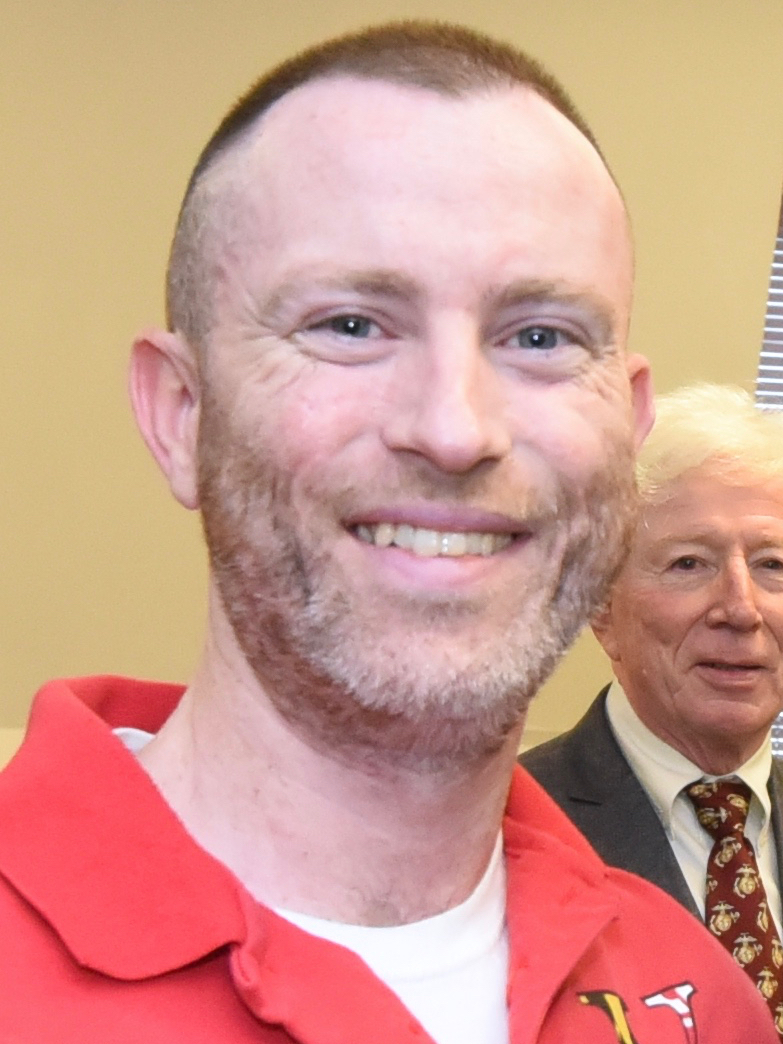
- Vogt in 2017

Member of the Maryland House of Delegates from the 4th district
- In office January 14, 2015 – January 9, 2019
- Preceded by: Donald B. Elliott
- Succeeded by: Dan Cox

Personal details
- Born: David Edward Vogt III; 1984 (age 41–42) Tampa, Florida, U.S.
- Party: Republican
- Children: 2
- Education: University of Maryland, College Park (BA); American Military University (MA)

Military service
- Branch/service: United States Marine Corps
- Years of service: 2004–2012
- Battles/wars: War in Afghanistan

David Edward Vogt III (born 1984) is an American politician who served as a member of the Maryland House of Delegates for the 4th district from 2015 to 2019.

== Early life and education ==
Vogt was born in Tampa, Florida. He attended the University of South Florida from 2002 to 2004 and later earned a Bachelor of Arts degree in English from the University of Maryland, College Park in 2009. In 2013, he earned a Master of Arts degree in science and governance studies from American Military University.

== Career ==
From 2004 to 2012, Vogt served as a legal specialist in the United States Marine Corps. During his military service, he was deployed to Afghanistan. After leaving the Marines, Vogt worked as a restaurant manager. He was elected to the Maryland House of Delegates in November 2014 and assumed office in January 2015. Vogt was a candidate for Maryland's 6th congressional district in the 2016 election, placing fifth in the Republican primary.
