= Roscoe Bartlett =

American politician (born 1926)

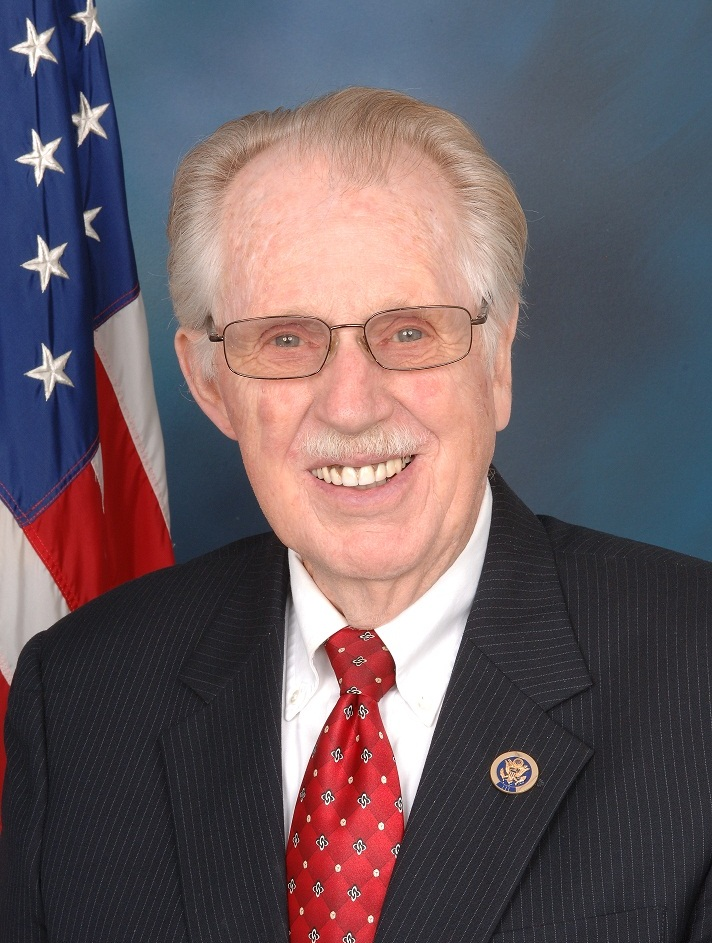
- Official portrait, 2009

Member of the U.S. House of Representatives from Maryland's 6th district
- In office January 3, 1993 – January 3, 2013
- Preceded by: Beverly Byron
- Succeeded by: John Delaney

Personal details
- Born: Roscoe Gardner Bartlett Jr. June 3, 1926 (age 100) Moreland, Kentucky, U.S.
- Party: Republican
- Spouse: Ellen Bartlett
- Children: 10, including Joseph
- Education: Washington Adventist University (BS); University of Maryland, College Park (MS, PhD)
- Bartlett's voice Bartlett supporting Dana Rohrabacher's amendment to the Omnibus Patent Act of 1997. Recorded April 17, 1997

Roscoe Gardner Bartlett Jr. (born June 3, 1926) is an American politician who served as a member of the United States House of Representatives from 1993 to 2013. He is a member of the Republican Party and was a member of the Tea Party Caucus. At the end of his tenure in Congress, Bartlett was the second-oldest serving member of the House of Representatives, behind fellow Republican Ralph Hall of Texas. Bartlett is the oldest living former U.S. representative, following the death of G. William Whitehurst in November 2026.

== Early life and education ==
Bartlett was born in Moreland, Jefferson County, Kentucky, on June 3, 1926, to Martha Minnick and Roscoe Gardner Bartlett. He completed his early education in a one-room schoolhouse. He attended Columbia Union College (now Washington Adventist University) in Takoma Park, Maryland, affiliated with the Seventh-day Adventist Church, and graduated in 1947 with a Bachelor of Science in theology and biology and a minor in chemistry. He had intended to be a Seventh-day Adventist minister, but he was considered too young for the ministry after receiving his bachelor's degree at the age of 21.

Bartlett was encouraged to attend postgraduate education at the University of Maryland, College Park. He studied anatomy, physiology, and zoology, earning a master's degree in physiology in 1948. Bartlett was then hired as a faculty member of the university and taught anatomy, physiology and zoology while working towards his Doctor of Philosophy in physiology, which he earned in 1952. His academic career included lecturing at Loma Linda University School of Medicine, also affiliated with the Seventh-day Adventist Church, in Loma Linda, California (1952–1954), and serving as an assistant professor at Howard University College of Medicine in Washington, D.C. from 1954 to 1956.

== Political career ==
=== Elections ===
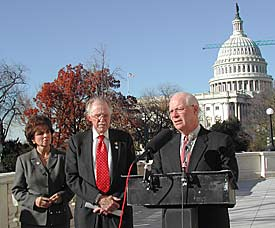
Rep. Bartlett (center) (R-MD) joined Sen. Ben Cardin (podium) (D-MD) and Rep. Jo Ann Davis (left) (R-VA) in calling for a study of homeland security needs of the National Capital region, including Maryland, Virginia, and the District of Columbia.

1980

In 1980, Bartlett ran for a seat in the U.S. Senate. In the Republican primary, he ranked fourth with 7% of the vote, losing to incumbent Charles Mathias, who won the primary with 55% of the vote.

1982

In 1982, Bartlett ran for Congress in Maryland's 6th congressional district against incumbent Democratic U.S. representative Beverly Byron. He won the Republican primary with 52% of the vote. In the general election, Byron defeated him 74%–26%.

1992

Bartlett ran again in the newly redrawn 6th congressional district and won the Republican primary with 42% of the vote. Byron was upset by a somewhat more liberal Democrat, State Delegate Thomas Hattery, in the Democratic primary. Many conservative Democrats switched their support to Bartlett in November, as he defeated Hattery 54%–46%.

1994–2006

During this time period, Bartlett repeatedly won re-election with at least 56% of the vote.

2008

According to the Frederick News-Post, Bartlett had under-reported property sales by over $1 million since 2004 on his official financial disclosure forms, and made $299,000 in unreported loans in order to sell his daughter's home, over which he exercised power of attorney. Bartlett said that the under-reporting was an oversight and that he was a "bit player" in the real estate transactions.

2010

As the lone Republican in Maryland's congressional delegation, Bartlett won reelection in 2010 at the age of 84. On June 1, 2009, Democrat and Iraq war veteran Andrew Duck formally announced a campaign for Congressman Bartlett's seat.

2012

Bartlett's district was significantly altered in redistricting plans released in October 2011, which was described as gerrymandering. The new district lines shifted the district slightly to the south, adding some heavily Democratic territory closer to Washington DC.

Specifically, the redistricting plan shifted a mostly Republican section of Frederick County and an even more heavily Republican section of Carroll County to the heavily Democratic 8th district. It also lost heavily Republican sections of Harford and Baltimore counties, as well as another section of Carroll, to the already heavily Republican 1st district. In their place, the legislature added a heavily Democratic section of Montgomery County. While John McCain carried the old 6th with 57 percent of the vote, Barack Obama would have carried the reconfigured 6th with 56 percent of the vote.

Bartlett faced Democrat John Delaney and Libertarian Nickolaus Mueller in his bid for reelection.

In 2012, the Federal Election Commission fined Bartlett $5,000 for repeatedly failing to submit accurate campaign finance disclosure reports. Bartlett hired an accountant to address any outstanding disclosure issues.

When fellow member of the House of Representatives Todd Akin made inappropriate comments about female biology, Bartlett immediately repudiated them, adding "There is no room in politics for these types of statements...As a human physiologist I know there is no scientific backing to Todd's claims." He said his view on abortion exceptions has been "the same for twenty years. I'm pro-life, with exceptions for the life of the mother, rape and incest...I'm so avidly pro-life I'm against corporal punishment", later adding that a very small proportion of abortions are a result of rape; however, in 2001 Bartlett had supported a constitutional amendment which did not include the rape and incest exceptions. "The Maryland Democratic Party went after Bartlett", trying to connect Todd Akin's comments to Bartlett.

Bartlett was heavily defeated in the general election by Delaney, taking only 38 percent of the vote to Delaney's 59 percent.

=== Tenure ===
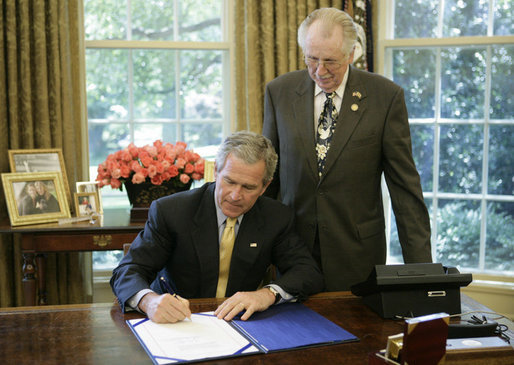
Bartlett watches as President George W. Bush signs the Freedom to Display the American Flag Act of 2005 in July 2006

In November 1997, Bartlett was one of eighteen Republicans in the House to co-sponsor a resolution by Bob Barr that sought to launch an impeachment inquiry against President Bill Clinton. The resolution did not specify any charges or allegations. This was an early effort to impeach Clinton, predating the eruption of the Clinton–Lewinsky scandal, which ultimately lead to the impeachment of Clinton in 1998. On October 8, 1998, Bartlett voted in favor of legislation that was passed to open an impeachment inquiry. On December 19, 1998, Bartlett voted in favor of all four proposed articles of impeachment against Clinton (two of which received the needed majority of votes to pass).

In 1993, Bartlett voted against the North American Free Trade Agreement Implementation Act.

In August 2011, Bartlett wrote an op-ed in The New York Times calling for an end to invasive research on primates. Bartlett, who had previously conducted research on primates in connection with the U.S. space program, joined with Senator Maria Cantwell in introducing the Great Ape Protection and Cost Savings Act. It is estimated to save the federal government $300 million over the next 10 years, if passed.

Press reports indicate that Bartlett's political action committee is named Because All Responsible Taxpayers Like Every Truth Told PAC, or BARTLETT PAC for short.

Press reports indicate Bartlett was instrumental in arranging House hearings on the dangers of an electromagnetic pulse attack on the United States.

Bartlett was against a 2012 Senate bill to fund the United States Postal Service with an additional 33 billion dollars, calling it an "irresponsible bailout"—though he does claim to support "... maintaining next day delivery standards in rural areas that would keep the Cumberland mail processing facility open."

Bartlett believes in the geologic theory of Peak Oil, and predicts that "the end of cheap oil and natural gas is coming and coming fast" as increasing global demand for energy overwhelms production. In 2005, Bartlett established the Congressional Peak Oil Caucus with Rep. Tom Udall of New Mexico. Bartlett has argued that federal revenues from offshore oil and gas production should be invested in developing renewable energies.

At a town hall meeting in September 2012, Bartlett claimed that federal student loans were unconstitutional and that disregarding the Constitution was a "very slippery slope" towards an event like the Holocaust. Bartlett later apologized for his remarks.

=== Committee assignments ===
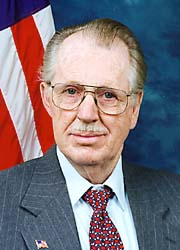
Earlier photo of Congressman Bartlett.

- Committee on Armed Services
  - Subcommittee on Tactical Air and Land Forces (Chair)
  - Subcommittee on Seapower and Projection Forces
- Committee on Science, Space and Technology
  - Subcommittee on Research and Science Education
  - Subcommittee on Energy and the Environment
- Committee on Small Business
  - Subcommittee on Agriculture, Energy and Trade

=== Caucus memberships ===
- Peak Oil Caucus (Founding member)
- Liberty Caucus
- Republican Study Committee
- Republican Main Street Partnership
- Tea Party Caucus
- Congressional Caucus on Turkey and Turkish Americans
- Congressional Immigration Reform Caucus

== Electoral history ==
| Year | Office | Election | Subject | Party | Votes | % | Opponent | Party | Votes | % | Opponent | Party | Votes | % |
|---|---|---|---|---|---|---|---|---|---|---|---|---|---|---|
| 1982 | Congress, 6th district | General | Roscoe Bartlett | Republican | 35,321 | 25.61 | Beverly Byron | Democratic | 102,596 | 74.39 | | | | |
| 1992 | Congress, 6th district | General | Roscoe Bartlett | Republican | 125,564 | 54.13 | Thomas Hattery | Democratic | 106,224 | 45.79 | | | | |
| 1994 | Congress, 6th district | General | Roscoe Bartlett | Republican | 122,809 | 65.95 | Paul Muldowney | Democratic | 63,411 | 34.05 | | | | |
| 1996 | Congress, 6th district | General | Roscoe Bartlett | Republican | 132,853 | 56.83 | Stephen Crawford | Democratic | 100,910 | 43.16 | | | | |
| 1998 | Congress, 6th district | General | Roscoe Bartlett | Republican | 127,802 | 63.42 | Timothy McCown | Democratic | 73,728 | 36.58 | | | | |
| 2000 | Congress, 6th district | General | Roscoe Bartlett | Republican | 168,624 | 60.65 | Donald DeArmon | Democratic | 109,136 | 39.25 | | | | |
| 2002 | Congress, 6th district | General | Roscoe Bartlett | Republican | 147,825 | 66.11 | Donald DeArmon | Democratic | 75,575 | 33.8 | | | | |
| 2004 | Congress, 6th district | General | Roscoe Bartlett | Republican | 206,076 | 67.38 | Kenneth Bosley | Democratic | 90,108 | 29.46 | | | | |
| 2006 | Congress, 6th district | General | Roscoe Bartlett | Republican | 141,200 | 58.97 | Andrew Duck | Democratic | 92,030 | 38.43 | Robert Kozak | Green | 6,095 | 2.55 |
| 2008 | Congress, 6th district | General | Roscoe Bartlett | Republican | 176,062 | 58.18 | Jennifer Dougherty | Democratic | 116,455 | 38.48 | Gary Hoover | Libertarian | 10,101 | 3.34 |
| 2010 | Congress, 6th district | General | Roscoe Bartlett | Republican | 144,520 | 61.80 | Andrew Duck | Democratic | 76,963 | 32.90 | Dan Massey | Libertarian | 6,611 | 2.80 |
| 2012 | Congress, 6th district | General | Roscoe Bartlett | Republican | 110,842 | 38.2 | John Delaney | Democratic | 169,303 | 58.4 | Nickolaus Mueller | Libertarian | 9,383 | 3.2 |

== Personal life ==
Bartlett and his wife Ellen have 10 children (of whom one, Joseph R. Bartlett, is a former member of the Maryland House of Delegates), 17 grandchildren, and 2 great-grandchildren. Following his defeat for re-election, Bartlett decided with his wife to live "off-the-grid" in the West Virginia mountains. Their cabin lacks electricity, phone service, and municipal plumbing. He became a senior consultant for Lineage Technologies, a cyber security group that seeks to protect supply chains.

Bartlett is a vegetarian and does not drink alcohol or smoke. He also grows his own organic vegetables.

Bartlett is a member of the Seventh-day Adventist Church.

Bartlett turned 100 on June 3, 2026.

U.S. House of Representatives
| Preceded by Beverly Byron | Member of the U.S. House of Representatives from Maryland's 6th congressional district 1993–2013 | Succeeded by John Delaney |
Honorary titles
| Preceded by G. William Whitehurst | Oldest living United States Representative; Sitting or Former; 2026–present | Current holder |
U.S. order of precedence (ceremonial)
| Preceded by Mike Capuano as Former U.S. Representative | Order of precedence of the United States as Former U.S. Representative | Succeeded by Michael McNulty as Former U.S. Representative |
