= Joseph R. Bartlett =

American politician (born 1969)

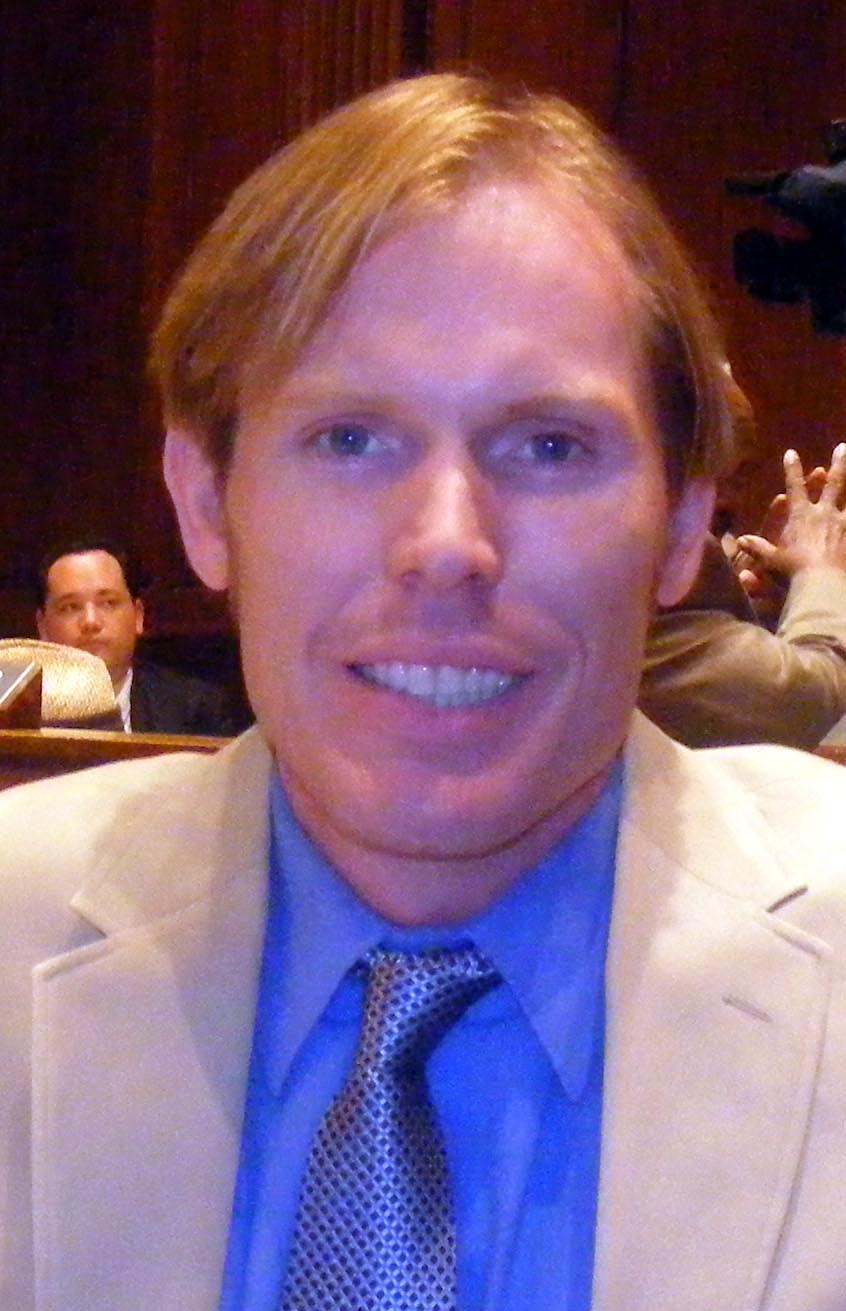

Member of the Maryland House of Delegates from the 4A district
- In office January 8, 2003 – January 12, 2011 Serving with Paul S. Stull (R)
- Preceded by: redistricted
- Succeeded by: Kathy Afzali (R)

Member of the Maryland House of Delegates from the 3rd district
- In office January 13, 1999 – January 8, 2003 Serving with Sue Hecht (D), Louise Virginia Snodgrass (R)
- Preceded by: J. Anita Stup (R)
- Succeeded by: redistricted

Personal details
- Born: December 30, 1969 (age 56) Takoma Park, Maryland, U.S.
- Party: Republican
- Spouse: Katie Hopkins
- Parent(s): Roscoe Bartlett; Ellen L. Bartlett
- Education: Frostburg State University (BS)
- Profession: Residential Real Estate Investor

Joseph R. Bartlett (born December 30, 1969) is an American politician and real estate investor who served as a member of the Maryland House of Delegates for District 4A from 1999 to 2011.

== Early life and education ==
Bartlett was born on December 30, 1969, in Takoma Park, Maryland, the son of then-future Congressman Roscoe Bartlett. Bartlett earned an Associate of Arts degree from Frederick Community College in 1992, followed by a Bachelor of Science degree in Business Administration from Frostburg State University in 1994.

== Career ==
In 1994 and 1996, Bartlett served as a campaign manager for his father's re-election campaigns.

Bartlett was elected to the Maryland House of Delegates in November 1998, succeeding J. Anita Stup. He served from January 1999 until January 2011, and opting not to run for re-election in 2010. After leaving office in 2011, he established Bartlett Real Estate Solutions, a real estate firm.

== Lodging controversy ==
In 2010, Bartlett drew criticism for using taxpayer money to pay his girlfriend's rent during the 2008, 2009, and 2010 legislative sessions. In total, the state had paid $31,923 for rent. Bartlett said that he was not dating Katharine Hopkins when he began renting from her in 2008, and that he cleared the housing arrangement with a legislative ethics attorney when the two started dating. The controversy eventually led Bartlett to announce he would not run for re-election to a fourth term on July 6, 2010. In August 2010, Maryland House Speaker Michael E. Busch called for tighter rules on lodging expenses following the controversy.

== Personal life ==
Bartlett is a practicing Christian and lived in Middletown, Maryland, as of the last update to his Vote Smart biography.

== Electoral history ==
Maryland House of Delegates District 3 Republican Primary Election, 1998
Party	Candidate	Votes	%
Republican	Louise V. Snodgrass	6,125	31
Republican	Joseph R. Bartlett	5,770	30
Republican	William M. Castle	4,290	22
Republican	Timothy Brooks	3,273	17

Maryland House of Delegates District 3 Election, 1998
Party	Candidate	Votes	%
Republican	Louise V. Snodgrass	19,196	21
Democratic	C. Sue Hecht	17,968	19
Republican	Joseph R. Bartlett	15,784	17
Republican	William M. Castle	15,251	17
Democratic	Richard L. Stup	13,191	14
Democratic	David P. Koontz	10,858	12

Maryland House of Delegates District 4A Republican Primary Election, 2002
Party	Candidate	Votes	%
Republican	Paul S. Stull	17,765	39.5
Republican	Joseph R. Bartlett	16,545	36.8
Republican	Louise V. Snodgrass	10,519	23.4

Maryland House of Delegates District 4A Election, 2002
Party	Candidate	Votes	%
Republican	Paul S. Stull	16,830	36.3
Republican	Joseph R. Bartlett	14,720	31.7
Democratic	Valerie Moore Dale	7,399	15.9
Democratic	Dick Franklin	6,001	12.9
Republican	Louise Snodgrass (write-in)	1,472	3.2
Write-in		0	0.0

Maryland House of Delegates District 4A Election, 2006
Party	Candidate	Votes	%
Republican	Paul S. Stull	17,765	39.5
Republican	Joseph R. Bartlett	16,545	36.8
Democratic	Maggi Margaret Hays	10,519	23.4
Write-in		140	0.3
