= 2024 Maryland Question 1 =

Voter referendum

- November 5, 2024
- Declaration of Rights - Right to Reproductive Freedom

Results
Choice	Votes	%
Yes	2,199,319	76.06%
No	692,219	23.94%
Valid votes	2,891,538	100.00%
Invalid or blank votes	0	0.00%
Total votes	2,891,538	100.00%
Registered voters/turnout	4,204,572	72.84%

Yes
90–100%
80–90%
70–80%
60–70%
50–60%
No
60–70%
50–60%
Other
Tie
No votes

Question 1 was a voter referendum that appeared on the ballot on November 5, 2024. It established in the Constitution of Maryland a right to reproductive freedom. The referendum was approved overwhelmingly, with more than three times as many voters voting in favor of it than against it, and only losing in Garrett County.

== Ballot measure ==
The ballot measure reads as follows:

Question 1
Constitutional Amendment

The proposed amendment confirms an individual's fundamental right to reproductive freedom, including, but not limited to, the ability to make and effectuate decisions to prevent, continue, or end the individual's pregnancy, and provides that the State may not, directly or indirectly, deny, burden, or abridge the right, unless justified by a compelling State interest achieved by the least restrictive means.

The choices read as follows:

For the Constitutional Amendment
Against the Constitutional Amendment

== History ==
In 1992, Maryland voters approved Question 6, which upheld a state law to codify Roe v. Wade and guaranteed the right to an abortion, with 62 percent of voters approving the measure and 38 percent opposed.

In August 2018, Speaker of the Maryland House of Delegates Michael E. Busch endorsed efforts to codify the right to an abortion into the state constitution, citing fears that the U.S. Supreme Court would overturn its ruling in Roe v. Wade and Planned Parenthood v. Casey, which held that the U.S. Constitution protected a woman's right to have an abortion. Republican Governor Larry Hogan, who personally opposes abortion, expressed support for the measure, but also questioned if a constitutional amendment to codify abortion protections was necessary. During the 2019 legislative session, Busch introduced legislation to create a 2020 referendum on enshrining abortion protects into the state constitution, but he withdrew it early into the session after Senate President Thomas V. Miller Jr. said he was reluctant to move it forward, following protests against late-term abortion bills in New York and Virginia.

In May 2019, following the election of Adrienne A. Jones as House Speaker, and after the Alabama General Assembly passed the Human Life Protection Act, Jones said she would continue Busch's efforts to enshrine abortion protection into the state constitution. As the Supreme Court began considering Dobbs v. Jackson Women's Health Organization in 2022, she introduced legislation to create a referendum on codifying abortion rights, which passed the Maryland House of Delegates by a 93–42 vote, but the bill died in the Maryland Senate after Senate President Bill Ferguson declined to put it up for a vote. The legislature also passed the Abortion Care Access Act, which provided $3.5 million toward clinical training for reproductive services, which became law after lawmakers overrode Governor Hogan's veto on the bill.

In June 2022, after the Supreme Court ruled in Dobbs, and overturned Roe and Casey, Jones committed to re-introducing the bill during the 2023 legislative session. The court's ruling also made relevant the issue of abortion in the 2022 Maryland gubernatorial election, with all Democratic candidates promising to support Jones' measure; Republican candidate Kelly Schulz said that she was "personally pro-life", but would not change "current Maryland law" toward abortion if elected governor, while her challenger, far-right state delegate Dan Cox, celebrated the Dobbs decision and vowed to end taxpayer funding for abortions as governor.

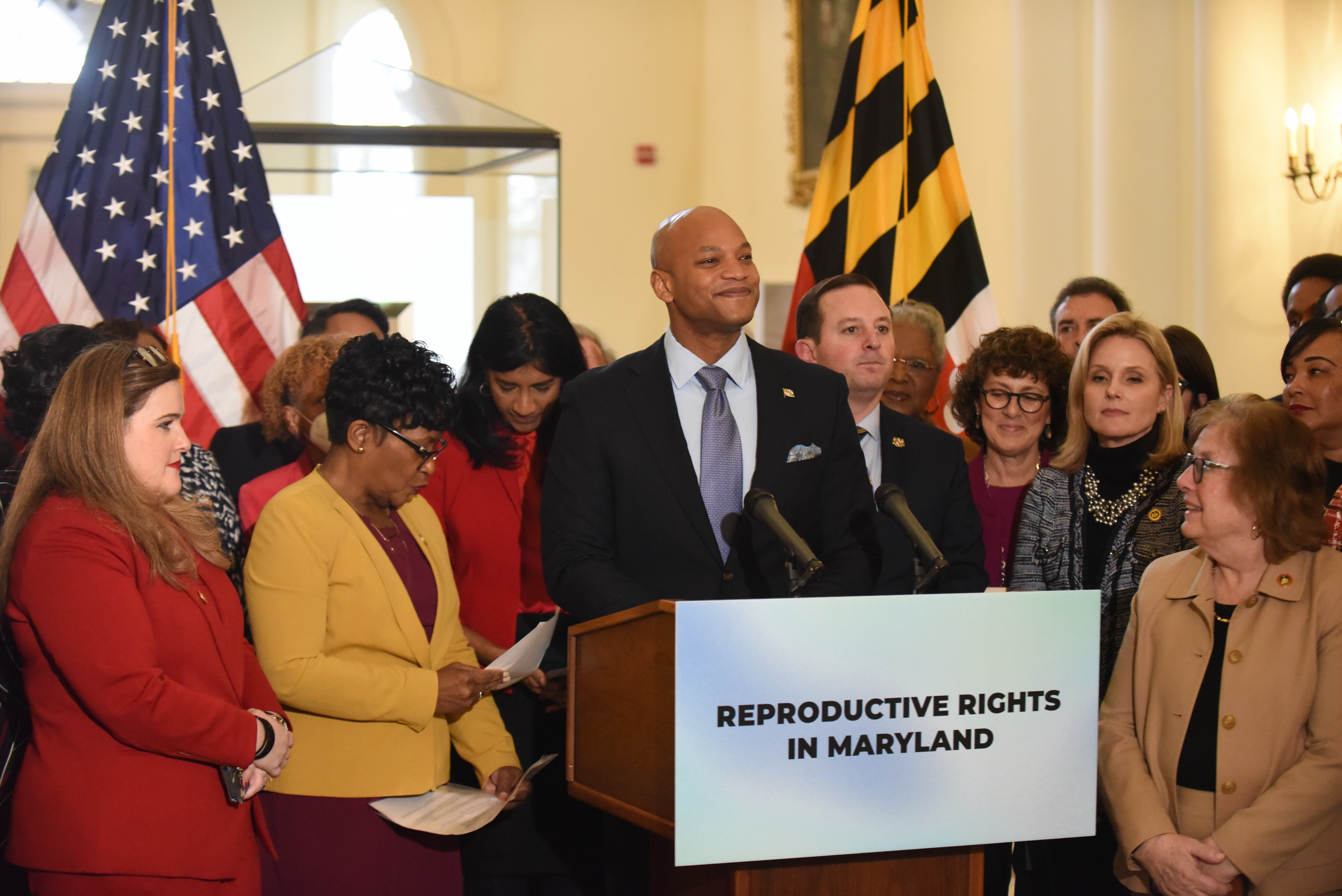
Governor Wes Moore holds a press conference to endorse bills protecting abortion rights, 2023

During the 2023 legislative session, Jones again introduced legislation to enshrine abortion protections into the state constitution, which passed, and was signed into law by Governor Wes Moore, along with a package of bills to protect patients who come to Maryland seeking abortion rights from out-of-state criminal prosecution.

=== House vote ===
The amendment was approved by the House on March 10, 2023, with 99 yeas, 37 nays, and 4 absent delegates. Before the vote, Republicans unsuccessfully sought to amend the bill, with state delegate William J. Wivell introducing two amendments to give constitutional protections to the "preborn" and another replacing the phrase "reproductive freedom" with "abortion", and state delegate April Fleming Miller introducing an amendment replacing the word "person" with "woman"; all three amendments were defeated in party-line votes.

Map of the vote Democratic yea (99) Democratic absentees (2) Republican nay (37) Republican absentees (2) Vacant seat (1)

House of Delegates
Party	Votes for	Votes against	Absent
Democratic (102)	99: Gabriel Acevero; Jackie Addison; Nick Allen; Tiffany Alston; Marlon Amprey; Dalya Attar; Vanessa Atterbeary; Heather Bagnall; Ben Barnes; Darryl Barnes; J. Sandy Bartlett; Kumar Barve; Harry Bhandari; Adrian Boafo; Regina T. Boyce; Tony Bridges; Jon Cardin; Mark S. Chang; Lorig Charkoudian; Nick Charles; Luke Clippinger; Frank M. Conaway Jr.; Brian M. Crosby; Charlotte Crutchfield; Bonnie Cullison; Debra Davis; Eric Ebersole; Mark Edelson; Elizabeth Embry; Kris Fair; Jessica Feldmark; Diana M. Fennell; Linda Foley; Cathi Forbes; David Fraser-Hidalgo; Brooke Grossman; Michele Guyton; Pam Guzzone; Kevin Harris; Andrea Harrison; Anne Healey; Shaneka Henson; Terri Hill; Marvin E. Holmes Jr.; Julian Ivey; Carl W. Jackson; Andre Johnson Jr.; Steven Johnson; Adrienne A. Jones; Dana Jones; Anne Kaiser; Aaron Kaufman; Ken Kerr; Marc Korman; Mary A. Lehman; Jazz Lewis; Robbyn Lewis; Jeffrie Long Jr.; Lesley Lopez; Sara N. Love; Ashanti Martinez; Aletheia McCaskill; Bernice Mireku-North; David Moon; Julie Palakovich Carr; Cheryl Pasteur; Edith J. Patterson; Joseline Peña-Melnyk; N. Scott Phillips; Andrew Pruski; Lily Qi; Pamela Queen; Kirill Reznik; Mike Rogers; Samuel I. Rosenberg; Sheila Ruth; Sheree Sample-Hughes; Emily Shetty; Karen Simpson; Stephanie M. Smith; Jared Solomon; Dana Stein; Vaughn Stewart; Deni Taveras; Kym Taylor; Jennifer Terrasa; Karen Toles; Veronica Turner; Kris Valderrama; Joe Vogel; Courtney Watson; Melissa Wells; Jennifer White Holland; Jheanelle Wilkins; Nicole A. Williams; C. T. Wilson; Jamila Woods; Chao Wu; Natalie Ziegler	–	2: Gary Simmons; Caylin Young
Republican (39)	–	37: Christopher T. Adams; Carl Anderton Jr.; Steven J. Arentz; Lauren Arikan; Terry Baker; Christopher Bouchat; Jason C. Buckel; Brian Chisholm; Barrie Ciliberti; Jefferson L. Ghrist; Robin Grammer Jr.; Mike Griffith; Wayne A. Hartman; Jim Hinebaugh; Kevin Hornberger; Seth A. Howard; Tom Hutchinson; Jay Jacobs; Robert B. Long; Nino Mangione; Susan K. McComas; Ric Metzgar; April Fleming Miller; Matthew Morgan; Todd Morgan; Rachel Muñoz; Ryan Nawrocki; Charles J. Otto; Jesse Pippy; Teresa E. Reilly; April Rose; Stuart Schmidt Jr.; Joshua Stonko; Kathy Szeliga; Chris Tomlinson; William Valentine; William J. Wivell	2: Mark N. Fisher; Nic Kipke
Total (140) (Note: At the time of the vote, District 16 had one vacancy.)	99	37	4

=== Senate vote ===
The amendment was approved by the Senate on March 31, 2023, with 33 yeas and 14 nays. Republican state senator Bryan Simonaire introduced an amendment to ban abortions after fetal viability, which failed by a vote of 13–33, and another amendment to the Senate crossfile version of the bill that would exclude gender-affirming surgery for minors without parental consent under the bill's definition of reproductive freedom, which was rejected by a vote of 14–32.

Map of the vote Democratic yea (33) Democratic nay (1) Republican nay (13)

Senate
Party	Votes for	Votes against	Abstentions
Democratic (34)	33: Malcolm Augustine; Pamela Beidle; Joanne C. Benson; Benjamin Brooks; Jill P. Carter; Sarah Elfreth; Arthur Ellis; Brian Feldman; Bill Ferguson; Dawn Gile; Melony G. Griffith; Guy Guzzone; Antonio Hayes; Katie Fry Hester; Shelly L. Hettleman; Mary-Dulany James; Cheryl Kagan; Ariana Kelly; Nancy J. King; Kathy Klausmeier; Benjamin F. Kramer; Clarence Lam; Karen Lewis Young; Cory McCray; C. Anthony Muse; James Rosapepe; William C. Smith Jr.; Charles E. Sydnor III; Jeff Waldstreicher; Alonzo T. Washington; Mary L. Washington; Ron Watson; Craig Zucker	1: Michael Jackson	–
Republican (13)	–	13: Jack Bailey; Mary Beth Carozza; Paul D. Corderman; William Folden; Jason C. Gallion; Steve Hershey; J. B. Jennings; Johnny Mautz; Mike McKay; Justin Ready; Johnny Ray Salling; Bryan Simonaire; Chris West	–
Total (47)	33	14	0

== Campaign ==
Question 1 was supported by Freedom in Reproduction — Maryland, which was made up of leaders from organizations including Planned Parenthood Maryland, the Baltimore Abortion Fund, and the Women's Law Center of Maryland. It was opposed by Health Not Harm MD, which was chaired by Deborah Brocato, a lobbyist for Maryland Right to Life. After President Joe Biden withdrew from the 2024 United States presidential election, supporters of Question 1 reported an increase in people interested in volunteering for efforts to support the ballot initiative. As of October 2024, pro-Question 1 groups have outraised and outspent the referendum's opponents 5-to-1.

Abortion access is widely popular in Maryland, and, as such, an intense campaign focused on Question 1 similar to the one advocates faced in 1992 was considered to be unlikely. The amendment's opponents claimed that its passage would allow children to receive gender-affirming care without their parents' consent; the amendment's supporters, including former Maryland First Lady Katie O'Malley, have called this a misinterpretation of the amendment's language, saying that it would only apply to issues like abortion, birth control, and In vitro fertilisation.

The issue of abortion became a key issue in the concurrent 2024 United States Senate election in Maryland, in which Democratic nominee Angela Alsobrooks heavily criticized Republican nominee Larry Hogan for his 2022 veto of the Abortion Care Access Act. Despite this, both candidates said they would vote for Question 1.

=== Endorsements ===
Yes

U.S. Executive Branch officials

- John King Jr., 10th United States Secretary of Education (2016–2017) (Democrat)
- April McClain Delaney, former NTIA deputy administrator (2022–2023) (Democrat)

U.S. Senators

- Chris Van Hollen, Maryland (2017–present) (Democrat)

U.S. Representatives

- Jamie Raskin, MD-08 (2017–present) (Democrat)

Statewide elected officials

- Peter Franchot, 33rd Comptroller of Maryland (2007–2023) (Democrat)
- Doug Gansler, 45th Attorney General of Maryland (2007–2015) (Democrat)
- Larry Hogan, 62nd Governor of Maryland (2015–2023) (Republican)
- Brooke Lierman, 34th Comptroller of Maryland (2023–present) (Democrat)
- Aruna Miller, 10th Lieutenant Governor of Maryland (2023–present) (Democrat)
- Wes Moore, 63rd Governor of Maryland (2023–present) (Democrat)

State senators

- Bill Ferguson, 86th President of the Maryland Senate (2020–present) from the 46th district (2011–present) (Democrat)
- Dawn Gile, state senator from the 33rd district (2023–present) (Democrat)
- Don Harmon, President of the Illinois Senate (2020–present) from the 39th district (2003–present) (Democrat)
- Shelly Hettleman, state senator from the 11th district (2020–present) (Democrat)
- Dana Jones, state delegate from district 30A (2020–present) (Democrat)
- Ariana Kelly, state senator from the 16th district (2023–2024) (Democrat)
- Jeff Waldstreicher, state senator from the 18th district (2019–present) (Democrat)
- Mary L. Washington, state senator from the 43rd district (2019–present) (Democrat)

State delegates

- Adrienne A. Jones, Speaker of the Maryland House of Delegates (2019–present) from the 10th district (1997–present) (Democrat)
- Joseline Peña-Melnyk, state delegate from the 21st district (2007–present) (Democrat)
- Lily Qi, state delegate from the 15th district (2019–present) (Democrat)
- Samuel I. Rosenberg, state delegate from the 41st district (1983–present) (Democrat)

County officials

- All 11 members of the Montgomery County Council (Democrat)
- Angela Alsobrooks, Prince George's County Executive (2018–2024) (Democrat)
- Marc Elrich, Montgomery County Executive (2018–present) (Democrat)
- Johnny Olszewski, Baltimore County Executive (2018–2025) (Democrat)

Municipal officials

Party officials

- Yvette Lewis, former chair of the Maryland Democratic Party (2011–2015, 2019–2023) (Democrat)
- Tom Perez, former chair of the Democratic National Committee (2017–2021), former U.S. Secretary of Labor (2013–2017), and former Maryland Secretary of Labor (2007–2009) (Democrat)

Individuals

- Dawn Moore, First Lady of Maryland (2023–present) (Democrat)
- Katie O'Malley, First Lady of Maryland (2007–2015) (Democrat)
- Mini Timmaraju, president of Reproductive Freedom for All (2021–present)

Organizations

- Freedom From Religion Foundation
- Maryland State Education Association
- Planned Parenthood of Maryland
- Reproductive Freedom for All
No

State senators

- Mary Beth Carozza, state senator from the 38th district (2019–present) (Republican)
- Steve Hershey, Minority Leader of the Maryland Senate (2023–present) from the 36th district (2013–present) (Republican)
- Justin Ready, state senator from the 5th district (2019–present) (Republican)
- Bryan Simonaire, state senator from the 31st district (2007–present) (Republican)

State delegates

- Lauren Arikan, state delegate from district 7B (2019–present) (Republican)
- Terry Baker, state delegate from district 1C (2023–present) (Republican)
- Jason C. Buckel, Minority Leader of the Maryland House of Delegates (2021–present) from district 1B (2015–present) (Republican)
- Dan Cox, state delegate from the 4th district (2019–2023) (Republican)
- Richard Impallaria, state delegate from the 7th district (2003–2023) (Republican)
- Ryan Nawrocki, state delegate from district 7A (2023–present) (Republican)
- Neil Parrott, state delegate from district 2A (2011–2023) (Republican)
- Teresa Reilly, state delegate from district 35A (2019–present) (Republican)
- April Rose, state delegate from the 5th district (2019–present) (Republican)
- Kathy Szeliga, state delegate from district 7A (2011–present) (Republican)

Individuals

- Wilton Daniel Gregory, archbishop of the Archdiocese of Washington (2019-2025)
- William Edward Koenig, bishop of the Diocese of Wilmington (2021-present)
- William E. Lori, archbishop of the Archdiocese of Baltimore (2012-present)
- Gloria Purvis, Catholic pro-life activist

Organizations

- Democrats for Life of Maryland
- Maryland Family Institute
- Maryland Right to Life

== Opinion polls ==
Poll source	Date(s) administered	Sample size (Note: Key: A – all adults RV – registered voters LV – likely voters V – unclear)	Margin of error	For	Against	Other/ Undecided
YouGov (Note: Poll sponsored by the University of Maryland, College Park.)	October 23–27, 2024	500 (LV)	± 5.2%	75%	18%	7% (Note: 1% with "Would not vote on this ballot measure")
University of Maryland, Baltimore County	September 23–28, 2024	862 (LV)	± 3.3%	69%	21%	10%
OpinionWorks	October 20–23, 2022	982 (LV)	± 3.1%	71%	19%	11%
University of Maryland	September 22–27, 2022	810 (RV)	± 4.0%	78%	16%	5%

== Results ==
2024 Maryland Question 1
Choice	Votes	%
For	2,199,319	76.06
Against	692,219	23.94
Total	2,891,538	100.00

Source: Maryland State Board of Elections

=== By county ===
By county

Breakdown of voting by county
County	Yes		No		Margin		TotalVotes
County	#	%	#	%	#	%	TotalVotes
Allegany	16,783	55.19%	13,625	44.81%	3,158	10.39%	30,408
Anne Arundel	216,940	72.89%	80,683	27.11%	136,257	45.78%	297,623
Baltimore City	188,398	86.50%	29,407	13.50%	158,991	73.00%	217,805
Baltimore	300,431	76.56%	91,985	23.44%	208,446	53.12%	392,416
Calvert	33,783	65.62%	17,700	34.38%	16,083	31.24%	51,483
Caroline	9,300	59.65%	6,290	40.35%	3,010	19.31%	15,590
Carroll	59,926	60.70%	38,793	39.30%	21,133	21.41%	98,719
Cecil	31,251	64.30%	17,350	35.70%	13,901	28.60%	48,601
Charles	69,395	77.91%	19,671	22.09%	49,724	55.83%	89,066
Dorchester	10,718	67.59%	5,140	32.41%	5,578	35.17%	15,858
Frederick	102,787	68.65%	46,937	31.35%	55,850	37.30%	149,724
Garrett	6,773	44.81%	8,342	55.19%	-1,569	-10.38%	15,115
Harford	97,082	66.70%	48,465	33.30%	48,617	33.40%	145,547
Howard	139,939	79.37%	36,365	20.63%	103,574	58.75%	176,304
Kent	7,773	72.58%	2,937	27.42%	4,836	45.15%	10,710
Montgomery	404,351	82.35%	86,641	17.65%	317,710	64.71%	490,992
Prince George's	335,057	87.83%	46,419	12.17%	288,638	75.66%	381,476
Queen Anne's	19,647	63.44%	11,322	36.56%	8,325	26.88%	30,969
St. Mary's	35,907	63.81%	20,362	36.19%	15,545	27.63%	56,269
Somerset	5,463	57.57%	4,027	42.43%	1,436	15.13%	9,490
Talbot	14,992	67.56%	7,199	32.44%	7,793	35.12%	22,191
Washington	43,011	62.96%	25,305	37.04%	17,706	25.92%	68,316
Wicomico	29,420	64.71%	16,042	35.29%	13,378	29.43%	45,462
Worcester	20,192	64.30%	11,212	35.70%	8,980	28.60%	31,404
Total	2,199,319	76.06%	692,219	23.94%	1,507,100	52.12%	2,891,538

=== By congressional district ===
"Yes" won all eight congressional districts, including one that elected a Republican.

District	Yes	No	Representative
1st	65%	35%	Andy Harris
2nd	74%	26%	Dutch Ruppersberger (118th Congress)
2nd	74%	26%	Johnny Olszewski (119th Congress)
3rd	75%	25%	John Sarbanes (118th Congress)
3rd	75%	25%	Sarah Elfreth (119th Congress)
4th	87%	13%	Glenn Ivey
5th	77%	23%	Steny Hoyer
6th	68%	32%	David Trone (118th Congress)
6th	68%	32%	April McClain Delaney (119th Congress)
7th	84%	16%	Kweisi Mfume
8th	83%	17%	Jamie Raskin

== See also ==
- Abortion in Maryland
- 1992 Maryland Question 6
- Initiatives and referendums in the United States
- 2022 Kansas abortion referendum
- 2022 California Proposition 1
- 2022 Michigan Proposal 3
- 2022 Vermont Proposal 5
- November 2023 Ohio Issue 1
- 2024 Arizona Proposition 139
- 2024 Colorado Amendment 79
- 2024 Florida Amendment 4
- 2024 Missouri Amendment 3
- 2024 Montana Initiative 128
- 2024 Nebraska Initiative 439
- 2024 Nevada Question 6
- 2024 New York Proposal 1
- 2024 South Dakota Amendment G
- 2024 United States ballot measures
- 2026 Idaho Proposition 1
- 2026 Missouri Amendment 3
- 2026 Nevada Question 6
- 2026 Virginia Question 1
