= Walter M. Baker =

American politician (1927–2012)

Member of the Maryland Senate
- In office January 8, 1979 – January 8, 2003
- Preceded by: Elroy G. Boyer (34th); Joseph J. Long Sr. (36th)
- Succeeded by: Catherine Riley (34th); E. J. Pipkin (36th)
- Constituency: 34th district (1979–1983); 36th district (1983–2003)

Personal details
- Born: September 23, 1927 Port Deposit, Maryland, U.S.
- Died: April 17, 2012 (aged 84) Newark, Delaware, U.S.
- Party: Democratic
- Education: Washington College (B.A.); University of Maryland School of Law (LL.B.)

Military service
- Allegiance: United States
- Branch/service: United States Army
- Years of service: 1950–1953

Walter M. Baker (September 23, 1927 – April 17, 2012) was first elected to the Maryland Senate in 1979. He represented District 36, which covered Caroline, Cecil, Kent, Queen Annes's, and Talbot counties.

== Education ==
Baker earned his B.A. from Washington College in 1960. He attended the University of Maryland School of Law, LL.B., graduating in 1960.

== Career ==
Baker served in the United States Army from 1950 to 1953. After college, he was admitted to the Maryland Bar in 1960. He served as an attorney before being elected as a State Senator in 1979. He was defeated in 2003 by E. J. Pipkin.

== Election results ==
- 2002 Race for Maryland State Senate – District 36

Name	Votes	Percent	Outcome
E. J. Pipkin, Rep.	24,827	62.5%	Won
Walter M. Baker, Dem.	14,898	37.5%	Lost
Other Write-Ins	27	0.1%	Lost

- 1998 Race for Maryland State Senate – District 36

Name	Votes	Percent	Outcome
Walter M. Baker, Dem.	18,517	58%	Won
Allaire D. Williams, Rep.	13,650	42%	Lost

- 1994 Race for Maryland State Senate – District 36

Name	Votes	Percent	Outcome
Walter M. Baker, Dem.	17,981	98%	Won
Janice L. Graham, Dem.	302	2%	Lost

- 1990 Race for Maryland State Senate – District 36

Name	Votes	Percent	Outcome
Walter M. Baker, Dem.	14,431	100%	Won

- 1986 Race for Maryland State Senate – District 36

Name	Votes	Percent	Outcome
Walter M. Baker, Dem.	12,204	58%	Won
Bernard M. Hopkins, Rep.	8,778	42%	Lost
