= Steve Hershey =

American politician (born 1964)

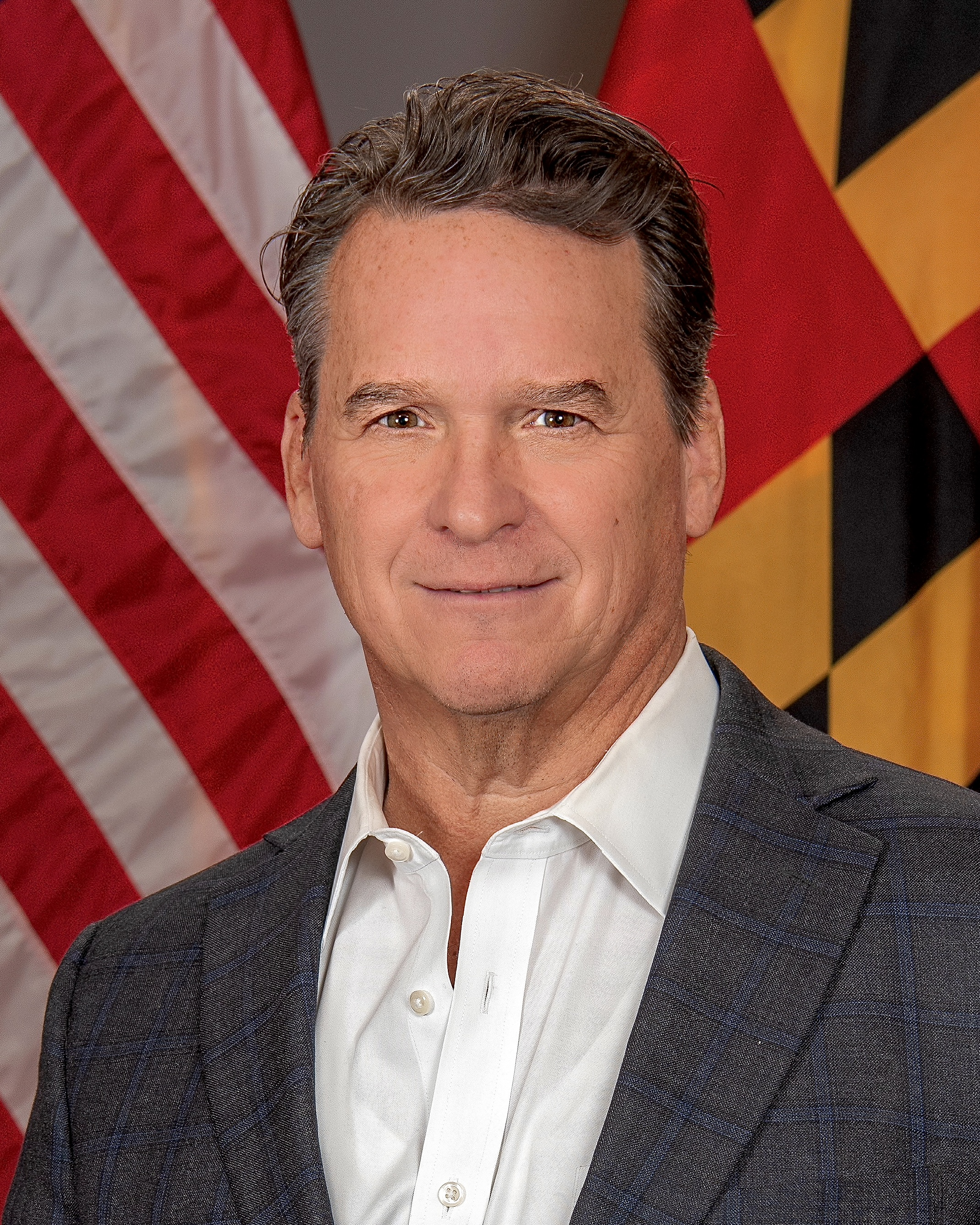
- Hershey in 2024

Minority Leader of the Maryland Senate
- Incumbent
- Assumed office January 11, 2023
- Whip: Justin Ready
- Preceded by: Bryan Simonaire

Member of the Maryland Senate from the 36th district
- Incumbent
- Assumed office October 1, 2013
- Appointed by: Martin O'Malley
- Preceded by: E.J. Pipkin

Member of the Maryland House of Delegates from the 36th district
- In office January 12, 2011 – October 1, 2013
- Preceded by: Richard A. Sossi
- Succeeded by: Steven J. Arentz

Personal details
- Born: May 2, 1964 (age 62) Washington, D.C., U.S.
- Party: Republican
- Education: James Madison University (attended); Catholic University (BS); George Washington University (MBA)
- Hershey's voice Hershey on the Dobbs decision and the Abortion Care Access Act; Recorded June 26, 2022

Stephen S. Hershey Jr. (born May 2, 1964) is an American politician who has served as a member of the Maryland Senate from District 36 since 2013, and as the minority leader of the Maryland Senate since January 11, 2023. A member of the Republican Party, he previously represented the district in the Maryland House of Delegates from 2011 to 2013.

Born in Washington, D.C. and raised in Prince George's County, Maryland, Hershey graduated from Catholic University of America and George Washington University. He began his career in project management and commercial real estate before joining the administration of Governor Bob Ehrlich, where he worked for the Maryland Department of Planning and the Maryland Department of Natural Resources. Hershey was elected to the Maryland House of Delegates in 2010 after defeating incumbent state delegate Richard A. Sossi in the Republican primary election for the 36th district, and was appointed to the Maryland Senate in 2013 following the resignation of state senator E. J. Pipkin. In 2023, Hershey was elected as the minority leader of the Maryland Senate.

== Early life and education ==
Hershey was born in Washington, D.C. to father Steve Hershey, a sportswriter for USA Today and The Washington Star, and mother Gail Hershey. He was raised in Prince George's County, Maryland, where he graduated from Bowie High School. Hershey later attended James Madison University and graduated from Catholic University of America, earning a Bachelor of Civil Engineering degree in 1987, and George Washington University in 2002 with a Master of Business Administration degree. Hershey moved to Queen Anne's County in 1996.

== Early career ==
Hershey was a principal in Hershey Management Group, an independent real estate consulting firm, and later held positions at Planet Hollywood and Prime Retail. He worked as a vice president for project management for the Trammell Crow Company from 1999 to 2003, afterwards serving as a member of the Queen Anne's County Economic Development Commission until 2006. Following the election of Governor Bob Ehrlich, Hershey worked as an assistant secretary for the Maryland Department of Planning from 2003 to 2004, and assistant secretary for land and water recreation at the Maryland Department of Natural Resources from 2004 to 2006. Afterwards, Hershey served as the vice president of Jones Lang LaSalle from 2006 to 2023, and as the vice president of TECfusions since 2023.

Hershey first got involved in politics in 2002 as the president of the Queen Anne's County Republican Club. That year, he unsuccessfully ran for the Queen Anne's County Board of Commissioners in District 2, losing to Rodney Niedomanski in the Republican primary.

== Maryland General Assembly ==
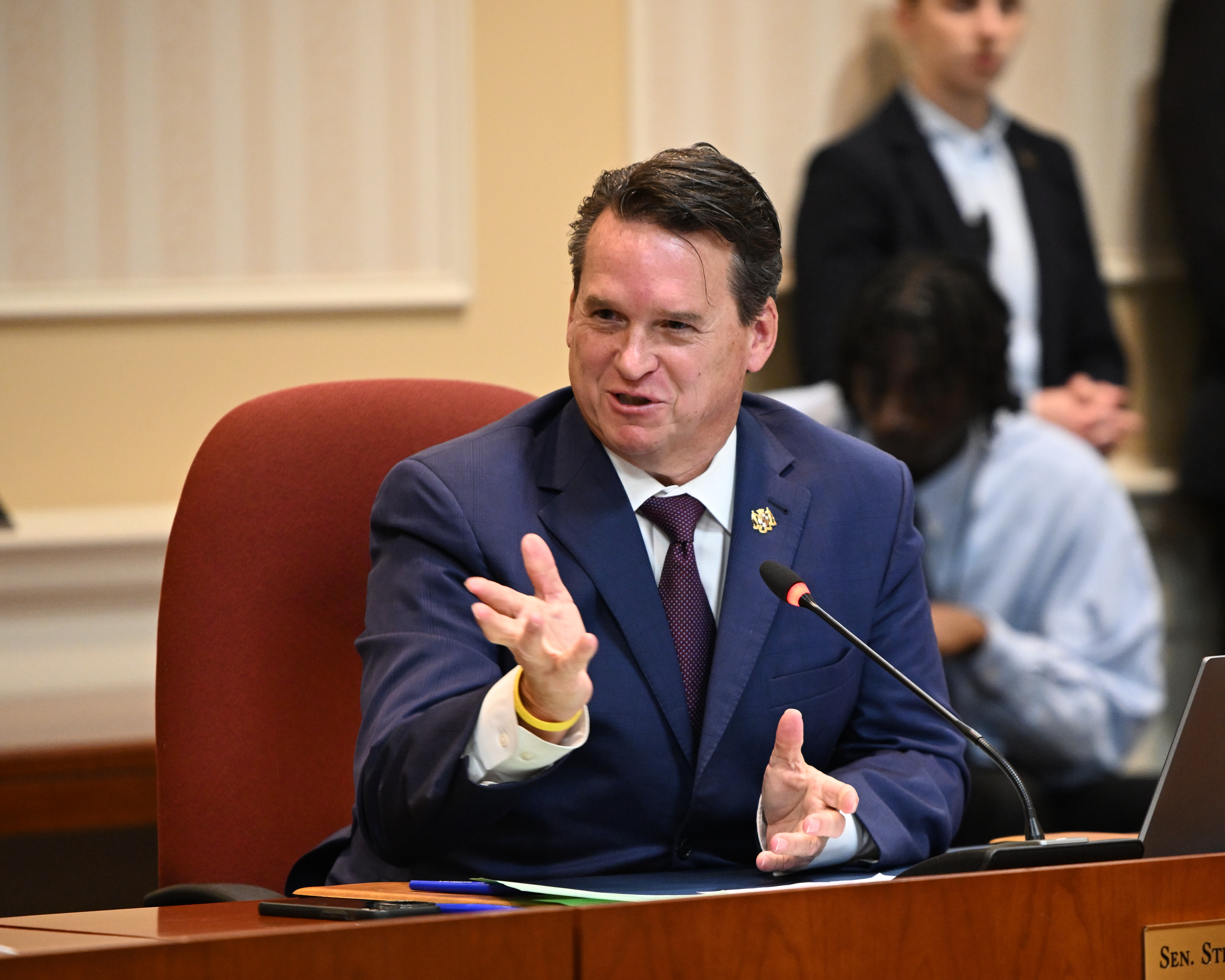
Hershey in the Senate Finance Committee, 2023

In 2010, Hershey filed to run for the Maryland House of Delegates in District 36, challenging incumbent state delegate Richard A. Sossi. During the Republican primary, he ran on a platform that included cutting taxes and reducing government spending. Hershey won the Republican primary in September 2010, edging out Sossi by 124 votes, or a margin of 1.2 percent, and ran unopposed in the general election. Hershey was sworn into the Maryland House of Delegates on January 12, 2011. He was a member of the Economic Matters Committee during his entire tenure, and served as the Deputy Minority Whip in 2013.

In August 2013, following the resignation of Senate minority leader E. J. Pipkin, Hershey applied to serve the remainder of Pipkin's term in the Maryland Senate. The Republican Central Committees of Caroline and Kent counties voted to nominate him, while the Queen Anne's and Cecil County Republican Central Committees voted to nominate his opponent, Michael D. Smigiel Sr. In September, Governor Martin O'Malley appointed Hershey to the seat over Smigiel, and he was sworn in on October 1.

Hershey served on the Judicial Proceedings Committee from 2013 to 2015, afterwards serving as a member of the Finance Committee. He has also served as a member of the Executive Nominations Committee and the Rules Committee since 2023. In January 2015, Hershey was elected to serve as the Senate minority whip. In this capacity, he worked with the Maryland Republican Party in its unsuccessful "Drive for Five" campaign during the 2018 Maryland Senate election, during which the party won a net gain of one seat. Hershey did not run for re-election to this position in October 2020, and was succeeded by Michael Hough. In November 2022, following the 2022 Maryland Senate election in which Republicans lost two seats, Hershey was elected to serve as the Senate minority leader, replacing Bryan Simonaire. During the 2026 elections, Republicans lost one seat in the Maryland Senate, which Hershey blamed on backlash to data centers in Frederick County. He was re-elected as the Senate minority leader in November 2026.

Hershey ran for a full four-year term in 2014, during which he faced a primary challenge from former state delegate Richard Sossi, whom he defeated with 56 percent of the vote. During his campaign, the Hershey Company filed a lawsuit against Hershey, alleging that he was infringing on the company's trademarked logo design in campaign materials. The company added that Hershey had used its trademarked logo during his 2002 and 2010 campaigns, during which the Hershey Company issued cease and desist orders to stop Hershey from using it. Hershey contested the company's lawsuit, arguing that a ruling for the company would infringe on his constitutional rights. In July 2014, Judge William D. Quarles Jr. ruled for the Hershey Company, issuing a preliminary injunction prohibiting Hershey from using the infringing campaign signs.

In September 2025, Hershey formed an exploratory committee for a potential 2026 gubernatorial campaign. He ultimately decided against running, filing to run for re-election in February 2026. Hershey defeated Democratic nominee Nivek Johnson in the general election on November 3, 2026.

== Political positions ==
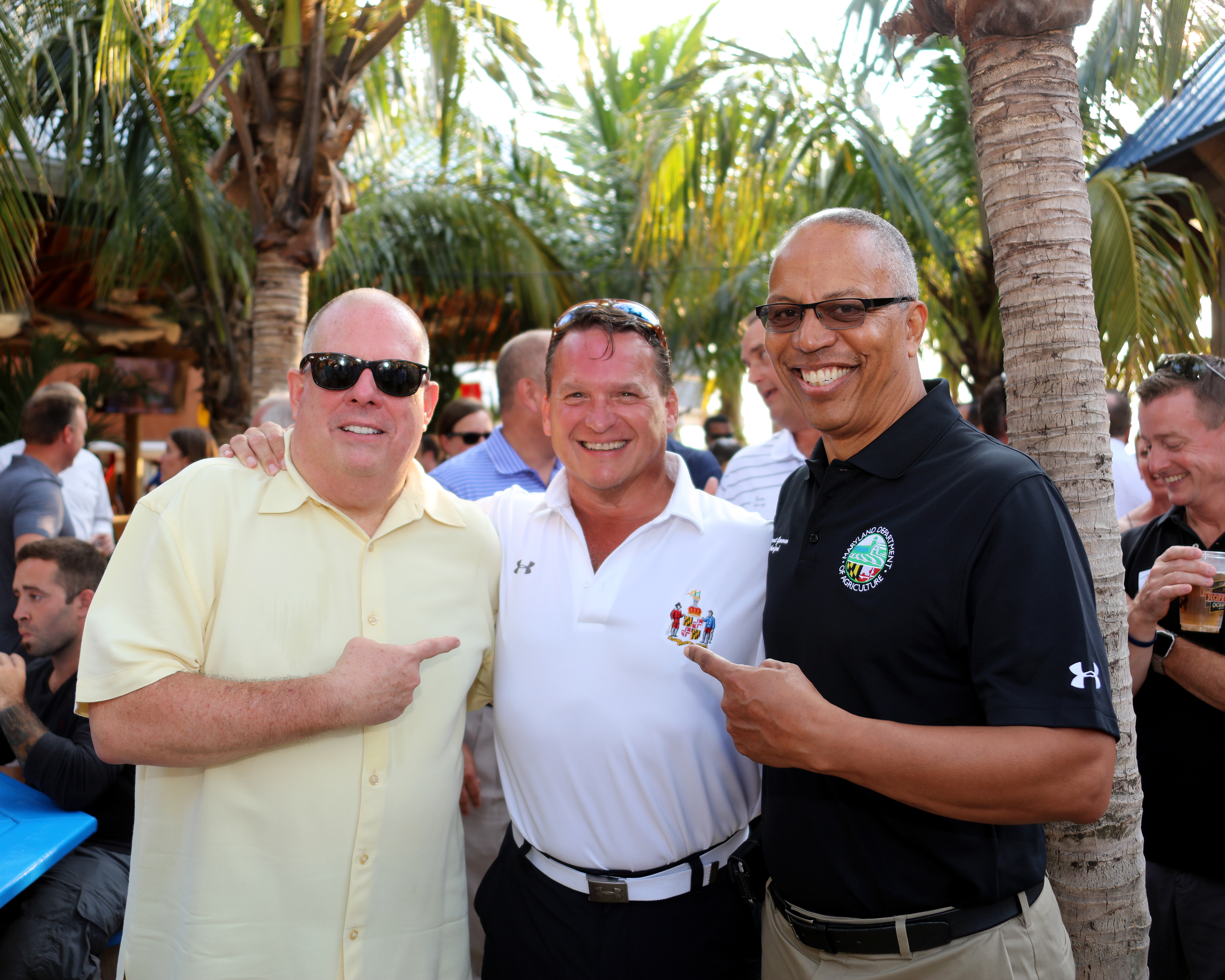
Hershey with Governor Larry Hogan and Lieutenant Governor Boyd Rutherford, 2017

During his 2010 House of Delegates campaign, Hershey described himself as a "fiscal and social conservative whom stands for preserving our Constitution, the principles of an economy based on free enterprise, small limited government and individual responsibilities". In January 2026, The Washington Post described Hershey as a moderate Republican.

=== Agriculture ===
Hershey supports the deregulation of Maryland's farming industry. During the 2015 legislative session, he introduced a bill to reduce penalties for illegal oyster poaching, which passed but did not become law.

=== Crime and policing ===
During his 2002 commissioner campaign, Hershey said he supported creating a liaison position for emergency services in the county.

In 2013, Hershey voted against a bill to abolish the death penalty in Maryland.

In November 2023, ahead of the 2024 legislative session, Hershey introduced a package of "tough on crime" bills, including legislation to increase penalties for gun crimes and to repeal the Juvenile Justice Reform Act, which restricted the state's ability to charge juveniles for most offenses.

=== Education ===
Hershey supports the Broadening Options and Opportunities for Students Today (BOOST) program, which provides state-funded scholarships to low-income students attending private schools, and spoke out against proposals to cut funding for the program in 2023. He opposes the Blueprint for Maryland's Future, describing it as an "unfunded mandate" for the state's education system, and has proposed cutting back spending on the education reform package so that the state only focuses on its most important components. In January 2026, Hershey opposed Governor Wes Moore's proposal to increase funding for education in fiscal year 2027, raising questions about how it would be paid for amid a $1.4 billion budget deficit.

During his 2002 commissioner campaign, Hershey proposed providing tax credits and improving benefits to retain teachers in the county.

In 2019, Hershey opposed a bill that would allow county school boards to set their own academic calendars, reversing an executive order by Governor Larry Hogan that mandated a post-Labor Day start for public schools.

During the 2013 legislative session, Hershey introduced a bill to extend voting rights to the student member of the Kent County Board of Education.

In June 2025, Hershey supported the U.S. Supreme Court's ruling in Mahmoud v. Taylor, which overturned Montgomery County Public Schools's policy of not permitting opt-outs for instruction involving LGBTQ-themed storybooks, calling it a "victory for common sense and for parental rights" and describing the school system's policy as "authoritarian".

=== Environment ===
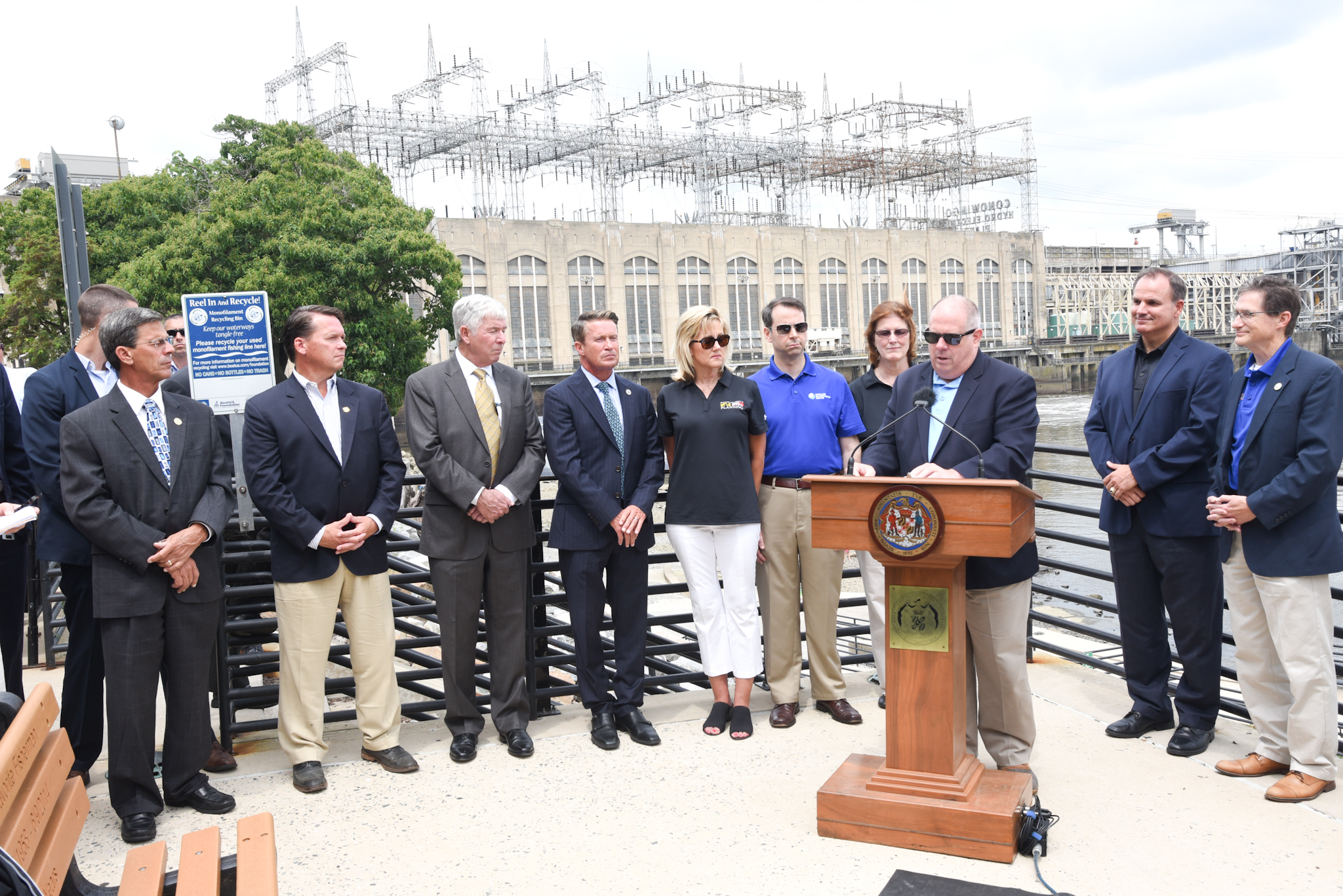
Hershey (far left) attends a press conference at the Conowingo Dam, 2017

In September 2014, Hershey criticized the bay restoration agreement between Maryland and Pennsylvania, saying that it stunted development on the Eastern Shore of Maryland and calling the $15 billion cost associated with cleaning up the Conowingo Dam an "unfunded mandate". He has called the Conowingo Dam one of the largest point sources of nitrogen pollution in the state and supports requiring Exelon, who operates the dam, to dredge the sediment behind the dam to reduce runoff into the Chesapeake Bay.

In 2023, Hershey said he opposed the Clean Trucks Act, a bill that would require the Maryland Department of the Environment to adopt a rule to phase out the sale of medium and heavy-duty gas-powered vehicles in Maryland.

=== Energy ===
In 2015, amid proposals to build a wind farm off the shore of Kent County, Hershey introduced a bill to give the county the authority to veto any large-scale wind project in their jurisdiction. In November 2025, he signed onto a letter criticizing Maryland Attorney General Anthony Brown for becoming involved in litigation over a proposed offshore wind farm project off the coast of Ocean City.

During the 2019 legislative session, Hershey opposed the Clean Energy Jobs Act, which would require half of the state's electricity to come from renewable sources by 2030, and questioned whether the bill would create jobs in Maryland. He later expressed disappointment with Governor Larry Hogan's decision to allow the bill to become law without his signature.

During the 2023 legislative session, Hershey opposed the POWER Act, which increased the state's wind power goals to 8.5 gigawatts, and unsuccessfully sought to amend the bill to prevent its costs from being passed down to consumers. In February 2025, amid rising utility rates, Hershey suggested that Maryland increase its natural gas generation and repeal the state's ban on fracking.

In January 2026, amid a $1.5 billion budget deficit, Hershey called on Governor Wes Moore to cut funding for the Strategic Energy Investment Fund, which is funded by utilities that can pay into the fund in lieu of purchasing renewable energy, to close the state's budget deficit. He also expressed support for allowing Exelon to build new gas-fired power plants in Maryland, but opposes allowing the company to use ratepayer funds to pay for the new generating plants. In April 2026, he opposed the Utility RELIEF Act, an omnibus energy bill backed by Moore and Democratic legislative leaders, saying that the bill doesn't go far enough to cut consumers' electricity bills.

In June 2026, Hershey supported efforts by the second Trump administration to restart the Warrior Run Generating Station coal plant using federal funds, saying that it would lower energy costs in Maryland.

In November 2026, Hershey supported setting statewide guardrails on data centers, but said that counties should make the final decision on whether data centers are allowed and opposed passing a statewide data center moratorium.

=== Fiscal issues ===
Hershey opposes Maryland's "Rain Tax", calling it an "unnecessary burden" for Maryland businesses. During the 2014 legislative session, he introduced a bill that would exempt counties who use "best available technology septic systems" from the rain tax.

During the 2014 legislative session, Hershey voted against a bill to raise the state's minimum wage to $10.10 an hour. In 2019, he voted against a bill to raise it again to $15 an hour, arguing that legislators should instead cut taxes to increase workers' income. In May 2020, amid the COVID-19 pandemic, Hershey called on the Maryland Board of Public Works to freeze the minimum wage at $11 an hour for two years.

During the 2016 legislative session, Hershey supported a measure to provide tax breaks to households that earn more than $150,000 annually, which he claimed represented the state's small business owners. In January 2017, he said he would support allowing citizens initiatives on budgetary matters, including newly imposed taxes. In 2021, Hershey opposed a bill to impose a tax on digital advertising. During the 2023 legislative session, Hershey introduced a bill to eliminate all income taxes for retirees. During debate on a bill to decouple state transit fares from inflation, he introduced an amendment to decouple the state's fuel taxes from inflation, which was rejected in a 27–18 vote. In March 2026, following a spike in gas prices as a result of the 2026 Iran war, Hershey proposed a 30-day gas tax holiday. Despite never introducing the bill to implement the gas tax holiday, Hershey blamed Governor Wes Moore for the proposal failing to pass.

In April 2024, Hershey introduced an amendment to the Renters' Rights and Stabilization Act that allows landlords to deduct the fee for issuing an eviction notice for failure to pay rent from a tenant's security deposit. The amendment was adopted, after which Hershey voted for the bill on final passage.

During the 2025 legislative session, Hershey opposed tax increases to address the state's $3 billion budget deficit, predicting that they would cause Maryland residents and businesses to leave the state for states with better tax climates. In June 2025, he defended the One Big Beautiful Bill Act from Democratic criticisms that the bill would result in hundreds of millions in additional costs to Maryland, instead criticizing Democratic lawmakers in the Maryland General Assembly for passing bills to expand Medicaid and provide support to undocumented immigrants.

In June 2025, Hershey criticized Governor Moore's initiative to give communities affected by racist policies greater access to $400 million in state grants and loans as "wealth redistribution dressed up in equity language" and "socialist".

In November 2025, Hershey criticized Democrats for blaming the economic policy of the second Trump administration for the state's $1.5 billion budget deficit, instead blaming the state's reliance on federal government spending for the shortfall. He later said he supported cutting programs he called non-essential, including the Family and Medical Leave Insurance Act, to address the state's budget deficit.

In March 2026, during debate on the state's budget reconciliation bill, Hershey introduced a bill to repeal the state's IT services tax, citing a report by the Maryland Bureau of Revenue Estimates showing that the tax was underperforming expectations. The amendment failed by a 20–24 vote.

=== Gun policy ===
In January 2013, Hershey participated in a protest outside the Maryland State House against gun control proposals announced by Governor Martin O'Malley, which included licensing for all handguns.

During the 2018 legislative session and following the 2017 Las Vegas shooting, Hershey was one of three Republicans to vote for a bill to ban bump stocks in Maryland.

In 2019, Hershey voted against a bill to abolish the state's Handgun Permit Review Board, which handled conceal carry applications.

In June 2022, Hershey said he supported the U.S. Supreme Court's decision in New York State Rifle & Pistol Association, Inc. v. Bruen. During the 2023 legislative session, he opposed the Gun Safety Act, which banned open carry near schools, government property, construction areas, or entertainment venues, and from entering someone's property while carrying a firearm unless given permission by the owner, calling it "unconstitutional". In September, Hershey celebrated a federal court ruling that struck down certain provisions of the Gun Safety Act.

=== Health care ===
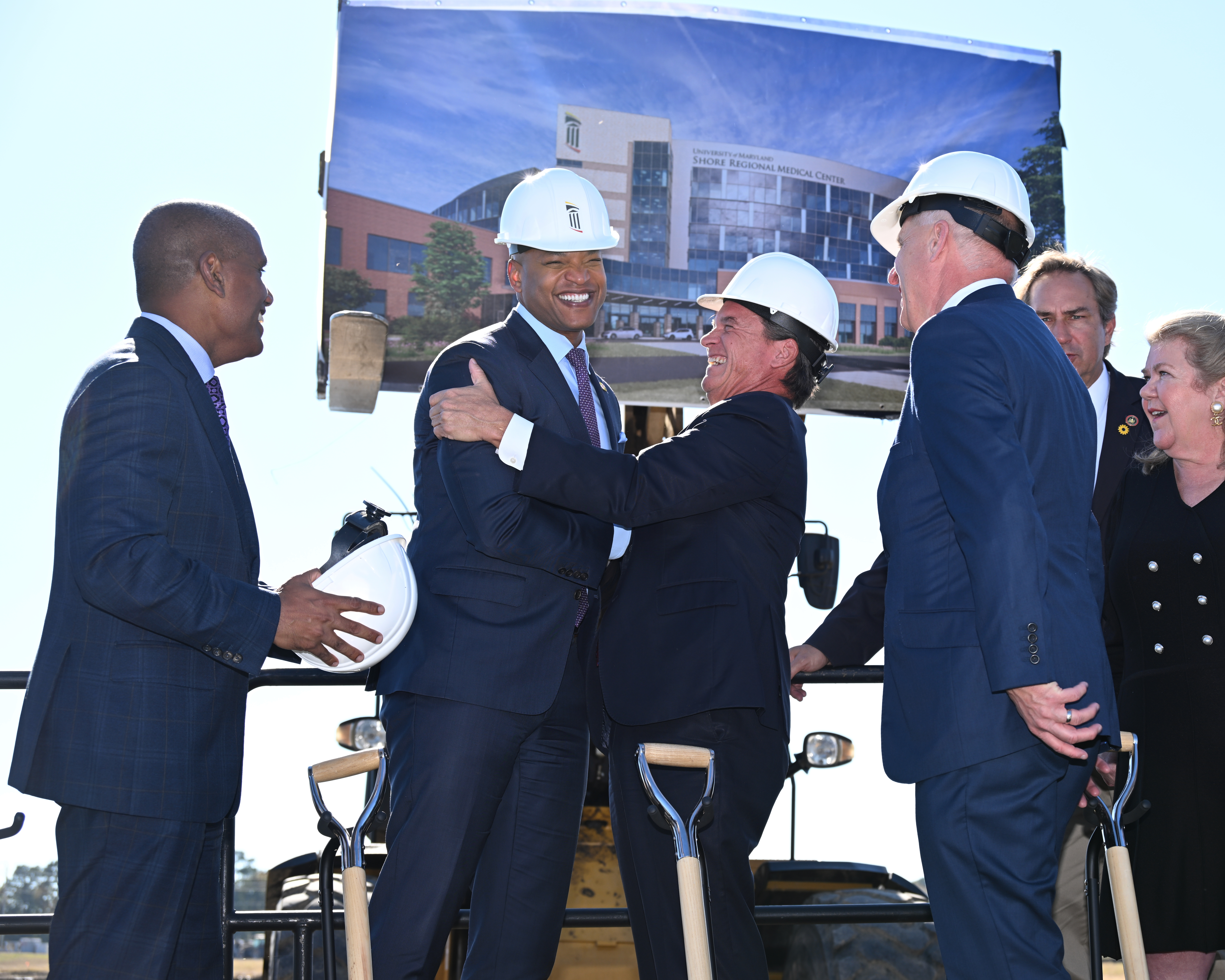
Hershey and Governor Wes Moore at an UMMS hospital groundbreaking in Easton, 2024

During the 2017 legislative session, Hershey supported legislation to assist displaced workers following hospital closures. He opposed a bill that would allow the attorney general of Maryland to impose civil penalties onto companies that gouge drug prices, which he claimed would harm competition, and a bill to provide workers with seven days of paid sick leave a year.

In 2021, Hershey introduced legislation that would allow pharmacists to switch name brands. The bill passed and became law. He also supported a bill banning medical debt collection agencies from garnishing the wages or placing liens on homes of people who owed medical debt, and limiting payments made toward medical debt at five percent of a person's income.

During the 2025 and 2026 legislative sessions, Hershey introduced a bill that would require Medicaid to provide coverage for weight loss medication.

During the 2026 legislative session, Hershey opposed the Vax Act, a bill that would allow the Maryland Department of Health to set vaccine recommendations for Marylanders independent of any federal guidelines, calling it unnecessary.

=== National politics ===
In 2012, Hershey served as a delegate to the Republican National Convention, pledged to Mitt Romney. In 2016, he unsuccessfully ran to serve as an alternate delegate to the Republican National Convention, pledged to Chris Christie. Hershey attended the 2017 inauguration of Donald Trump, and would later use social media to criticize Trump in now-deleted tweets. He opposed impeaching and removing Trump following the January 6 United States Capitol attack, saying it would "undermine the efforts to ensure a peaceful transfer of power".

During the 2017 legislative session, Hershey voted against a bill that would give the attorney general of Maryland the power to pursue cases against the federal government.

In 2018, Hershey opposed a bill requiring presidential candidates to release their tax returns to appear on the ballot in Maryland.

In August 2019, following mass shootings in El Paso, Texas, Hershey released statements on Twitter calling the incident "an act of terrorism" and the shooter a white nationalist, and called on Trump to recognize the "white supremacy problem in America". He also expressed support for a primary challenge against Ohio state legislator Candice Keller after she claimed that the 2019 Dayton shooting was caused by "drag queen advocates".

In August 2025, amid Republican efforts to redraw Texas's congressional districts to gain five congressional seats in the 2026 United States House of Representatives elections, Hershey criticized Democratic efforts to redraw Maryland's congressional districts in response to Texas's mid-decade redistricting, calling a bill that would allow Maryland legislators to do so a "transparent grab for partisan advantage". After Governor Moore organized a commission to review mid-decade redistricting in Maryland in November 2025, Hershey said he would introduce a bill to ban mid-decade redistricting, codify part of a 2022 ruling that struck down Maryland's original congressional redistricting plan as an "extreme partisan gerrymander", and require Maryland's congressional districts to be drawn by an independent redistricting commission. He opposed the redistricting plan proposed by the Governor's Redistricting Advisory Committee, which would redraw Maryland's 1st congressional district to improve the Democratic Party's chances of winning it, but told The Daily Record that he would vote to advance the congressional redistricting plan out of the Senate Rules Committee just to end debate on it by killing it on the Senate floor.

In October 2025, Hershey blamed Democrats for the 2025 United States government shutdown and criticized Moore for blaming Republicans for the shutdown, saying that Moore should instead "demand that his allies in Washington work across the aisle to pass a clean resolution and protect Maryland families".

=== Social issues ===
During the 2012 legislative session, Hershey voted against the Civil Marriage Protection Act, which legalized same-sex marriage in Maryland.

During the 2015 legislative session, Hershey was one of three senators to vote against a bill to decriminalize marijuana paraphernalia. In 2019, he was appointed to a task force on developing policy for legalizing recreational cannabis in Maryland.

In May 2015, following the 2015 Baltimore protests, Hershey and state senator Catherine Pugh visited neighborhoods damaged by fires and looting during the protests, which he says informed him of the challenges confronting the city and influenced how he responded to a package of bills aimed at improving Baltimore during the 2016 legislative session.

During the 2016 legislative session, Hershey voted against a bill that would restore voting rights for felons on parole. In June 2020, he wrote a letter to the Maryland State Board of Elections following Maryland's June 2 primary election, which was conducted largely using mail-in ballots, to express concern about potential voter fraud if mail-in ballots were used in the general election. In 2021, Hershey supported legislation that would require signature verification for mail-in ballots.

In 2021, Hershey voted for a bill to repeal "Maryland, My Maryland" as the official state song.

During debate on the Abortion Care Access Act in 2022, Hershey introduced an amendment that would restrict the facilities that could provide abortion services; the amendment was rejected. In 2023, he criticized a bill creating a statewide referendum on codifying Roe v. Wade into the Constitution of Maryland, calling it "performative progressivism".

In January 2026, Hershey opposed proposals to ban 287(g) program agreements and prohibit law enforcement from wearing face coverings while on duty in Maryland, saying that Maryland should "let the feds continue to do their job" with regard to immigration. During debate on a bill to ban 287(g) agreements in Maryland, he introduced an amendment that would've allowed local governments and sheriff's departments to continue to enter into the agreements, which was rejected in a 14–32 vote.

=== Transportation ===
In October 2010, Hershey criticized the state's public transportation system, arguing that private industry would "manage and provide this service more cost efficiently than the government".

In June 2015, Hershey said he supported Governor Larry Hogan's decision to shift funding for the Red Line toward road widening projects in other jurisdictions around the state, especially Route 404. After Governor Wes Moore revived the Red Line in 2023, Hershey called the Red Line an "unaffordable and inefficient project" and a "bad deal for taxpayers".

During the 2016 legislative session, Hershey opposed a bill that would require the Maryland Department of Transportation to use a scoring system when deciding which transportation projects to prioritize, claiming that the bill would force rural transportation projects to compete with urban transit projects. He introduced an amendment to the bill to create a separate scoring system for transit projects, which was rejected in a 28–17 vote.

In 2019, Hershey opposed a bill that would give Anne Arundel County veto power over a proposed second Chesapeake Bay Bridge, which he said would prevent any bridge project from being completed. In April 2022, he proposed replacing the current Bay Bridge spans with a single eight-lane bridge.

During the 2026 legislative session, Hershey introduced a bill to repeal vehicle registration fee increases passed during the 2024 and 2025 legislative sessions.

== Personal life ==
Hershey was married to Wendy, but is now single. He lives in Queenstown, Maryland, and is a congregant at the Our Mother of Sorrows Catholic Church.

== Electoral history ==
2002 Queen Anne's County Board of Commissioners District 2 Republican primary election
Party	Candidate	Votes	%
Republican	Rodney Niedomanski	1,718	41.0
Republican	Stephen S. Hershey Jr.	1,344	32.0
Republican	Barb Pivec	1,133	27.0
Total votes		4,195	100.0

2010 Maryland House of Delegates 36th district election
Primary election
Party	Candidate	Votes	%
Republican	Stephen S. Hershey Jr.	5,449	50.6
Republican	Richard A. Sossi (incumbent)	5,325	49.4
Total votes		10,774	100.0
General election
Republican	Stephen S. Hershey Jr.	32,364	26.9
Republican	Jay Jacobs	26,979	22.4
Republican	Michael D. Smigiel Sr. (incumbent)	26,295	21.8
Democratic	William C. Manlove	17,453	14.5
Democratic	Arthur Hock	16,472	13.7
Write-in		970	0.8
Total votes		120,533	100.0

2014 Maryland Senate 36th district election
Primary election
Party	Candidate	Votes	%
Republican	Stephen S. Hershey Jr. (incumbent)	6,007	56.0
Republican	Richard Sossi	4,720	44.0
Total votes		10,727	100.0
General election
Republican	Stephen S. Hershey Jr. (incumbent)	27,876	67.1
Democratic	Benjamin Tilghman	13,612	32.8
Write-in		30	0.1
Total votes		41,518	100.0

2018 Maryland Senate 36th district election
Primary election
Party	Candidate	Votes	%
Republican	Stephen S. Hershey Jr. (incumbent)	9,236	100.0
Total votes		9,236	100.0
General election
Republican	Stephen S. Hershey Jr. (incumbent)	33,028	65.1
Democratic	Heather Lynette Sinclair	17,691	34.9
Write-in		32	0.1
Total votes		50,751	100.0

2022 Maryland Senate 36th district election
Primary election
Party	Candidate	Votes	%
Republican	Stephen S. Hershey Jr. (incumbent)	8,119	65.5
Republican	Rick Bowers	2,838	22.9
Republican	Heather Lynette Sinclair	1,439	11.6
Total votes		12,396	100.0
General election
Republican	Stephen S. Hershey Jr. (incumbent)	36,806	96.3
Write-in		1,424	3.7
Total votes		38,230	100.0

Maryland Senate
Preceded by Bryan Simonaire	Minority Leader of the Maryland Senate; 2023–present	Incumbent
