= List of state agencies headquartered in Baltimore =

== Executive departments ==
The following State of Maryland executive departments are headquartered in Baltimore:

Agency name	Location of headquarters	Official website
Department of Aging	301 W. Preston Street	http://www.mdoa.state.md.us/
Department of Budget and Management	301 W. Preston Street	http://dbm.maryland.gov/Pages/home.aspx
Department of Business and Economic Development	401 E. Pratt Street	http://www.dbed.maryland.gov/Pages/index.html
Department of Disabilities	217 E. Redwood Street	http://www.mdod.maryland.gov/
Department of General Services	301 W. Preston Street	http://www.dgs.maryland.gov/
Department of Health and Mental Hygiene	201 W. Preston Street	http://www.dhmh.state.md.us/
Department of Human Resources	311 W. Saratoga Street	http://www.dhr.maryland.gov/
Department of Information Technology	301 W. Preston Street	http://doit.maryland.gov/pages/default.aspx
Department of Juvenile Services	120 W. Fayette Street	http://www.djs.maryland.gov/
Department of Labor, Licensing and Regulation	500 N. Calvert Street	http://www.dllr.state.md.us/
Department of Planning	301 W. Preston Street	http://planning.maryland.gov/
Department of the Environment	1800 Washington Blvd	http://www.mde.state.md.us/Pages/Home.aspx
Maryland Department of Education	200 W. Baltimore Street	https://web.archive.org/web/20110205221749/http://marylandpublicschools.org/msde

== Maryland Department of Transportation ==
Although the Maryland Department of Transportation is headquartered in Anne Arundel County, three of its subordinate organizations have headquarters located in Baltimore.

Agency name	Location of headquarters	Official website
Maryland Port Administration	401 E. Pratt Street	http://mpa.maryland.gov/
Maryland Transit Administration	6 St. Paul Street	http://mta.maryland.gov/
State Highway Administration	707 N. Calvert Street	http://www.marylandroads.com/Home.aspx

== Independent state agencies and commissions ==
The following independent state agencies and commissions have headquarters located in Baltimore.

Agency name	Location of headquarters	Official website
College Savings Plan of Maryland Board	217 East Redwood Street	http://www.collegesavingsmd.org/
Commission on Human Relations	William Donald Schaefer Tower, 6 St. Paul Street	http://www.mchr.maryland.gov/
Maryland African American Museum Corp.	830 East Pratt Street	http://www.africanamericanculture.org/
Maryland Economic Development Corp.	100 North Charles Street	http://www.medco-corp.com/
Maryland Health Care Commission	Division of Vital Statistics, 4160 Patterson Avenue	http://mhcc.maryland.gov/
Maryland Health & Higher Educational Facilities Authority	401 East Pratt Street	http://www.mhhefa.org/
Maryland Health Insurance Plan	201 East Baltimore Street	http://www.marylandhealthinsuranceplan.state.md.us/
Maryland Insurance Administration	200 St. Paul Place	http://www.mdinsurance.state.md.us/sa/jsp/Mia.jsp
Maryland Lottery Commission	1800 Washington Boulevard	http://www.mdlottery.com/
Maryland State Board of Contract Appeals	William Donald Schaefer Tower, 6 St. Paul Street	http://www.msbca.state.md.us/
Maryland Tax Court	Maryland State Offices complex, 301 West Preston Street	https://web.archive.org/web/20090405060152/http://www.txcrt.state.md.us/
People's Counsel	William Donald Schaefer Tower, 6 St. Paul Street	http://www.opc.state.md.us/
Maryland Department of Assessments and Taxation	Maryland State Offices complex, 301 West Preston Street	http://www.dat.state.md.us/
