= Steven J. Arentz =

American politician (born 1951)

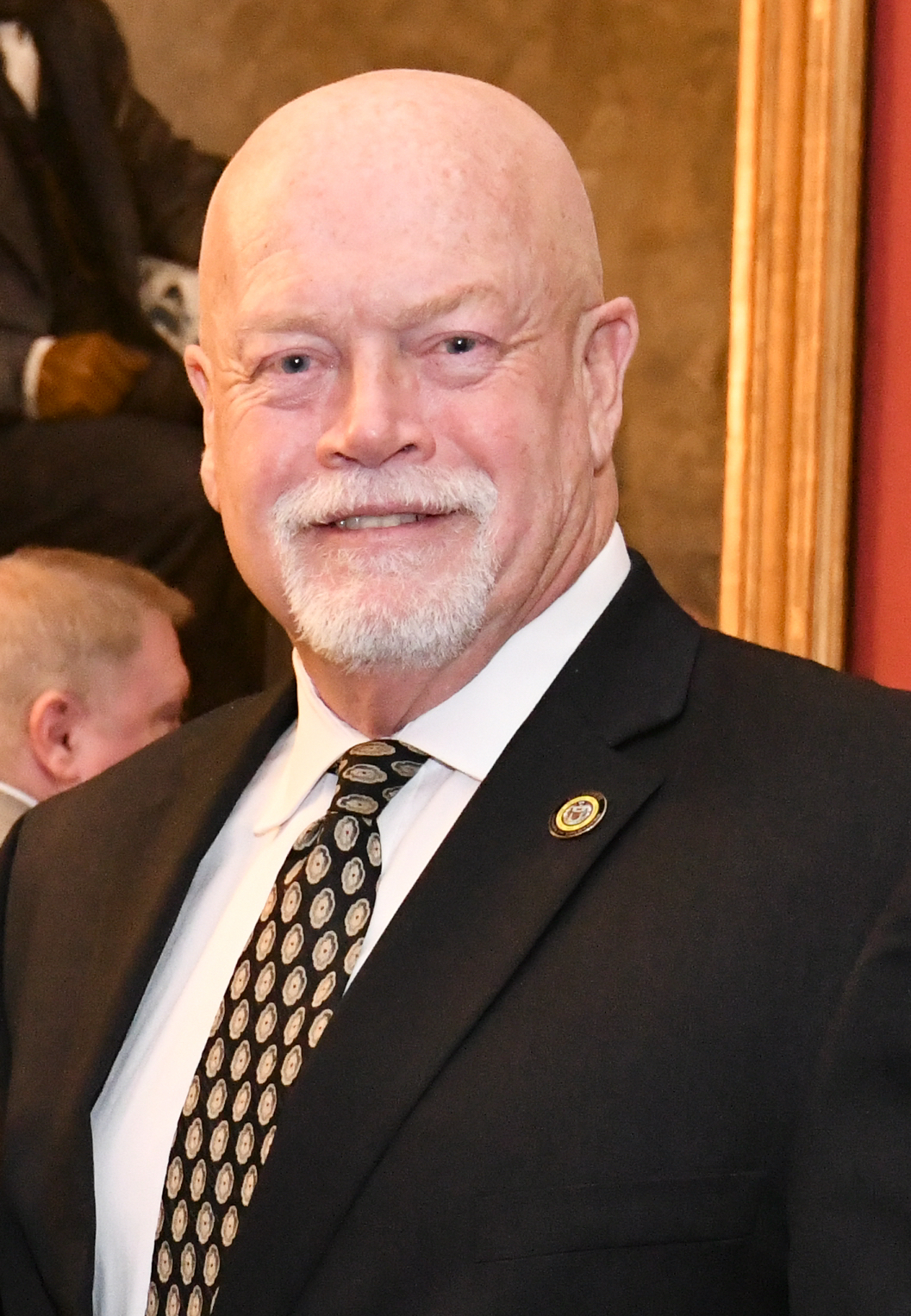
- Arentz in 2020

Member of the Maryland House of Delegates from the 36th district
- Incumbent
- Assumed office November 19, 2013 Serving with Jay Jacobs, Jeff Ghrist
- Appointed by: Martin O'Malley
- Preceded by: Stephen S. Hershey Jr.

President of the Queen Anne's County Board of County Commissioners
- In office December 14, 2010 – November 19, 2013
- Preceded by: Joseph F. Cupani
- Succeeded by: Jim Moran

Personal details
- Born: April 17, 1951 (age 75) Hollywood, Los Angeles, California, U.S.
- Party: Republican
- Spouse: Biana
- Children: 2
- Arentz's voice Arentz on criminal justice issues in the Maryland General Assembly. Recorded April 30, 2015

Steven James Arentz (born April 17, 1951) is an American politician from the Republican Party who is a member of the Maryland House of Delegates representing the 36th district since 2013. He was previously the president of the Queen Anne's County Board of Commissioners from 2010 to 2013.

== Early life and career ==
Arentz was born in Hollywood, California, and grew up in Pittsburgh, Pennsylvania, where he attended the Community College of Allegheny County and the Control Data Institute. He later attended Newbury Junior College. Arentz previously owned his own business, Hemingway's Restaurant, until its closure in October 2010, and has worked as a realtor for Long & Foster since 2003.

Arentz is married to his wife, Biana, and has two children.

== Political career ==
In 2010, Arentz was elected to the Queen Anne's County Board of Commissioners and served as chair of the Roads Board and Sanitary Commission until November 19, 2013. At the same time, he served as a member on the Queen Anne's County Board of Health and on the Task Force on Government Sustainability. Following his resignation from the county commission, businessman James Moran was appointed to serve the remainder of his term.

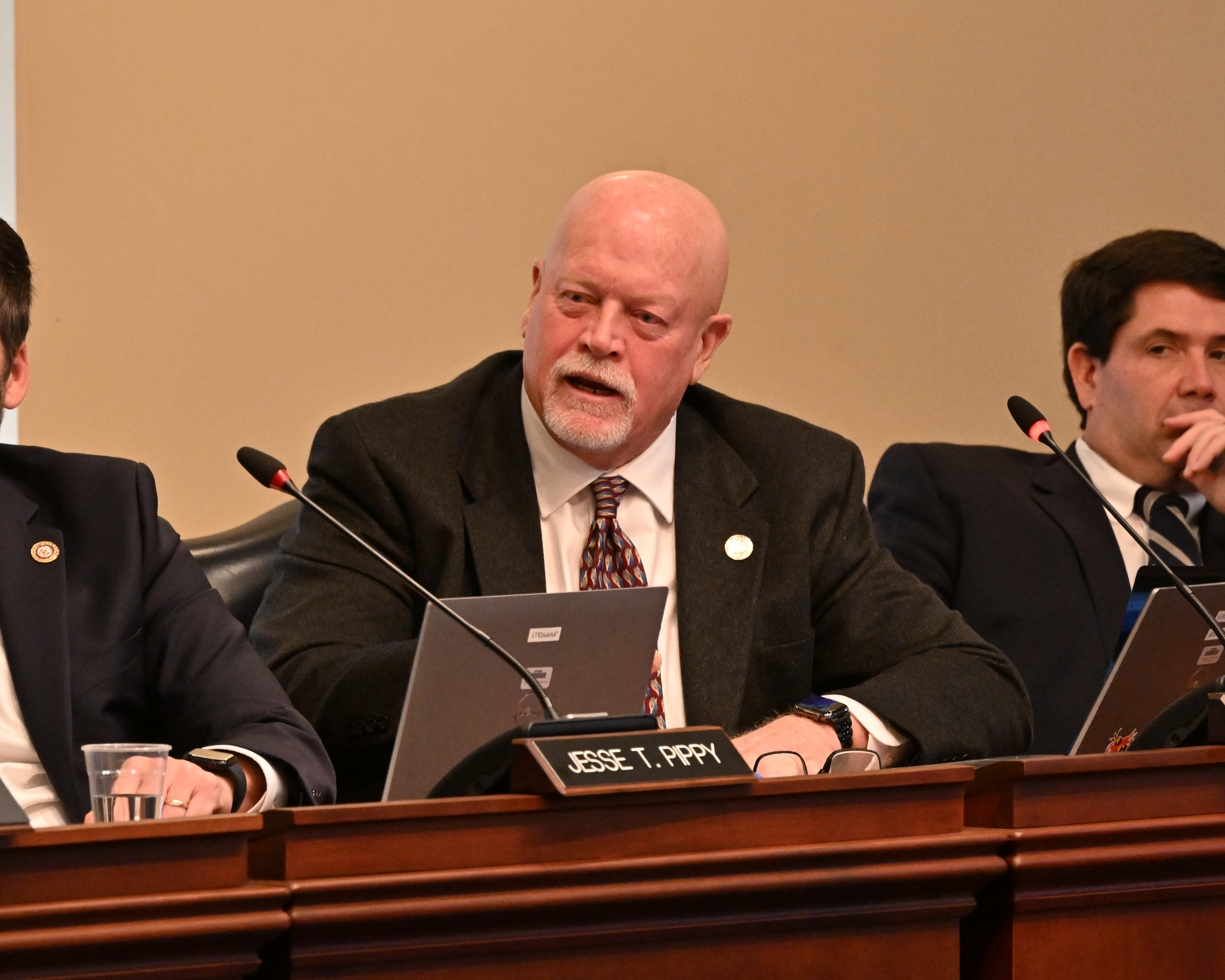
Arentz in the House Economic Matters Committee, 2023

In August 2013, following the resignation of Senate minority leader E. J. Pipkin, Arentz applied to serve the remainder of Pipkin's term in the Maryland Senate. After Stephen S. Hershey Jr. was appointed to the seat, he applied to fill Hershey's seat the Maryland House of Delegates. The Republican Central Committees in Queen Anne's, Kent, and Caroline counties voted to recommend Arentz to the seat in October 2013, and Governor Martin O'Malley appointed him to the seat later on November 12. Arentz was sworn in on November 19, 2013. He was elected to a full four-year term in 2014.

Arentz was a member of the Appropriations Committee from 2014 to 2015, and has served on the Economic Matters Committee since 2015. He also served as the Deputy Minority Whip for the Maryland House Republican Caucus from 2017 to 2020.

== Political positions ==
=== Development initiatives ===
Arentz supported the Four Seasons project, a proposed waterfront housing development on Kent Island. In July 2013, opponents of the housing project filed an ethics complaint against Arentz, claiming that he would benefit from the project since it was a few hundred yards away from a commercial building that he owned, a conflict of interest that plaintiffs said should have prevented him from voting on a measure to approve the developers' request for a wetlands permit. Arentz rejected any conflict of interest, saying that he would "gain nothing more than any other citizen in this county who has a business". Other members of the Queen Anne's County Board of Commissioners also defended Arentz's vote on the bill, predicting that Arentz would from being a realtor before he could sell any homes built at Four Seasons.

=== Education ===
During the 2014 legislative session, Arentz introduced legislation that would limit the amount of time students spent on school laptops. He reintroduced the bill in 2018.

In 2015, Arentz introduced a bill that would establish a two-way text messaging tip system for reporting bullying at schools.

In March 2021, Arentz voted against legislation to provide free menstrual products in school bathrooms.

=== Environment ===
During the 2014 legislative session, Arentz spoke in support of a bill that would allow the use of hydraulic dredges to catch clams south of the Chesapeake Bay Bridge.

In October 2017, Arentz said that he supported renewable energy, but complained that solar arrays along state highways were taking away farmland and not creating jobs. He opposed the Climate Solutions Now Act, casting doubt onto the bill's goals to achieve 100 percent renewable energy dependency, questioning whether the state could recoup for the energy lost from the transition away from fossil fuel industries, and predicting that the bill's cost would fall onto ratepayers.

=== Fiscal issues ===
During the 2014 legislative session, Arentz voted against a bill to raise the minimum wage to $10.10 an hour. In 2019, he opposed a bill to raise the state's minimum wage to $15 an hour.

In April 2018, Arentz voted against the Reform on Tap Act, a bill backed by Comptroller Peter Franchot to deregulate the state's craft beer industry.

In April 2022, Arentz said he opposed legislation that would provide workers with 24 weeks of paid family leave, which he said would hurt businesses.

=== Social issues ===
During the 2016 legislative session, Arentz introduced legislation that would extend state hate crime protections to first responders. The bill died in committee.

In March 2021, Arentz voted against legislation to repeal "Maryland, My Maryland" as the official state song.

== Electoral history ==
Queen Anne's County Commissioner At-Large District Republican primary election, 2010
| Party | Candidate | Votes | % |
|---|---|---|---|
| Republican | Steven J. Arentz | 2,620 | 51.1 |
| Republican | Frank Frohn | 1,756 | 34.3 |
| Republican | Robert Willis Foley, Jr. | 748 | 14.6 |

Queen Anne's County Commissioner At-Large District election, 2010
| Party | Candidate | Votes | % |
|---|---|---|---|
| Republican | Steven J. Arentz | 10,979 | 58.2 |
| Democratic | Neal Jackson | 7,858 | 41.7 |
| Write-in | | 20 | 0.1 |

Maryland House of Delegates District 36 Republican primary election, 2014
| Party | Candidate | Votes | % |
|---|---|---|---|
| Republican | Jay A. Jacobs (incumbent) | 6,796 | 26.8 |
| Republican | Steve Arentz (incumbent) | 6,372 | 25.1 |
| Republican | Jefferson L. Ghrist | 4,307 | 17.0 |
| Republican | Michael D. Smigiel Sr. (incumbent) | 4,163 | 16.4 |
| Republican | Alan McCarthy | 2,067 | 8.1 |
| Republican | J. D. Uhler | 1,048 | 4.1 |
| Republican | Rod Heinze | 641 | 2.5 |

Maryland House of Delegates District 36 election, 2014
| Party | Candidate | Votes | % |
|---|---|---|---|
| Republican | Jay A. Jacobs (incumbent) | 33,579 | 29.7 |
| Republican | Jefferson L. Ghrist | 27,259 | 24.1 |
| Republican | Steven J. Arentz (incumbent) | 25,516 | 22.6 |
| Democratic | Irving Pinder | 14,045 | 12.4 |
| Democratic | Robert Alan Thornton Jr. | 12,184 | 10.8 |
| Write-in | | 313 | 0.3 |

Maryland House of Delegates District 36 election, 2018
| Party | Candidate | Votes | % |
|---|---|---|---|
| Republican | Steven J. Arentz (incumbent) | 29,092 | 22.6 |
| Republican | Jay A. Jacobs (incumbent) | 28,897 | 22.5 |
| Republican | Jefferson L. Ghrist (incumbent) | 27,087 | 21.1 |
| Democratic | Crystal Woodward | 16,032 | 12.5 |
| Democratic | Michael Ian Welker | 14,201 | 11.0 |
| Democratic | Keirien Taylor | 13,246 | 10.3 |
| Write-in | | 72 | 0.1 |

Maryland House of Delegates District 36 election, 2022
| Party | Candidate | Votes | % |
|---|---|---|---|
| Republican | Jay A. Jacobs (incumbent) | 36,249 | 32.9 |
| Republican | Jefferson L. Ghrist (incumbent) | 35,640 | 32.3 |
| Republican | Steven J. Arentz (incumbent) | 35,541 | 32.2 |
| Write-in | | 2,854 | 2.6 |
