= E. J. Pipkin =

American politician

EJ Pipkin
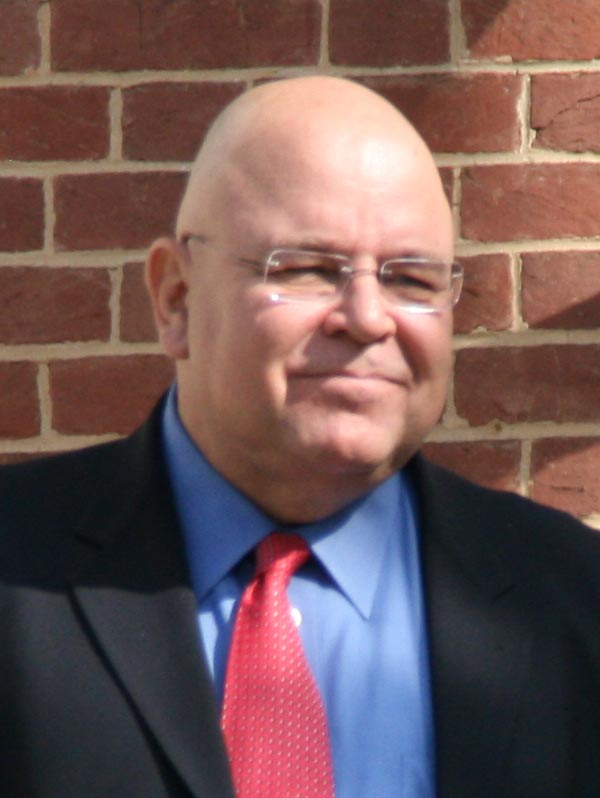

Member of the Maryland Senate from the 36th district
- In office January 8, 2003 – August 12, 2013
- Preceded by: Walter M. Baker
- Succeeded by: Steve Hershey

Minority Leader of the Maryland Senate
- In office January 18, 2011 – August 12, 2013
- Preceded by: Allan H. Kittleman
- Succeeded by: David R. Brinkley

Personal details
- Born: November 1, 1956 (age 69) Dundalk, Maryland, U.S.
- Party: Republican
- Children: 3
- Education: Salisbury University
- Alma mater: Roanoke College (BA); University of Virginia (MBA); Southern Methodist University
- Occupation: Politician; environmentalist; activist

Edward Joseph Pipkin Jr. (born November 1, 1956) is an American activist, politician, and Republican former member of the Maryland State Senate, had represented Maryland's 36th Senate district, and was first elected in 2002 and served until 2013. Prior to his election to the state senate, he worked in the field of business finance, trading bonds in New York City. He also founded an environmental group known as "Citizens Against Bay Dumping," during which he was successful in lobbying for legislation that banned irresponsible disposal of dredge spoils in the Chesapeake Bay. Pipkin currently lives in Dallas. In 2004, he unsuccessfully ran for the U.S. Senate against Barbara Mikulski. Then, in 2008, he unsuccessfully ran for Congress in Maryland's 1st congressional district, against incumbent Wayne Gilchrest and State Senator Andy Harris, losing the primary to Andy Harris. On August 5, 2013, Pipkin announced he would retire from the State Senate to attend graduate school.

== Early life ==
Pipkin grew up in Dundalk, Maryland, and went to Dundalk High School. He initially attended Salisbury University, but ultimately received his B.A. from Roanoke College. He received an M.B.A. from the University of Virginia.

== Personal life ==
Pipkin has three children: Carter, Meredith and Tyler.

== State Senate ==
Pipkin was elected to the State Senate in 2002 after defeating Democrat Walter M. Baker, who held that seat since 1979 and the chairman of the Senate Judicial Proceedings Committee. Baker was the only state senator to vote against Pipkin's efforts to ban open bay dumping. Pipkin defeated Baker by 24 percentage points.

Since his arrival to the Senate, Pipkin has authored legislation that include creating a task force to bring broadband internet to his eastern shore constituents; creating a committee that will ensure responsible handling of taxpayer dollars by the state government; and advocating for an elected school board in Cecil County to increase public involvement in public schools.

Pipkin was re-elected in 2006 with 63.7% of the vote, and re-elected again in 2010.

On August 5, 2013, Pipkin announced that he would retire from the State Senate, effective the following week, to pursue a graduate degree in sports management at Southern Methodist University in Dallas, Texas.

== U.S. Senate campaign ==
In the 2004 U.S. Senate election, Pipkin ran unsuccessfully against incumbent Democratic senator Barbara Mikulski.

He ran a series of ads during the campaign with his self-coined slogan "who knew" that attacked Mikulski's policies. This led Mikulski, who was already considered a favorite, to hold a debate with Pipkin.

== Voting record ==
In 2003, Pipkin sponsored a bill to return a tax credit to employers who provide daycare for their employees. In 2004, he sponsored a permanent repeal of the estate tax in Maryland. In 2006, Pipkin sponsored a reduction in state property taxes and a reduction in income taxes.

== Chesapeake Bay Bridge ==
As a resident of Stevensville, Pipkin himself has been affected by traffic congestion on the Chesapeake Bay Bridge, and has fought to reduce the problem. In 2005, he proposed a set of bills, which ultimately failed to pass, in that year's Maryland General Assembly session, known as the "Bay Bridge Users' Bill of Rights". The bills would have, among other things, made various modifications to the governing board of the Maryland Transportation Authority (MdTA), banned trucks from the bridge when one of its dual spans is carrying two-way traffic, and waived tolls whenever backups extended beyond a certain point. Later that year, Pipkin was one of the 22 citizens appointed by Governor Robert Ehrlich to serve on the Bay Bridge Task Force, to explore the possibility of building a new crossing of the Chesapeake Bay.

In the 2006 Maryland General Assembly session, Pipkin once again tried to pass parts of the Bay Bridge Users' Bill of Rights, this time more successfully. Among the bills that passed that year included one that made various modifications to the governing board of the MdTA (e.g. addition of two appointed members; imposition of three term limit of service; lengthening of terms to four years, rather than three years; etc.). Along with Delegate Mary Roe Walkup (R-Dist. 36), Pipkin also proposed a bill to remove the Baltimore County-Kent County crossing from the list of crossing locations that could potentially be studied in the future). However, that bill did not pass (nor did it pass when re-introduced in 2007). Also during 2006, Pipkin worked collaboratively with MdTA to promote successful legislation (Senate Bill 168, signed into law as Chapter 24 of 2007 of the Laws of Maryland) that doubled the amount of violations fines that could be issued for overweight tractor-trailers crossing the bridge.

== Election results ==
- 2006 race for Maryland State Senate – District 36

Name	Votes	Percent	Outcome
E. J. Pipkin, Rep.	27,101	63.7%	Won
Harry E. Sampson, Dem.	15,402	36.2%	Lost
Other write-ins	34	0.1%	Lost

- 2004 race for U.S. Senator

Name	Votes	Percent	Outcome
Barbara A. Mikulski, Dem.	1,504,691	64.8%	Won
E. J. Pipkin, Rep.	783,055	33.7%	Lost
Maria Allwine, Green.	24,816	1.1%	Lost
Thomas Trump, Const.	9,009	0.4%	Lost
Robert Gemmill II, Rep.	204	0.1%	Lost
Ray Bly, Rep.	109	0.0%	Lost
Dennard A. Gayle-El Sr., Rep.	47	0.0%	Lost

- 2002 race for Maryland State Senate – District 36

Name	Votes	Percent	Outcome
E. J. Pipkin, Rep.	24,827	62.5%	Won
Walter M. Baker, Dem.	14,898	37.5%	Lost
Other write-ins	27	0.1%	Lost

== References and notes ==
Party political offices
Preceded by Ross Pierpont	Republican nominee for U.S. Senator from Maryland (Class 3); 2004	Succeeded by Eric Wargotz
