= 1992 Maryland Question 6 =

Referendum on abortion

Referendum Question 6
- November 3, 1992
- Abortion Law Revision

Results
Choice	Votes	%
Yes	1,114,377	61.74%
No	690,542	38.26%
Valid votes	1,804,919	100.00%
Invalid or blank votes	0	0.00%
Total votes	1,804,919	100.00%
County results
Yes
70–80%
60–70%
50–60%
No
60–70%
50–60%
- Source: Maryland State Board of Elections

Question 6 was a voter referendum to allow voters to approve or reject a law passed by the Maryland General Assembly in 1991 to codify the U.S. Supreme Court's decision in Roe v. Wade. The referendum was approved by 61.7% of voters on November 3, 1992.

== Ballot measure ==
A draft of the referendum language had been sent to both pro-choice and pro-life groups by Maryland Attorney General J. Joseph Curran Jr. to prevent controversy over the wording of the question. He asked the groups to comment on the draft by June 19, 1992, and, after receiving feedback, rewrote the question to use "less cryptic" language. The ballot language was revised for a third and final time before being submitted to the Maryland Secretary of State to appear on the general election ballot.

After the language was approved, the Vote kNOw Coalition filed a lawsuit asking for the ballot language to be rewritten. Judge Bruce C. Williams rejected the language and ordered the attorney general to rewrite the ballot wording in a ruling that was later struck down by the Maryland Court of Appeals.

The ballot measure read as follows:

Question 6
Abortion Law Revision

Revises Maryland's abortion law to prohibit State interference with woman's abortion decision before fetus is viable, or, under certain conditions, at any time and to provide certain exceptions to the requirement that a physician notify an unmarried minor's parent or guardian prior to minor's abortion; repeals pre-abortion information requirements about abortion alternatives; repeals some, and clarifies other, provisions related to abortion referral; requires that abortions be performed by licensed physicians; provides good-faith immunity under certain conditions to physicians performing abortions; authorizes State to adopt abortion regulations; repeals certain penalty and disciplinary provisions related to the performance of abortions.

The choices read as follows:

For the Referred Law
Against the Referred Law

== History ==
In 1968, the Maryland General Assembly passed a bill that would require abortions in the state to be performed in a hospital and approved by a hospital review committee. This legislation would later be overturned by the Supreme Court's decision in Roe v. Wade, which prevented the government from placing restrictions on abortions before fetal viability.

Legislative debate on abortion had intensified following the Supreme Court's decision in Webster v. Reproductive Health Services, which imposed restrictions on state funding for abortions, with pro-choice lawmakers introducing a bill to codify the Roe decision amid fears that the Supreme Court would overturn its previous decision, thereby reinstating Maryland's restrictive 1968 law. Senate President Thomas V. Miller Jr., who self-identified as a pro-life, pledged to remain neutral on the debate but said that he personally favored laws that restricted abortion, adding that if the procedure was necessary, "you've got Washington, D.C., 35 miles down the road". House Speaker R. Clayton Mitchell Jr. also declined to bring any abortion bills up for a vote, saying that he would wait until the Senate takes action on the issue before he'd bring it up.

By 1990, abortion advocates had secured a majority in the Maryland Senate and introduced legislation that would codify the Roe decision, but it was unclear if the legislation had the votes to defeat a filibuster. Pro-choice lawmakers were initially unable to reach the 32 votes required to break the Republican-led filibuster, with the Senate voting 28–18 to continue debate on the bill. Legislators continued to filibuster the bill for eight days before coming to an agreement to couple the abortion rights legislation with another bill that would prevent the bill from going into effect until voters approved of it in a statewide referendum. However, both bills were killed by state delegate William A. Clark in the House Environmental Matters Committee, who argued in voting against the two bills that action on the House floor would be "chaotic" and force legislators "to go on record on the vote". In that year's state Senate elections, pro-abortion group Choice PAC primaried four incumbent Democratic state senators who filibustered the abortion rights bill, giving advocates the votes they needed to pass the bill during next year's legislative session.

At the start of the 1991 legislative session, Miller promised that the abortion bill would be "the first major issue the Senate takes up" that year. The new bill included a parental notification clause that Miller believed the public would be more accepting of it was to head to a referendum. Anti-abortion state senators conceded that they did not have the votes to hold a filibuster on the bill, but said they would propose amendments to the bill that would outlaw abortions for sex-select reasons, ban abortion services advertising, and requiring parental consent for abortions performed on underage girls. All amendments to the bill were rejected after five and a half hours of debate, and the bill eventually passed and was signed into law by Governor William Donald Schaefer. Afterwards, anti-abortion activists, led by former Lieutenant Governor Samuel Bogley and his Right to kNOw Coalition, said they planned to collect enough signatures to petition the law in the 1992 general election. In late June, the coalition submitted 143,622 voter signatures—more than four times the 33,373 valid signatured required—to petition the law, which were certified by the Maryland State Board of Elections in July.

== Campaign ==
Pro-choice groups led raised $1.6 million during the campaign to support Question 6, with most contributions being transferred to the Maryland for Choice committee, while abortion opponents raised $1.46 million, almost all of which was through the Vote kNOw Coalition. The pro-life campaign involved criticizing the 1991 abortion bill as "extremist", while abortion advocates called it a "moderate compromise". Anti-Question 6 ballots were also distributed in Roman Catholic churches and other congregations, and television commercials opposing Question 6, including one featuring neurosurgeon Ben Carson, were run on WMAR-TV and WBAL-TV. Carson later condemned the advertisement and asked for it to be taken down, saying that he had not known that he was making a political advertisement.

Turnout in the 1992 general elections were boosted by Question 6 and tax issues, which the Maryland Republican Party believed would hurt President George H. W. Bush, who was pro-life.

=== Endorsements ===
Yes

U.S. Senators

- Bill Bradley, U.S. Senator from New Jersey (Democrat)

U.S. Representatives

- Kweisi Mfume, U.S. Representative from Maryland's 7th congressional district (Democrat)
- Parren Mitchell, former U.S. Representative from Maryland's 7th congressional district (Democrat)

Statewide officials

- Hillary Clinton, First Lady of Arkansas and wife of presidential nominee Bill Clinton (Democrat)
- Nelson J. Sabatini, Secretary of the Maryland Department of Health and Hygiene (Democrat)
- Melvin Steinberg, Lieutenant Governor of Maryland (Democrat)

State delegates

- Delores G. Kelley, state delegate from the 42nd district (Democrat)
- Lawrence A. LaMotte, state delegate from district 5B (Democrat)
- Mary Louise Preis, state delegate from the 34th district (Democrat)
- Samuel I. Rosenberg, state delegate from the 42nd district (Democrat)

Local officials

- Kurt Schmoke, mayor of Baltimore (Democrat)

Party officials

- Vera Hall, chair of the Maryland Democratic Party (Democrat)

Individuals

- Marion C. Bascom, civil rights leader and pastor at Madison Avenue Methodist Episcopal Church
- Gloria Steinem, journalist and social-political activist

Organizations

- American Civil Liberties Union
- Maryland League of Women Voters
- National Abortion Rights Action League
- Planned Parenthood of Maryland

Newspapers

- The Baltimore Sun
- The Daily Times
- The Star Democrat
No

U.S. Executive Branch officials

- Alan Keyes, former Assistant Secretary of State for International Organization Affairs (Republican)

Statewide elected officials

- Samuel Bogley, former Lieutenant Governor of Maryland (Democrat)

State senators

- Larry E. Haines, state senator from the 5th district (Republican)

State delegates

- Marsha G. Perry, state delegate from the 33rd district (Democrat)

Individuals

- Frederica Mathewes-Green, author and speaker

Organizations

- Maryland Catholic Conference

== Opinion polls ==
Poll source	Date(s) administered	Sample size (Note: Key: A – all adults RV – registered voters LV – likely voters V – unclear)	Margin of error	For	Against	Undecided
George Washington University	October 20–24, 1992	403 (RV)	± 4.0%	70%	20%	10% (Note: "Had not heard of the referendum" with 2%)
Mason-Dixon Research	October 1992	809 (RV)	± 3.5%	52%	36%	12%
Mason-Dixon Research	August 28–30, 1992	802 (RV)	± 3.5%	54%	29%	17%
Mason-Dixon Research	June 3–5, 1992	815 (LV)	± 3.5%	60%	32%	8%
KPC Research	February 10–15, 1992	1,210 (RV)	± 2.8%	57%	31%	12%

== Results ==
1992 Maryland Question 6
Choice	Votes	%
For	1,114,377	61.74
Against	690,542	38.26
Total	1,804,919	100.00

Source: Maryland State Board of Elections

=== County breakdown ===
By county	For		Against		Total votes	
By county	Votes	%	Votes	%	Total votes	
Allegany	9,478	38.60%	15,079	61.40%	24,557	100.00%
Anne Arundel	108,394	60.40%	71,077	39.60%	179,471	100.00%
Baltimore	180,818	61.38%	113,755	38.62%	294,573	100.00%
Baltimore City	132,697	66.37%	67,237	38.62%	199,934	100.00%
Calvert	10,944	56.62%	8,385	43.38%	19,329	100.00%
Caroline	3,482	49.52%	3,550	50.48%	7,032	100.00%
Carroll	26,362	51.00%	25,328	49.00%	51,690	100.00%
Cecil	11,015	48.73%	11,590	51.27%	22,605	100.00%
Charles	14,994	50.32%	14,804	49.68%	29,798	100.00%
Dorchester	4,789	54.26%	4,037	45.74%	8,826	100.00%
Frederick	32,721	54.26%	29,042	47.02%	61,763	100.00%
Garrett	2,683	30.13%	6,223	69.87%	8,906	100.00%
Harford	41,125	53.07%	36,360	46.93%	77,485	100.00%
Howard	63,141	64.80%	34,305	35.20%	97,446	100.00%
Kent	4,026	65.01%	2,167	34.99%	6,193	100.00%
Montgomery	246,361	70.12%	104,982	29.88%	351,343	100.00%
Prince George's	153,741	66.25%	78,328	33.75%	232,069	100.00%
Queen Anne's	7,542	60.38%	4,948	39.62%	12,490	100.00%
St. Mary's	9,852	46.87%	11,166	53.13%	21,018	100.00%
Somerset	2,350	41.89%	3,260	58.11%	5,610	100.00%
Talbot	7,643	63.77%	4,342	36.23%	11,985	100.00%
Washington	19,187	47.19%	21,473	52.81%	40,660	100.00%
Wicomico	12,975	52.24%	11,861	47.76%	24,836	100.00%
Worcester	8,057	52.66%	7,243	47.34%	15,300	100.00%
Total	1,114,377	61.74%	690,542	38.26%	1,804,919	100.00%

== See also ==
- Abortion in Maryland
- 2024 Maryland Question 1
- Initiatives and referendums in the United States
