= Jay Jacobs (politician) =

American politician (born 1953)

- Jacobs in 2026

Member of the Maryland House of Delegates from the 36th district
- Incumbent
- Assumed office January 12, 2011 Serving with Steven J. Arentz, Jefferson L. Ghrist
- Preceded by: Mary Roe Walkup

Personal details
- Born: January 28, 1953 (age 73) West Palm Beach, Florida, U.S.
- Party: Republican
- Spouse: Dawn
- Children: 2
- Jacobs's voice Jay Jacobs on agricultural issues in the Maryland General Assembly. Recorded April 30, 2015

Jay A. Jacobs (born January 28, 1953) is an American politician from the Republican Party who is a member of the Maryland House of Delegates, representing the 36th district since 2011.

== Background ==
Jacobs was born on January 28, 1953, in West Palm Beach, Florida. He graduated from Kent County High School. Jacobs has owned his own business, Jay A. Jacobs Complete Kitchens and Baths LLC, since 1986.

Jacobs served as the mayor of Rock Hall, Maryland, from 1999 to 2011. He was mayor when Tropical Storm Isabel struck the fishing town in 2003, which damaged more than 100 buildings, including half of the town's motels and inns, and the town's public pier.

== In the legislature ==
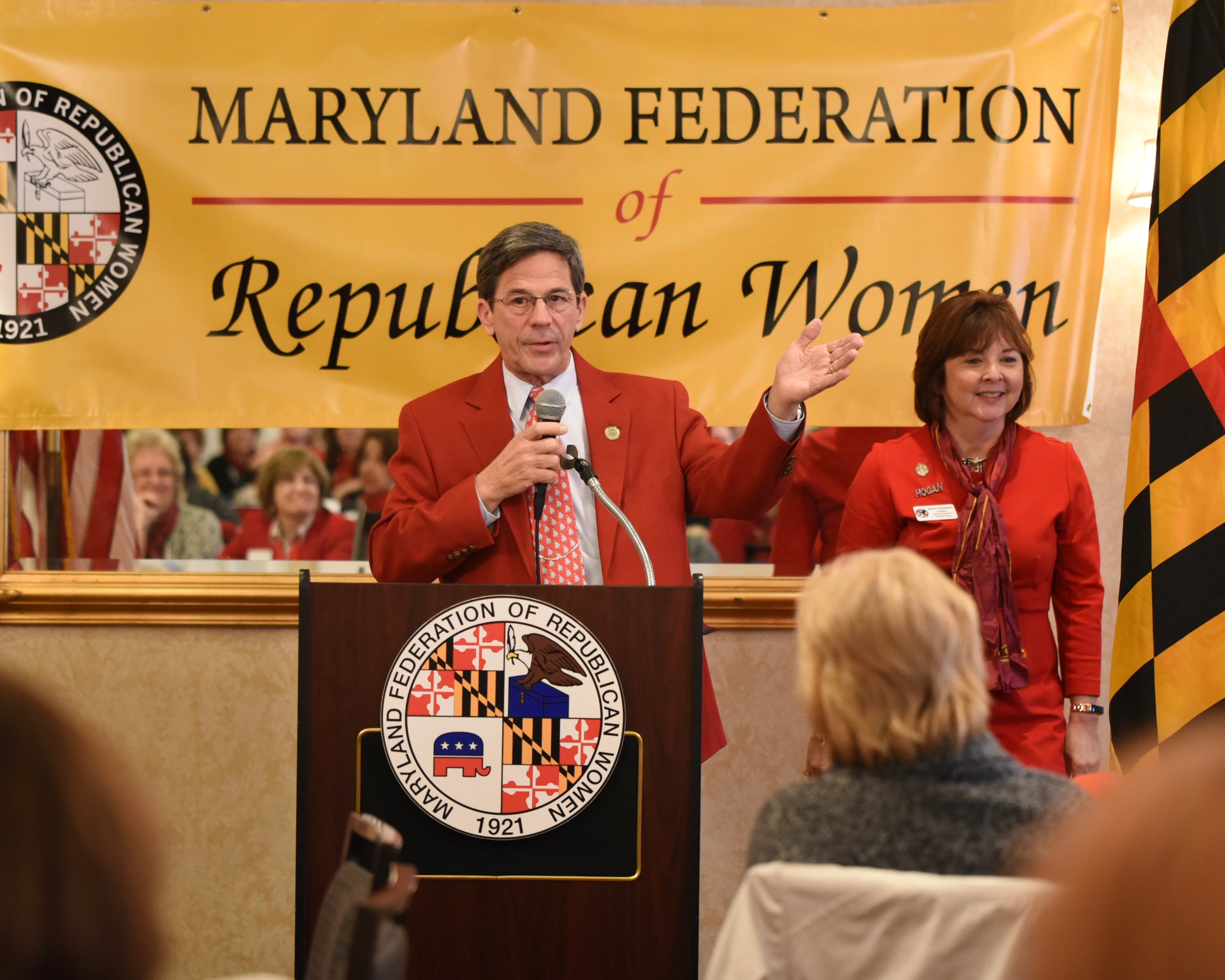
Jacobs speaks at a Maryland Federation of Republican Women event, 2019

In July 2009, Jacobs announced that he would run for the Maryland House of Delegates in District 36, seeking to succeed retiring state delegate Mary Roe Walkup. He ran unopposed in the Republican primary election, and defeated Democratic nominee Arthur Hock in the general election in November 2010. He was sworn in as a member of House of Delegates on January 12, 2011, and has served as a member of the Environment and Transportation Committee during his entire tenure. Jacobs has also served as the chair of the House Republican Caucus since 2013.

== Political positions ==
=== Agriculture and fishing ===
In 2011, Jacobs opposed legislation to ban menhaden oil products, suggesting that the state instead establish sanctuaries for menhaden.

During the 2012 legislative session, Jacobs said he opposed legislation that would require the Maryland Department of Natural Resources to cover the costs of managing fisheries with fishing license fees.

In 2014, Jacobs introduced legislation to allow the use of hydraulic dredges to catch clams south of the Chesapeake Bay Bridge. In 2016, Jacobs introduced a bill that would allow hydraulic clamming south of the Verrazano Bridge.

During the 2018 legislative session, Jacobs opposed legislation that would require the state to track air pollution from poultry farms.

During the 2026 legislative session, Jacobs requested a pause on a bill that would implement new rockfish regulations from the Maryland Department of Natural Resources (DNR) and open a catch-and-release fishery, expressing concerns about the bill's economic impacts on charter boat captains. The hold was lifted a few days later after Secretary Josh Kurtz pledged to develop an economic impact study to analyze the impacts the new rules would have on recreational fishing.

=== Education ===
In January 2020, Jacobs said he opposed the Blueprint for Maryland's Future, citing its cost. He later predicted that the Blueprint would require the state to raise taxes to fully implement, which would "stir up" voters.

During the 2023 legislative session, Jacobs introduced legislation to provide voting rights to the student member of the Kent County Board Education. The bill passed and was signed into law by Governor Wes Moore.

=== Environment ===
In January 2012, Jacobs said he opposed Maryland's "Rain Tax".

During the 2021 legislative session, Jacobs introduced a bill that would prohibit the state from entering into an agreement waiving its authority under the Clean Water Act relating the relicensure of the Conowingo Dam.

=== Gun policy ===
In July 2012, Jacobs celebrated a federal court decision overturning the state's ban requiring gun owners to show "good or substantial reason" to open carry. During the 2013 legislative session, he voted against the Firearm Safety Act of 2013, a bill that placed restrictions on firearm purchases and magazine capacity in semi-automatic rifles.

=== Social issues ===
During the 2012 legislative session, Jacobs voted against the Civil Marriage Protection Act, which legalized same-sex marriage in Maryland, saying that he believed that "conventional marriage is opposite sex couples".

In 2014, Jacobs said he supported a bill to ban the sale of extreme-strength liquors in Maryland.

=== Taxes ===
During the 2013 legislative session, Jacobs voted against a bill to index the state's gas tax to inflation to pay for transportation projects.

=== Other issues ===
In January 2014, Jacobs said he opposed the legalization of cannabis in Maryland and a bill to raise the minimum wage, which he claimed would threaten businesses on the Eastern Shore.

During the 2018 legislative session, Jacobs introduced, but later withdrew, legislation that would ban a proposed second Bay Bridge from being built in Kent County.

In September 2025, Jacobs criticized Democratic proposals to redraw Maryland's 1st congressional district in response to Republican efforts to create new Republican districts in Texas and Missouri, saying that Cecil County was contiguous to the rest of the 1st district and should remain in the district.

== Personal life ==
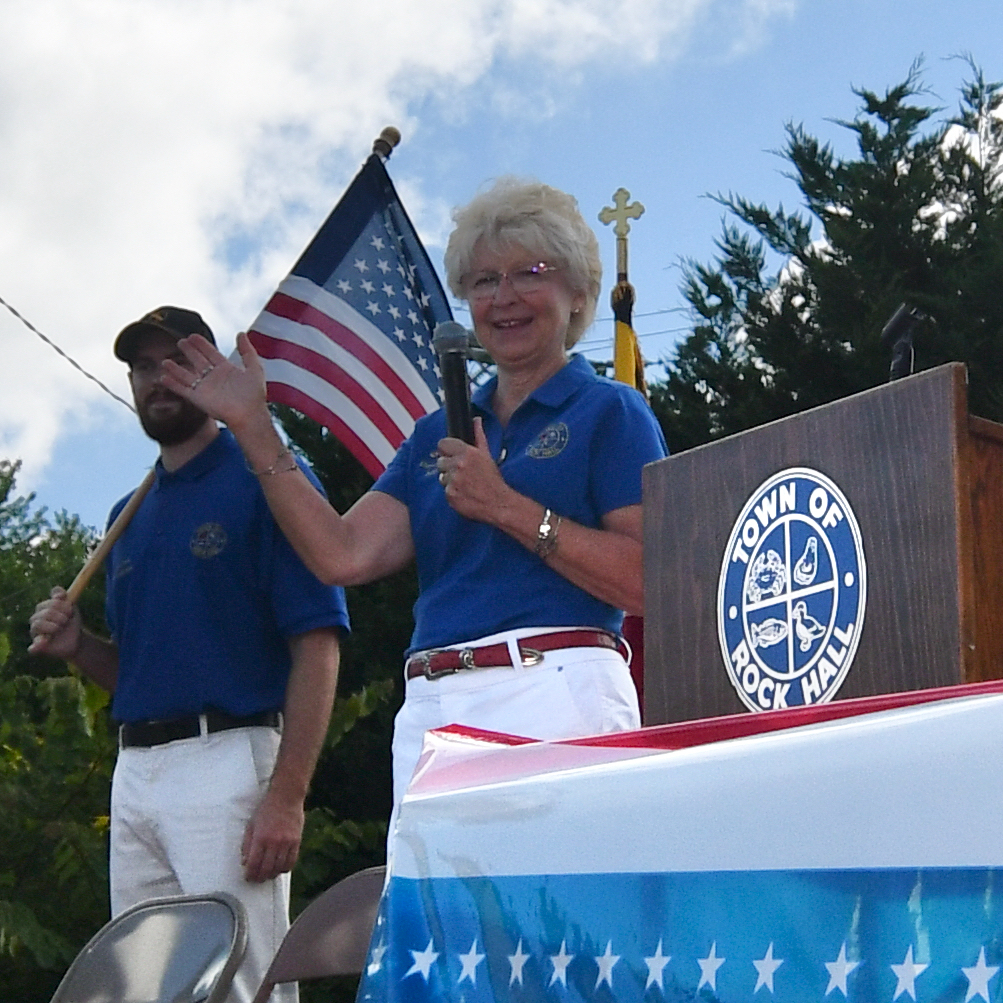
Dawn Jacobs in 2021

Jacobs is married to his wife, Dawn, who served as the mayor of Rock Hall, Maryland, from 2019 to 2023. Together, they have two adult daughters. Jacobs attends religious services at the Wesley United Methodist Church in Centreville, Maryland.

== Electoral history ==
Maryland House of Delegates District 36 Kent County Republican primary election, 2010
Party	Candidate	Votes	%
Republican	Mary Roe Walkup (incumbent)	2,176	60.9
Republican	Jay A. Jacobs	1,361	39.1

Maryland House of Delegates District 36 Kent County Republican primary election, 2010
Party	Candidate	Votes	%
Republican	Jay A. Jacobs	8,685	100.0

Maryland House of Delegates District 36 election, 2010
Party	Candidate	Votes	%
Republican	Stephen S. Hershey Jr.	32,364	26.9
Republican	Jay A. Jacobs	26,979	22.4
Republican	Michael D. Smigiel Sr. (incumbent)	26,295	21.8
Democratic	William C. Manlove	17,453	14.5
Democratic	Arthur Hock	16,472	13.7
Write-in		970	0.8

Maryland House of Delegates District 36 election, 2014
Party	Candidate	Votes	%
Republican	Jay A. Jacobs (incumbent)	33,579	29.7
Republican	Jefferson L. Ghrist	27,259	24.1
Republican	Steven J. Arentz (incumbent)	25,516	22.6
Democratic	Irving Pinder	14,045	12.4
Democratic	Robert Alan Thornton Jr.	12,184	10.8
Write-in		313	0.3

Maryland House of Delegates District 36 election, 2018
Party	Candidate	Votes	%
Republican	Steven J. Arentz (incumbent)	29,092	22.6
Republican	Jay A. Jacobs (incumbent)	28,897	22.5
Republican	Jefferson L. Ghrist (incumbent)	27,087	21.1
Democratic	Crystal Woodward	16,032	12.5
Democratic	Michael Ian Welker	14,201	11.0
Democratic	Keirien Taylor	13,246	10.3
Write-in		72	0.1

Maryland House of Delegates District 36 election, 2022
Party	Candidate	Votes	%
Republican	Jay A. Jacobs (incumbent)	36,249	32.9
Republican	Jefferson L. Ghrist (incumbent)	35,640	32.3
Republican	Steven J. Arentz (incumbent)	35,541	32.2
Write-in		2,854	2.6
