= Gloria Purvis =

African-American Catholic journalist

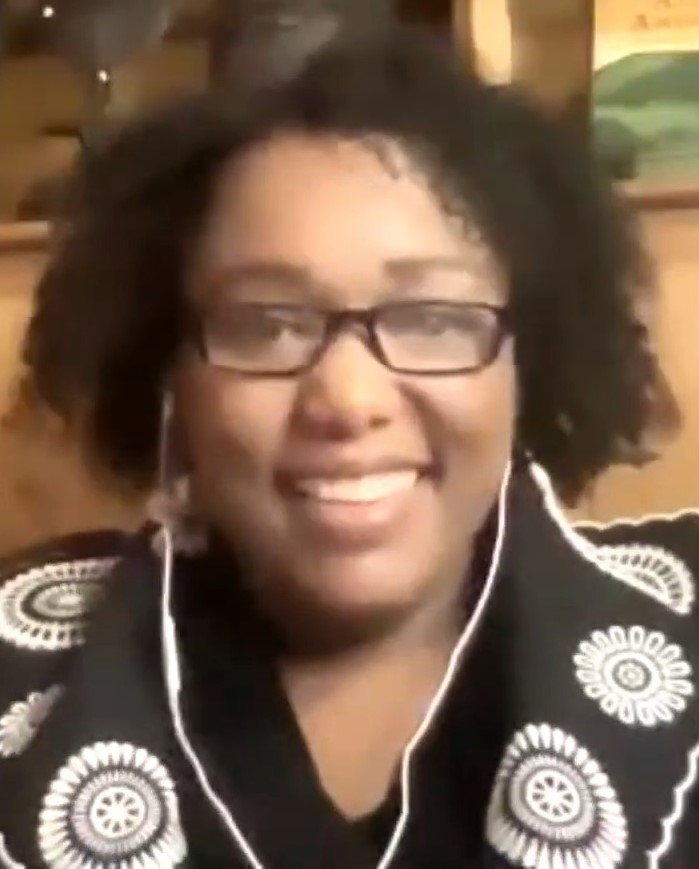
- Purvis in 2021
- Born: Charleston, South Carolina, U.S.
- Education: Cornell University (BS)
- Occupations: Journalist and speaker
- Movement: Pro-life movement

Gloria Purvis is an African-American Catholic public scholar, speaker, author, podcaster, and activist in Washington, D.C. She has spoken and written extensively on women's rights, abortion, sex, marriage, family, religious liberty, and racial justice.

== Early life and education ==
Born and raised in Charleston, South Carolina, Purvis was educated by the Oblate Sisters of Providence and converted to Catholicism as a child. She later graduated from Cornell University with a Bachelor's of Science in Human Development and Family Studies.

== Career ==
Purvis worked for more than a decade in the mortgage and finance industry before becoming a policy manager at a major financial services company, where she co-chaired the Catholic Employee Network.

Purvis for years co-hosted the Morning Glory show on EWTN Radio, which ended in December 2020 when the show was abruptly canceled. Purvis was not given a reason for the cancellation, which was part of "a year-end spate of changes at EWTN." She later began hosting The Gloria Purvis Podcast in collaboration with America Media.

In 2021, the University of Notre Dame's Office of Life and Human Dignity at the McGrath Institute for Church Life appointed Purvis its inaugural Pastoral Fellow.

In November 2022, Purvis spent two hours at the private residence of Pope Francis as a member of a five-person team from America. She is the first African-American female Catholic journalist to interview Pope Francis for such an extensive time period at his personal residence. Purvis shared with Pope Francis some of the concerns and experiences of Black Catholics in the U.S. Catholic Church.

Purvis held an interview in May 2022 with Archbishop Salvatore Cordileone of San Francisco, discussing with him his reasons for barring Speaker of the House Nancy Pelosi from receiving communion in her home diocese.

In the aftermath of the Dobbs v. Jackson Women's Health Organization decision from the Supreme Court of the United States, Purvis penned a piece for Deseret News decrying abortion as a solution for Black women.

Purvis was named a scholar in residence at St. Martin's University for the 2023–24 academic year.

In 2024, Purvis gave a keynote address to the National Eucharistic Congress. It was a challenge to the U.S. Church to remember the visible signs of unity in the Church and to reject the disunity visible in the Church as evidenced by, for example, those who reject Pope Francis. She also identified the sin of racism as a sign of disunity.

In April 2025, Purvis gave the Dahlgren Chapel Sacred Lecture at Georgetown University.

In September 2025, Providence College announced "Purvis, a renowned Catholic scholar, speaker, and journalist, has joined the College as special advisor for Integral Human Development and Dignity. Gloria will be part of the Office of Mission & Ministry in a new role that combines the work of mission and ministry, the School of Nursing and Health Sciences and institutional equity."

== Volunteer work ==
Purvis served as Chairperson of the Culture of Life Committee and Coordinator of the Young Adult Association at St. Augustine Catholic Church in Washington, D.C., from 1998 to 2002 and on the Archdiocesan Pastoral Council for the Archdiocese of Washington from 1999 to 2003.

Purvis has served as a board member for the Northwest Pregnancy Center and Maternity Home in Washington, D.C. and an advisory board member on the Maryland Catholic Conference's Respect for Life Department. She has also served on the National Black Catholic Congress' Leadership Commission on Social Justice. She was the chairperson for Black Catholics United for Life, which has sought to increase the size and strength of active Black Catholics participating in the pro-life movement.

== Media appearances ==
Purvis has been featured in The New York Times, National Catholic Reporter, Newsweek, and Catholic News Service. She has also been a featured guest on PBS NewsHour and Fox News.

In the aftermath of the George Floyd murder and Black Lives Matter protests, America Magazine interviewed Purvis on the subjects of racism, pro-life politics, and the lure of the devil.

In the midst of the COVID pandemic Purvis penned a piece in America Magazine titled, "Pro-lifers expect sacrifices from pregnant women. Why do so many balk at the sacrifices of Covid-19 restrictions?"

She was interviewed by Robert P. George for the Witherspoon Institute's online journal Public Discourse.

She created a six part YouTube video series for Word on Fire Institute titled Racism, Human Dignity and the Catholic Church in America.

Purvis is a papal news contributor for ABC News and provided commentary during the conclave that elected Pope Leo XIV.

== Accolades ==
Our Sunday Visitor named Gloria Purvis, Catholic of the Year, in 2020. The University of Portland awarded Purvis a Doctorate in Humane Letters Honora Causa in 2022. St. Martin's University awarded her a Doctorate of Humane Letters in May 2023, at which time she was also the commencement speaker. Salve Regina University awarded Purvis a Doctorate in Humane Letters Honora Causa in May 2024. In October 2024, Ender's Island awarded Dr. Gloria Purvis the St. Edmund's Medal of Honor. The medal is presented to men and women who, like St. Edmund, see talents and expertise as God-given gifts. They are ordinary people doing extraordinary service for the church and community. It is a prestigious honor.
