= Jefferson L. Ghrist =

American politician (born 1975)

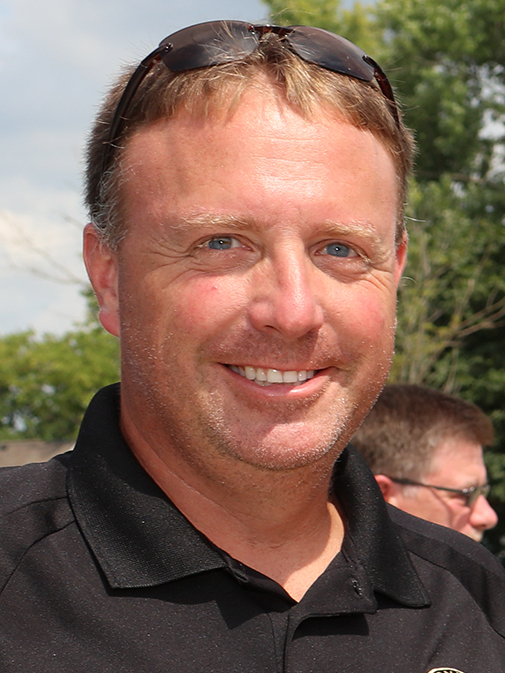

Member of the Maryland House of Delegates from the 36th district
- Incumbent
- Assumed office January 14, 2015 Serving with Jay Jacobs, Steven Arentz
- Preceded by: Michael D. Smigiel Sr.

President of the Caroline County Board of Commissioners
- In office January 2, 2014 – December 2, 2014
- Preceded by: Wilbur Levengood, Jr.
- Succeeded by: Larry C. Porter
- In office December 7, 2010 – January 1, 2012
- Preceded by: Roger L. Layton
- Succeeded by: Wilbur Levengood, Jr.

Vice President of the Caroline County Board of Commissioners
- In office January 8, 2013 – January 2, 2014
- Preceded by: Wilbur Levengood, Jr.
- Succeeded by: Wilbur Levengood, Jr.

Personal details
- Born: March 14, 1975 (age 51)
- Party: Republican
- Spouse: Michele
- Children: 2
- Ghrist's voice Ghrist on the 2014 Maryland gubernatorial election and the 2015 legislative session. Recorded April 30, 2015

Jefferson L. Ghrist (born March 14, 1975) is an American politician who has served as a member of the Maryland House of Delegates representing District 36 since 2015. A member of the Republican Party, he previously served as a member of the Caroline County Board of Commissioners from 2006 to 2014.

== Background ==
Ghrist was born on March 14, 1975. He graduated from North Caroline High School and later attended Chesapeake College and Salisbury University, where he earned a Bachelor of Arts degree in economics in 1997. After graduating, Ghrist worked as an assistant store manager at Home Depot and as a real estate agent.

Ghrist was first elected to the Caroline County Board of Commissioners in 2006. He served as the board's president of the Caroline County Board of Commissioners from 2010 to 2012, and again in 2014. Ghrist briefly ran for Congress in Maryland's 1st congressional district in 2010, challenging incumbent Democratic U.S. Representative Frank Kratovil, but dropped out in December 2009 and endorsed state senator Andy Harris.

== In the legislature ==
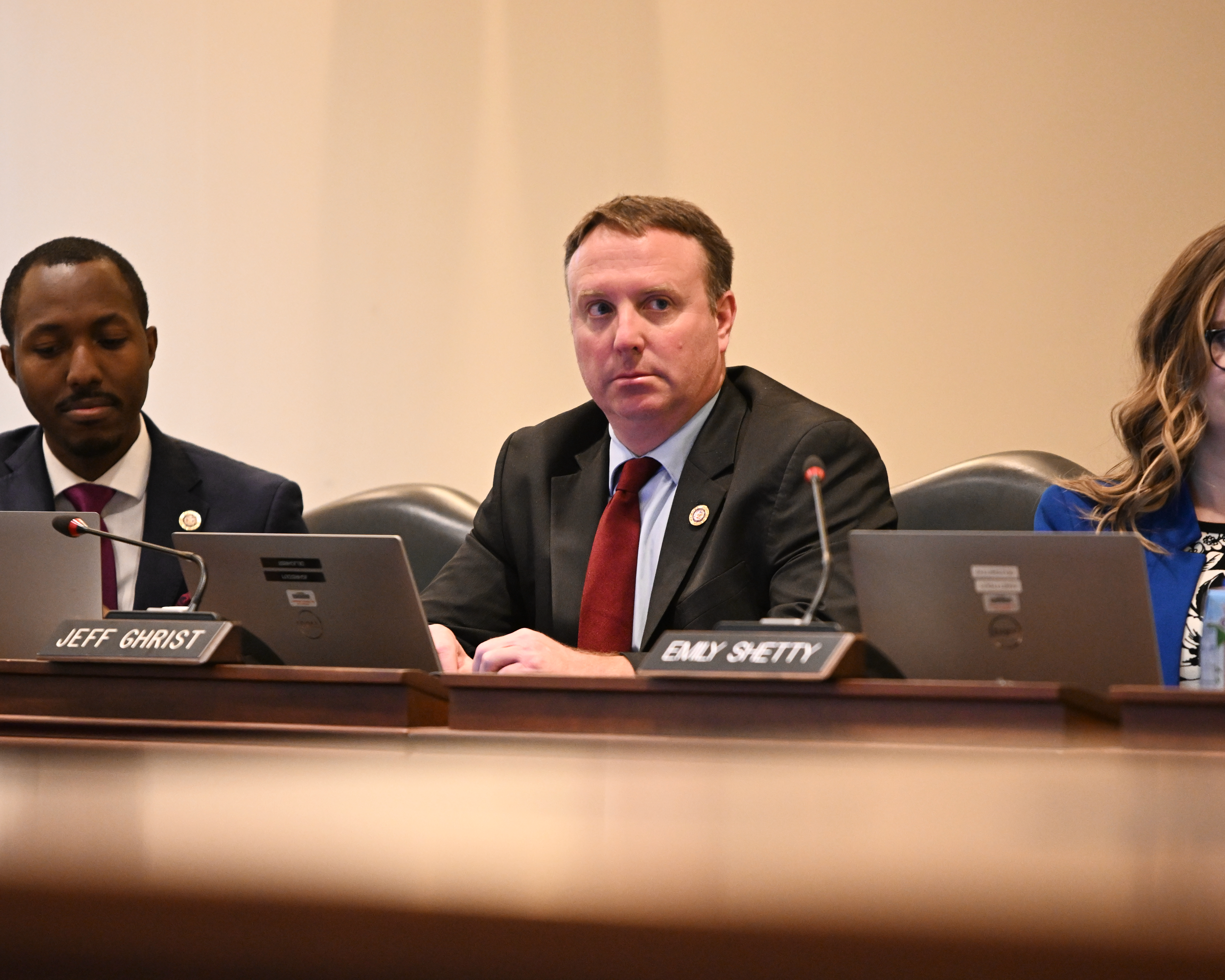
Ghrist in the Appropriations Committee, 2023

On October 29, 2013, Ghrist filed paperwork to run for election to one of the three District 36 seats in the House of Delegates. In the primary, he edged out incumbent delegate Michael D. Smigiel Sr. with 17 percent of the vote and by a margin of 144 votes, and went on to win the general election with 24.1 percent of the vote. Ghrist was sworn in on January 14, 2015, and is the first state delegate from Caroline County since Robert Thornton in 1994.

Ghrist has served as a member of the Appropriations Committee during his entire tenure. He also served as a deputy minority whip from 2019 to 2021, and as the minority parliamentarian since 2022. In January 2026, House Speaker Joseline Peña-Melnyk named Ghrist as the co-chair of the newly-created Rural Caucus, alongside Democrat Natalie Ziegler.

== Political positions ==
Ghrist is a fiscal conservative who supports limited government and increasing state funding to local jurisdictions while reducing taxes. During his tenure as county commissioner, he voted to cut Caroline County's budget by thirteen percent by reducing payrolls and employee pensions.

=== Education ===
Ghrist opposes the Blueprint for Maryland's Future, saying that its costs will be a "disaster" for school systems and students and predicting that counties would have to raise taxes to pay for it. During the 2023 legislative session, he introduced the Right to Learn Act, which would allow students attending failing schools to change schools and expand the state's private school voucher program.

=== Environment ===
Ghrist supports "pragmatic, scientifically-supported" environmental laws, but opposes environmental legislation passed by the Maryland General Assembly. In 2019, he opposed a bill to establish the Oyster Advisory Commission to develop policy recommendations on protecting oyster habitats, predicting that it would kill Maryland's oyster farming industry. During the 2022 legislative session, Ghrist opposed a bill that would move pesticide regulation from the Maryland Department of Agriculture to the Maryland Department of the Environment.

=== Gun policy ===
During the 2021 legislative session, Ghrist opposed a bill that would require background checks on all gun sales, which he said would "destroy the rural way of life".

=== Marijuana ===
In 2018, Ghrist said that he opposed the legalization of recreational marijuana, calling marijuana a "gateway drug". In 2023, Ghrist said he voted for Question 4 to legalize recreational marijuana.

=== Redistricting ===
In January 2026, Ghrist opposed the map proposed by the Governor's Redistricting Advisory Commission, which would improve the Democratic Party's chances of winning Maryland's 1st congressional district, criticizing the map for grouping suburban areas in Howard County with counties on the Eastern Shore of Maryland.

=== Social issues ===
During the 2023 legislative session, Ghrist introduced legislation that would prohibit foreign governments from buying agricultural land in Maryland.

=== Transportation ===
Ghrist supports reducing state funding for rural public transportation. He supports building a second Chesapeake Bay Bridge and supports setting aside money for the project ahead of its construction, saying that he hoped project planners would avoid "the same mistake" Baltimore legislators made by not setting aside money for the Red Line before Governor Larry Hogan cancelled it.

== Personal life ==
Ghrist is married to his wife, Michele, whom he met in high school and married soon after graduating college. Together, they have two children and live in Ridgely, Maryland.

== Electoral history ==
Caroline County Commissioner at-large Republican primary election, 2006
Party	Candidate	Votes	%
Republican	Jeff Ghrist	1,128	24.0
Republican	John W. Cole (incumbent)	1,065	22.7
Republican	Roger L. Layton (incumbent)	1,013	21.6
Republican	Franklin W. Prettyman	819	17.4
Republican	Ellery Adams	674	14.3

Caroline County Commissioner at-large election, 2006
Party	Candidate	Votes	%
Republican	John W. Cole (incumbent)	4,456	19.2
Republican	Roger L. Layton (incumbent)	4,444	19.2
Republican	Jeff Ghrist	4,193	18.1
Democratic	Marty Gangemi (incumbent)	3,931	17.0
Democratic	James Phelps	3,574	15.4
Democratic	James Brown	2,584	11.1

Caroline County Commissioner at-large election, 2010
Party	Candidate	Votes	%
Republican	Jeff Ghrist (incumbent)	5,505	21.9
Republican	Larry C. Porter	5,303	21.1
Republican	Wilbur Levengood Jr.	4,816	19.2
Democratic	Marty Gangemi	4,230	16.9
Democratic	James Brown	2,371	9.5
Democratic	Terenda V. Thomas	2,200	8.8
Write-in		659	2.7

Maryland House of Delegates District 36 Republican primary election, 2014
Party	Candidate	Votes	%
Republican	Jay A. Jacobs (incumbent)	6,796	26.8
Republican	Steven J. Arentz (incumbent)	6,372	25.1
Republican	Jefferson L. Ghrist	4,307	17.0
Republican	Michael D. Smigiel Sr. (incumbent)	4,163	16.4
Republican	Alan McCarthy	2,067	8.1
Republican	J. D. Uhler	1,048	4.1
Republican	Rod Heinze	641	2.5

Maryland House of Delegates District 36 election, 2014
Party	Candidate	Votes	%
Republican	Jay A. Jacobs (incumbent)	33,579	29.7
Republican	Jefferson L. Ghrist	27,259	24.1
Republican	Steven J. Arentz (incumbent)	25,516	22.6
Democratic	Irving Pinder	14,045	12.4
Democratic	Robert Alan Thornton Jr.	12,184	10.8
Write-in		313	0.3

Maryland House of Delegates District 36 election, 2018
Party	Candidate	Votes	%
Republican	Steven J. Arentz (incumbent)	29,092	22.6
Republican	Jay A. Jacobs (incumbent)	28,897	22.5
Republican	Jefferson L. Ghrist (incumbent)	27,087	21.1
Democratic	Crystal Woodward	16,032	12.5
Democratic	Michael Ian Welker	14,201	11.0
Democratic	Keirien Taylor	13,246	10.3
Write-in		72	0.1

Maryland House of Delegates District 36 election, 2022
Party	Candidate	Votes	%
Republican	Jay A. Jacobs (incumbent)	36,249	32.9
Republican	Jefferson L. Ghrist (incumbent)	35,640	32.3
Republican	Steven J. Arentz (incumbent)	35,541	32.2
Write-in		2,854	2.6
