= Maryland Department of Planning =

Maryland Department of Planning (MDP)

Agency overview
- Formed: 1959
- Jurisdiction: Maryland
- Headquarters: 301 W. Preston St. Suite 1101 Baltimore, Maryland 21201
- Agency executives: Rebecca Flora, Secretary of Planning; Vacant, Deputy Secretary
- Parent agency: State of Maryland Executive Department
- Website: https://planning.maryland.gov/

The Maryland Department of Planning (MDP) is a cabinet-level agency in the government of the State of Maryland. The department is part of the Executive branch of the government and reports to the Governor of Maryland.

The Maryland Department of Planning works with State and local government agencies to ensure comprehensive and integrated planning for the best use of Maryland's land and other resources. To local governments, the department provides technical expertise, such as surveys, land use studies, and urban renewal plans. Also, the department compiles data on the State for use in planning, including congressional redistricting. Implementing State planning and smart growth policies is also the responsibility of the Department of Planning.

== Background ==
The history of State land use planning in Maryland goes back further than that of most states in the U.S. Although Maryland is 42nd among the 50 states in size (9,843.62 sq. miles), it is 19th in population (5,633,597) and ranks fifth in population density (580 per sq. mile).

As a result, the pressure to use Maryland’s land for a wide range of uses has been intense and ongoing – as has concern for the impact and location of those uses. The issues of uncontrolled growth, premature rural subdivision, loss of productive soils, strip growth, loss of forest land, loss of Bay fisheries, loss of public Bay access, the need to plan for infrastructure and other capital improvements and the need to acquire forest land and set goals for agricultural land preservation have been troubling state planning officials since the late 1930s! This according to the report of the State Planning Commission, entitled Five Years of State Planning, published in 1938.

The Department of Planning started out as the State Planning Commission in 1933, the first of its kind in the U.S. The commission was created to coordinate Depression-era public works programs of the National Resources Planning Board and the Works Projects Administration (WPA). Governor Albert C. Ritchie appointed the first five members. Dr. Abel Wolman served as chairman, with other members from the State Department of Health, Board of State Aid and Charities, State Roads Commission, and one member at-large.

== History ==
The Maryland Department of Planning began in 1933 as the State Planning Commission. When the State Planning Department formed in 1959, the Commission became part of the new department. In 1969, the department reorganized as the Maryland Department of State Planning. The department was restructured in 1989 to become the Maryland Office of Planning (Chapter 540, Acts of 1989).

Effective July 1, 2000, the Maryland Office of Planning was renamed the Maryland Department of Planning and became a cabinet-level agency. The department is the principal staff agency for land use planning matters concerned with the resources and development of the State.

In July 2005, the Division of Historical and Cultural Programs(DHCP) transferred to the Department of Planning from the Department of Housing and Community Development (DHCD). The transfer of DHCP to MDP added the Maryland Historical Trust (Maryland's State Historic Preservation Office, or SHPO), the Jefferson Patterson Park and Museum and the Banneker-Douglass Museum (preserving Maryland's African American heritage). The Banneker-Douglass Museum was transferred to the Governor's Office of Community Initiatives in 2007.

In 2007, the department organized to oversee three main functions: Communications and Intergovernmental Affairs; Planning Services; and Historical and Cultural Programs.

In 2015, the Department re-organized into three main functions: Operations; Planning Services; and Historical and Cultural Programs. (See Historical Evolution)

== Agency heads ==
1933 Dr. Abel Wolman, First Chairman of the Maryland State Planning Commission
1942: I. Alvin Pasarew, Director, Maryland State Planning Commission
1959: James J. O'Donnell, Secretary, Maryland State Planning Department
1969: Vladimir A. Wahbe, Secretary, Maryland Department of State Planning
1979: Constance Lieder, Secretary, Maryland Department of State Planning
1989: Ronald Kreitner, Director, Maryland Office of Planning
2000: Harriet Tregoning, Secretary, Maryland Department of Planning
2001: Roy Kienitz, Secretary, Maryland Department of Planning
2003: Audrey A. Scott, Secretary, Maryland Department of Planning
2007: Richard Eberhart Hall, AICP, Secretary, Maryland Department of Planning
2015: David R. Craig, Secretary, Maryland Department of Planning
2016: Wendi W. Peters, Acting Secretary, Maryland Department of Planning
2017: Robert S. McCord, Esq., Secretary, Maryland Department of Planning
2022: Sandy Schrader, Acting Secretary, Maryland Department of Planning
2023: Rebecca L. Flora, AICP, Secretary, Maryland Department of Planning

== Sources ==
Maryland Manual On-Line: A Guide to Maryland Government, Copyright September 18, 2009 Maryland State Archives (http://www.msa.md.gov/); See Maryland Department of Planning
