= Maryland Legislative District 36 =

American legislative district

Maryland's legislative district 36
- Represents; Kent County, Queen Anne's County and parts of Caroline County and Cecil County
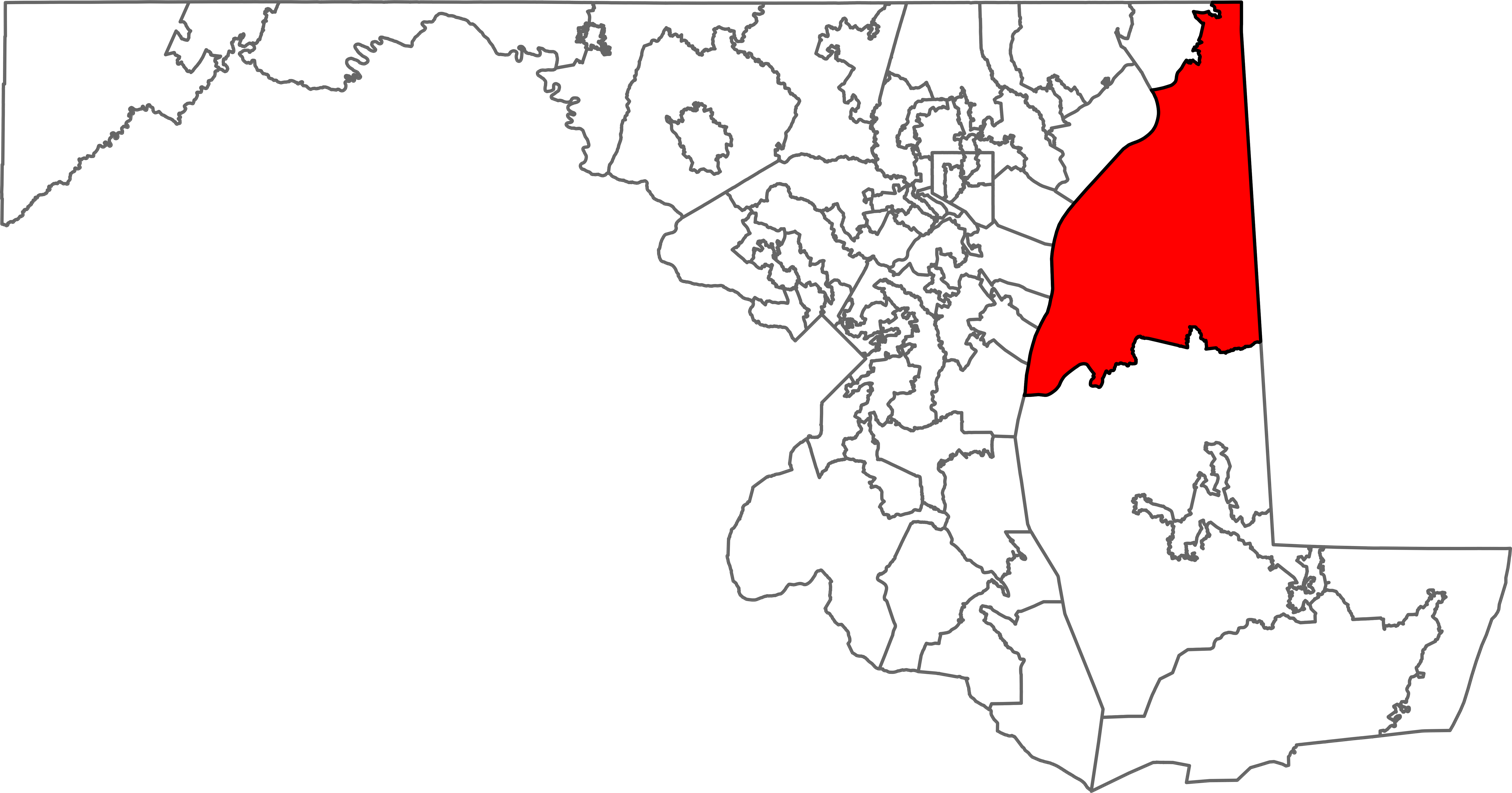
- Senator: Stephen S. Hershey Jr. (R)
- Delegate(s): Steven J. Arentz (R); Jefferson L. Ghrist (R); Jay A. Jacobs (R)
- Registration: 45.6% Republican; 33.2% Democratic; 19.7% unaffiliated
- Demographics: 79.6% White; 9.2% Black/African American; 0.3% Native American; 1.2% Asian; 0.0% Hawaiian/Pacific Islander; 3.2% Other race; 6.4% Two or more races; 6.5% Hispanic
- Population (2020): 129,429
- Voting-age population: 101,733
- Registered voters: 90,062

Maryland Legislative District 36 is one of 47 districts in the state for the Maryland General Assembly. It covers Kent County, Queen Anne's County, and parts of Caroline County and Cecil County. The district is represented by three delegates in the Maryland House of Delegates.

== Demographic characteristics ==
As of the 2020 United States census, the district had a population of 129,429, of whom 101,733 (78.6%) were of voting age. The racial makeup of the district was 103,031 (79.6%) White, 11,859 (9.2%) African American, 414 (0.3%) Native American, 1,613 (1.2%) Asian, 40 (0.0%) Pacific Islander, 4,190 (3.2%) from some other race, and 8,282 (6.4%) from two or more races. Hispanic or Latino of any race were 8,428 (6.5%) of the population.

The district had 90,062 registered voters as of October 17, 2020, of whom 17,728 (19.7%) were registered as unaffiliated, 41,025 (45.6%) were registered as Republicans, 29,927 (33.2%) were registered as Democrats, and 766 (0.9%) were registered to other parties.

== Political representation ==
The district is represented for the 2023–2027 legislative term in the State Senate by Stephen S. Hershey Jr. (R) and in the House of Delegates by Steven J. Arentz (R), Jefferson L. Ghrist (R) and Jay A. Jacobs (R).

== History ==
=== 1994 redistricting ===
On January 14, 1994, Maryland was ordered to submit a plan for a new African American majority district on the Eastern Shore following Marylanders for Fair Representation, Inc. v. Schaefer. The U.S. District Court approved a plan to alter the boundaries of former legislative districts 36, 37, and 38, beginning with the 1994 general election. Following this plan, Kent County, Queen Anne's County and parts of Caroline County, Cecil County and Talbot County were provisioned for district 36.
