= Maryland State Board of Education =

The Maryland State Board of Education is the governing and policy-making body of the Maryland Department of Education.

== History ==
In 1812, Maryland state began to raise money for a Free School Fund by taxing the renewal of bank charters (Chapter 79, Acts of 1812), and in 1864 appointed Libertus Van Bokkelen as the first Maryland State Superintendent of Public Instruction.

=== List of Maryland state superintendents of public instruction ===
- Libertus Van Bokkelen (1864)
- Lillian M. Lowery (July 2012 to September, 2015)
- Nancy Grasmick (1991 until June 30, 2011)
- Carey M. Wright

=== Elections ===
Elections are held for seats on the 24 school districts, 23 counties and Baltimore cit. Seats have a regular term length of 4 years. Elections are held the same day of elections of United States presidential election in Maryland.

== See also ==
- California State Board of Education
- Chicago Board of Education
- Montgomery County Public Schools (Maryland)
