= Delaware Department of Education =

State agency of Delaware, United States

State education agency overview
- Jurisdiction: Delaware
- Headquarters: Dover, Delaware
- State education agency executive: Susan Bunting
- Website: Delaware Department of Education

The Delaware Department of Education (DEDOE) is the state education agency of Delaware. It is headquartered in the John G. Townsend Building in Dover, with auxiliary offices in the John W. Collette Education Resource Center in Dover. The current secretary of the Delaware DOE is Cindy Marten. Susan Bunting served as secretary of the Delaware Department of Education beginning in 2017 and ending in 2022, and was replaced by Mark Holodick, who served from 2022 to 2025. From 2012 to 2017, Mark Murphy served as secretary of education, succeeding Lillian M. Lowery who served as superintendent from 2009 before resigning to become superintendent of the Maryland State Department of Education in 2012.
