= St. Timothy's Hall =

Former theological all-boys school in Catonsville, Maryland, US

Location
- 200 Ingleside Avenue; Catonsville, Maryland 21228; United States

Information
- Type: Private boarding school
- Religious affiliation: Christian
- Established: 1847
- Founders: George Worthington; Adolphus Frost
- Closed: 1864
- Grades: 1–9
- Gender: Single (Male)
- Enrollment: 218 students (1860)

St. Timothy's Hall was an eight-year private all-boys theological and military boarding school in Catonsville, Maryland for boys ages seven to fourteen. The boys' school closed in 1864, and the building was then used as a girls' school and as a boarding house. The building burned down in July 1872.

== History ==
St. Timothy's Hall was originally established as a theological school by Reverend George Worthington and Reverend Adolphus Frost, along with rector Reverend Dr. Libertus Van Bokkelen. It became the first church military school in the United States. The school was chartered and incorporated in 1847 and by 1850, there were 132 students and fourteen teachers. The Hall itself was an imposing three-story stone and wood frame build with an H-shaped footprint that contained both classrooms and dormitory rooms. It is possibly the first religiously affiliated military school in the country.

Additionally, there was a gymnasium and an armory to the rear of the Hall. Most of the students boarded at St. Timothy's and the few remaining students arrived daily by carriage. All were required to wear gray uniforms for the winter and brown and white for the summer. In 1853, each ten-month session cost $250, which included board, tuition, fuel, light, washing, and mending. According to the terms laid out by Rev. Van Bokkelen, "Modern Languages, when studied in connexion {sic} with the Classics, Music and Drawing, are Extra Charges. For $300 a Pupil receives all the advantages of the School, including Modern Languages, Music and Drawing."

St. Timothy's was considered to be one of the best schools in the South. It was one of the first schools to have a gymnasium and a specialized gym teacher. Students were organized into battalions of infantry and artillery corps. The state furnished muskets, cannons, and other equipment.

St. Timothy's Hall prospered, with attendance reaching 218 students by 1860. The success of the school was seriously diminished with the onset of the Civil War and the loss of the South's support. By 1864, the military school was closed and the building was rented for use as a Christian preparatory school for girls. However, by 1871, after Reverend Libertus Van Bokkelen's retirement, the Hall was rented as a boarding house, attracting people from Baltimore who wished to leave the city during the summer months. On July 29, 1872, the Hall and an adjoining storehouse were destroyed by fire. Reduced to a pile of rubble, the stone was purchased by the Odd Fellows Hall building committee for the construction of Newburg Hall at the corner of Frederick Road and Newburg Avenue.

Although the school's rector was a Unionist sympathizer and friendly to African Americans, many of the schools students left to join the Confederacy. Van Bokkelen became the first Maryland State Superintendent of Public Instruction in 1864.

== Notable alumni ==
- John Wilkes Booth, assassin of President Abraham Lincoln
- Michael O'Laughlen, conspirator in the assassination of President Lincoln
- Samuel Arnold, conspirator in the assassination of President Lincoln
- Wade Hampton III, Civil War general
- Fitzhugh Lee, Civil War general and Robert E. Lee's nephew
- Bishop John Henry Ducachet Wingfield, missionary bishop of Northern California
- Jacob Edwin Michael, Noted obstetrician and best player in the first college football game
- Stephen Elliott Jr., Civil War general for the Confederate States of America
- Charles E. Phelps, Civil War general for the Union
