= Maryland State Superintendent of Public Instruction =

The Maryland State Superintendent of Public Instruction is the nonpartisan (originally partisan) elected executive officer of the Maryland Department of Education, appointed by the Maryland State Board of Education.

== History ==
Libertus Van Bokkelen was the first Maryland State superintendent of Public Instruction in 1864. He headed the development, supervision and advising of public school systems for the various counties, and funded the new Maryland State Normal School (MSNS).

Lillian M. Lowery served as superintendent of the Maryland State Department of Education from July 2012 to September, 2015.

Nancy Grasmick served as superintendent of the Maryland State Department of Education from 1991 until June 30, 2011.

Carey M. Wright is the current Maryland superintendent of Schools.
