= Lou Grasmick =

American baseball player (1924-2016)

- Pitcher
- Born: September 11, 1924; Baltimore, Maryland, US
- Died: May 26, 2016 (aged 91); Baltimore, Maryland, US
- Batted: Right Threw: Right

MLB debut
- April 22, 1948, for the Philadelphia Phillies

Last MLB appearance
- April 24, 1948, for the Philadelphia Phillies

MLB statistics
- Win–loss record: 0–0
- Earned run average: 7.20
- Strikeouts: 2
- Stats at Baseball Reference

Teams
- Philadelphia Phillies (1948)

Louis Junior Grasmick (September 11, 1924 – May 26, 2016) was an American businessman, philanthropist, and professional baseball pitcher, who played in Major League Baseball (MLB) for the 1948 Philadelphia Phillies.

A Baltimore native, Grasmick was married to former Maryland School Superintendent Nancy Grasmick and lived for many years in Phoenix, Maryland. Long active in Baltimore political and business circles, he often worked closely with former Maryland Governors William Donald Shaefer and Robert Ehrlich on various development projects. Ehrlich recalled that Grasmick was a "very principled, very tough guy".

== Baseball career ==
In 1944, Grasmick signed with the Philadelphia Phillies, for a $500 bonus. He appeared in two major league games, during the 1948 Phillies season, pitching five innings in relief. During his playing days, he batted and threw right-handed, while standing 6 feet (1.83 m) tall and weighing 195 pounds (88 kg).

Grasmick made his Minor League Baseball (MiLB) debut, in 1943. He moved through various teams’ farm systems, throughout the war years. Grasmick won 12 games for the Terre Haute Phillies, in 1947.

Grasmick was treated roughly in his big league debut, on April 22, 1948, against the eventual National League (NL) champion Boston Braves, allowing three earned runs, three bases on balls, and two hits, in one inning. Two days later, Grasmick allowed one run in four innings pitched against the Brooklyn Dodgers (on a home run to Arky Vaughan), but did allow two inherited runners to score, in an 11–4 Phillies defeat. Grasmick then returned to MiLB for the rest of his career. A single in his only Phillies at bat left him with a rare MLB career batting average of 1.000.

When once asked about knockdown pitches, Grasmick stated: "If you didn't throw a knockdown, you were going to have problems with your teammates. You were expected to protect them. If the other pitcher threw at one for your players, then you had to square the account. It was the way the game was played. A different era now. And players then didn't have protective helmets."

== Business ==
Grasmick, who dropped out of school in the eighth grade and learned the lumber business as a teenager while living in Baltimore's Hamilton neighborhood, founded the Louis J. Grasmick Lumber Company in 1951. Since then, it has grown to be one of the largest lumber suppliers on the East Coast of the United States. The company initially focused on development of business within the local maritime community. It diversified by expanding to serve industrial and manufacturing plants, residential and commercial construction, bridge and highway building, and more. Some of the projects in which the company has participated include:

- The National Aquarium – Baltimore, Maryland
- Baltimore World Trade Center
- Oriole Park at Camden Yards – Baltimore, Maryland
- The Chicago Stadium – Chicago, Illinois
- Dulles International Airport – Arlington, Virginia
- Smithsonian Museum of Natural History – Washington, D.C.
- MCI Sports Arena – Washington, D.C.
- U.S.S. Constellation refurbishment – Baltimore, Maryland
- Washington National Baseball Park – Washington, D.C.
- Freedom Tower (at the site of the former Twin Towers) – NYC
- Reconstruction of the Pentagon (post 9/11/01) – Arlington, Virginia

=== Roles and Titles ===
- Served as the Chief Executive Officer of Grasmick Lumber Company, Inc.
- Was a Director of Harbor Bankshares Corp. beginning in 1992 and its subsidiary, Harbor Bank of Maryland, since 1982.
- Was a Director of Capricor Therapeutics, Inc. since 2006.
- Served as a Director of The Johns Hopkins Hospital Broccoli Center.

== Philanthropy ==
Grasmick had ties to many community organizations in Baltimore through both volunteerism and philanthropy. He planned and delivered the Anchorage in Boston Street back when Canton was a "rat-infested dump". He was an investor in Inner Harbor East, Baltimore. Grasmick's lumber company participated in the rebuilding of the Pentagon following the 9/11 terrorist attacks. His firm also led the B&O Transportation Museum's roof rehabilitation project. Grasmick was quoted as saying, "There are ways to give back to the community other than money. You probably have a following, whether it's friends and families or coworkers. We all have followings. To be a good leader, decide to take the role of motivating those followers with energy and ideas." He also coached American Legion Baseball teams in the Lutherville, Maryland, area during the 1960s.

=== Activities ===
- 1992 – Founded House With a Heart Foundation – dedicated to the betterment of the lives of needy Marylanders.
- 1994 – Co-Chaired Paul Anka Concert ($50,000.00 for Signal 13)
- 1995 – Co-Chaired Eddy Arnold Concert ($30,000.00 for Childhood Learning Disabilities)
- 1997 – Chaired "Minds Across America" raising funds to purchase 100,000 books for needy children
- 1998 – Chaired 007 Tomorrow Never Dies Movie Premier raising $250,000.00 for Johns Hopkins Broccoli Center
- 2003 – Chaired 007 Die Another Day Movie Premier raising $300,000.00 for Johns Hopkins Broccoli Center.
- 2004 – Louis and his wife Nancy Grasmick donated $1 Million to Hopkins Heart Institute
- 2005 – Capital Campaign for the Johns Hopkins Heart Center
- 2005 – Louis and his wife Nancy Grasmick donated a second $1 Million to Hopkins Heart Institute
- 2009 – The Children's Guild of Maryland – Honored with their annual award for making the impossible possible

== Awards and honors ==
- Voted "Man of the Year" by both the Baltimore Junior Association of Commerce and the Variety Club
- Awarded "Making the Impossible Possible" by the Children's Guild of Maryland in 2009
- Honors from the following organizations:
  - The B'nai B'rith
  - Boumi Shrine
  - Epicurean Society
  - Youth for Christ Organization
  - The Save-A-Heart Foundation
  - The Fraternal Order of Police
  - Project Survival
