= Ethan Allen (priest) =

American Episcopal priest and author (1796-1879)

- Born: 1796; Plymouth County, Massachusetts, U.S.
- Died: November 17, 1879 (aged 82–83); Newport, Kentucky, U.S.
- Occupations: Priest, historian

Ethan Allen (1796 – November 17, 1879) was an Episcopal priest and author, the first historian of the Episcopal Diocese of Maryland.

== Early life and education ==
Born in Plymouth County, Massachusetts, in 1796, Ethan Allen was a grandson of the Puritan John Alden Allen and cousin of Ethan Allen, the famous revolutionary. Raised in a Congregational church, Allen graduated from Middlebury College in Vermont in 1818. He moved to Maryland, joined the Episcopal Church and became lay reader at Trinity Church, Upper Marlboro. He later earned a doctorate of divinity degree.

== Ministry ==
Bishop James Kemp ordained Allen a priest in 1819. After serving at St. John's parish in Prince George's County for several years, in 1823 Allen became rector of Christ Church, Washington Parish, in the District of Columbia. When Bishop Kemp died unexpectedly in 1827, the diocese was divided as to his successor and their choice refused to move to the state. Eventually, the diocesan convention of 1830 settled upon William Murray Stone, a native of Somerset County and slaveholder.

As Stone began what would become his decade-long episcopate, Allen moved to Ohio (by its constitution a slavery-free state), where he became a missionary under Bishop Philander Chase. He planted churches in Troy (1831), Springfield (1833), Hamilton (1835) and Dayton, where he served from 1839 until 1843. Allen then moved to Cincinnati, where he revitalized Trinity Church in 1844, but three years later the congregation had difficulty meeting its mortgage payments.

Allen returned to Maryland in 1847, seven years after another Maryland diocesan stalemate had led to the election of William R. Whittingham of New Jersey and the General Theological Seminary as bishop. Slavery remained an issue dividing Episcopalians and the country, and like Bishop Kemp, Bishop Whittingham was known for his evangelism, as well as solicitude toward African Americans (both free and slave). Allen become rector of St. John's in the Valley (also known as Western Run parish, Baltimore County, founded 1829). In 1855 he transferred to the nearby historic St. Thomas' parish, Garrison Forest (founded 1744).

In 1855, Allen published Maryland Toleration: or Sketches of the early History of Maryland to the year 1650 and registered his copyright to that work in the Clerk's Office of the U.S. District Court for the District of Connecticut. The volume traced Maryland's religious history from the voyages of Capt. John Smith and Virginia colonists around Chesapeake Bay, to the founding of the Catholic colony by Fr. Andrew White and others and the ensuing sectarian violence, ultimately resolved in a policy of religious toleration among Anglicans, Catholics, Presbyterians and others as documented in acts of the Maryland colonial Assembly session of 1649. The scholarly Allen also preached the diocesan convention sermon in 1855 and joined the diocesan standing committee, where he served as agent for diocesan missions.

An ally of Bishop Whittingham for more than 25 years, Allen also became the diocese's first historian, and found and preserved old parish records. In 1860, he published Clergy in Maryland of the Protestant Episcopal Church through the same publisher, which came to be relied upon by generations of historians, but which criticized the diocese for its reliance upon clergy born outside its boundaries (most like himself, Northerners). In 1861, he wrote a report to Thomas Holliday Hicks which helped convince Maryland's legislators not to secede from the Union.

Allen also wrote a number of sketches of early Maryland clergy (including the Rev. Thomas Bacon) and parishes (including St. Anne's parish in Annapolis). His history of Shrewsbury Parish in Cecil County was prefaced by a quote from Ecclesiasticus XLIV:9-10, "And some there be who have no memorial ... but these were merciful men, whose righteousness hath not been forgotten."

== Family ==
Allen had several children. A descendant, Col. William Allen, principal of McDonogh School near his former Garrison Forest Parish, attempted to edit his papers.

== Death and legacy ==
After the Civil War, Allen moved to Kentucky, from where on December 31, 1869, he advised Bishop Whittingham about the controversy surrounding the Diocese of Kentucky's assistant bishop, George David Cummins, whose fervent opposition to the Anglo-Catholicism of the Oxford Movement eventually led him to withdraw from the Episcopal Church and found the Reformed Episcopal Church. Allen died, aged 83, on November 17, 1879, in Newport, Kentucky, whose St. Paul's Episcopal Church had been built in 1871, across the Ohio River from the church he had reestablished in Cincinnati three decades earlier. A memorial lecture was delivered in his honor to the Maryland diocesan convention.

In 1869, the Diocese of Maryland bought many records that Allen had preserved, which with Bishop Whittingham's papers, remain at the diocesan archives in Baltimore. Others are at the Library of Congress and at the Maryland State Archives in Annapolis.

== Publications ==
- Maryland toleration : or, Sketches of the early history of Maryland, to the year 1650 ... (Baltimore, J.S. Waters, 1855)
- Clergy in Maryland of the Protestant Episcopal Church since the independence of 1783(Baltimore, J.S. Waters, 1860)
- Report of the Rev. Dr. Ethan Allen, in relation to records of the Executive department to Thomas Holliday Hicks (Frederick, 1861)
- A discourse prepared for the National Fast Day June 1st, 1865 : on account of the murder of our late president, and preached at St. Thomas' Church, Homestead, Baltimore County, Md
- Rev. Thomas Bacon (New York, N.S. Richardson, 1865)
- Who were the early settlers of Maryland (a paper read before the "Maryland Historical Society," at its meeting held Thursday evening, October 5, 1865).
- (with Libertus Van Bokkelen), The history of Maryland, to which are added brief biographies of distinguished statesmen, philanthropists, theologians, etc.; prepared for the schools of Maryland (Philadelphia, E. H. Butler, 1866, 1886 and 1897)
