= Libertus Van Bokkelen =

Reverend and first Maryland school superintendent

Rev. Dr. Libertus Van Bokkelen
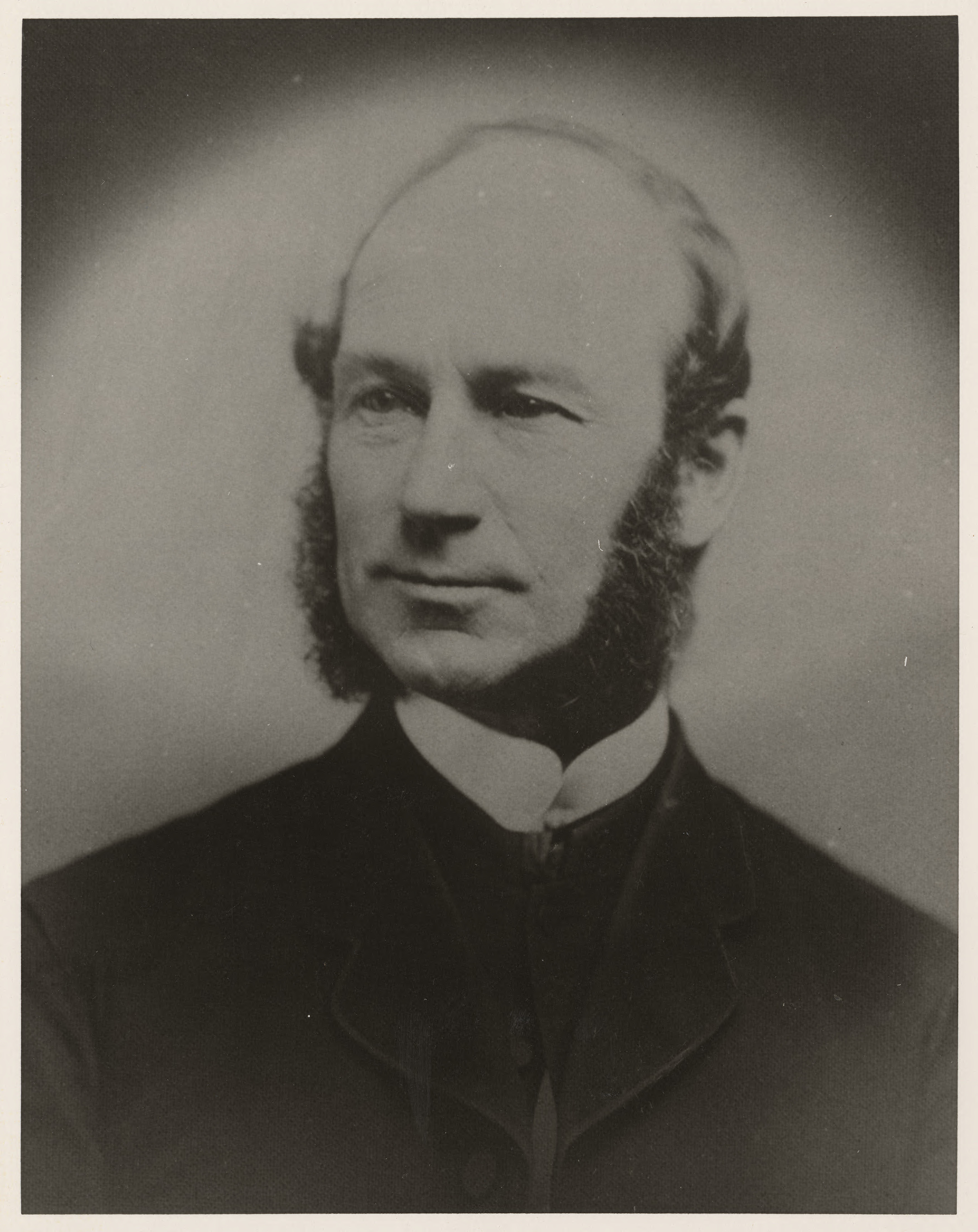
- Born: July 22, 1815; New York City, New York
- Died: November 1, 1889 (aged 74)
- Occupation: Maryland State Superintendent of Schools
- Spouse: Abigail D'arcy
- Children: 5

Libertus Van Bokkelen (July 22, 1815 – November 1, 1889) was a reverend in the Protestant Episcopal Church and the first Superintendent of the Maryland State Department of Education.

== Early life ==
He was born on July 22, 1815 in New York City. He was the second oldest in a family of thirteen children. His paternal grandfather emigrated to the United States from Holland in 1796, having ben exiled from the French government for his support for the House of Orange-Nassau.

From nine years old, he received his education at various boarding schools, including the Union Academy in Long Island and the Flushing Institute in Flushing, Queens, where he was taught by Reverend William Augustus Muhlenberg.

== Career ==
=== Early career ===
When he was 22, he helped establish St. Paul's College in College Point in Long Island, along with Reverend William Augustus Muhlenberg. The school later became the Preparatory School of St. Paul's College.

In 1842, at age 27, he took Holy Orders at the Protestant Episcopal Church. He would later on combine the roles of his minister work with that of his educational work.

=== Educational career in Maryland ===
In 1845, he became rector of St. Timothy's Church in Catonsville, Maryland. He then helped establish St. Timothy's Hall there, which became one of the best private schools in the South, with distinguished alumni such as John Wilkes Booth, four Civil War generals, and Bishop John Henry Ducachet Wingfield. It was the first theological military academy in the country. Van Bokkelen baptized John Wilkes Booth at the school.

Van Bokkelen was known by some students at the school as "Mr. Pan" for his flute playing ability, although John Wilkes Booth, who also played the flute, only referred to him as "Van." He was a strict disciplinarian, publishing a list of 99 rules that included prohibitions on drinking, smoking, firearms, playing cards, and swearing.

During his time at St. Timothy's, he also served other churches, including churches in Elkridge Landing and Ellicott City, Maryland until those churches became self-supporting.

He was offered and declined positions in several states, including Tennessee, Missouri, and California. He was also offered and declined a position as President of St. John's College (Annapolis/Santa Fe) and the Agricultural School near Bladensburg, Maryland.

He was the School Commissioner for the First District of Baltimore County Public Schools from 1859 to 1965 and acted as Visitor of the Catonsville school.

He was a Union sympathizer during the American Civil War. In 1861, when the Union troops went through Baltimore and the citizens were getting ready to defend their positions, they went for the cannons at St. Timothy's Hall. To their dismay, the cannons had been "spiked," which credit has been given to Reverend Van Bokkelen. He had been planning to expand the school in 1861, but those plans did not come to fruition as most of the students were part of the Confederate States Army.

He was a steadfast abolitionist. In speaking after the Civil War, he stated, "Thank god I have lived to see slavery abolished, and America the home of the free!"

In 1864, he left St. Timothy's Hall because of conflicts with the Confederate sympathizing patrons of the school, and accepted a position at St. Stephen's Episcopal Church in Pittsfield, Massachusetts. Major General Lew Wallace proclaimed that no services would be held at St. Timothy's Church again except by a "successor of undoubted loyalty."

In 1864, the Maryland Committee on Education of the new third Maryland Constitution of 1864 started the Maryland State System on Public Schools and created the position of Maryland State Superintendent of Public Instruction. The chairman of the committee, Hon. Joseph M. Cushing personally had Van Bokkelen in mind when creating the position, and Governor Augustus Bradford appointed him as the first superintendent of the Maryland public school system.

He was also principal ex officio for the Maryland State Normal School (later called Towson University) from 1864 until 1867. The Normal School was an educational institution for the instruction of teachers.

The Maryland constitution provided that the state superintendent of public schools had to, within thirty days, provide a report on the uniform system of free public schools. He studied both private and public school systems in New Britain, Connecticut, Boston, Albany, and New York City. He submitted his report to the Maryland Legislature on February 2, 1865. His plan was to have a uniform system of public schools that would allow students to be admitted into any of the public schools in the state, and a uniform curriculum in science, the classics, and mathematics, with the added ability to add other specialties, which would allow for admission into higher education pursuits in Law, Medicine, and the Mechanical Departments of the State University. His higher education plans never came to fruition, but his plans for public schools form the basis of Maryland's public school system today.

At the December 5, 1867, meeting of the Maryland Association of School Commissioners, when it became official that the connection with the public school system would end soon, they made a Resolution which stated

"It is our firm belief, that when these sources of misunderstanding shall have passed away, the name of Dr. Libertus Van Bokkelen will be placed as high as the highest on the list of men identified in America with its greatest glory - free popular education."

He helped colored schools gain much needed funding. He was met with great opposition for his advocacy for colored schools to utilize taxes for their funding. As a result of his advocacy, between 1866 and 1869, Anne Arundel County Colored Schools received funds and teachers from the New England Freedman’s aid Society, the American Missionary Association, and others. In Anne Arundel County, colored schools received the greatest assistance from the Baltimore Association for the Moral and Educational Improvement of the Colored People, for which Van Bokkelen was a member.

=== Later career outside Maryland ===
He was further involved in education outside of Maryland. In 1866, he was elected Director of the National Teachers Association, the predecessor to the National Education Association. He then became Secretary of the NTA in 1868 and then President in 1869.

In 1871, he became rector of the St. John's Protestant Episcopal Church and head of the Jane Grey School at Mount Morris, New York, a Village near Buffalo, New York. In 1873, he was appointed rector of the Trinity Church in Buffalo, which position he held for twelve years. In Buffalo, he was a leading advocate for Civil Rights Reform and a member of the Society for the Promotion of Religion and Learning.

== Family and death ==
In 1852 he married Amelia D'Arcy and they had five children. One of his sons became a minister like him. After his first wife's death in 1885, he married Naomi Macey Clark of Niagara NY.

He died on All Saints' Day, November 1, 1889 and was buried in Chicago.

== Legacy ==
On May 25, 1960, Towson University named the former Lida Lee Tall Building after Van Bokkelen. It is now known as Van Bokkelen Hall.

Van Bokkelen Elementary School in Severn, Maryland is named after him. The school was dedicated in 1973.

He received honorary degrees of Doctor of Laws from Lafayette College and Franklin & Marshall College in Pennsylvania.

== Publications ==
- (with Ethan Allen (priest)), The history of Maryland, to which are added brief biographies of distinguished statesmen, philanthropists, theologians, etc.; prepared for the schools of Maryland (Philadelphia, E. H. Butler, 1866)

== Further links ==
- Towson
