= Carey Wright =

American educator

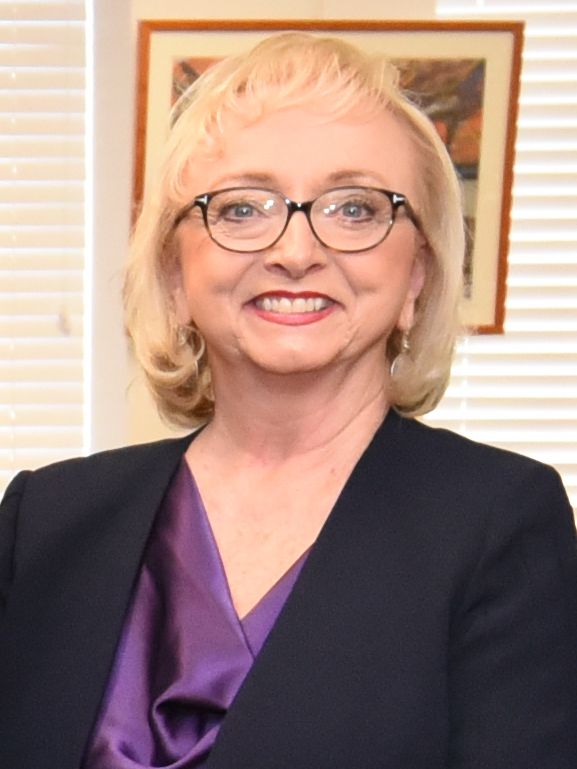
- Wright in 2024

Maryland Superintendent of Schools
- Incumbent
- Assumed office July 1, 2024; Interim: October 23, 2023 – June 30, 2024
- Governor: Wes Moore
- Preceded by: Mohammed Choudhury

Mississippi Superintendent of Education
- In office November 1, 2013 – June 30, 2022
- Governor: Phil Bryant; Tate Reeves
- Preceded by: Lynn House (interim)
- Succeeded by: Kim Benton (interim)

Personal details
- Born: Prince George's County, Maryland, U.S.
- Education: University of Maryland, College Park (BA, MEd, EdD)

Carey M. Wright is an American educator and consultant who has served as the Maryland Superintendent of Schools since 2023. She previously served as the Mississippi Superintendent of Education from 2013 to 2022, the state's first female state superintendent.

Starting her education career in Maryland, she became superintendent for Montgomery County Public Schools's Office of Special Education and Student Services and chief academic officer and deputy chief of the District of Columbia Public Schools's Office of Teaching and Learning. In 2013, she became state superintendent of education for the Mississippi Department of Education, implementing reforms dubbed the "Mississippi Miracle", when the state had the United States's fastest-improving math and literacy scores. She oversaw the expansion of the state's digital learning strategy amid the COVID-19 pandemic. As Maryland's Superintendent of Schools, she oversees the implementation of Blueprint for Maryland's Future.

== Background ==
Wright was born and raised in Prince George's County, Maryland. She attended the University of Maryland, College Park, where she earned her Bachelor of Arts, Master of Education, and Doctor of Education degrees.

Wright started her teaching career in September 1972 as a teacher in the Prince George's County Public Schools system. She was later employed with Howard County Public Schools, becoming principal of elementary schools and director of special education. She was an associate superintendent for Montgomery County Public Schools's Office of Special Education and Student Services from May 2003 to August 2009, then served as the chief academic officer and deputy chief of the District of Columbia Public Schools's Office of Teaching and Learning until May 2013. She has worked as a consultant for the Harvard Business School's Public Education Leadership Project since 2008 and has run a consulting company, Wright Approach Consulting, since 2013.

== Mississippi Superintendent of Education ==
In September 2013, Wright became the state superintendent of education for the Mississippi Department of Education. She was the first woman to serve as permanent state superintendent and was the longest-serving superintendent in state history.

Wright earned a national reputation for implementing reforms that led to the "Mississippi Miracle", a period in which the state's math and literacy scores became the fastest-improving in the United States. She oversaw the implementation of the state's Literacy-Based Promotion Act of 2013, which retained third-grade students with low reading proficiency skills, and the Early Learning Collaborative Act, which provided additional funding to school districts that collaborated with Head Start to provide prekindergarten programs to four-year-olds. Wright provided educators with teaching coaches, training programs, and high-quality instructional materials, highlighted individual schools and districts that achieved success through promotional videos and tours, and promoted the "science of reading" to teachers through evidence-based reading instruction. According to the Urban Institute and the National Assessment of Educational Progress, Mississippi fourth graders had gone from ranking among the worst in the nation for reading proficiency in 2013 to ranking above the national average and were among the top readers nationwide by 2022.

In May 2016, after the U.S. Department of Education issued guidelines requiring school systems to allow students to use restrooms and locker rooms consistent with their gender identity, Wright initially said that she would abide by the federal guidelines but later said that she would take no action and continue adhering to the Religious Liberty Accommodations Act following pressure from Republican state lawmakers and Governor Phil Bryant.

In March 2020, amid school closures from the COVID-19 pandemic, Wright called on the Mississippi State Board of Education to cancel state testing requirements for the 2019–2020 school year; the board voted to do so a few days later. In May 2020, Wright unveiled a $250 million digital learning plan to the Mississippi Legislature that would focus on providing students with laptops or tablets and WiFi access, training teachers and technology staff, and designing curriculum for eight high-quality programs; the digital learning plan was included in the state's Equity in Distance Learning Act, which passed and became law without Governor Tate Reeves's signature. Wright retired as state superintendent in June 2022; Mississippi students' performance has continued to improve since her retirement.

== Maryland Superintendent of Schools ==
On October 4, 2023, the Maryland State Board of Education named Wright as its interim superintendent of public schools. Her interim status was made permanent in April 2024. As the Superintendent of Schools, Wright will oversee the implementation of the Blueprint for Maryland's Future, a multi-billion dollar education reform plan passed by the legislature in 2020, and seek to improve the state's proficiency rates in reading and mathematics, and repeat many of the reforms she helped implement in Mississippi.

In July 2024, Wright proposed reforms to Maryland's literacy policy that would require students who fail to meet state reading standards by the end of the third grade to be held back. Following backlash from parents, education advocates, and members of the Maryland State Board of Education, the proposed rule was adjusted to require a student's parents to agree to enroll their child into free supplemental reading support programs to advance to the fourth grade if they fail to meet state reading standards, after which it was approved by the board in an 11–1 vote.

During the 2025 legislative session, Wright testified in support of Moore's proposed cuts to the Blueprint for Maryland's Future.

In January 2025, after the Trump administration withdrew a policy prohibiting Immigration and Customs Enforcement (ICE) agents from arresting undocumented immigrants at protected areas such as schools and day cares, Wright issued guidance to Maryland's school districts advising them to train their staff on how to respond to ICE raids at their schools and encouraged undocumented families to update their emergency contact information at schools. In February 2025, after acting Assistant Secretary of Education for Civil Rights Craig Trainor sent out a "Dear Colleague" letter advising schools to end race-based programming or risk losing federal funding, Wright told Maryland superintendents that they did not have to abandon race-based efforts in schools, telling Maryland Matters in an interview that "the Dear Colleague letters do not carry the weight of law, so they are not the same thing as statute".

Political offices
Preceded by Mohammed Choudhury	Maryland Superintendent of Schools; 2023–present	Incumbent
Preceded by Lynn House (interim)	Mississippi Superintendent of Education; 2013–2022	Succeeded by Kim Benton (interim)
