= Lillian M. Lowery =

American politician (1954–2022)

Personal details
- Born: 1954 Gastonia, North Carolina, U.S.
- Died: April 13, 2022 (aged 67–68) Yardley, Pennsylvania, U.S.
- Occupation: Superintendent, Maryland State Department of Education (2012-2015), Secretary, Delaware Department of Education (2009-2012)

Lillian M. Lowery (1954 – April 13, 2022) was an American government official and educator who served as Superintendent of the Maryland State Department of Education in the Cabinet of Governors Martin O'Malley and Larry Hogan from July 2012 to September, 2015.

Lowery was born in Gastonia, North Carolina. Her educational background includes a B.A. in English from North Carolina Central University, an M.A. in curriculum and instruction from the University of North Carolina at Charlotte, and an Ed.D. in education and policy studies from Virginia Tech.

Following completion of her master's degree in 1978, Lowery became a middle school English teacher in the Gaston County Schools in Gastonia, North Carolina, before moving on to a similar position in the Alexandria City Public Schools in Alexandria, Virginia, in 1984 where she served until 1988. From 1988 to 2002, she served in several positions within the Fairfax County Public Schools based in Fairfax, Virginia, including high school English teacher, assistant principal, minority student achievement monitor, and principal. In 2002, she became an Area Administrator for the Fort Wayne Community Schools in Fort Wayne, Indiana, serving in that post until 2004, when she returned to the Fairfax County Public Schools in order to serve as an Assistant Superintendent until 2006. From 2006 until her appointment as Secretary of the Delaware Department of Education in the Cabinet of Governor Jack Markell in 2009, she served as Superintendent of the Christina School District in Newark, Delaware.

Lowery served as Delaware Secretary of Education from 2009 until her appointment as Superintendent of the Maryland State Department of Education in 2012.

In September, 2015, Lowery resigned as Superintendent of the Maryland State Department of Education in order to become the first President and chief executive officer of FutureReady Columbus, a Columbus, Ohio–based non-profit organization specializing in early childhood education. In March, 2017, she was appointed vice president for PreK-12 Policy, Research, and Practice at The Education Trust, a Washington, D.C.–based national nonprofit organization working to identify and close opportunity and achievement gaps in K-12 education. In September, 2018, she became Vice President of Student and Teacher Assessments at the Princeton, New Jersey–based Educational Testing Service.

Lowery retired from Educational Testing Service in January 2022. and died three months later on April 13, 2022.
