= Nancy Grasmick =

American school superintendent (born 1939)

Dr. Nancy S. Grasmick
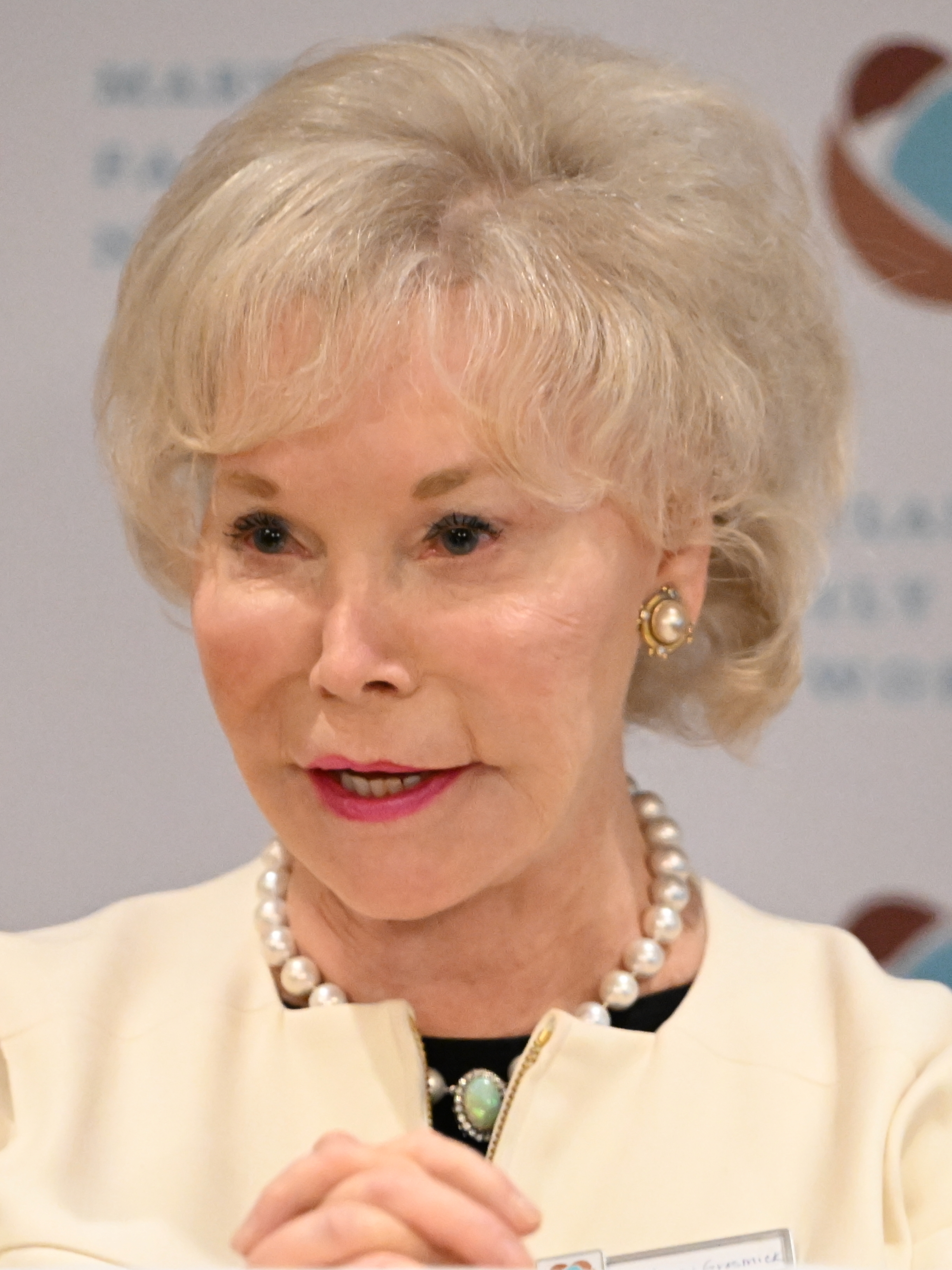
- Grasmick in 2024
- Born: 1939 (age 86–87); Baltimore, Maryland
- Occupation: Maryland State Superintendent of Schools (1991-2011)
- Spouse: Lou Grasmick (d. 2016)

Nancy S. Grasmick is the former Superintendent of the Maryland State Department of Education, serving from 1991 until June 30, 2011. Married to Baltimore businessman Lou Grasmick, who died in 2016, the couple also became active in various philanthropic endeavors.

== Early years and education ==
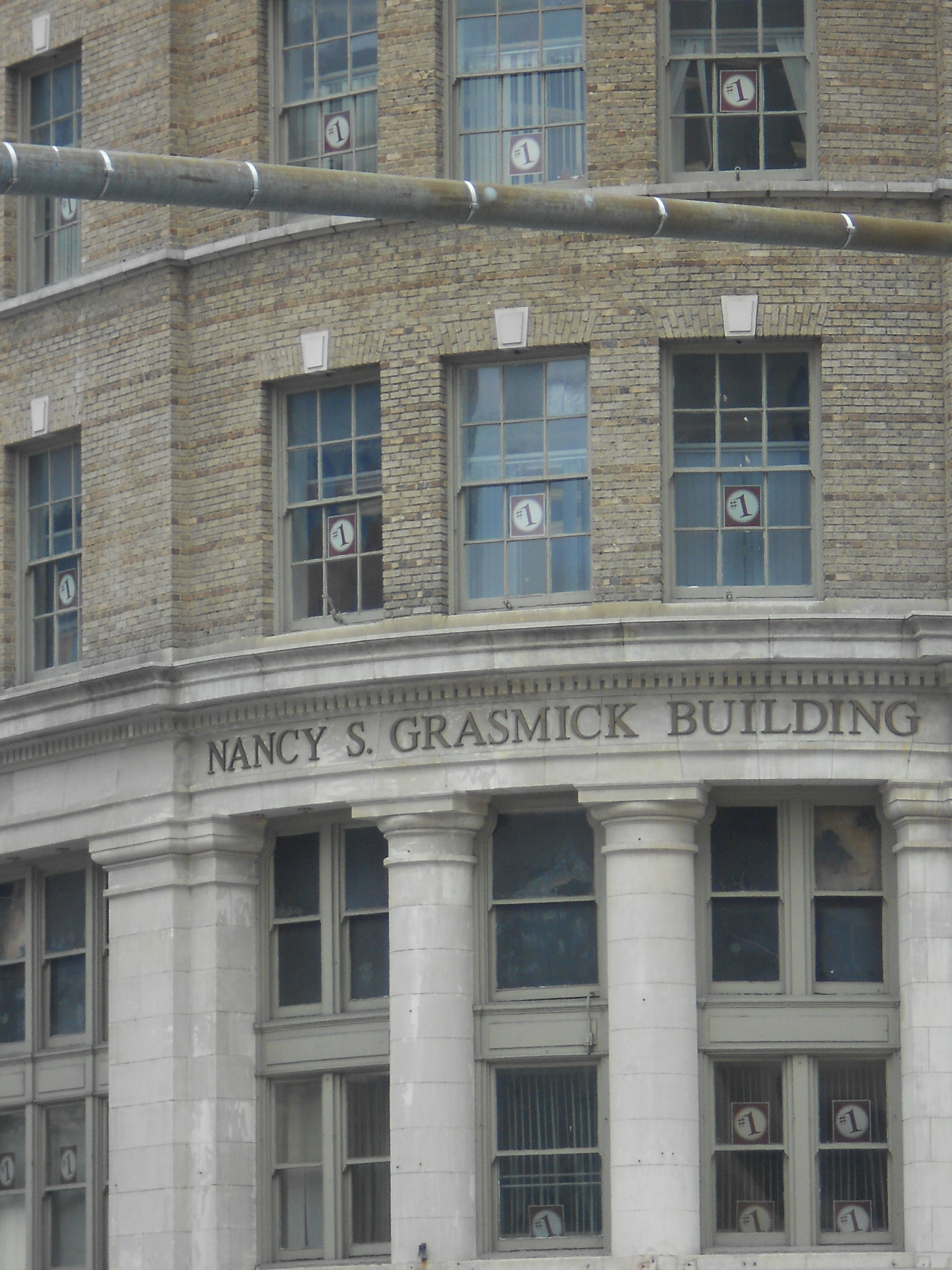
The headquarters building of the Maryland Higher Education Commission, at 6 North Liberty Street, is named for Nancy S. Grasmick

Born Nancy Streeks, Grasmick was raised in Baltimore's Forest Park neighborhood. While still a teenager attending Western High School, she had a bout of temporary deafness as a reaction to medication. She said later that she was inspired by the example of Helen Keller and decided to devote her life to education.

She received her doctorate from the Johns Hopkins University, her master's degree from Gallaudet University, and her bachelor's degree from Towson University.

== Career ==
Grasmick began as a teacher of deaf children at the William S. Baer School in the Baltimore City Public Schools. She subsequently served as a classroom and resource teacher, principal, supervisor, assistant superintendent, and associate superintendent in the Baltimore County Public Schools. In 1989, Governor William Donald Schaefer appointed her Special Secretary for Children, Youth, and Families and, in 1991, the State Board of Education appointed her State Superintendent of Schools. In 1997, Grasmick was elected as a fellow of the National Academy of Public Administration. In 2000, Grasmick was the recipient of the Harold W. McGraw, Jr., Prize in Education, awarded in recognition of her achievements as head of the Maryland School system.

In 2008, then-Governor Martin O'Malley unsuccessfully sought to replace Grasmick as Superintendent, calling her "a pawn of the Republican Party" because of her support of No Child Left Behind. At the time, Education Week ranked Maryland's schools third best in the U.S., based on several criteria. The effort ultimately failed, however, and she served for another three years, retiring at age 72 in June, 2011. By then, Education Week ranked Maryland's schools #1 in the nation.
