= Maryland State Department of Education =

State-level department of education for the State of Maryland

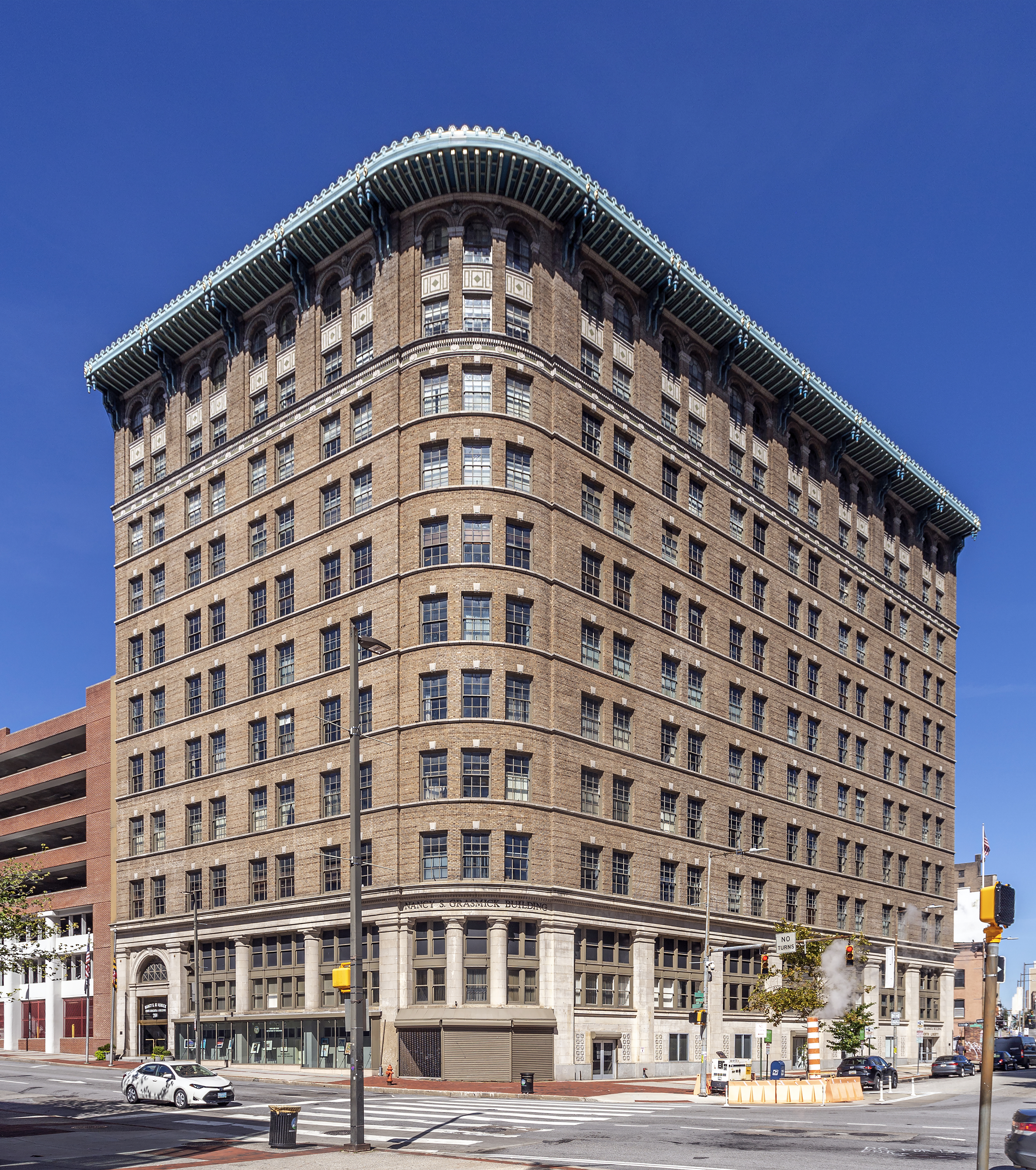
- Grasmick Building, the agency headquarters

Agency overview
- Formed: January 7, 1900; 126 years ago
- Jurisdiction: Maryland
- Headquarters: 200 West Baltimore Street, Baltimore, Maryland 21201; United States; 39°17′22″N 76°37′07″W
- Agency executive: Dr. Carey Wright, superintendent
- Parent agency: Government of Maryland
- Website: Official website

Map
- State of Maryland

Maryland State Department of Education (MSDE) is a division of the state government of Maryland in the United States. The agency oversees public school districts, which are 24 local school systems—one for each of Maryland's 23 counties plus one for Baltimore City. Maryland has more than 1,400 public schools in 24 public school systems, with a 2019 enrollment of approximately 900,000. Of the student body, 42% are on FARMS (i.e., qualify for Free And Reduced Meals) and 22% are Title 1 (i.e., schools with high percentages of poor children).

MSDE is led by the state superintendent of schools and receives guidance from the Maryland State Board of Education.

The agency is headquartered in downtown Baltimore at 200 West Baltimore Street (off North Liberty Street/Hopkins Place, just west of Charles Center) in the Nancy Grasmick Building.

The Maryland State Board of Education is responsible for the administration of the Standardized Testing and Reporting programs and the Academic Performance Students Index, which measures the academic performance and growth of schools on a variety of academic measures.

== School districts ==
The largest school districts in Maryland are:

Largest school districts
District	Students	Graduation rate	Ref
Montgomery County	165,000	89%	
Prince George's County	133,000	79%	
Baltimore County	114,000	88%	
Anne Arundel County	83,000	88%	
Baltimore City	79,000	70%	
Howard County	59,000	93%	
Frederick County	44,000	92%	

== History ==
=== 1800s ===
The first superintendent of schools for the State of Maryland was authorized in 1865 by the General Assembly of Maryland under the Maryland Constitution of 1864. The new appointive office continued to be supplemented later with the creation of a State Board of Education to supervise the various levels of activity in public education among the various then-22 counties of Maryland (plus Baltimore City - an independent municipality recognized with the status of a county) which all had widely different situations from the Appalachian Mountains and the Blue Ridge in the Western panhandle to the Chesapeake Bay and adjacent rural counties of the southern portion of the "Free State" to the Potomac River and the Eastern Shore (Delmarva peninsula) to the short North Atlantic Ocean coast. Several different funding levels and growing opportunities for elementary/grammar schools, intermediate/junior high/middle schools, and high schools/secondary education, with Baltimore City (public schools authorized by the state in 1826 and finally opened by the city in 1829 with first four schools (two boys and two girls). In 1839, a high school opened for boys only, known first as "The High School"; it is the third oldest public high school in the United States and the oldest in the state. The high school later became known as the Male High School in 1844 with the opening then of two public high schools for girls, Eastern and Western, then known as the "Central High School of Baltimore" since 1850 for near 20 years and finally renamed B.C.C. in 1868.

Then rural, sparsely populated Baltimore County instituted small one-room schools in wood-frame buildings beginning in the 1850s, supplementing the original colonial era "free schools" nominally established with only one in each of the counties. Baltimore County was second in the state with the first and only public high school in the newly purchased old Franklin Academy in Reisterstown becoming as Franklin High School in the 1850s. They were followed by secondary schools in the county seat of Towson as Towson High School in 1873.

A "Negro" / "Colored" (now African-American) elementary school was authorized in 1867, after a long controversy and public demand by the free black population of the, supplemented in 1883 by a "Colored High School" - second oldest in the nation next to Dunbar High School in Washington, D.C. Baltimore's new secondary school for its large free blacks population grew to be a crowning academic/cultural and social achievement for the formerly enslaved people over the following decades. The "Colored High" was later renamed Frederick Douglass High School in 1925, recalling its earliest beginnings as the independent private Douglass Institute founded in 1865, immediately after the Civil War on the 400 block of East Lexington Street, by Davis Street alley, on the north side around the corner from the Battle Monument from the War of 1812. It was located between North Calvert and North Streets (later renamed Guilford Avenue) in the former Newton University adjacent townhouse buildings. Founded in the 1840s, Newton's buildings served as a hospital for Union Army wounded in the recent strife. Former Baltimorean and escaped slave Frederick Douglass himself presided over the dedication ceremonies in September 1865 and later frequently lectured at the Institute. The Institute endured 18 years until the establishment by the City Schools system with a small struggling high school after continuous pressure and campaign for African-American schooling opportunities.

Then "polytechnical" / schools for "manual training" were founded in 1883, with the "Baltimore Manual Training School" (later renamed 1893 as the "Baltimore Polytechnic Institute" ("Poly").

=== 1900s ===
A second high school for Negroes was established in 1910 and, in the next decade, was renamed the Paul Laurence High School for East Baltimore. A new nationally popular lower form of secondary education with junior high schools for lower grades 7, 8, and 9 was instituted in 1920. Supplementing the four academic citywide single sex schools, then were neighborhood comprehensive "co-educational" ("co-ed") high schools opened-1922, beginning with (Forest Park High School in the northwest part of the city and later Southern High School by Federal Hill in old South Baltimore. New types of vocational-technical schools were established in the 1920s, reorganized and reconstructed in 1955 with Carver Vocational-Technical High School on Presstman Street in West Baltimore's Sandtown-Winchester neighborhood and followed by the merger of several previous vocational institutions and renamed as Mergenthaler Vocational-Technical High School on Hillen Road by Lake Montebello in the northeast city.

The state's practice of segregated schools ended in 1954, with the U.S. Supreme Court ruling in Brown v. Board of Education that segregated schools violated the U.S. Constitution.

The junior high schools were reorganized into middle schools lowered to include grades 6, 7, and 8 in the early 1980s, and surrounding suburban Baltimore County also led the way along with Anne Arundel County to the south of the city.

This slow growth of public education was later joined by Montgomery and Prince George's counties as the Washington, D.C. suburban region began reaching out into surrounding Maryland following World War II. By the 1970s, with the acceptance of various constitutional amendments to the old fourth and last/current 1867 Constitution of Maryland, from the various articles and sections submitted to the voters in various referendums after the failure of the newly revised 1967 Constitution proposed by the recent 1966 constitutional convention which was held to modernize the old 1867 Civil War era state charter, contained provisions to set up an executive cabinet-level Department of Education for the State, along with the revamped structure of state government under the governorship of Marvin Mandel, who reorganized the Maryland executive departments structure using the best of the 1966-1967 Constitutional elements by pushing them through "piece-meal" then passed by the General Assembly of Maryland (state legislature) of whom he was a long-time leader in the late 1960s and early 1970s.

== Rankings ==
In 2009, the Maryland state public schools system was ranked #1 in the nation overall as a result of three separate, independent studies conducted by publications Education Week, Newsweek, and MGT of America. Education Week ranked Maryland public education #1 in the nation for two years in a row, starting in 2008. "Education Week], the nation's leading education newspaper, looked at data in six critical categories over the past two years and placed Maryland's state education system at the top of national rankings. Maryland placed at the top of the list in Education Week's annual "Quality Counts" tally, with the nation's only B+ average. The new report found that no other state has a more consistent record of excellence than Maryland. Results for the State were above average in all six broad grade categories and ranked in the top seven in five of the six categories. According to Newsweek magazine, Maryland public schools rank first in the nation in the percentage of high schools offering—and students taking—college-level courses. College Board ranked Maryland's public school system first in the nation amongst students earning a score of three or higher on national AP exams.

The state budget for education was $5.5 billion in 2009.

== School assessment ==
The Maryland School Assessment (MSA) is a test of reading and math meeting NCLB requirements. Grades 3-8 are tested in math and reading, and grades 5 and 8 are tested in science. However, Maryland is field testing the Partnership for Assessment of Readiness for College and Careers this spring that is made specifically for the Common Core State Standards Initiative. Maryland plans to end the usage of MSA and expand the PARCC Assessment the following year. Maryland substituted PARCC for the MCAP during SY 2018–2019.

== Former superintendents ==
- Nancy Grasmick served as state superintendent of schools from 1991 to 2011.
- Lillian M. Lowery served as superintendent of the department from 2012 to 2015.
- Jack R. Smith served as interim superintendent of the department from 2015 to June 2016.
- Karen Salmon served as superintendent of the department from May 2016 to June 2021.
- Mohammed Choudhury served as superintendent of the department from July 2021 to October 2023.
